= Flacourtiaceae =

Family of flowering plants

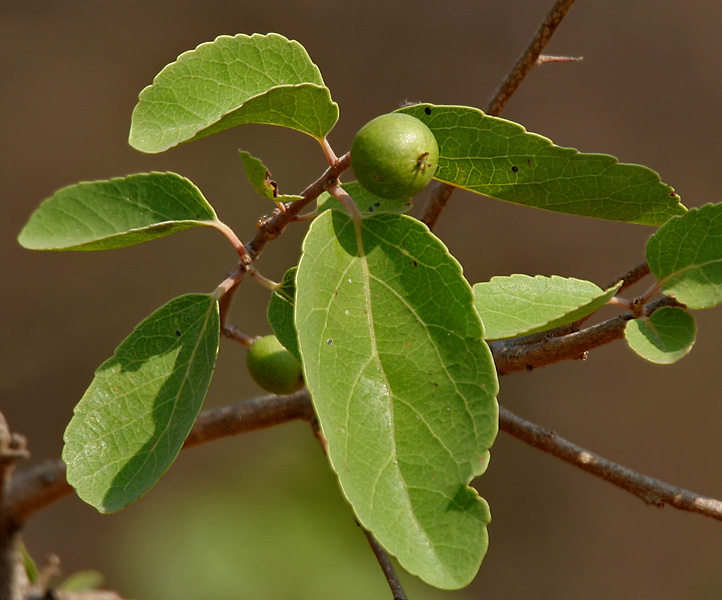
Flacourtia indica

The Flacourtiaceae is a defunct family of flowering plants whose former members have been scattered to various families, mostly to the Achariaceae and Salicaceae. It was so vaguely defined that hardly anything seemed out of place there and it became a dumping ground for odd and anomalous genera, gradually making the family even more heterogeneous. In 1975, Hermann Sleumer noted that "Flacourtiaceae as a family is a fiction; only the tribes are homogeneous."

In Cronquist's classification, the Flacourtiaceae included 79–89 genera and 800–1000 species. Of these, many, including the type genus Flacourtia, have now been transferred to the Salicaceae in the molecular phylogeny-based classification, known as the APG IV system, established by the Angiosperm Phylogeny Group. In the list below, the Salicaceae are circumscribed broadly. Some taxonomists further divide the Salicaceae sensu lato into three families: Salicaceae sensu stricto, Scyphostegiaceae, and Samydaceae, or into three subfamilies.

Genera formerly included in the Flacourtiaceae (current family, and subfamily for Salicaceae, in brackets)

- Abatia – (Salicaceae: Salicoideae)
- Aberia – (Salicaceae: Salicoideae)
- Ahernia – (Salicaceae: Salicoideae)
- Alzatea – (Alzateaceae)
- Aphaerema – (Salicaceae: Salicoideae)
- Aphloia – (Aphloiaceae)
- Asteropeia – (Asteropeiaceae)
- Azara – (Salicaceae: Salicoideae)
- Baileyoxylon – (Achariaceae)
- Banara – (Salicaceae: Salicoideae)
- Barteria – (Passifloraceae)
- Bartholomaea – (Salicaceae: Salicoideae)
- Bembicia – (Salicaceae: Salicoideae)
- Bembiciopsis – (Theaceae)
- Bennettiodendron – (Salicaceae: Salicoideae)
- Berberidopsis – (Berberidopsidaceae)
- Bivinia – (Salicaceae: Salicoideae)
- Buchnerodendron – (Achariaceae)
- Byrsanthus – (Salicaceae: Salicoideae)
- Calantica – (Salicaceae: Salicoideae)
- Caloncoba – (Achariaceae)
- Camptostylus – (Achariaceae)
- Carpotroche – (Achariaceae)
- Carrierea – (Salicaceae: Salicoideae)
- Casearia – (Salicaceae: Samydoideae)
- Chiangiodendron – (Achariaceae)
- Chlorocarpa – (Achariaceae)
- Claoxylon formerly Quadrasia – (Euphorbiaceae)
- Dasylepis – (Achariaceae)
- Dioncophyllum – (Dioncophyllaceae)
- Dissomera – (Salicaceae: Salicoideae)
- Dovyalis – (Salicaceae: Salicoideae)
- Eleutherandra – (Achariaceae)
- Erythrospermum – (Achariaceae)
- Euceraea – (Salicaceae: Samydoideae)
- Flacourtia – (Salicaceae: Salicoideae)
- Gerrardina – (Gerrardinaceae)
- Goethalsia – (Malvaceae)
- Grandidiera – (Achariaceae)
- Guya – (Euphorbiaceae)
- Gynocardia – (Achariaceae)
- Haptanthus – (Buxaceae)
- Hasseltia – (Salicaceae: Salicoideae)
- Hasseltiopsis – (Salicaceae: Salicoideae)
- Hecatostemon – (Salicaceae: Samydoideae)
- Hemiscolopia – (Salicaceae: Salicoideae)
- Homaliopsis – (Myrtaceae)
- Homalium – (Salicaceae: Salicoideae)
- Hydnocarpus – (Achariaceae)
- Idesia – (Salicaceae: Salicoideae)
- Irenodendron – (Salicaceae: Samydoideae)
- Itoa – (Salicaceae: Salicoideae)
- Kiggelaria – (Achariaceae)
- Kuhlmanniodendron – (Achariaceae)
- Lacistema – (Lacistemataceae)
- Laetia – (Salicaceae: Samydoideae)
- Lasiochlamys – (Salicaceae: Salicoideae)
- Lethodon – (Thymelaeaceae)
- Lindackeria – (Achariaceae)
- Lozania – (Lacistemataceae)
- Ludia – (Salicaceae: Salicoideae)
- Lunania – (Salicaceae: Samydoideae)
- Macrohasseltia – (Salicaceae: Salicoideae)
- Macrothumia – (Salicaceae: Salicoideae)
- Mayna – (Achariaceae)
- Mocquerysia – (Achariaceae)
- Muntingia – (Muntingiaceae)
- Neopringlea – (Salicaceae: Salicoideae)
- Neoptychocarpus – (Salicaceae: Samydoideae)
- Neosprucea – (Salicaceae: Salicoideae)
- Olmediella – (Salicaceae: Salicoideae)
- Oncoba sensu stricto – (Salicaceae: Salicoideae)
- Ophiobotrys – (Salicaceae: Samydoideae)
- Osmelia – (Salicaceae: Samydoideae)
- Pangium – (Achariaceae)
- Paropsia – (Passifloraceae)
- Peterodendron – (Achariaceae)
- Phyllobotryon – (Achariaceae)
- Phylloclinium – (Achariaceae)
- Pineda – (Salicaceae: Salicoideae)
- Plagiopteron – (Celastraceae)
- Pleuranthodendron – (Salicaceae: Salicoideae)
- Poggea – (Achariaceae)
- Poliothyrsis – (Salicaceae: Salicoideae)
- Priamosia – (Salicaceae: Salicoideae)
- Prockia – (Salicaceae: Salicoideae)
- Prockiopsis – (Achariaceae)
- Pseudoscolopia – (Salicaceae: Salicoideae)
- Pseudosmelia – (Salicaceae: Samydoideae)
- Rawsonia – (Achariaceae)
- Ryania – (Salicaceae: Samydoideae)
- Ryparosa – (Achariaceae)
- Sabouraea (=Talinella) – (Talinaceae)
- Samyda – (Salicaceae: Samydoideae)
- Scaphocalyx – (Achariaceae)
- Scolopia – (Salicaceae: Salicoideae)
- Scottellia – (Achariaceae)
- Stapfiella – (Passifloraceae)
- Streptothamnus – (Berberidopsidaceae)
- Tetrathylacium – (Salicaceae: Samydoideae)
- Tisonia – (Salicaceae: Salicoideae)
- Trichadenia – (Achariaceae)
- Trichostephanus – (Salicaceae: Samydoideae)
- Trimeria – (Salicaceae: Salicoideae)
- Xylosma – (Salicaceae: Salicoideae)
- Xylotheca – (Achariaceae)
- Zuelania – (Salicaceae: Samydoideae)
