= Irenodendron =

Scientific classification
- Kingdom: Plantae
- Clade: Embryophytes
- Clade: Tracheophytes
- Clade: Spermatophytes
- Clade: Angiosperms
- Clade: Eudicots
- Clade: Rosids
- Order: Malpighiales
- Family: Salicaceae
- Subfamily: Samydoideae
- Genus: Irenodendron; M.H.Alford & Dement

Type species
- Irenodendron cupulatum (Spruce ex Benth.) M.H.Alford & Dement

Species
- 3; see text

Genus of flowering plants in the family Salicaceae

Irenodendron is a genus of flowering plants in the family Salicaceae native to northern South America.

These species were previously treated as a section of the genus Laetia in the family Flacourtiaceae, but the genus Laetia and its relatives were moved to the Salicaceae based on analyses of DNA data. Irenodendron was later hypothesized to be more closely related to the genera Ryania, Trichostephanus, and Piparea due to the presence of an apically divided style, and wood with dark heartwood and large rays; it differs from those genera in having cup-shaped bracts under the flowers and in lacking staminodes.

== Known species ==
The following species are accepted by Plants of the World Online:

- Irenodendron coriaceum (Spruce ex Benth.) M.H.Alford & Dement
- Irenodendron cupulatum (Spruce ex Benth.) M.H.Alford & Dement
- Irenodendron ovalifolium (J.F.Macbr.) M.H.Alford & Dement
