= Hasseltiopsis =

Scientific classification
- Kingdom: Plantae
- Clade: Tracheophytes
- Clade: Angiosperms
- Clade: Eudicots
- Clade: Rosids
- Order: Malpighiales
- Family: Salicaceae
- Subfamily: Salicoideae
- Tribe: Prockieae
- Genus: Hasseltiopsis; Sleumer
- Species: H. dioica

Binomial name
- Hasseltiopsis dioica (Benth.) Sleumer

Synonyms
- Banara costaricensis (Standl.) Sleumer; Banara dioica Benth.; Hasseltia costaricensis Standl.; Hasseltia dioica (Benth.) Sleumer

Genus of flowering plants

Hasseltiopsis is a monotypic genus of flowering plants in the family Salicaceae. It includes a single species, Hasseltiopsis dioica, a tree native to southern Mexico and Costa Rica. Formerly placed in the heterogeneous family Flacourtiaceae, Hasseltiopsis is now classified in Salicaceae, along with close relatives Prockia, Pineda, Neosprucea, and Banara.
