= Ryania speciosa var. mutisii =

Conservation status
- Extinct (IUCN 2.3)

Scientific classification
- Kingdom: Plantae
- Clade: Tracheophytes
- Clade: Angiosperms
- Clade: Eudicots
- Clade: Rosids
- Order: Malpighiales
- Family: Salicaceae
- Genus: Ryania
- Species: R. speciosa
- Variety: †R. s. var. mutisii

Trinomial name
- †Ryania speciosa var. mutisii Monach.

Extinct variety of plant

Ryania speciosa var. mutisii is an extinct plant of Colombia, a variety of Ryania speciosa.
