= Aphaerema =

Genus of flowering plants

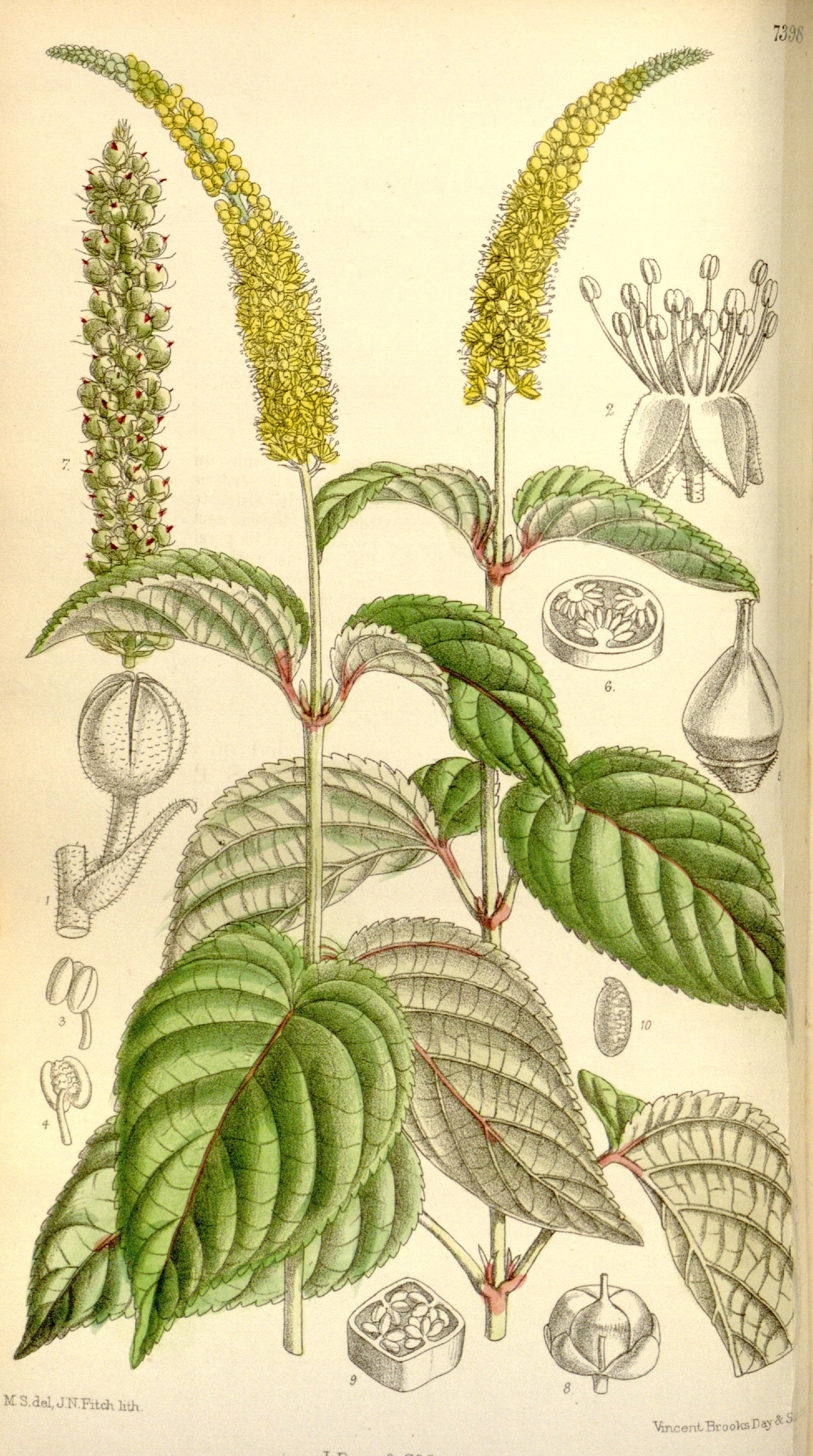
Abatia angeliana, formerly Aphaerema spicata

Aphaerema was formerly a genus of flowering plants in the Flacourtiaceae, consisting of one species of small shrubs, Aphaerema spicata, which is native to Brazil and Argentina. Later studies indicated that Aphaerema should be classified in the willow family, Salicaceae, and combined with the genus Abatia. Because the name Abatia spicata was already used, the species was given the new name Abatia angeliana, in honor of Brazilian botanist João Angely. Aphaerema (or Abatia including Aphaerema) is one of the few groups of Salicaceae with opposite leaves.
