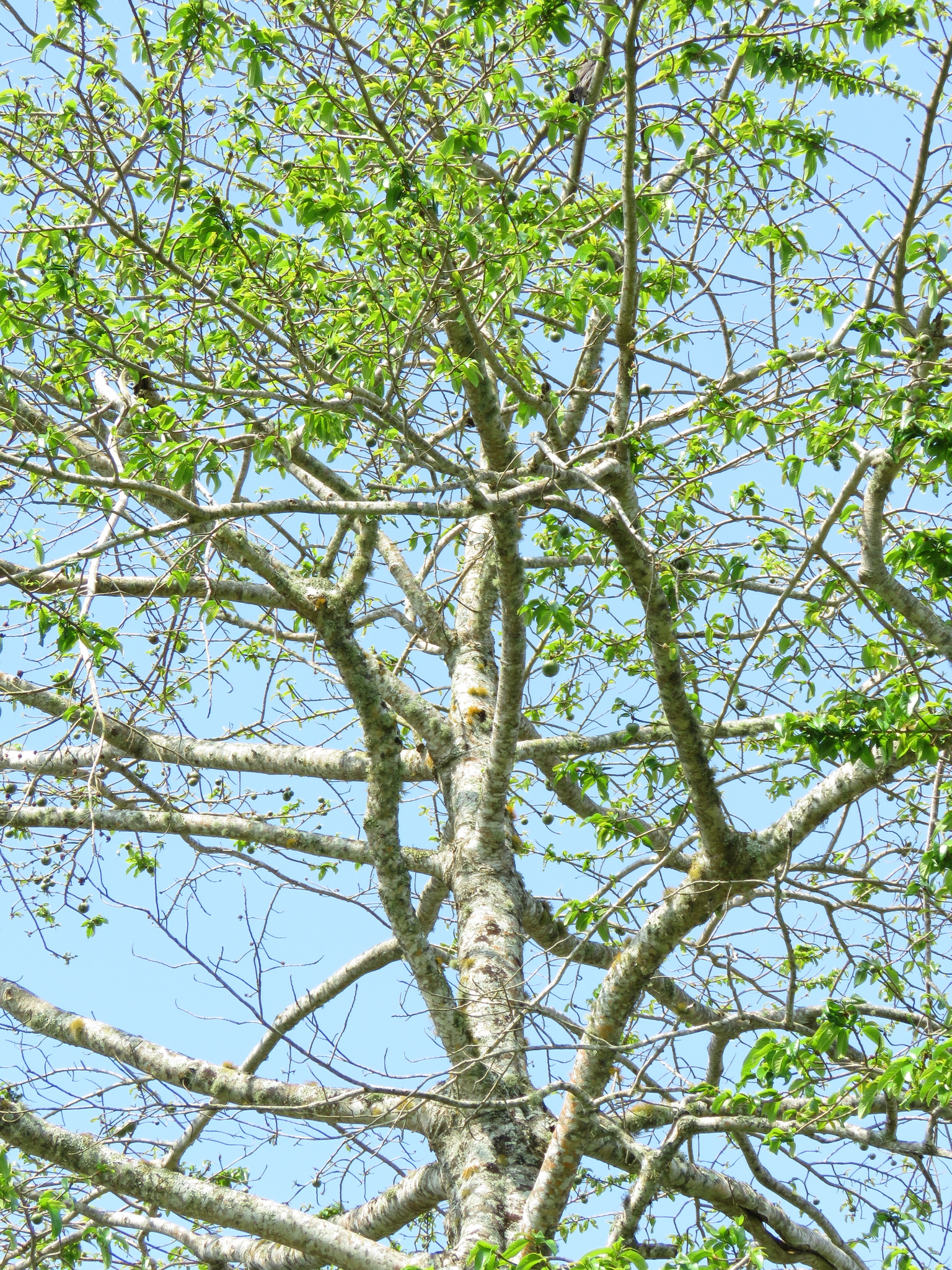
- Zuelania guidonia in Catemaco, Mexico

Scientific classification
- Kingdom: Plantae
- Clade: Tracheophytes
- Clade: Angiosperms
- Clade: Eudicots
- Clade: Rosids
- Order: Malpighiales
- Family: Salicaceae
- Subfamily: Samydoideae
- Genus: Zuelania; A.Richard in Sagra
- Species: Z. guidonia

Binomial name
- Zuelania guidonia (Swartz) Britton & Millspaugh

= Zuelania =

Genus of shrubs

Zuelania guidonia is a species of shrub or tree native to the West Indies, Central America, and northern South America and is the only member of the genus Zuelania. Formerly classified in the Flacourtiaceae, phylogenetic analyses based on DNA data indicate that this species, along with its close relatives in Casearia, Samyda, Hecatostemon, and Laetia, are better placed in a broadly circumscribed Salicaceae. Zuelania differs from its close relatives in having a large, subsessile stigma.
