= Hecatostemon =

Scientific classification
- Kingdom: Plantae
- Clade: Tracheophytes
- Clade: Angiosperms
- Clade: Eudicots
- Clade: Rosids
- Order: Malpighiales
- Family: Salicaceae
- Subfamily: Samydoideae
- Genus: Hecatostemon; S.F.Blake
- Species: H. completus

Binomial name
- Hecatostemon completus (Jacq.) Sleumer

Genus of flowering plants

Hecatostemon completus is a species of shrub or tree native to northeastern South America and is the only member of the genus Hecatostemon.

== Taxonomy ==
Formerly classified in the Flacourtiaceae, phylogenetic analyses based on DNA data indicate that this species, along with its close relatives in Casearia, Samyda, Laetia, and Zuelania, are better placed in a broadly circumscribed Salicaceae.

== Description ==
Hecatostemon differs from its close relatives in having numerous stamens in three series and one ring of staminodes, or "disk," inside the stamens.

== Distribution and habitat ==
The species is found in tropical deciduous forests, matorrales, savannahs, and even saline flats in northern Brazil, Colombia, Guyana, Peru, and Venezuela.
