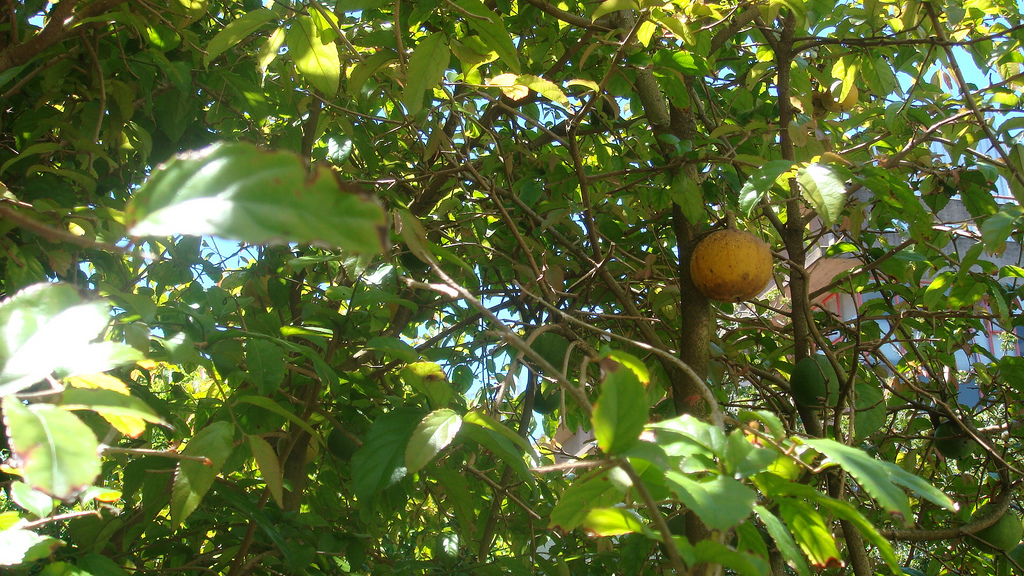
- Oncoba spinosa showing fruit and foliage

Scientific classification
- Kingdom: Plantae
- Clade: Tracheophytes
- Clade: Angiosperms
- Clade: Eudicots
- Clade: Rosids
- Order: Malpighiales
- Family: Salicaceae
- Genus: Oncoba
- Species: O. spinosa

Binomial name
- Oncoba spinosa Forssk.

= Oncoba spinosa =

Species of tree

Oncoba spinosa, the snuff-box tree, fried egg tree or fried-egg flower, is a plant species in the genus Oncoba traditionally placed in the family Flacourtiaceae, but now placed in the willow family, Salicaceae.

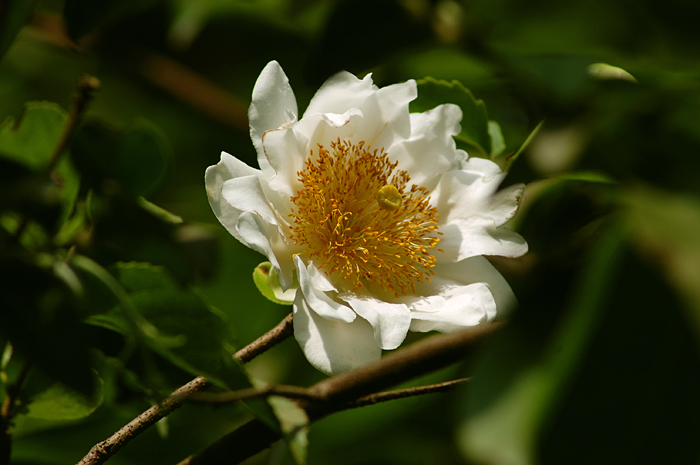
Oncoba spinosa flower

It is a small deciduous tree (usually no more than 5 m in height, but occasionally to 12 m (39 ft), that has simple leaves. The 9 cm (3.5 in) wide flowers have up to seventeen white petals and attractive with a yellow centre due to the stamens, resembling a fried egg. They appear on the tree from just before or around the time the new leaves are produced and the tree is in bloom for up to three months. The fruit is hard-shelled, globose and has a pointed tip. It measures up to 80 mm in diameter and is yellow to reddish-brown in colour. In southern Africa, it blooms from September to December. The tree is widely distributed along the eastern side of Africa as far as South Africa, mainly in dry woodland or open savanna in a wide range of sites from river valleys to rocky hills. Its northernmost limit is reached on the eastern side of the Red Sea in Arabia.

== See also ==
- List of Southern African indigenous trees and woody lianes
