= Ludia mauritiana =

Scientific classification
- Kingdom: Plantae
- Clade: Tracheophytes
- Clade: Angiosperms
- Clade: Eudicots
- Clade: Rosids
- Order: Malpighiales
- Family: Salicaceae
- Genus: Ludia
- Species: L. mauritiana

Binomial name
- Ludia mauritiana J.F.Gmel.

Species of tree

Ludia mauritiana is a species of evergreen tree in the family Salicaceae. It is native to southeastern Africa and Madagascar. It was first described by the German botanist Johann Friedrich Gmelin, the type locality being Mauritius.

== Description ==
Ludia mauritiana is a small evergreen tree or large shrub growing to a height of 10 m (33 ft) or more. The bark is grey and the twigs have numerous lenticels. The leaves are alternate with short stalks and oblong to obovate blades about 3 to 9 cm (1.2 to 3.5 in) by 2 to 4 cm (0.8 to 1.6 in). The leaves are leathery and glossy, with entire margins, wedge-shaped bases and obtuse apexes. The flowers appear singly in the axils of the leaves. They are bisexual, small and yellowish-white. They are followed by globular, berry-like capsules that turn reddish as they dry.

== Distribution ==
Ludia mauritiana is native to southeastern Africa and is found in Kenya, Tanzania, Mozambique, Madagascar, Mayotte, Mauritius and the Seychelles. It grows in dry, evergreen forests and woodland at elevations of up to 1,750 m (5,700 ft) on the African mainland, and in dry or semi-moist forests on Madagascar at up to 1,300 m (4,300 ft). It grows in varying types of soil including laterite, sandy soils and limestone soils.

== Uses ==
The wood of this tree is hard and dense. It is used as poles for construction work, railway sleepers and mine props, and to make furniture, implements and tool handles, but the small size of the tree limits the utility of its timber and it is only used locally. It is also made into charcoal and used for firewood.
