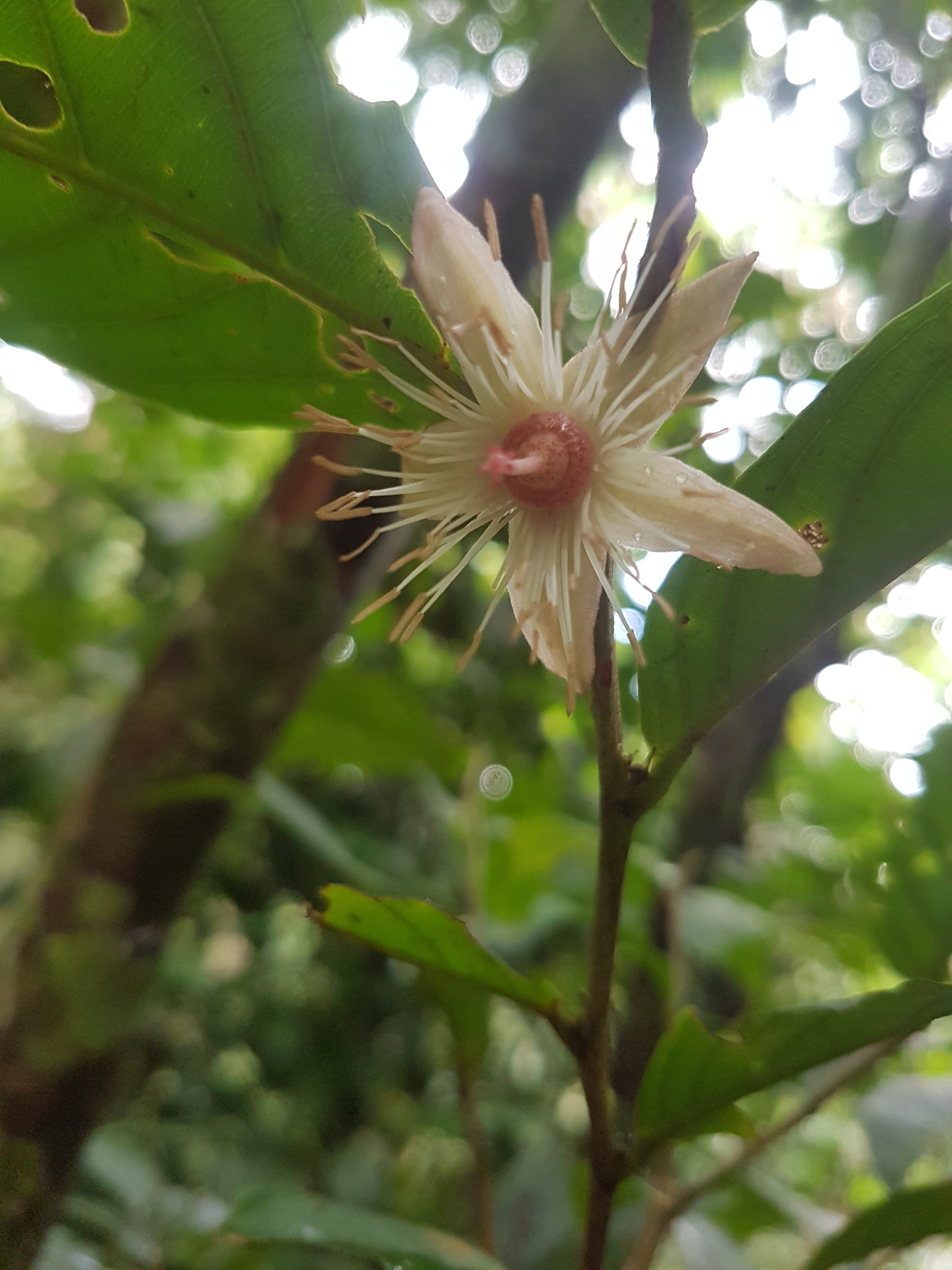
- In Peru

Conservation status
- Least Concern (IUCN 3.1)

Scientific classification
- Kingdom: Plantae
- Clade: Embryophytes
- Clade: Tracheophytes
- Clade: Angiosperms
- Clade: Eudicots
- Clade: Rosids
- Order: Malpighiales
- Family: Salicaceae
- Genus: Ryania
- Species: R. speciosa

Binomial name
- Ryania speciosa Vahl

= Ryania speciosa =

Species of flowering plant

Ryania speciosa is a species of flowering plant in the family Salicaceae.

The species is significant partly because the alkaloid ryanodine was originally isolated from this South American tree.

The tree was used by indigenous people to kill fish and other animals. The insecticidal activity of the plant was discovered in the early 1940s by a collaborative search by scientists from Merck and Rutgers university. The tree and its partially purified extracts were used as an insecticide in organic farming since the 1940s, but was removed from the market in 1997. A major active ingredient is ryanodine, but other compounds also contribute to the insecticidal activity of the plant.

== Varieties ==
The Catalogue of Life lists these varieties:

- R. s. var. bicolor
- R. s. var. chocoensis
- R. s. var. minor
- R. s. var. mutisii (extinct)
- R. s. var. panamensis
- R. s. var. stipularis
- R. s. var. subuliflora
- R. s. var. tomentella
- R. s. var. tomentosa
