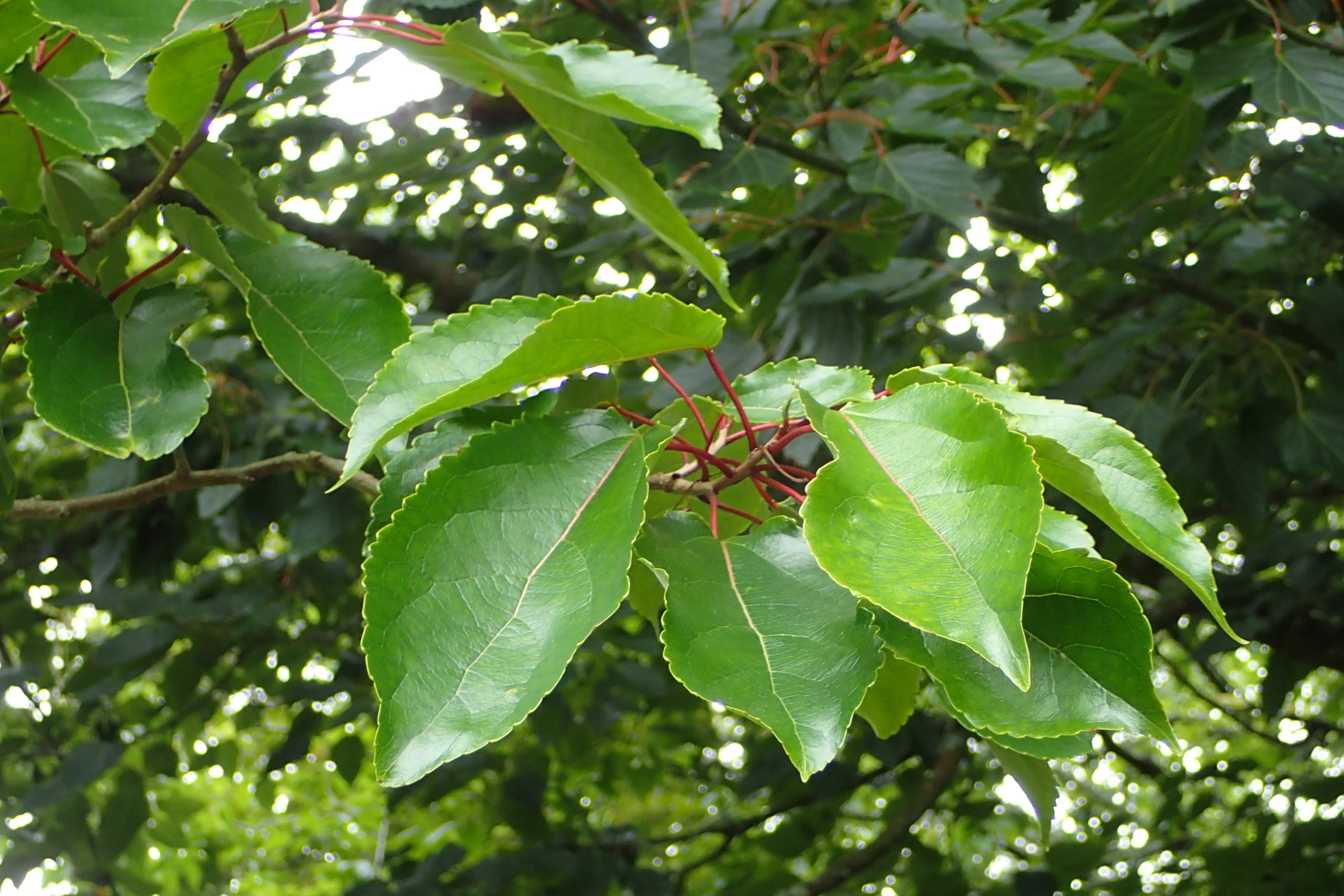
- At Hackfalls Arboretum, New Zealand

Conservation status
- Least Concern (IUCN 3.1)

Scientific classification
- Kingdom: Plantae
- Clade: Tracheophytes
- Clade: Angiosperms
- Clade: Eudicots
- Clade: Rosids
- Order: Malpighiales
- Family: Salicaceae
- Genus: Carrierea
- Species: C. calycina

Binomial name
- Carrierea calycina Franch.

Synonyms
- Carrierea rehderiana Sleumer

= Carrierea calycina =

Species of tree

Carrierea calycina is a species of tree in the willow family. It is native to China. Its common names include goat horn tree in English and yang jiao shu in Mandarin.
