= Banara wilsonii =

Conservation status
- Extinct (1938) (IUCN 3.1)

Scientific classification
- Kingdom: Plantae
- Clade: Tracheophytes
- Clade: Angiosperms
- Clade: Eudicots
- Clade: Rosids
- Order: Malpighiales
- Family: Salicaceae
- Genus: Banara
- Species: †B. wilsonii

Binomial name
- †Banara wilsonii Alain

Extinct species of flowering plant

Banara wilsonii is an extinct species of tree in the family Salicaceae. It was endemic to an area near Puerto Padre, Las Tunas Province, Cuba. It went extinct due to habitat loss.
