= Mocquerysia =

Mocquerysia may refer to:

- Mocquerysia (beetle), a genus of beetles in the family Elateridae
- Mocquerysia (plant), a genus of plants in the family Salicaceae
