= Neosprucea sararensis =

Conservation status
- Endangered (IUCN 3.1)

Scientific classification
- Kingdom: Plantae
- Clade: Tracheophytes
- Clade: Angiosperms
- Clade: Eudicots
- Clade: Rosids
- Order: Malpighiales
- Family: Salicaceae
- Genus: Neosprucea
- Species: N. sararensis

Binomial name
- Neosprucea sararensis Cuatrec.

Species of flowering plant

Neosprucea sararensis is a species of flowering plant in the family Salicaceae. It is found only in Colombia.
