= Carex toreadora =

Conservation status
- Endangered (IUCN 3.1)

Scientific classification
- Kingdom: Plantae
- Clade: Tracheophytes
- Clade: Angiosperms
- Clade: Monocots
- Clade: Commelinids
- Order: Poales
- Family: Cyperaceae
- Genus: Carex
- Subgenus: Carex subg. Vignea
- Section: Carex sect. Ovales
- Species: C. toreadora

Binomial name
- Carex toreadora Steyerm.

Species of grass-like plant

Carex toreadora is a little-known species of sedge from Ecuador. It was described in 1964 by the prolific plant collector Julian A. Steyermark, having been collected in 1943 at an altitude of 3,785–3,900 metres (12,418–12,795 ft) in Azuay Province. There it grew in "moist mossy boggy places bordering [an] alpine lake". No further collections have ever been made, and the species is listed as endangered on the IUCN Red List. It is classified in Carex sect. Ovales, and is thought to be closely related to species such as Carex mandoniana and Carex macloviana.
