= Ahernia =

Scientific classification
- Kingdom: Plantae
- Clade: Tracheophytes
- Clade: Angiosperms
- Clade: Eudicots
- Clade: Rosids
- Order: Malpighiales
- Family: Achariaceae
- Genus: Ahernia; Merr.
- Species: A. glandulosa

Binomial name
- Ahernia glandulosa Merr.

Genus of trees

Ahernia is a genus of a single species, Ahernia glandulosa, a tree in the family Achariaceae, native to Hainan and Luzon island of the Philippines. Previously it was treated in the family Flacourtiaceae before being placed in Achariaceae. Ahernia is closely related to the American genera Hasseltia, Macrothumia, and Pleuranthodendron, but differs in its axillary racemes and more numerous (10–15) petals. Ahernia glandulosa is found in low elevation primary forests and is known in the Tagalog language as butun or sanglai. It grows 8–15 m (26–49 ft) tall.
