= Banara ibaguensis =

Conservation status
- Least Concern (IUCN 3.1)

Scientific classification
- Kingdom: Plantae
- Clade: Tracheophytes
- Clade: Angiosperms
- Clade: Eudicots
- Clade: Rosids
- Order: Malpighiales
- Family: Salicaceae
- Genus: Banara
- Species: B. ibaguensis

Binomial name
- Banara ibaguensis Tulasne

Species of plant

Banara ibaguensis is a species of plant in the family Salicaceae. It is endemic to Colombia.
