= Laetia micrantha =

Conservation status
- Vulnerable (IUCN 2.3)

Scientific classification
- Kingdom: Plantae
- Clade: Tracheophytes
- Clade: Angiosperms
- Clade: Eudicots
- Clade: Rosids
- Order: Malpighiales
- Family: Salicaceae
- Genus: Laetia
- Species: L. micrantha

Binomial name
- Laetia micrantha A. Robyns

Species of flowering plant

Laetia micrantha is a species of plant in the Salicaceae family. It is endemic to Panama. It is threatened by habitat loss.
