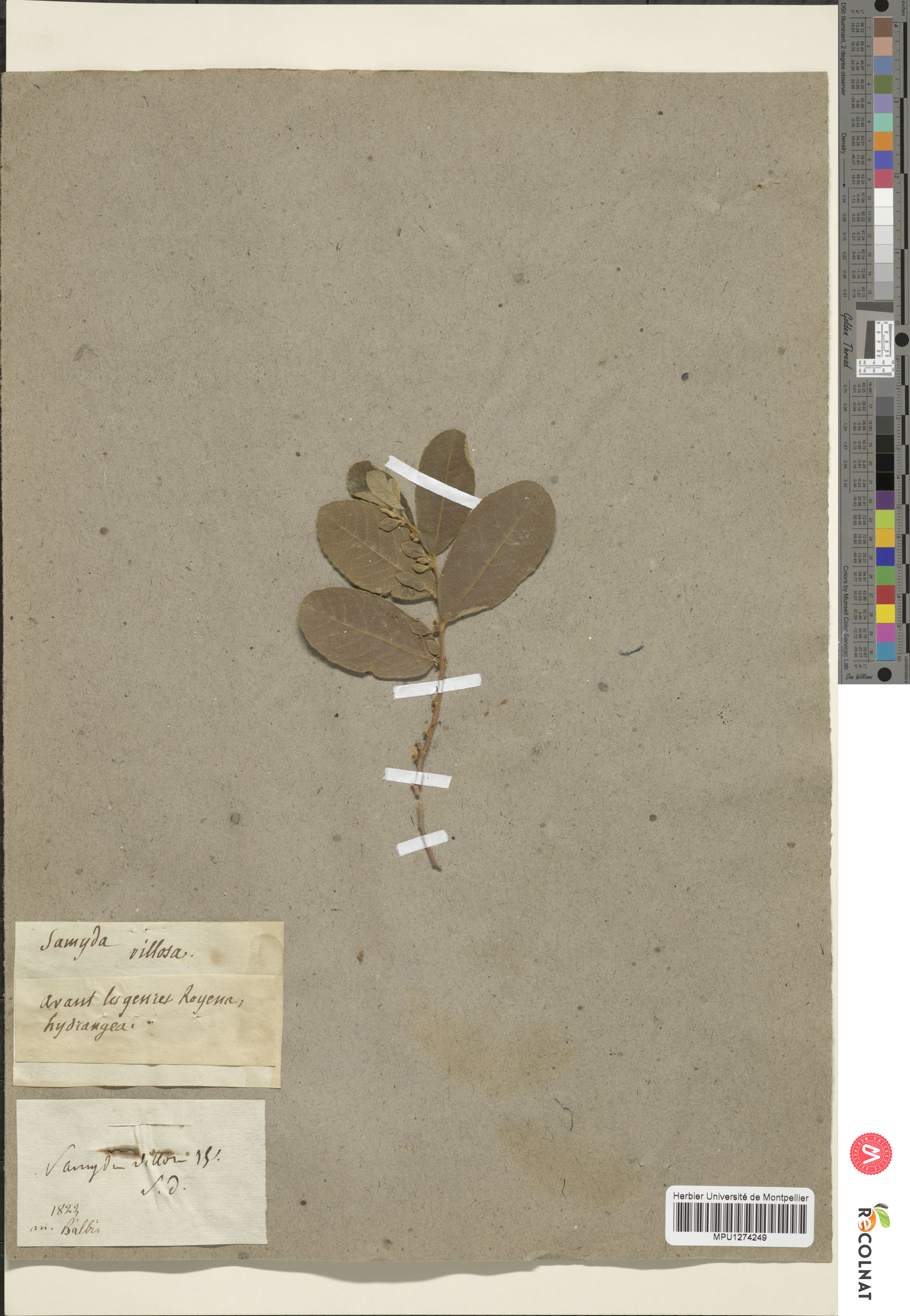

Conservation status
- Vulnerable (IUCN 2.3)

Scientific classification
- Kingdom: Plantae
- Clade: Tracheophytes
- Clade: Angiosperms
- Clade: Eudicots
- Clade: Rosids
- Order: Malpighiales
- Family: Salicaceae
- Genus: Samyda
- Species: S. villosa

Binomial name
- Samyda villosa Sw.

= Samyda villosa =

Species of flowering plant

Samyda villosa is a species of plant in the Salicaceae family. It is endemic to Jamaica.
