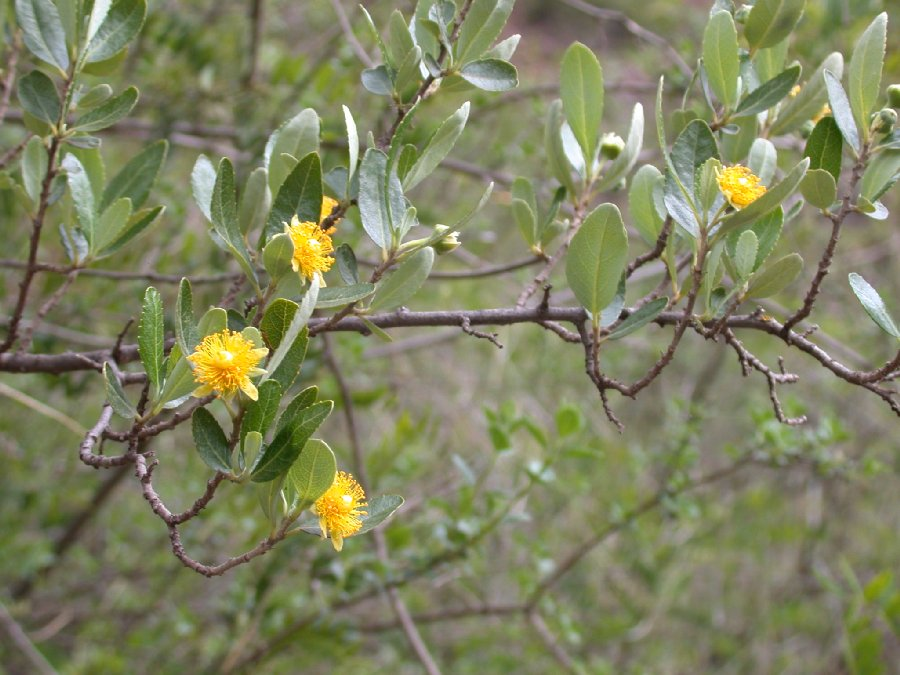
- Pineda incana

Scientific classification
- Kingdom: Plantae
- Clade: Tracheophytes
- Clade: Angiosperms
- Clade: Eudicots
- Clade: Rosids
- Order: Malpighiales
- Family: Salicaceae
- Subfamily: Salicoideae
- Tribe: Prockieae
- Genus: Pineda; Ruiz & Pav.

Type species
- Pineda incana Ruiz & Pav.

Species
- 2; see text

Synonyms
- Christannia C.Presl

= Pineda (plant) =

Genus of shrubs

Pineda is a genus of flowering plants in the family Salicaceae. It contains two species of shrubs: Pineda incana, which is native to the Andes of Ecuador and Peru, and Pineda ovata, which is native to the Andes of Bolivia.

Pineda is unique among Salicaceae in that the species have 4-5 sepals and petals, hermaphroditic flowers, receptacular disk glands (=nectaries), and outer filamentous staminodes. It is one of few genera of Salicaceae that occur at high elevations. Formerly placed in the heterogeneous family Flacourtiaceae, Pineda is now classified in tribe Prockieae of Salicaceae, along with close relatives Prockia, Banara, Hasseltiopsis, and Neosprucea.

Pineda was named in honor of Antonio Pineda, a Guatemalan botanist who was coordinator of the naturalists aboard the Pacific expedition of Alessandro Malaspina.

Pineda incana is known as "lloqui," "lloque," "lloquecillos," or "manzanitas cimarronas," and Pineda ovata is known as "duraznillo." Pineda ovata is commonly misidentified as Prockia crucis (Salicaceae).

== Known species ==
The following species are accepted by Plants of the World Online:

- Pineda incana Ruiz & Pav.
- Pineda ovata M.H.Alford & Zmarzty
