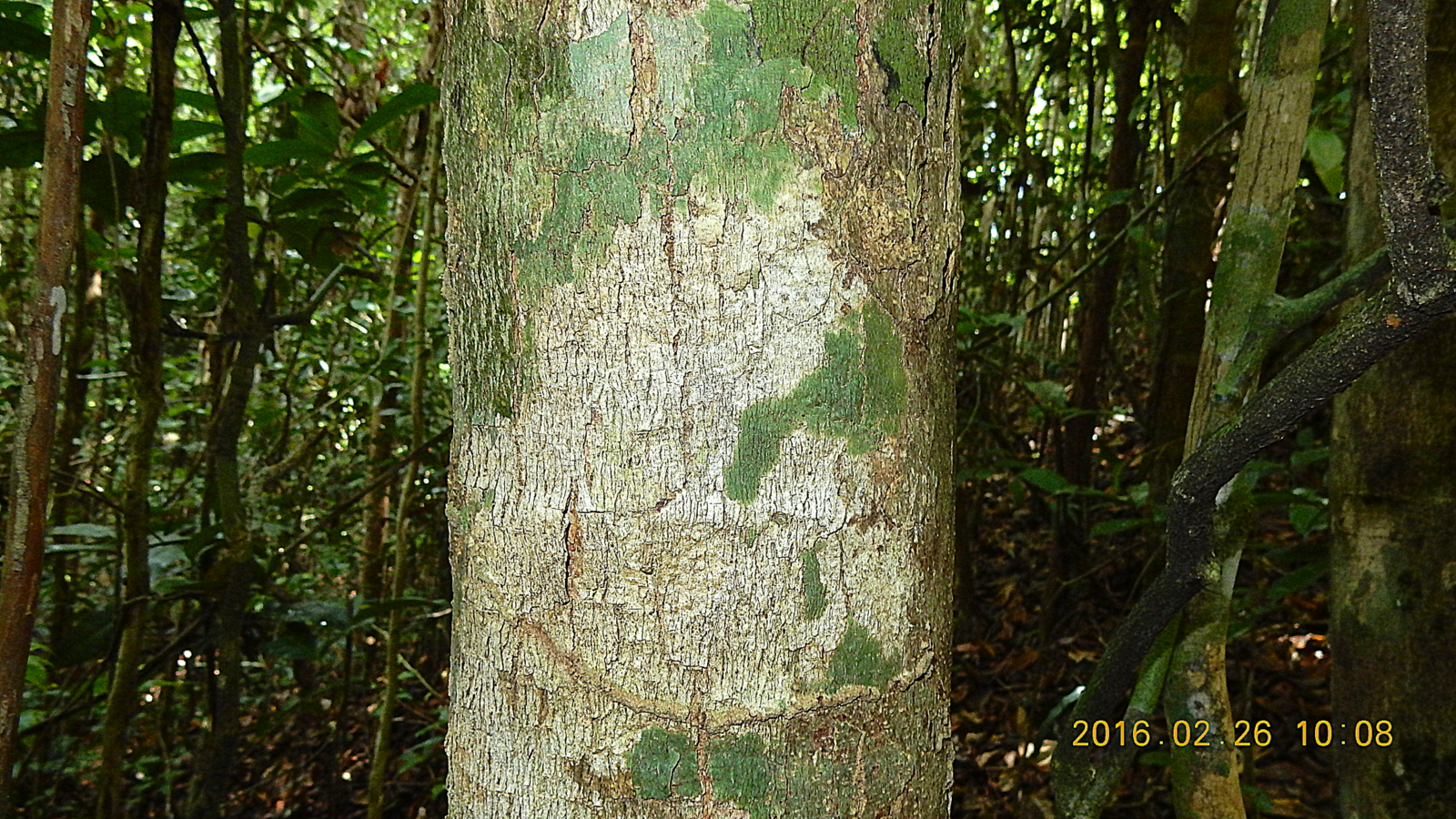

Scientific classification
- Kingdom: Plantae
- Clade: Tracheophytes
- Clade: Angiosperms
- Clade: Eudicots
- Clade: Rosids
- Order: Malpighiales
- Family: Salicaceae
- Genus: Macrothumia; M.H.Alford
- Species: M. kuhlmannii

Binomial name
- Macrothumia kuhlmannii (Sleumer) M.H.Alford

Synonyms
- Banara kuhlmannii (Sleumer) Sleumer; Neosprucea kuhlmannii Sleumer

= Macrothumia =

Genus of trees

Macrothumia is a genus in the willow family Salicaceae with a single species Macrothumia kuhlmannii. It is a tree native to the states of Bahia, Espírito Santo, and Minas Gerais in Brazil. Formerly classified in the genus Banara in the family Flacourtiaceae, phylogenetic analyses based on DNA data indicate that this species, along with its close relatives in Ahernia, Hasseltia, and Pleuranthodendron are better placed in a broadly circumscribed Salicaceae. Macrothumia differs from its close relatives in having a congested fascicle- or umbel-like inflorescence and a large (>3 cm diameter) fruit. The genus name is derived from the Greek word μακροθυμία, which means long-suffering and enduring patience.
