= Banara brasiliensis =

Conservation status
- Vulnerable (IUCN 2.3)

Scientific classification
- Kingdom: Plantae
- Clade: Tracheophytes
- Clade: Angiosperms
- Clade: Eudicots
- Clade: Rosids
- Order: Malpighiales
- Family: Salicaceae
- Genus: Banara
- Species: B. brasiliensis

Binomial name
- Banara brasiliensis (Schott) Bentham

Species of flowering plant

Banara brasiliensis is a species of plant in the Salicaceae family. It is endemic to Brazil.
