= Piparea dentata =

Conservation status
- Least Concern (IUCN 3.1)

Scientific classification
- Kingdom: Plantae
- Clade: Tracheophytes
- Clade: Angiosperms
- Clade: Eudicots
- Clade: Rosids
- Order: Malpighiales
- Family: Salicaceae
- Genus: Piparea
- Species: P. dentata

Binomial name
- Piparea dentata Aubl.

Synonyms
- List: Alsodeia piparea Spreng.; Casearia brighamii S.Watson; Casearia commersoniana Cambess.; Casearia congestiflora Turcz.; Casearia densiflora Benth.; Casearia densiflora var. parviflora Eichler; Casearia dentata (Aubl.) Eichler; Casearia javitensis var. myriantha (Turcz.) L.O.Williams; Casearia lasiosperma Triana & Planch.; Casearia laurifolia Benth.; Casearia maximiliani Eichler; Casearia miradorensis Eichler; Casearia myriantha Turcz.; Conohoria aubletii D.Dietr.

Species of flowering plant

Piparea dentata is a species of flowering plant in the family Salicaceae. It is the type species of its genus, Piparea.

The plant has a very wide distribution, spanning from Nayarit in Mexico to Minas Gerais in Brazil. It has a presence in most of Central America and South America, throughout many countries. The species occurs primarily in the wet tropical biome within subdeciduous dry forests, medium deciduous forests, medium sub-evergreen forests, and thorny forests along the coast at elevations of 0–800 m (0–2,625 ft).

Piparea dentata is used as a medicine.

== Description ==
Piparea dentata is a shrub or small tree, reaching heights of 3–8 m (9.8–26.2 ft). Its leaves are alternate and branched, with a pubescent texture. They are typically green and glabrous, but may appear red, hairy at the base, or emarginate. The leaves are ovate, serrate, and acuminate, ending in an obtuse apex. The plant produces fruits that can be foliaceous or axillary, displaying a variegated red and green coloration. and are typically borne by August.

== Taxonomy ==
Piparea dentata was first described by Jean Baptiste Christophore Fusée Aublet in 1775. Over time, the species gained a list of synonyms, many of which formerly recognized as members of Casearia.

== Conservation status ==
Piparea dentata is currently assessed as LC due to its stable and abundant population. The species has been recorded numerous times, with many fertile collections indicating healthy populations. It benefits from well-conserved habitats and is present in several protected areas, including Los Tuxtlas and La Sepultura in Mexico. Currently, there are no severe impacts or significant future threats identified for this taxon, although there is only one ex situ collection.
