= Trimeria =

Trimeria may refer to:

- Trimeria (wasp), a genus of wasps in the family Vespidae
- Trimeria (plant), a genus of plants in the family Salicaceae
