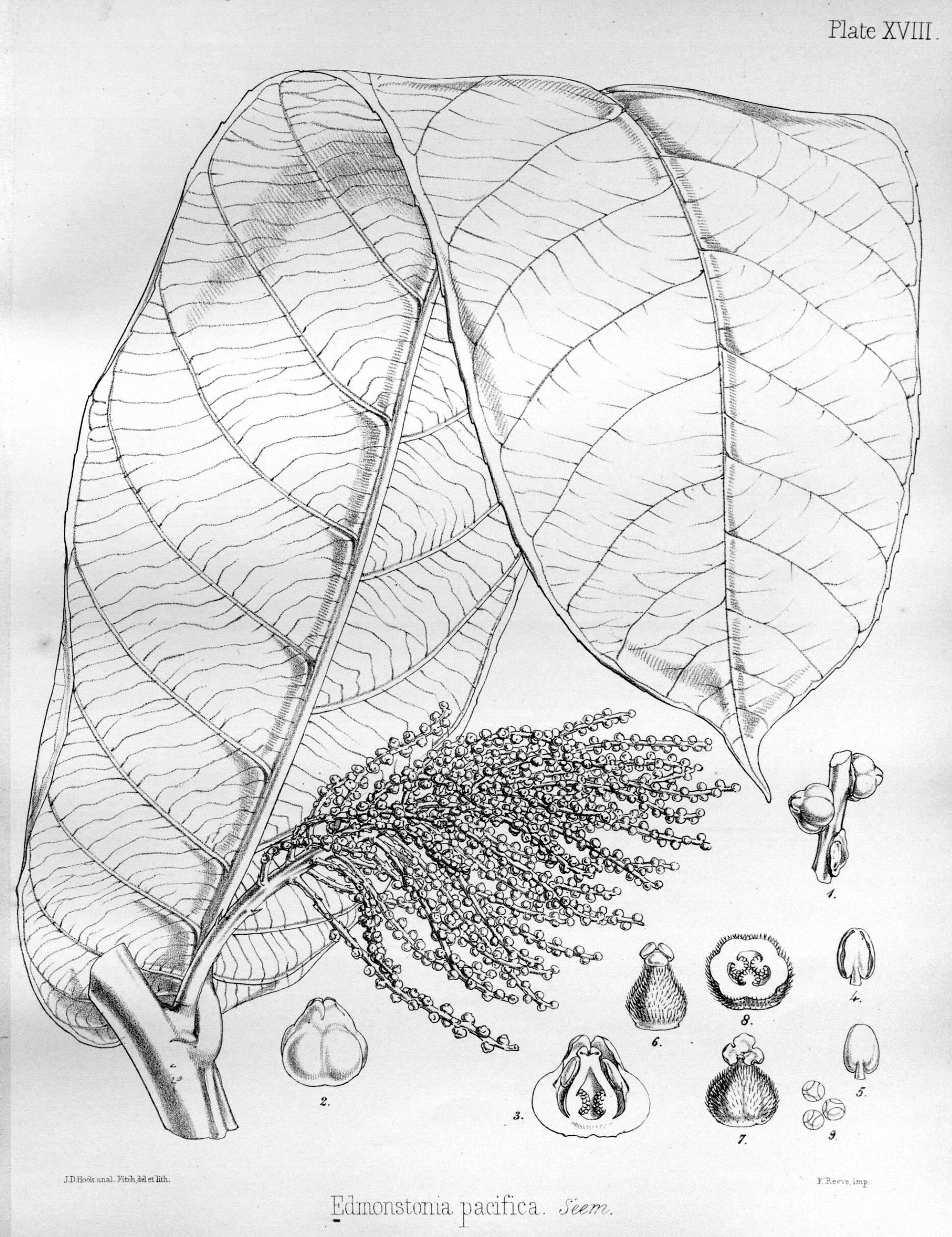
- Botanical drawing of Tetrathylacium macrophyllum from 1853

Scientific classification
- Kingdom: Plantae
- Clade: Tracheophytes
- Clade: Angiosperms
- Clade: Eudicots
- Clade: Rosids
- Order: Malpighiales
- Family: Salicaceae
- Subfamily: Samydoideae
- Genus: Tetrathylacium; Poepp.

Type species
- Tetrathylacium macrophyllum Poepp.

Species
- 5; see text

Synonyms
- Edmonstonia Seemann

= Tetrathylacium =

Genus of flowering plants in the family Salicaceae

Tetrathylacium is a genus of flowering plants in the family Salicaceae. The genus spans across South America and parts of Central America, as far north as Costa Rica, and as far south as Bolivia.

Previously it was treated in the family Flacourtiaceae but was moved along with its close relatives to the Salicaceae based on analyses of DNA data. Tetrathylacium is rather unique in the Samydaceae in having tightly arranged panicles of spikes, four sepals and stamens, and non-arillate seeds. The stems are often inhabited by ants, and T. macrophyllum is suspected to have locust pollination.

== Known species ==
The following species are accepted by Plants of the World Online:

- Tetrathylacium johansenii Standl.
- Tetrathylacium longirachis D.Santam. & Liesner
- Tetrathylacium macrophyllum Poepp.
- Tetrathylacium sarayakuorum D.Santam. & Liesner
- Tetrathylacium vraem Huamantupa
