= Carex mandoniana =

Scientific classification
- Kingdom: Plantae
- Clade: Tracheophytes
- Clade: Angiosperms
- Clade: Monocots
- Clade: Commelinids
- Order: Poales
- Family: Cyperaceae
- Genus: Carex
- Species: C. mandoniana

Binomial name
- Carex mandoniana Boeckeler

Species of plant

Carex mandoniana is a tussock-forming species of perennial sedge in the family Cyperaceae. It is native to western parts of South America.

The species was first formally described by the botanist Johann Otto Boeckeler in 1896 as a part of the work Allgemeine Botanische Zeitschrift für Systematik, Floristik, Pflanzengeographie. The type specimen was collected by Gilbert Mandon in 1859 in Bolivia.

== See also ==
- List of Carex species
