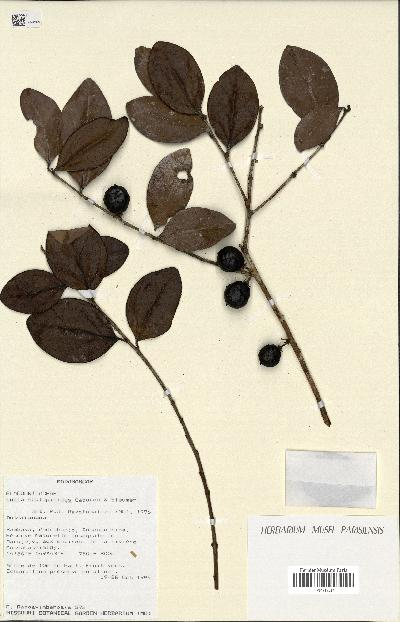
- Herbarium specimen of Ludia scolopioides at the National Museum of Natural History, France

Scientific classification
- Kingdom: Plantae
- Clade: Tracheophytes
- Clade: Angiosperms
- Clade: Eudicots
- Clade: Rosids
- Order: Malpighiales
- Family: Salicaceae
- Subfamily: Salicoideae
- Tribe: Saliceae
- Genus: Ludia; Comm. ex Juss.

Synonyms
- Mauneia Thouars

= Ludia (plant) =

Genus of flowering plants in the family Salicaceae

Ludia is a genus of flowering plants in the family Salicaceae.

The genus is native to the Zanzibar–Inhambane coastal forests of Kenya and Tanzania, as well as to Madagascar, the Comoros, the Seychelles, and Aldabra.

== Description ==
Ludia comprises trees and shrubs. Its leaves are alternate, evergreen and generally leathery (coriaceous), with entire or occasionally slightly toothed margins. They are petiolate and exstipulate (lack stipules). The leaf venation is pinnate, with lateral veins extending from a central midrib.

The flowers are hermaphrodite and generally occur singly in the leaf axils, although they may occasionally grow in groups of two or three. They are sessile or pedicellate and are accompanied by several small, overlapping bracts. The flowers typically have five to eight, occasionally up to ten, perianth segments arranged in a single series. Numerous stamens are attached to a flattened receptacle, which often bears a glandular disc. The ovary is unilocular, with two to four placentas, and the style is generally divided into two to four branches.

The fruit is berry-like, with a pericarp that is leathery and opens only slightly or irregularly when mature. Each fruit generally contains a small number of seeds, usually two to five, although the number may range from one to twelve. The seeds have a thick testa.

== Taxonomy ==
Ludia is classified in the family Salicaceae. Its taxonomic placement has changed historically, as it was previously treated among the Flacourtiaceae. Distinguishing characteristics used to separate Ludia from the related genus Scolopia include its apetalous flowers and generally pinnate leaves.

== Species ==
Species accepted by Plants of the World Online:

- Ludia ankaranensis Capuron & Sleumer – Madagascar
- Ludia antanosarum Capuron & Sleumer – Madagascar
- Ludia arborea H.Perrier – Madagascar
- Ludia boinensis H.Perrier – Madagascar
- Ludia brevipes Sleumer – Madagascar
- Ludia chapelieri Sleumer – Madagascar
- Ludia comorensis H.Perrier – Comoros
- Ludia craggiana Z.S.Rogers, Randrian. & J.S.Mill. – Madagascar
- Ludia dracaenoides H.Perrier – Madagascar
- Ludia erosifolia Sleumer – Madagascar
- Ludia faradifani Capuron & Sleumer – Madagascar
- Ludia glaucocarpa Capuron & Sleumer – Madagascar
- Ludia ikongoensis Capuron & Sleumer – Madagascar
- Ludia imontiensis Capuron & Sleumer – Madagascar
- Ludia leandriana Sleumer – Madagascar
- Ludia ludiifolia (H.Perrier) Capuron & Sleumer – Madagascar
- Ludia madagascariensis Clos – Madagascar
- Ludia mauritiana J.F.Gmel. – Aldabra, Comoros, Kenya, Madagascar, Mauritius, Seychelles, Tanzania
- Ludia myrtoides Capuron & Sleumer – Madagascar
- Ludia pachyadenia Sleumer – Madagascar
- Ludia pinnatinervia (H.Perrier) Capuron & Sleumer – Madagascar
- Ludia scolopioides Capuron & Sleumer – Madagascar
- Ludia sessilis Sleumer – Madagascar
- Ludia suarezensis Capuron & Sleumer – Madagascar
- Ludia wikstroemiifolia Sleumer – Madagascar
