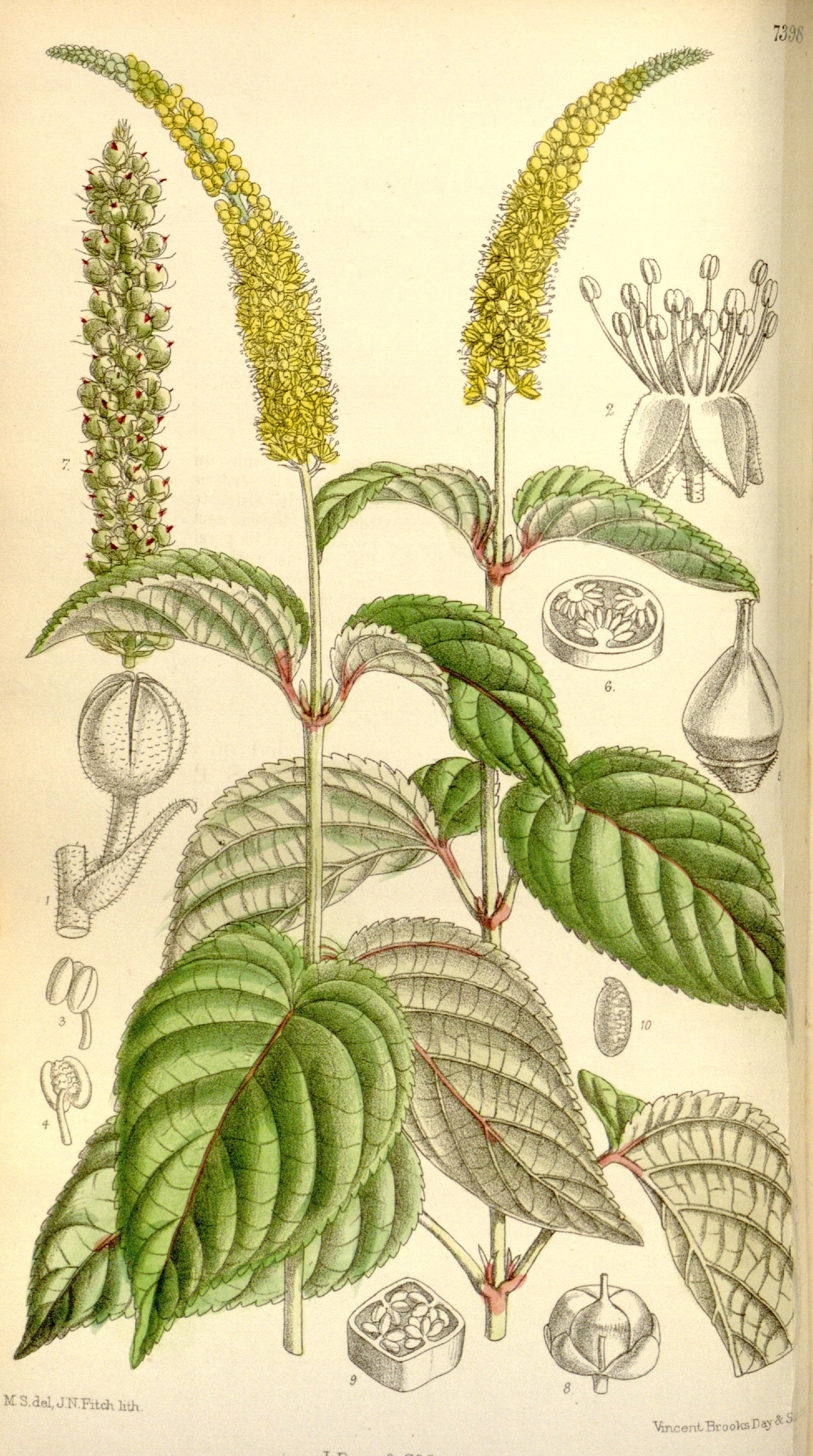
- illustration of Abatia angeliana

Scientific classification
- Kingdom: Plantae
- Clade: Tracheophytes
- Clade: Angiosperms
- Clade: Eudicots
- Clade: Rosids
- Order: Malpighiales
- Family: Salicaceae
- Subfamily: Salicoideae
- Tribe: Abatieae
- Genus: Abatia; Ruiz & Pav.

Species
- 10; see text

Synonyms
- Aphaerema Miers; Raleighia Gardner; Graniera Mandon & Wedd. ex Benth. & Hook.f.; Myriotriche Turcz.

= Abatia =

Tree genus

Abatia (syn. Raleighia Gardner) is a genus of about ten species of Central and South American trees in the family Salicaceae (following the Angiosperm Phylogeny Group classification). Previously, it was treated in the family Flacourtiaceae, or tribe Abatieae of the family Passifloraceae (Lemke 1988) or Samydaceae by G. Bentham & J.D. Hooker and Hutchinson.

Its native range stretches from Mexico to northern Argentina. It is also found in Bolivia, Brazil, Colombia, Costa Rica, Ecuador, and Peru.

Abatia has opposite leaves with very small stipules and marginal glands at the base of the blade of the leaf. The valvate (meeting at the edges without overlapping) perianth (sepal and petal together) members are closely joined at the base. They bear many filamentous processes.

The leaves of A. rugosa and A. parviflora are source of black dye in Peru.

The genus name of Abatia is in honour of Pedro Abad y Mestre (1747–1800), a Spanish apothecary and professor of botany in Seville, Spain. It was first described and published in Fl. Peruv. Prodr. Vol.78 on table 14 in 1794.

== Known species ==
The following species are accepted by Plants of the World Online:

- Abatia americana (Gardner) Eichler
- Abatia angeliana M.H.Alford
- Abatia canescens Sleumer
- Abatia glabra Sleumer
- Abatia mexicana Standl.
- Abatia microphylla Taub.
- Abatia parviflora Ruiz & Pav.
- Abatia rugosa Ruiz & Pav.
- Abatia spicata (Turcz.) Sleumer
- Abatia stellata Lillo

== Other sources ==
- Bernhard, A. 1999. Flower structure, development, and systematics in Passifloraceae and in Abatia (Flacourtiaceae). Int. J. Plant Sci. 160: 135–150, illus.
- Sleumer, H.O.(1980). Flacourtiaceae.Flora Neotropica 22:55–57. [monographic revision of the genus]
- Lemke, D. E.(1988).A synopsis of Flacourtiaceae.Aliso 12:28-43. [Tribe Abatieae transferred from Flacourtiaceae to Passifloraceae]
