= Scyphostegia =

Scientific classification
- Kingdom: Plantae
- Clade: Tracheophytes
- Clade: Angiosperms
- Clade: Eudicots
- Clade: Rosids
- Order: Malpighiales
- Family: Salicaceae
- Subfamily: Scyphostegioideae
- Genus: Scyphostegia; Stapf
- Species: S. borneensis

Binomial name
- Scyphostegia borneensis Stapf

Family of shrubs and trees

Scyphostegia borneensis is a species of shrub or small tree endemic to Borneo. This unusual plant is the only species in the genus Scyphostegia. In many taxonomic classifications the genus was placed in its own family, the Scyphostegiaceae. Analyses of DNA data indicated that the species is related to a group of species of the now defunct Flacourtiaceae, a group which is now placed in a broadly circumscribed Salicaceae.
