= Dianyuea =

Scientific classification
- Kingdom: Plantae
- Clade: Tracheophytes
- Clade: Angiosperms
- Clade: Eudicots
- Clade: Rosids
- Order: Malpighiales
- Family: Salicaceae
- Subfamily: Scyphostegioideae
- Genus: Dianyuea (H.J.Dong & H.Peng) C.Shang, S.Liao & Z.X.Zhang
- Species: D. turbinata

Binomial name
- Dianyuea turbinata (H.J.Dong & H.Peng) C.Shang, S.Liao & Z.X.Zhang

Synonyms
- Flacourtia turbinata H.J.Dong & H.Peng

Genus of flowering plants

Dianyuea is a monotypic genus of flowering plants in the family Salicaceae. It contains only one species, Dianyuea turbinata.

The species is primarily endemic to the subtropics of China in Chongqing, Guizhou, Hubei, Sichuan, and Yunnan, although very disjunct populations are found in Cameroon and Ghana.

== Taxonomy ==
Originally described in the genus Flacourtia (F. turbinata) based on limited material (no male individuals), this unusual species is now recognized as the sole member of the genus Dianyuea, and is the only other member of subfamily Scyphostegioideae of Salicaceae. In addition to phylogenetic analyses of DNA data, the species's basal placentation, connate stamen filaments, and seeds with arilloid appendages indicate that this species is related to Scyphostegia, a monotypic genus which is now placed in a broadly circumscribed Salicaceae.

The genus is named after Dian-Yue (Chinese: 滇越), an ancient kingdom on the Southern Silk Road, where the species is found.
