= Ophiobotrys =

Conservation status
- Least Concern (IUCN 3.1)

Scientific classification
- Kingdom: Plantae
- Clade: Tracheophytes
- Clade: Angiosperms
- Clade: Eudicots
- Clade: Rosids
- Order: Malpighiales
- Family: Salicaceae
- Subfamily: Samydoideae
- Genus: Ophiobotrys; Gilg
- Species: O. zenkeri

Binomial name
- Ophiobotrys zenkeri Gilg

Synonyms
- Osmelia zenkeri (Gilg) Hallier f.

Genus of trees

Ophiobotrys zenkeri is a species of flowering plant in the family Salicaceae. It is a tree native to tropical Africa from Ivory Coast to Gabon and is the only member of the genus Ophiobotrys. Formerly classified in the Flacourtiaceae, phylogenetic analyses based on DNA data indicate that this species, along with its close relatives in the Asian genera Osmelia and Pseudosmelia, are better placed in a broadly circumscribed Salicaceae. Ophiobotrys differs from its close relatives in having 5 sepals, 5(-6) stamens, one divided style, and terminal inflorescences.

The wood has several uses, and the species is known by several common names, including uolobo, urogbo, abuana, akwana, and bofan.
