= Homaliopsis =

Scientific classification
- Kingdom: Plantae
- Clade: Tracheophytes
- Clade: Angiosperms
- Clade: Eudicots
- Clade: Rosids
- Order: Malpighiales
- Family: Salicaceae
- Genus: Homaliopsis; S.Moore

Genus of plants

Homaliopsis is a genus of flowering plants belonging to the family Salicaceae.

Its native range is Madagascar.

Species:

- Homaliopsis forbesii S.Moore
