= Dissomeria =

Scientific classification
- Kingdom: Plantae
- Clade: Tracheophytes
- Clade: Angiosperms
- Clade: Eudicots
- Clade: Rosids
- Order: Malpighiales
- Family: Salicaceae
- Subfamily: Salicoideae
- Tribe: Homalieae
- Genus: Dissomeria; Hook.f. ex Benth.

Genus of plants

Dissomeria is a genus of flowering plants belonging to the family Salicaceae.

Its native range is Eastern and Western Central Tropical Africa.

Species:

- Dissomeria crenata Hook.f. ex Benth.
- Dissomeria glanduligera Sleumer
