= Pseudosmelia =

Scientific classification
- Kingdom: Plantae
- Clade: Tracheophytes
- Clade: Angiosperms
- Clade: Eudicots
- Clade: Rosids
- Order: Malpighiales
- Family: Salicaceae
- Subfamily: Samydoideae
- Genus: Pseudosmelia; Sleumer
- Species: P. moluccana

Binomial name
- Pseudosmelia moluccana Sleumer

Family of shrubs and trees

Pseudosmelia moluccana is a species of shrub or small tree native to Morotai and Halmahera of the Indonesian Maluku Islands and is the only member of the genus Pseudosmelia. Formerly classified in the Flacourtiaceae, phylogenetic analyses based on DNA data indicate that this species, along with its close relatives in the Asian genus Osmelia and the African genus Ophiobotrys, are better placed in a broadly circumscribed Salicaceae. Pseudosmelia differs from its close relatives in having thick, truncate staminodes and large, spindle-shaped fruits with numerous seeds.

Pseudosmelia moluccana is known by the common name "mutingut."
