= Bartholomaea =

Scientific classification
- Kingdom: Plantae
- Clade: Tracheophytes
- Clade: Angiosperms
- Clade: Eudicots
- Clade: Rosids
- Order: Malpighiales
- Family: Salicaceae
- Subfamily: Salicoideae
- Tribe: Homalieae
- Genus: Bartholomaea; Standley & Steyermark

Species
- 3; see text

Genus of flowering plants in the family Salicaceae

Bartholomaea is a genus of flowering plants in the family Salicaceae. The genus is native to southern Mexico, Guatemala, and Belize.

== Known species ==
The following species are accepted by Plants of the World Online:

- Bartholomaea mollis Standl. & Steyerm.
- Bartholomaea paniculata Lundell
- Bartholomaea sessiliflora (Standl.) Standl. & Steyerm.
