= Tisonia =

Scientific classification
- Kingdom: Plantae
- Clade: Tracheophytes
- Clade: Angiosperms
- Clade: Eudicots
- Clade: Rosids
- Order: Malpighiales
- Family: Salicaceae
- Subfamily: Salicoideae
- Tribe: Saliceae
- Genus: Tisonia; Baill.

Genus of flowering plants

Tisonia is a genus of flowering plants belonging to the family Salicaceae. It is also in the subfamily Salicoideae and tribe Saliceae.

It is native to Madagascar.

The genus name of Tisonia is in honour of Eugène Édouard Augustin Tison (1842–1932), French doctor and professor of botany. It was first described and published in Bull. Mens. Soc. Linn. Paris Vol.1 on page 568 in 1886.

== Known species ==
According to Kew,

- Tisonia baronii Danguy
- Tisonia capuronii Sleumer
- Tisonia cloiselii Danguy
- Tisonia coriacea Scott Elliot
- Tisonia coursii H.Perrier
- Tisonia crenata Sleumer
- Tisonia danguyana H.Perrier
- Tisonia ficulnea Baill.
- Tisonia glabrata Baill.
- Tisonia humbertii H.Perrier
- Tisonia keraudrenae Leandri
- Tisonia leandriana H.Perrier
- Tisonia palmatinervis Sleumer
- Tisonia rubescens Danguy
