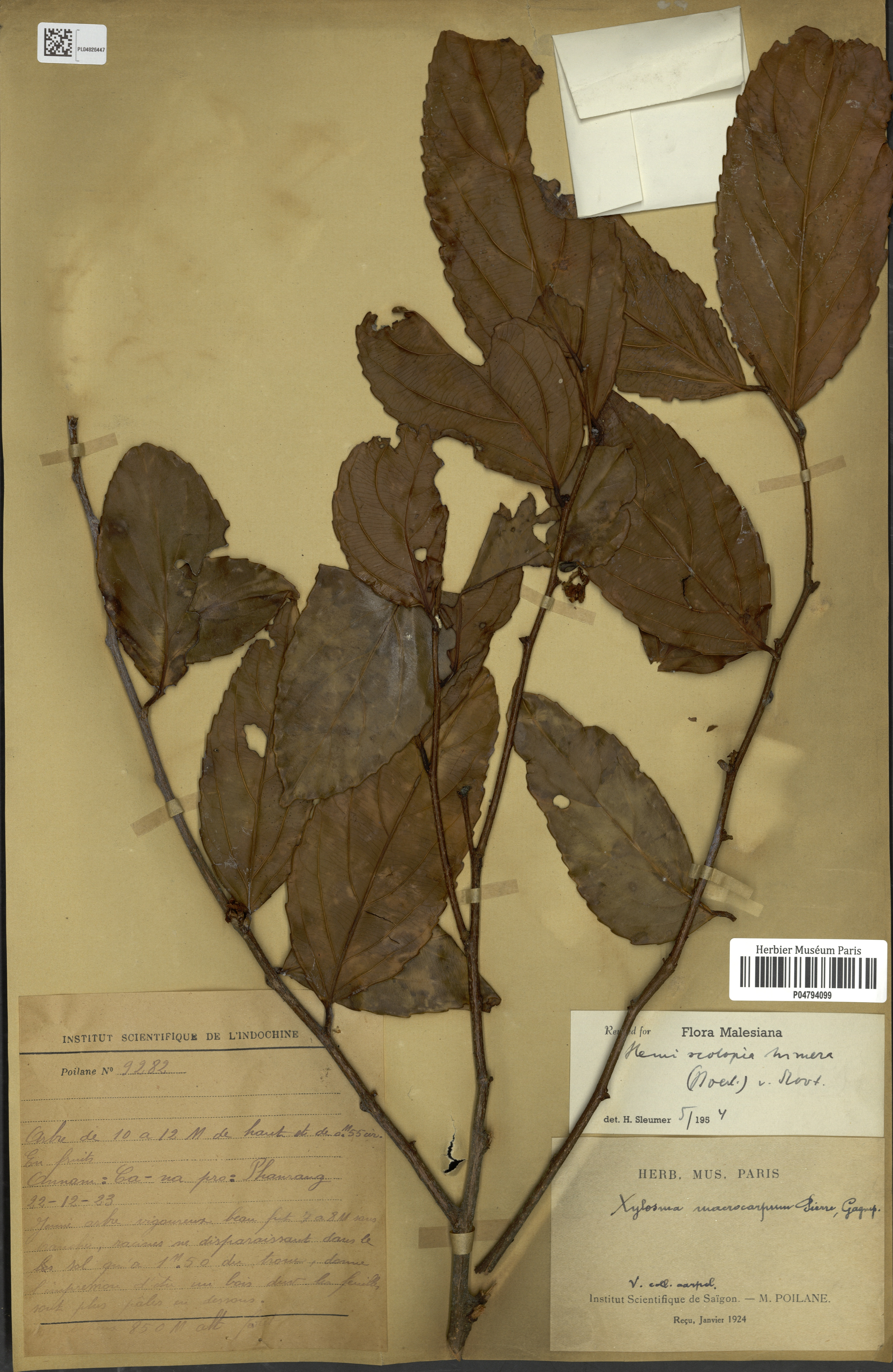
- Herbarium specimen

Scientific classification
- Kingdom: Plantae
- Clade: Tracheophytes
- Clade: Angiosperms
- Clade: Eudicots
- Clade: Rosids
- Order: Malpighiales
- Family: Salicaceae
- Subfamily: Salicoideae
- Tribe: Scolopieae
- Genus: Hemiscolopia; Slooten
- Species: H. trimera

Binomial name
- Hemiscolopia trimera (Boerl.) Slooten

= Hemiscolopia =

Genus of plants

Hemiscolopia is a genus of flowering plants belonging to the family Salicaceae. It contains a single species, Hemiscolopia trimera.

Its native range is Indo-China to Western Malesia.
