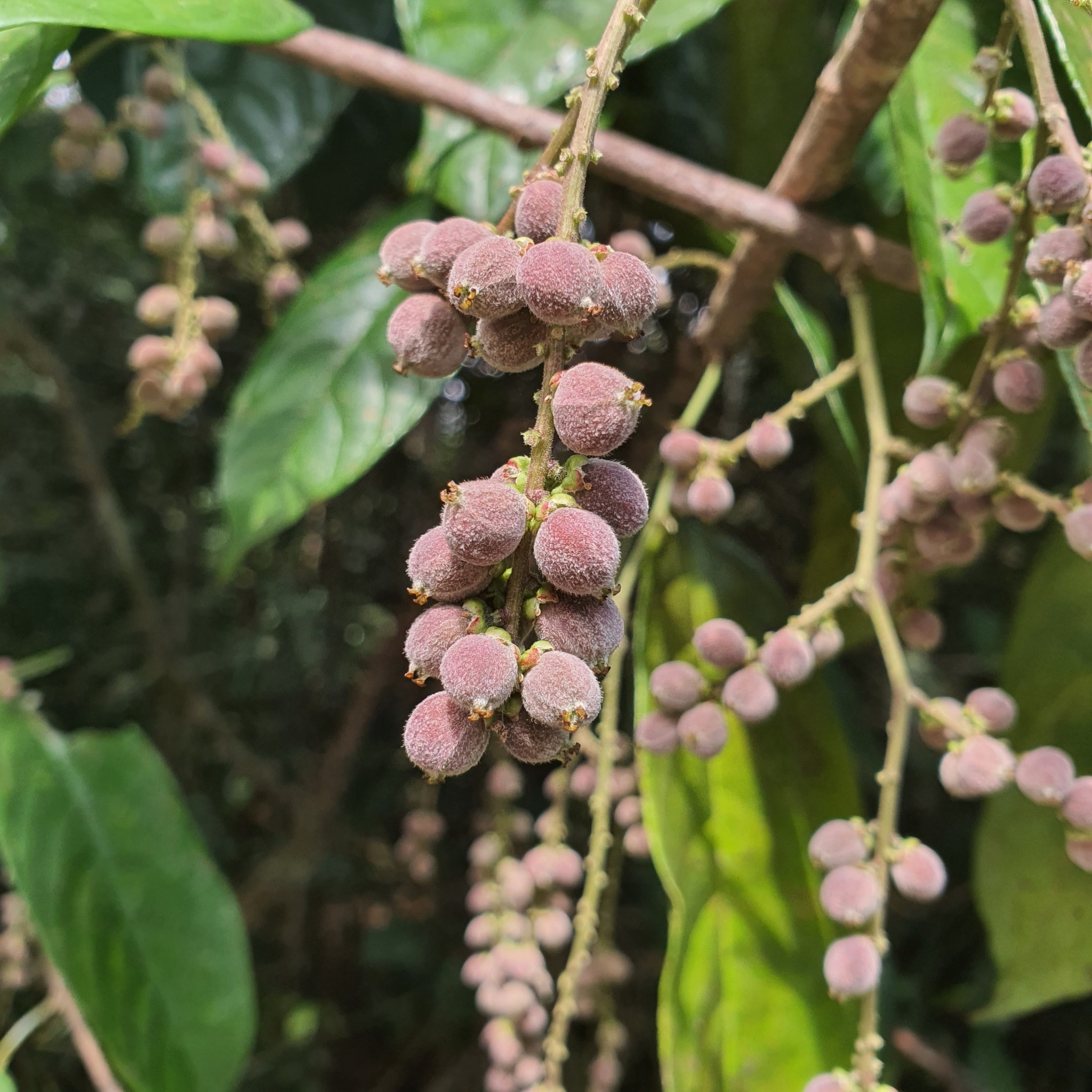
- Osmelia grandistipulata in Singapore

Scientific classification
- Kingdom: Plantae
- Clade: Tracheophytes
- Clade: Angiosperms
- Clade: Eudicots
- Clade: Rosids
- Order: Malpighiales
- Family: Salicaceae
- Subfamily: Samydoideae
- Genus: Osmelia; Thwaites

Type species
- Osmelia gardneri Thwaites

Species
- Four (4). See text.

Synonyms
- Stachycrater Turcz.

= Osmelia =

Genus of flowering plants

Osmelia is a genus of flowering plants in the willow family, Salicaceae. Osmelia includes four species of trees native to Sri Lanka and Southeast Asia. Osmelia is closely related to the monotypic Pseudosmelia of Morotai and Halmahera of the Indonesian Maluku Islands and to the monotypic Ophiobotrys from west and west-central tropical Africa.

== List of species ==
- Osmelia gardneri Thwaites
- Osmelia grandistipulata Slooten
- Osmelia maingayi King
- Osmelia philippina (Turcz.) Benth.
