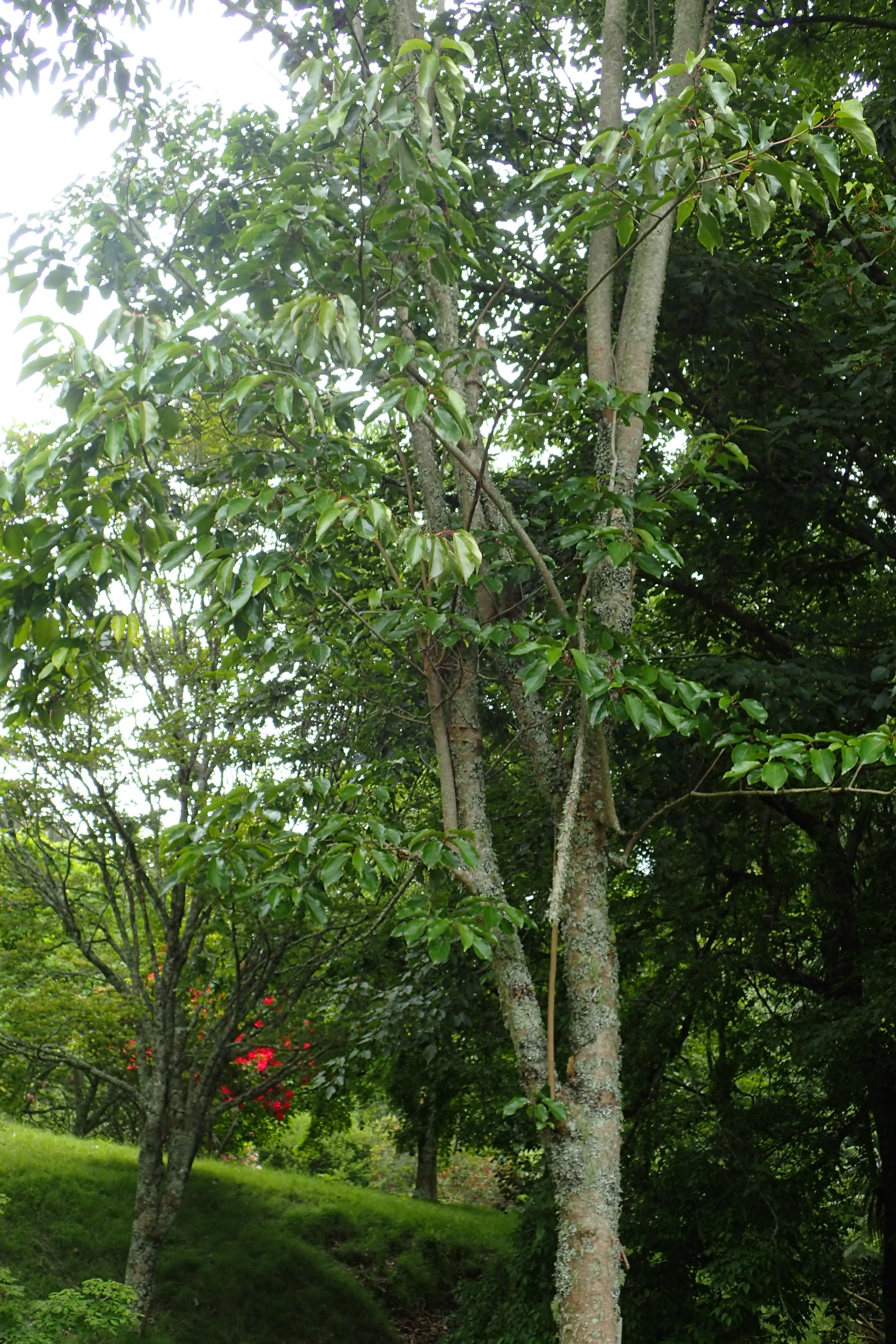
- Carrierea calycina

Scientific classification
- Kingdom: Plantae
- Clade: Tracheophytes
- Clade: Angiosperms
- Clade: Eudicots
- Clade: Rosids
- Order: Malpighiales
- Family: Salicaceae
- Subfamily: Salicoideae
- Tribe: Saliceae
- Genus: Carrierea; Franch.

Species
- 3; see text

= Carrierea =

Genus of flowering plants in the family Salicaceae

Carrierea is a genus of flowering plants in the family Salicaceae.

The genus spans throughout central-southern China and Indochina.

== Known species ==
The following species are accepted by Plants of the World Online:

- Carrierea calycina Franch.
- Carrierea dunniana H.Lév.
- Carrierea vieillardii Gagnep.
