= Neoptychocarpus =

Scientific classification
- Kingdom: Plantae
- Clade: Tracheophytes
- Clade: Angiosperms
- Clade: Eudicots
- Clade: Rosids
- Order: Malpighiales
- Family: Salicaceae
- Subfamily: Samydoideae
- Genus: Neoptychocarpus; Buchheim

Genus of plants

Neoptychocarpus is a genus of flowering plants belonging to the family Salicaceae.

Its native range is Southern Tropical America.

== Species ==
Species:

- Neoptychocarpus apodanthus (Kuhlm.) Buchheim
- Neoptychocarpus chocoensis A.H.Gentry & Forero
- Neoptychocarpus killipii (Monach.) Buchheim
