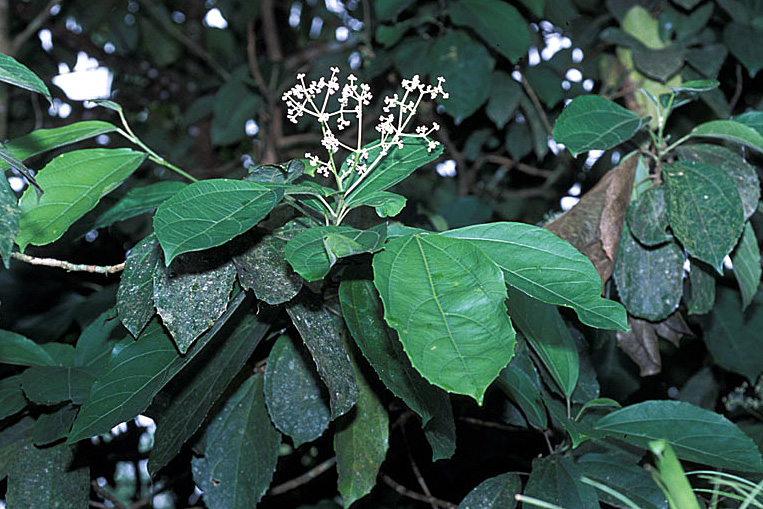
- Hasseltia floribunda

Scientific classification
- Kingdom: Plantae
- Clade: Tracheophytes
- Clade: Angiosperms
- Clade: Eudicots
- Clade: Rosids
- Order: Malpighiales
- Family: Salicaceae
- Subfamily: Salicoideae
- Tribe: Prockieae
- Genus: Hasseltia; Kunth

Type species
- Hasseltia floribunda Kunth

Species
- 6; see text

= Hasseltia =

Genus of trees

Hasseltia is a genus of flowering plants in the family Salicaceae. It contains four species of small to medium-sized trees native to the neotropics, ranging from Mexico south to Brazil and Bolivia. The genus is named for the Dutch physician and botanist Johan Conrad van Hasselt.

Hasseltia is unique among Salicaceae in that the species have pseudo-axile placentation, compound umbellate inflorescences, and a pair of glands embedded in the base of the leaf blades. Formerly placed in the heterogeneous family Flacourtiaceae, Hasseltia is now classified in Salicaceae, along with close relatives Pleuranthodendron and Macrothumia, with which they are commonly confused.

== Known species ==
The following species are accepted by World Flora Online and Plants of the World Online:

- Hasseltia allenii Hammel & Grayum
- Hasseltia crassa W.Palacios
- Hasseltia floribunda Kunth
- Hasseltia guatemalensis Warb.
- Hasseltia laterifolia Rusby
- Hasseltia yanachagaensis Vázquez & A.Monteag.
