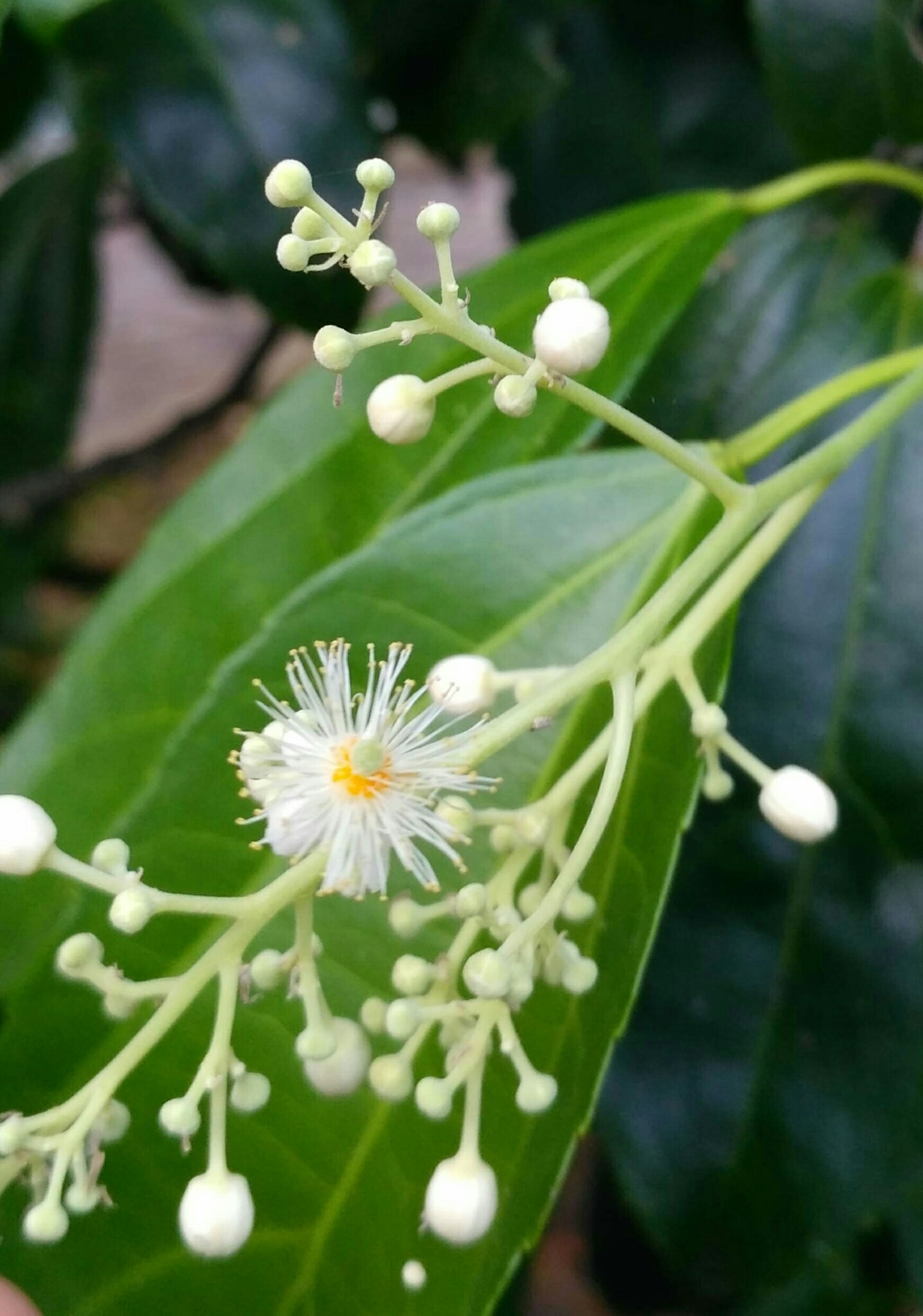
- Pleuranthodendron lindenii in Mexico

Conservation status
- Least Concern (IUCN 3.1)

Scientific classification
- Kingdom: Plantae
- Clade: Tracheophytes
- Clade: Angiosperms
- Clade: Eudicots
- Clade: Rosids
- Order: Malpighiales
- Family: Salicaceae
- Subfamily: Salicoideae
- Tribe: Prockieae
- Genus: Pleuranthodendron; L.O.Williams
- Species: P. lindenii

Binomial name
- Pleuranthodendron lindenii (Turcz.) Sleumer

= Pleuranthodendron =

Genus of flowering plants

Pleuranthodendron is a genus of flowering plants in the family Salicaceae. It consists of one species (Pleuranthodendron lindenii) of small to medium-sized trees native to the neotropics, specifically Mexico, Central America and northern South America.

Formerly placed in the heterogeneous family Flacourtiaceae, Pleuranthodendron is now classified in Salicaceae, along with close relatives Hasseltia and Macrothumia, with which they are commonly confused.
