= Piparea =

Scientific classification
- Kingdom: Plantae
- Clade: Tracheophytes
- Clade: Angiosperms
- Clade: Eudicots
- Clade: Rosids
- Order: Malpighiales
- Family: Salicaceae
- Subfamily: Samydoideae
- Genus: Piparea; Aubl.

Type species
- Piparea dentata Aubl.

Species
- 3; see text

Synonyms
- Chaetocrater Raf.

Genus of plants

Piparea is a genus of flowering plants belonging to the family Salicaceae.

Its native range is Southern Mexico to Southern Tropical America.

== Known species ==
The following species are accepted by Plants of the World Online:

- Piparea dentata Aubl.
- Piparea multiflora C.F.Gaertn.
- Piparea spruceana (Benth. ex Eichler) T.Samar. & M.H.Alford
