= Mocquerysia (plant) =

Scientific classification
- Kingdom: Plantae
- Clade: Tracheophytes
- Clade: Angiosperms
- Clade: Eudicots
- Clade: Rosids
- Order: Malpighiales
- Family: Salicaceae
- Genus: Mocquerysia; Hua

Genus of flowering plant

Mocquerysia is a genus of flowering plants belonging to the family Salicaceae.

Its native range is western central Tropical Africa. It is found in Cabinda (in Angola), Congo, Gabon and Zaïre.,

The genus name of Mocquerysia is in honour of Albert Mocquerys (1860–1926), a French dentist, who was also an entomologist, naturalist and explorer. He collected plants and insects in Africa and Venezuela. It was first described and published in J. Bot. (Morot) Vol.7 on page 259 in 1893.

== Species ==
According to Kew:

- Mocquerysia distans Breteler
- Mocquerysia multiflora Hua
