= Byrsanthus =

Scientific classification
- Kingdom: Plantae
- Clade: Tracheophytes
- Clade: Angiosperms
- Clade: Eudicots
- Clade: Rosids
- Order: Malpighiales
- Family: Salicaceae
- Subfamily: Salicoideae
- Tribe: Homalieae
- Genus: Byrsanthus; Guill.
- Species: B. brownii

Binomial name
- Byrsanthus brownii Guill.

Genus of flowering plants in the family Salicaceae

Byrsanthus is a genus of flowering plants belonging to the family Salicaceae. It contains a single species, Byrsanthus brownii.

Its native range is Western Tropical Africa.
