= Bembicia =

Scientific classification
- Kingdom: Plantae
- Clade: Tracheophytes
- Clade: Angiosperms
- Clade: Eudicots
- Clade: Rosids
- Order: Malpighiales
- Family: Salicaceae
- Subfamily: Salicoideae
- Tribe: Bembicieae; Warb.
- Genus: Bembicia; Oliv.
- Species: B. axillaris

Binomial name
- Bembicia axillaris Oliv.

Genus of flowering plants

Bembicia is a genus of flowering plants belonging to the family Salicaceae. It contains a single species, Bembicia axillaris.

Its native range is Madagascar.
