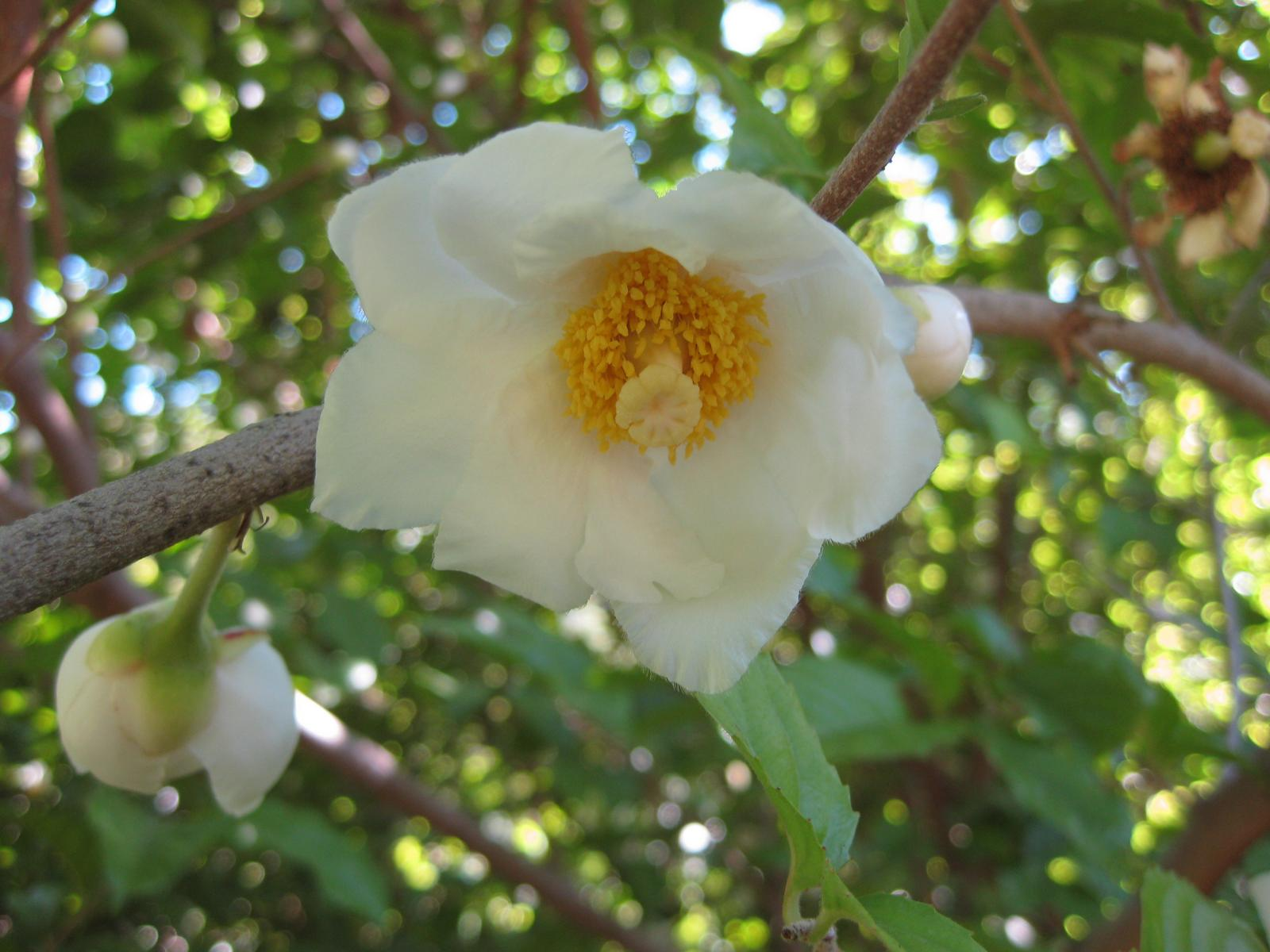
- Oncoba spinosa

Scientific classification
- Kingdom: Plantae
- Clade: Tracheophytes
- Clade: Angiosperms
- Clade: Eudicots
- Clade: Rosids
- Order: Malpighiales
- Family: Salicaceae
- Genus: Oncoba; Forssk., 1775

Species
- 4; see text

Synonyms
- Lundia Schumach. & Thonn.

= Oncoba =

Genus of flowering plants in the family Salicaceae

Oncoba is a genus of flowering plants in the family Salicaceae.

== Known species ==
The following species are accepted by Plants of the World Online:

- Oncoba brachyanthera Oliv.
- Oncoba breteleri Hul
- Oncoba routledgei Sprague
- Oncoba spinosa Forssk.

== Distribution ==
Oncoba has a very wide range over Africa, but it also extends into the Arabian Peninsula, to parts of Yemen and Saudi Arabia. The genus stretches from Mali to eastern South Africa within its home continent. The genus was introduced to parts of North America, where it grows in Florida and Cuba.
