= Neopringlea =

Scientific classification
- Kingdom: Plantae
- Clade: Tracheophytes
- Clade: Angiosperms
- Clade: Eudicots
- Clade: Rosids
- Order: Malpighiales
- Family: Salicaceae
- Subfamily: Salicoideae
- Tribe: Homalieae
- Genus: Neopringlea; S.Watson

Synonyms
- Henningsocarpum Kuntze; Llavea Liebm.

Genus of flowering plant

Neopringlea is a genus of flowering plants belonging to the family Salicaceae.

It is native to Mexico and Guatemala.

The genus name of Neopringlea is in honour of Cyrus Pringle (1838–1911), an American botanist who spent a career of 35 years cataloguing the plants of North America. He was also a prolific collector and accomplished botanical explorer. It was first described and published in Proc. Amer. Acad. Arts vol.26 on page 134 in 1891.

== Known species ==
According to Kew:

- Neopringlea integrifolia (Hemsl.) S.Watson
- Neopringlea viscosa (Liebm.) Rose
