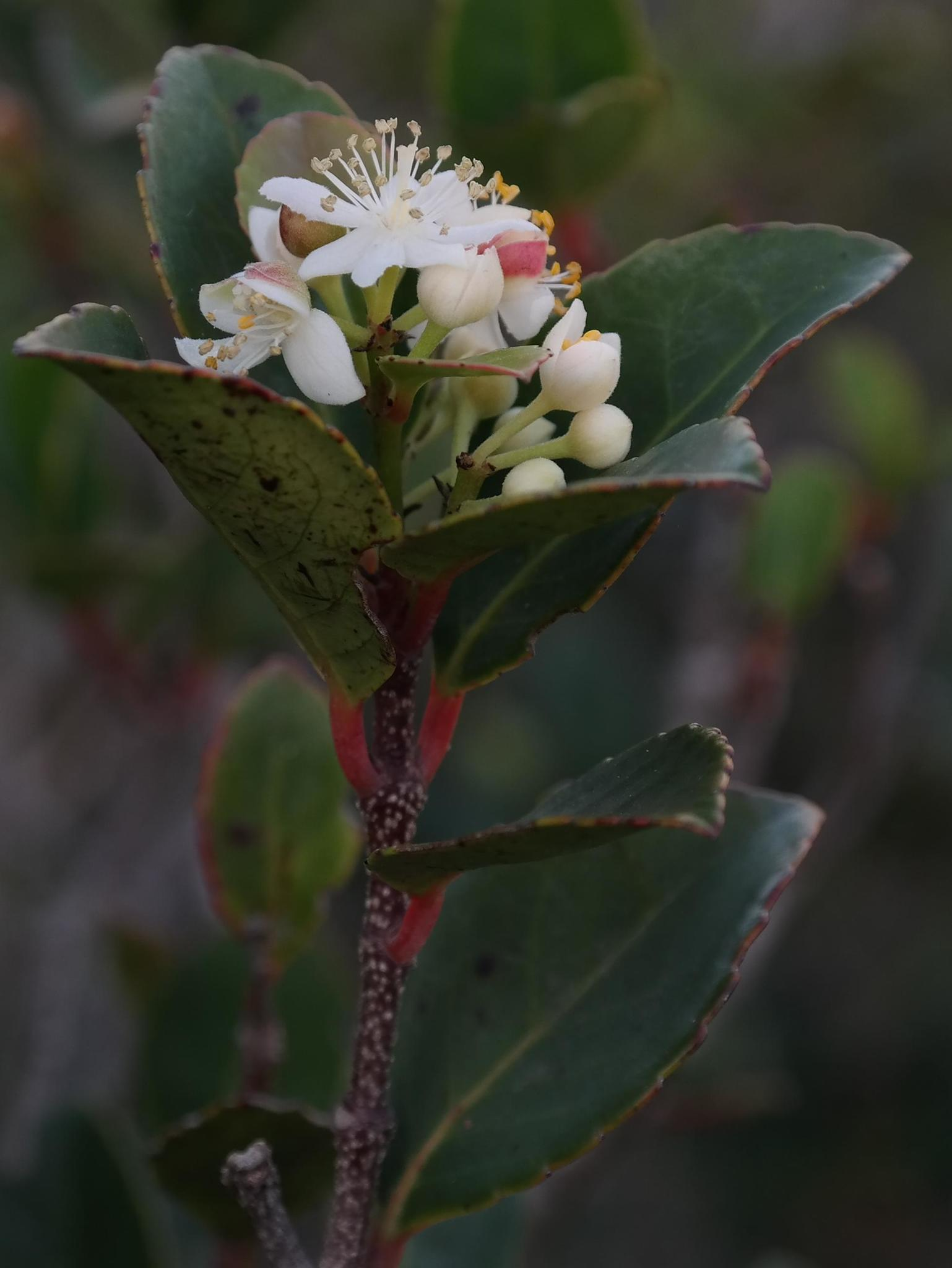
- In Eastern Cape, South Africa

Conservation status
- Near Threatened (IUCN 3.1)

Scientific classification
- Kingdom: Plantae
- Clade: Tracheophytes
- Clade: Angiosperms
- Clade: Eudicots
- Clade: Rosids
- Order: Malpighiales
- Family: Salicaceae
- Subfamily: Salicoideae
- Tribe: Scolopieae
- Genus: Pseudoscolopia; Gilg
- Species: P. polyantha

Binomial name
- Pseudoscolopia polyantha Gilg (1917)

Synonyms
- Pseudoscolopia fraseri E.Phillips (1926)

= Pseudoscolopia =

Genus of flowering plants

Pseudoscolopia is a genus of plants in the family Salicaceae, which contains a single species, Pseudoscolopia polyantha. It is endemic to South Africa, where it is native to the Cape Provinces and KwaZulu-Natal. It is threatened by habitat loss.
