= Gilbert Mandon =

French mining engineer and botanist (1799–1866)

Gilbert Mandon (1799 – 1866) was a French mining engineer and botanist. Mandon is noted for his botanical work during the mid-nineteenth century while he was the director of a mine in Tipuani, Bolivia from 1848 to 1861. He collected over 1800 plants in the region between Tipuani and Sorata. Much of this collection is now housed in the herbarium of the Grand National Museum of Natural History in Paris. He also collected plant specimens in the Canary Islands, Portugal, and Tunisia. Mandon edited several exsiccata-like series, one of them with the title Algae Maderenses, another with the title Plantae Andium Boliviensium. He initially trained to be a theologian and while in Paris worked as a tutor and secretary. Mandon closely connected to the species Tarasa mandonii .
