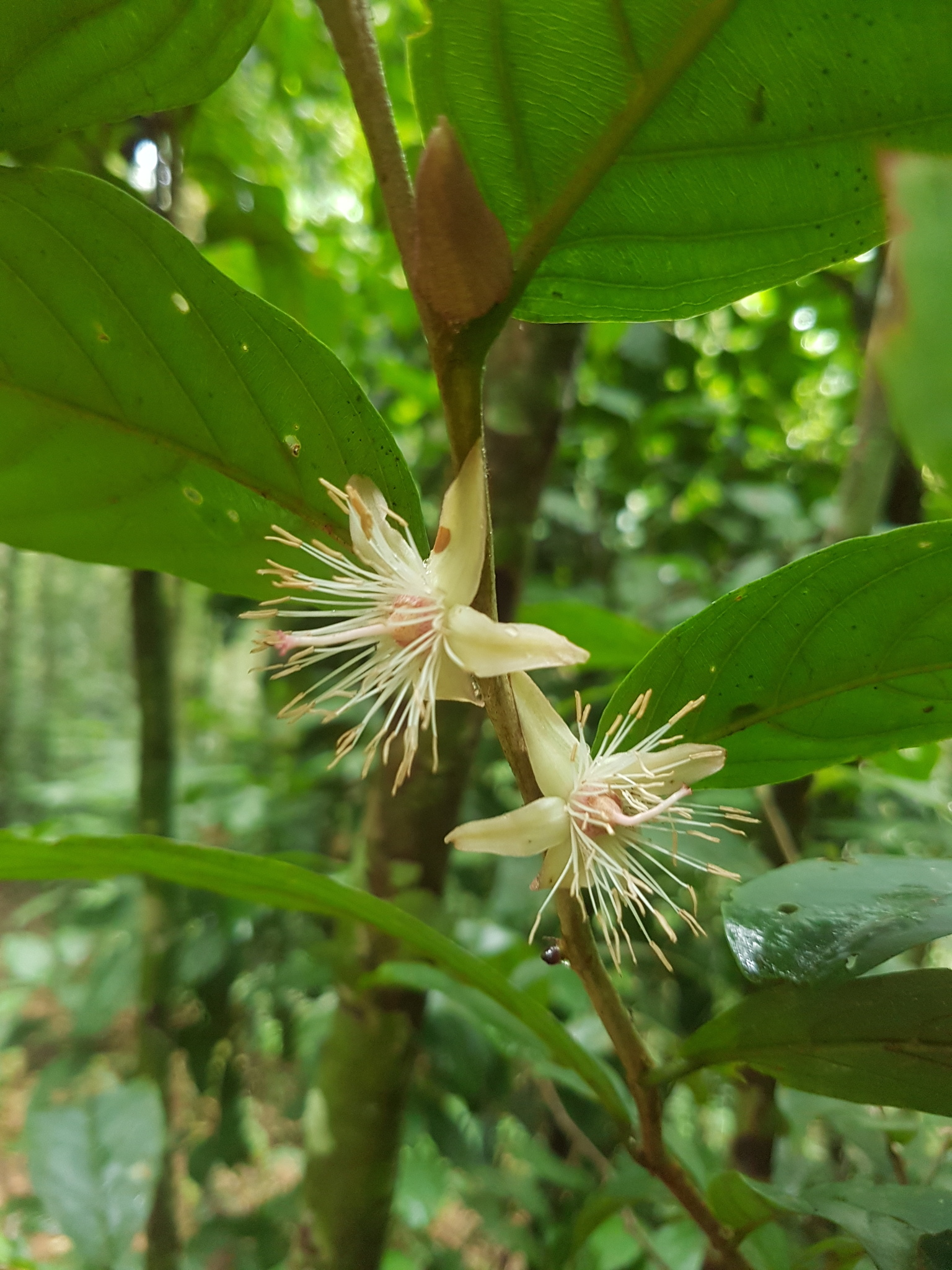
- Ryania speciosa in Peru

Scientific classification
- Kingdom: Plantae
- Clade: Tracheophytes
- Clade: Angiosperms
- Clade: Eudicots
- Clade: Rosids
- Order: Malpighiales
- Family: Salicaceae
- Subfamily: Samydoideae
- Genus: Ryania; Vahl

= Ryania =

Genus of flowering plants

Ryania is a genus of flowering plants in the family Salicaceae; it was previously listed in the now defunct family Flacourtiaceae.

The genus is significant partly because the alkaloid ryanodine was originally extracted from Ryania speciosa.

The Catalogue of Life includes these species:

- Ryania angustifolia
- Ryania canescens
- Ryania dentata
- Ryania mansoana
- Ryania pyrifera
- Ryania riedeliana
- Ryania sauricida
- Ryania speciosa
- Ryania spruceana
