= Trichostephanus =

Scientific classification
- Kingdom: Plantae
- Clade: Tracheophytes
- Clade: Angiosperms
- Clade: Eudicots
- Clade: Rosids
- Order: Malpighiales
- Family: Salicaceae
- Subfamily: Samydoideae
- Genus: Trichostephanus; Gilg

Species
- 2; see text

Genus of flowering plants in the family Salicaceae

Trichostephanus is a genus of flowering plants in the family Salicaceae.

The genus ranges from Cameroon to Gabon.

== Known species ==
The following species are accepted by Plants of the World Online and World Flora Online:

- Trichostephanus acuminatus Gilg
- Trichostephanus gabonensis Breteler
