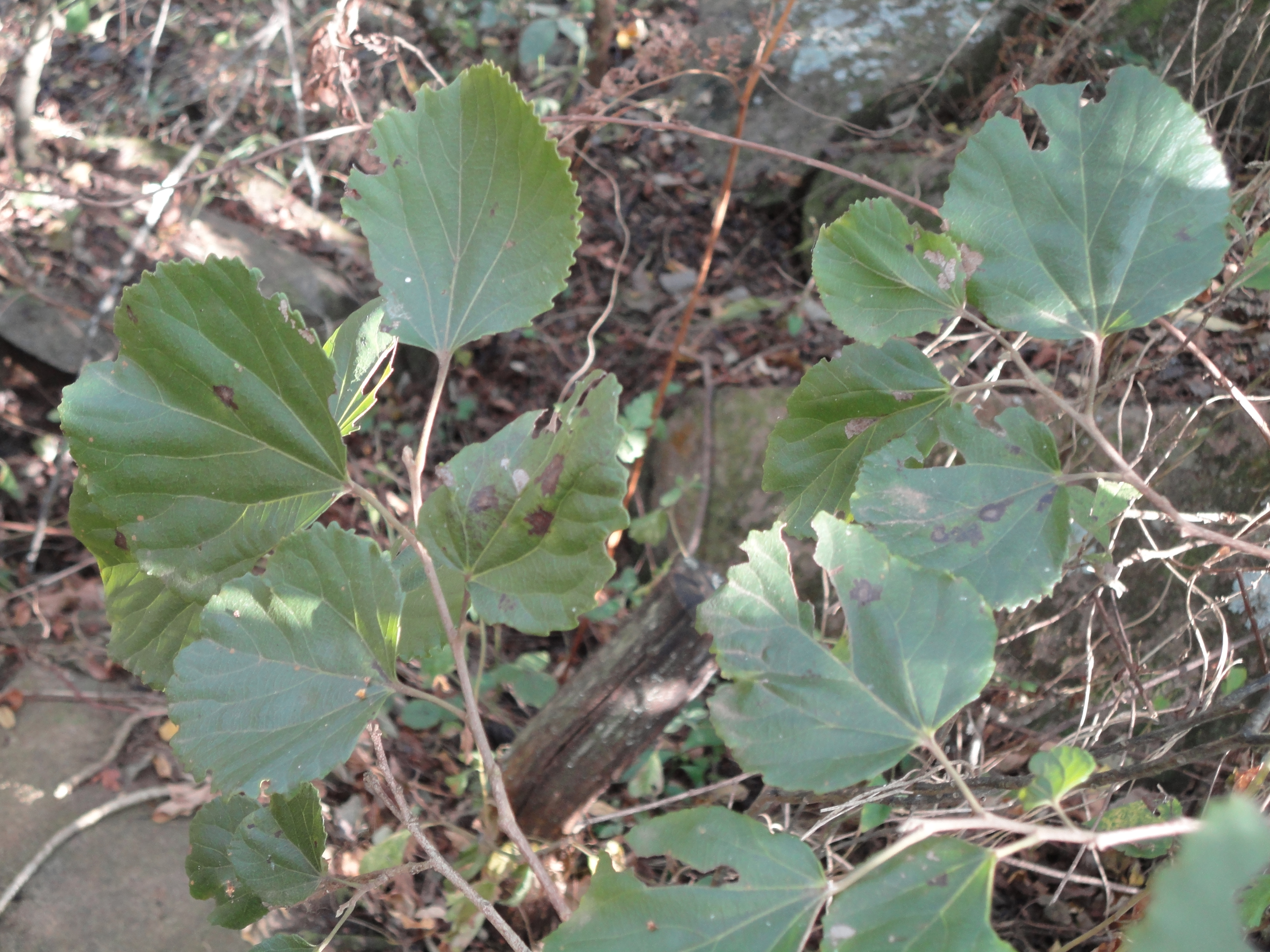
- Trimeria grandifolia

Scientific classification
- Kingdom: Plantae
- Clade: Tracheophytes
- Clade: Angiosperms
- Clade: Eudicots
- Clade: Rosids
- Order: Malpighiales
- Family: Salicaceae
- Subfamily: Salicoideae
- Tribe: Homalieae
- Genus: Trimeria; Harv.

Species
- 2; see text

Synonyms
- Monospora Hochst.; Renardia Turcz.

= Trimeria (plant) =

Genus of flowering plants

Trimeria is a genus of flowering plants belonging to the family Salicaceae.

It spans all across Sub-Saharan Africa, as far north as Ethiopia, and as far south as South Africa.

== Known species ==
The following species are accepted by Plants of the World Online:

- Trimeria grandifolia (Hochst.) Warb.
- Trimeria trinervis Harv.
