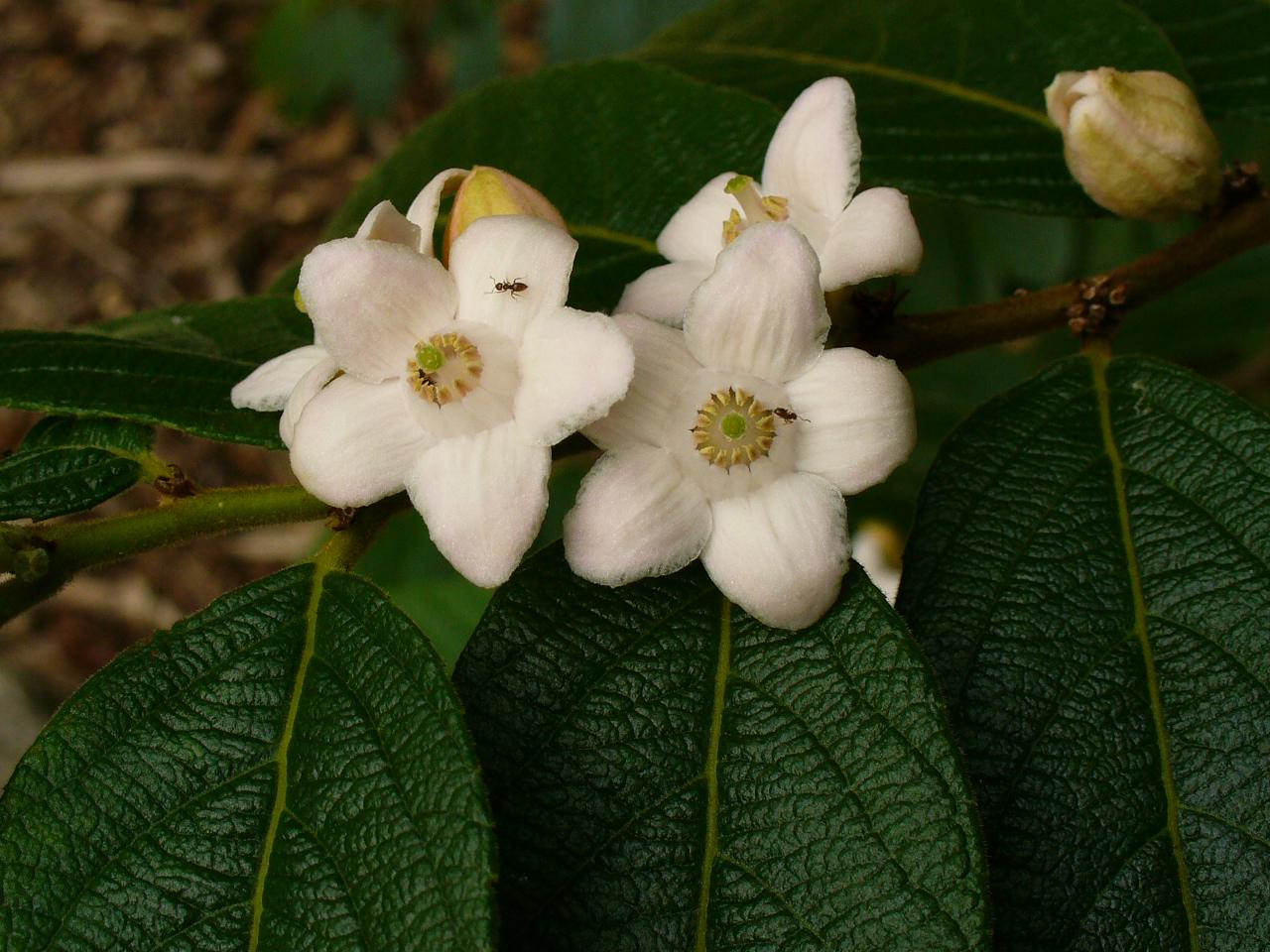
- Samyda dodecandra

Scientific classification
- Kingdom: Plantae
- Clade: Tracheophytes
- Clade: Angiosperms
- Clade: Eudicots
- Clade: Rosids
- Order: Malpighiales
- Family: Salicaceae
- Subfamily: Samydoideae
- Genus: Samyda; Jacq.

Species
- See text

Synonyms
- Guayabilla Sessé & Moc.; Guidonia (DC.) Griseb.; Guidonia Mill.

= Samyda =

Family of shrubs

Samyda is a genus of plants in family Salicaceae. There are 11 species, chiefly shrubs of the West Indies.

The calyx is quinquepartite and coloured, there is no corolla.

== Species ==
1. Samyda campanulata A. Borhidi & O. Muniz
2. Samyda cubensis P. Wilson
3. Samyda dodecandra Jacq.
4. Samyda glabrata Sw.
5. Samyda macrantha P. Wilson
6. Samyda mexicana Rose
7. Samyda ramosissima (Griseb.) J. E. Gut.
8. Samyda spinulosa Vent.
9. Samyda subintegra A. Borhidi & O. Muniz
10. Samyda villosa Sw.
11. Samyda yucatanensis Standl.
