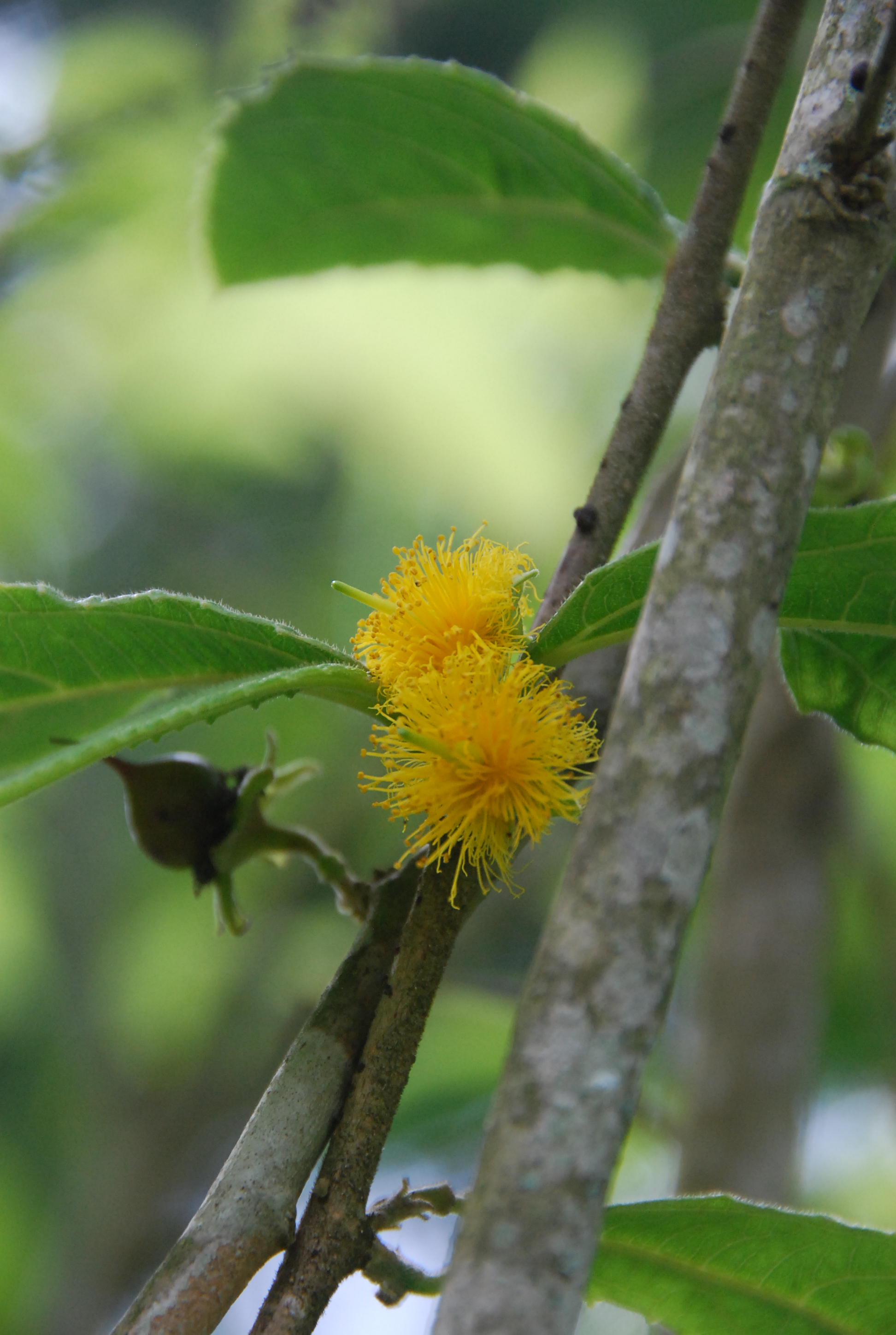
- Banara vanderbiltii

Scientific classification
- Kingdom: Plantae
- Clade: Tracheophytes
- Clade: Angiosperms
- Clade: Eudicots
- Clade: Rosids
- Order: Malpighiales
- Family: Salicaceae
- Subfamily: Salicoideae
- Tribe: Prockieae
- Genus: Banara; Aubl.

Species
- See text

= Banara =

Genus of flowering plants

Banara is a genus of flowering plants in the family Salicaceae (formerly in Flacourtiaceae).

Species accepted by the Plants of the World Online as of October 2022:

- Banara acunae Borhidi & O.Muñiz
- Banara arguta Briq.
- Banara axilliflora Sleumer
- Banara boliviana M.Nee
- Banara brasiliensis (Schott) Benth.
- Banara brittonii Roíg
- Banara caymanensis Proctor
- Banara cordifolia Urb. & Ekman
- Banara domingensis Benth.
- Banara excisa Urb. & Ekman
- Banara glauca (Kunth) Benth.
- Banara guianensis Aubl.
- Banara ibaguensis Tul.
- Banara larensis Steyerm.
- Banara leptophylla Urb. & Ekman
- Banara minutiflora (A.Rich.) Sleumer
- Banara nitida Spruce ex Benth.
- Banara orinocensis (Cuatrec.) Sleumer
- Banara parviflora (A.Gray) Benth.
- Banara portoricensis Krug & Urb.
- Banara quinquenervis Urb. & Ekman
- Banara regia Sandwith
- Banara riparia Sleumer
- Banara riscoi Borhidi & O.Muñiz
- Banara saxicola Urb. & Ekman
- Banara selleana Urb. & Ekman
- Banara serrata (Vell.) Warb.
- Banara splendens Urb.
- Banara tomentosa Clos
- Banara trinitatis Sleumer
- Banara ulmifolia (Kunth) Benth.
- Banara umbraticola Arechav.
- Banara vanderbiltii Urb.
- †Banara wilsonii Alain
