= Neosprucea =

Scientific classification
- Kingdom: Plantae
- Clade: Tracheophytes
- Clade: Angiosperms
- Clade: Eudicots
- Clade: Rosids
- Order: Malpighiales
- Family: Salicaceae
- Subfamily: Salicoideae
- Tribe: Prockieae
- Genus: Neosprucea; Sleumer

Species
- 10-11; see text

Genus of flowering plants in the family Salicaceae

Neosprucea is a genus of flowering plants in the family Salicaceae. There are ten species native to Panama and northern South America. The genus is distinctive in its poricidal anther dehiscence, large flowers (at least for the family), and usually acrodromous venation similar to that of the Melastomataceae. More than half of the species have been described since 2004.

== Known species ==
The following species are accepted by Plants of the World Online:

- Neosprucea grandiflora (Spruce ex Benth.) Sleumer
- Neosprucea melastomatoides M.H.Alford
- Neosprucea montana Cuatrec.
- Neosprucea paterna M.H.Alford
- Neosprucea pedicellata Little
- Neosprucea rimachii McDaniel ex M.H.Alford, Grández & Vásquez
- Neosprucea sararensis Cuatrec.
- Neosprucea sucumbiensis Cuatrec.
- Neosprucea tenuisepala M.H.Alford
- Neosprucea wilburiana M.H.Alford

Unplaced names according to World Flora Online:

- Neosprucea chrysantha Zapata-Corr. & Tobón-A.
