= Laetia =

Scientific classification
- Kingdom: Plantae
- Clade: Tracheophytes
- Clade: Angiosperms
- Clade: Eudicots
- Clade: Rosids
- Order: Malpighiales
- Family: Salicaceae
- Subfamily: Samydoideae
- Genus: Laetia; Loefl. ex L.

Species
- See text

Synonyms
- Guidonia P.Browne

Genus of flowering plants

Laetia is a genus of plants in the family Salicaceae (formerly placed in Flacourtiaceae).

== Species ==
- Laetia americana L.
- Laetia corymbulosa Spruce ex Benth.
- Laetia micrantha A.Robyns
- Laetia povedae N.Zamora, Aguilar & D.Santam.
- Laetia procera (Poepp.) Eichler
- Laetia scabra Spreng.
- Laetia suaveolens (Poepp.) Benth.
- Laetia ternstroemioides Griseb.
- Laetia thamnia L.
