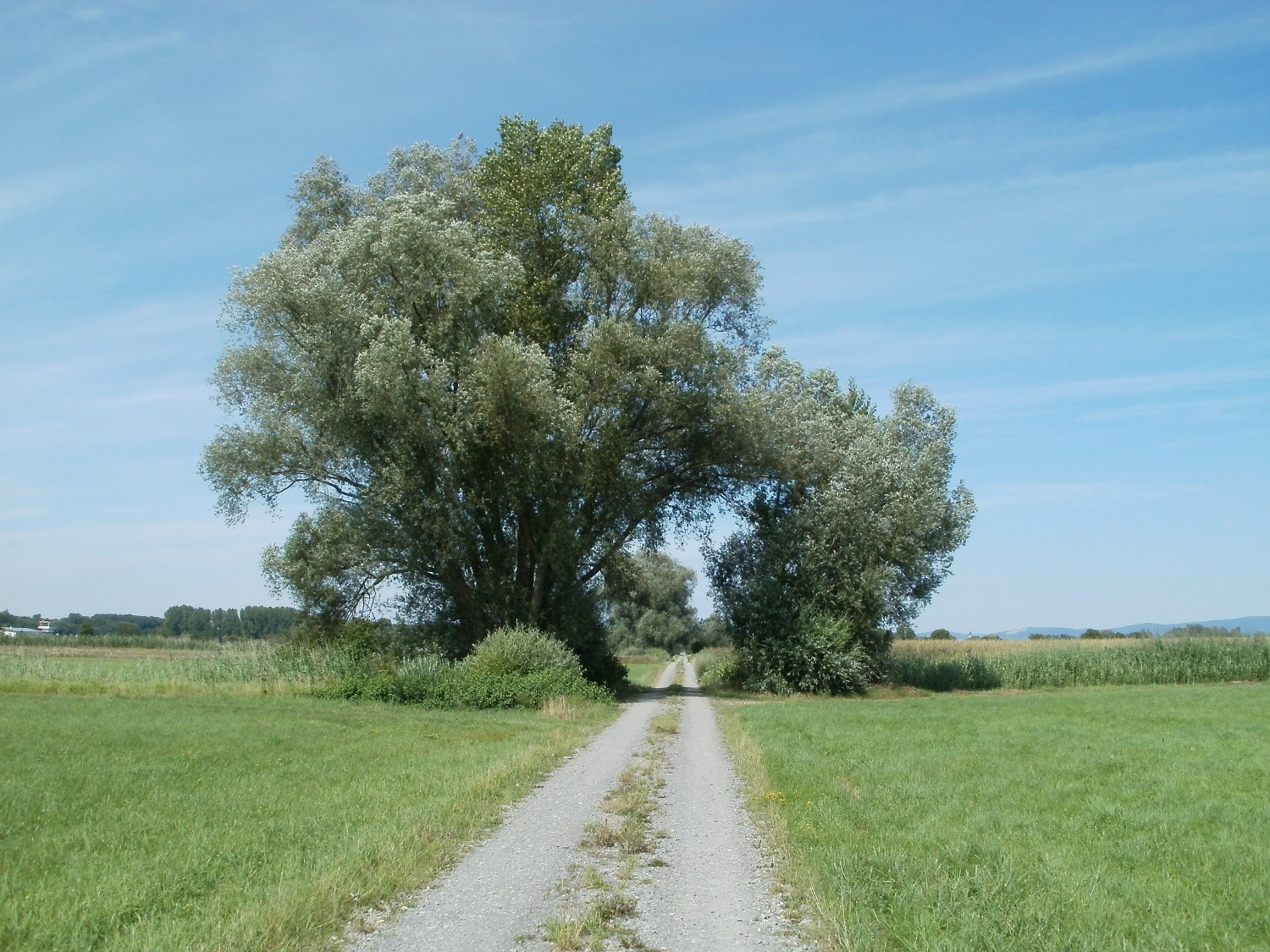
- Salix alba

Scientific classification
- Kingdom: Plantae
- Clade: Tracheophytes
- Clade: Angiosperms
- Clade: Eudicots
- Clade: Rosids
- Order: Malpighiales
- Family: Salicaceae; Mirb.

Subfamilies
- Salicoideae; Samydoideae; Scyphostegioideae

Synonyms
- Bembiciaceae; Caseariaceae; Flacourtiaceae; Homaliaceae; Poliothyrsidaceae; Prockiaceae; Samydaceae; Scyphostegiaceae

= Salicaceae =

Salicaceae Temporal range: Cretaceous – Recent 113–0 Ma

Family of plants

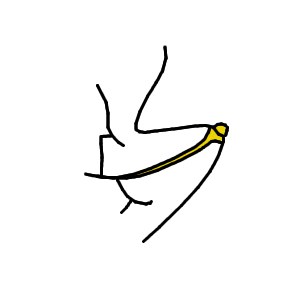
Illustration of a typical salicoid tooth, the yellow area showing the expanding leaf vein and glandular seta.

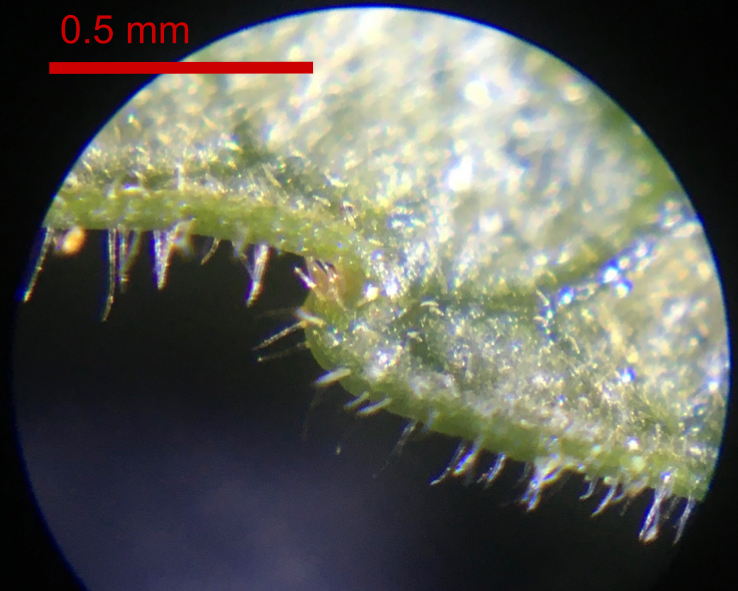
Populus trichocarpa leaf margin showing a salicoid tooth. The brownish-yellow area in the axil of the tooth is the glandular seta.

The Salicaceae are the willow family of flowering plants. The traditional family (Salicaceae sensu stricto) includes the willows and poplars. Genetic studies summarized by the Angiosperm Phylogeny Group (APG) have greatly expanded the circumscription of the family to contain 56 genera and about 1220 species, including the tropical Scyphostegiaceae and many of the former Flacourtiaceae.

In the Cronquist system, the Salicaceae were assigned to their own order, Salicales, and contained three genera, Salix, Populus, and Chosenia (now a synonym of Salix). Recognized to be closely related to the Violaceae and Passifloraceae, the family is placed by the APG in the order Malpighiales.

Under the new circumscription, most members of the family are trees or shrubs that have simple leaves with alternate arrangement, and temperate members are usually deciduous. Most members have serrate or dentate leaf margins, and many of those that have such toothed margins exhibit salicoid teeth, a salicoid tooth being one in which a vein enters the tooth, expands, and terminates at or near the apex, near which are spherical and glandular protuberances called setae. Sometimes the glands will deflate and appear torus (doughnut) shaped. Some members of the family exhibit violoid or theoid teeth, characters along with presence of an aril and introrse anther dehiscence that are sometimes used to split the family into three families, Salicaceae sensu medio, Samydaceae, and Scyphostegiaceae. Members of the family often have flowers which are reduced and inconspicuous, and all have ovaries that are superior or half-inferior with parietal placentation.

== Genera by subfamily and tribe ==
Salicaceae are divided into three subfamilies, with Salicoideae further divided into seven tribes. Several of these tribes are not monophyletic and await further revision.

=== Salicoideae ===
Abatieae

- Abatia Ruiz & Pavón (now including Aphaerema)

Bembicieae

- Bembicia Oliver

Flacourtieae

- Azara Ruiz & Pavón
- Bennettiodendron Merrill
- Carrierea Franchet
- Dovyalis Arnott
- Flacourtia L'Heritier
- Idesia Maximowicz
- Itoa Hemsley
- Ludia de Jussieu
- Olmediella Baillon
- Oncoba Forsskahl
- Poliothyrsis Oliver
- Tisonia Baillon
- Xylosma G. Forster (now including Priamosia and Lasiochlamys)

Homalieae

- Bartholomaea Standley & Steyermark
- Bivinia Tulasne
- Byrsanthus Guillemin
- Calantica Tulasne
- Dissomeria Bentham
- Homalium Jacquin
- Neopringlea S. Watson
- Trimeria Harvey

Prockieae

- Ahernia Merrill
- Banara Aublet
- Hasseltia Kunth
- Hasseltiopsis Sleumer
- Macrohasseltia L. O. Williams
- Macrothumia M.H.Alford
- Neosprucea Sleumer
- Pineda Ruiz & Pavón
- Pleuranthodendron L. O. Williams
- Prockia L.

Saliceae

- Populus L.
- †Pseudosalix Boucher, Manchester, & Judd
- Salix L.

Scolopieae

- Hemiscolopia van Slooten
- Pseudoscolopia Gilg
- Scolopia Schreber

=== Samydoideae ===
- Casearia Jacquin (including Hecatostemon, Laetia, Samyda, & Zuelania)
- Euceraea Martius
- Irenodendron Alford & Dement
- Lunania Hooker
- Neoptychocarpus Buchheim
- Ophiobotrys Gilg
- Osmelia Thwaites (now including Pseudosmelia)
- Piparea Aublet
- Ryania Vahl
- Tetrathylacium Poeppig & Endlicher
- Trichostephanus Gilg

=== Scyphostegioideae ===
- Dianyuea C. Shang et al.
- Scyphostegia Stapf

=== Incertae sedis ===
- †Saxifragispermum Reid & Chandler
- †Utkholokia (Cheleb.) Iljinskaja & Chelb.
