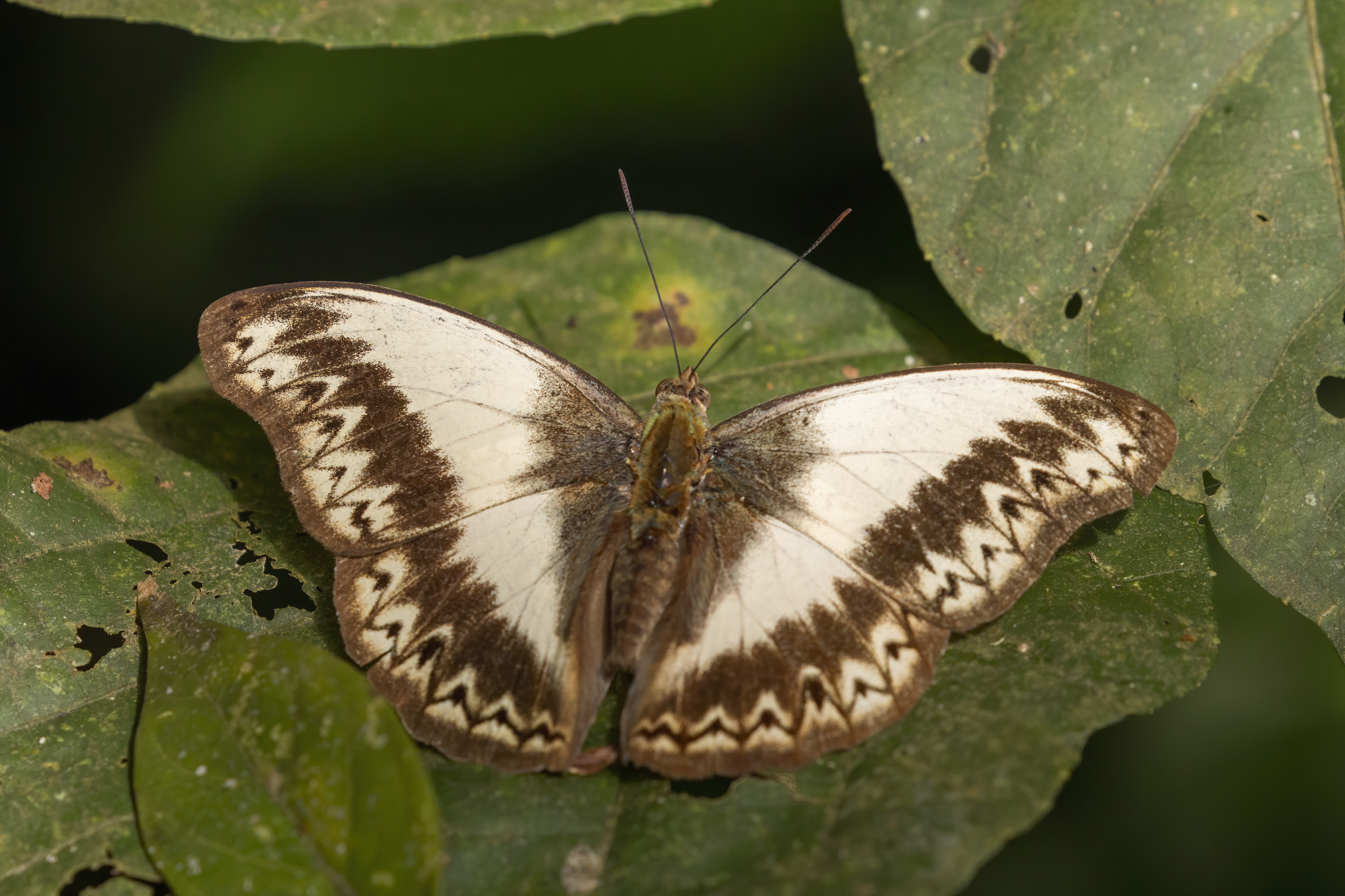
- Male, Uganda

Scientific classification
- Kingdom: Animalia
- Phylum: Arthropoda
- Clade: Pancrustacea
- Class: Insecta
- Order: Lepidoptera
- Family: Nymphalidae
- Genus: Cymothoe
- Species: C. herminia

Binomial name
- Cymothoe herminia (Grose-Smith, 1887)

Synonyms
- Harma herminia Grose-Smith, 1887; Cymothoe sultani Bryk, 1915; Cymothoe siegfriedi Bryk, 1915; Cymothoe herminia var. poensis Holland, 1920; Cymothoe herminia var. vulcanica Schultze, 1920; Harma johnstoni Butler, 1902; Cymothoe herminia johnstoni f. confluens van Someren, 1939; Cymothoe herminia johnstoni f. bipartita van Someren, 1939; Cymothoe herminia johnstoni f. kakamega van Someren, 1939; Cymothoe herminia johnstoni f. budongo van Someren, 1939; Cymothoe overlaeti Overlaet, 1942; Cymothoe herminia; r. katshokwe Overlaet, 1940: Cymothoe herminia katshokwe f. kaluundu Overlaet, 1940; Cymothoe herminia katshokwe var. interrupta Overlaet, 1940; Cymothoe herminia katshokwe f. diffusa Overlaet, 1942; Cymothoe herminia katshokwe f. burgeoni Overlaet, 1942; Cymothoe herminia katshokwe f. praeformata Overlaet, 1942

= Cymothoe herminia =

Herminia glider

Species of butterfly

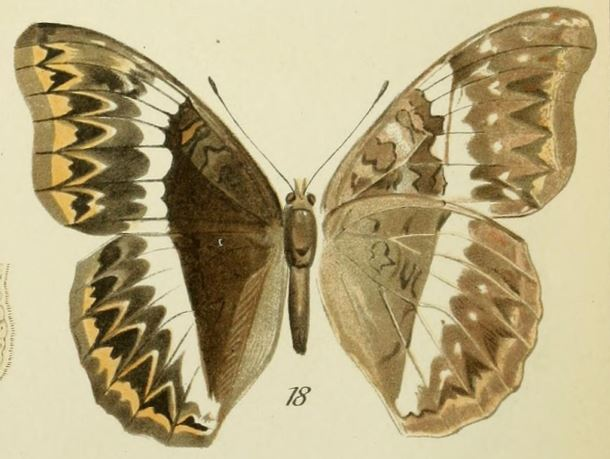
Female

Cymothoe herminia, the Herminia glider, is a butterfly in the family Nymphalidae. It is found in Sierra Leone, Liberia, Ivory Coast, Ghana, Nigeria, Cameroon, Equatorial Guinea, the Republic of the Congo, the Central African Republic, the Democratic Republic of the Congo, Uganda, Kenya, Tanzania and Zambia. The habitat consists of lowland to submontane forests.

Adults are attracted to fermented fruit.

The larvae feed on Dovyalis, Rawsonia and Dasylepis species.

== Subspecies ==
- Cymothoe herminia herminia (eastern Nigeria, Cameroon, Equatorial Guinea, Congo, Central African Republic, Democratic Republic of the Congo: Ituri Forest)
- Cymothoe herminia gongoa Fox, 1965 (Sierra Leone, Liberia, Ivory Coast, Ghana)
- Cymothoe herminia johnstoni (Butler, 1902) (Uganda, western Kenya, western Tanzania)
- Cymothoe herminia katshokwe Overlaet, 1940 (southern Democratic Republic of the Congo, Zambia)

Torben Larsen developed a species numbering system for his 2005 publication Butterflies of West Africa. The subspecies gongoa is #859. The 'Larsen' numbers have since been used with permission in A Sharp Eye on Butterflies of Ghana.

== Gallery ==
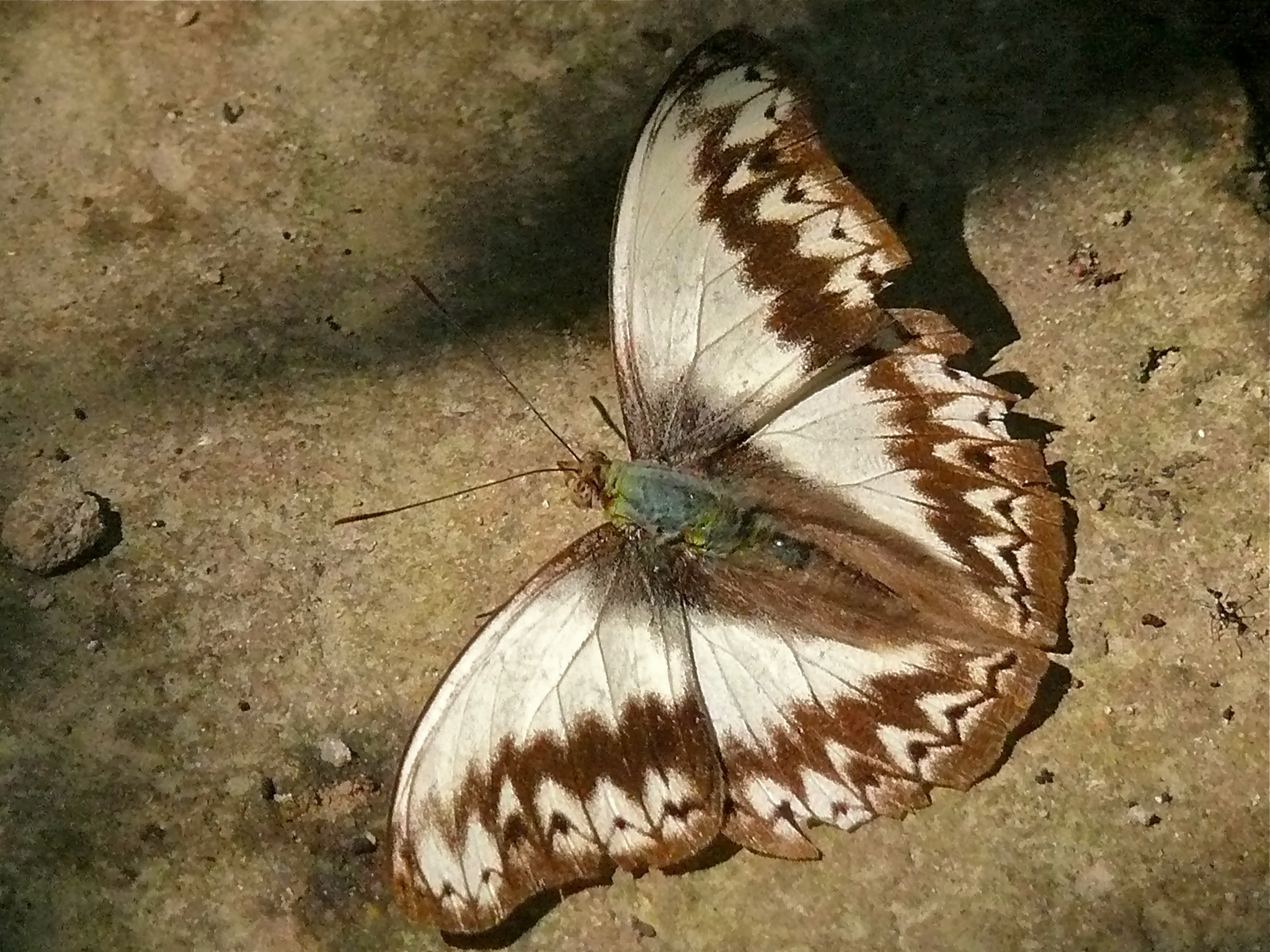
Kibale Forest, Uganda
