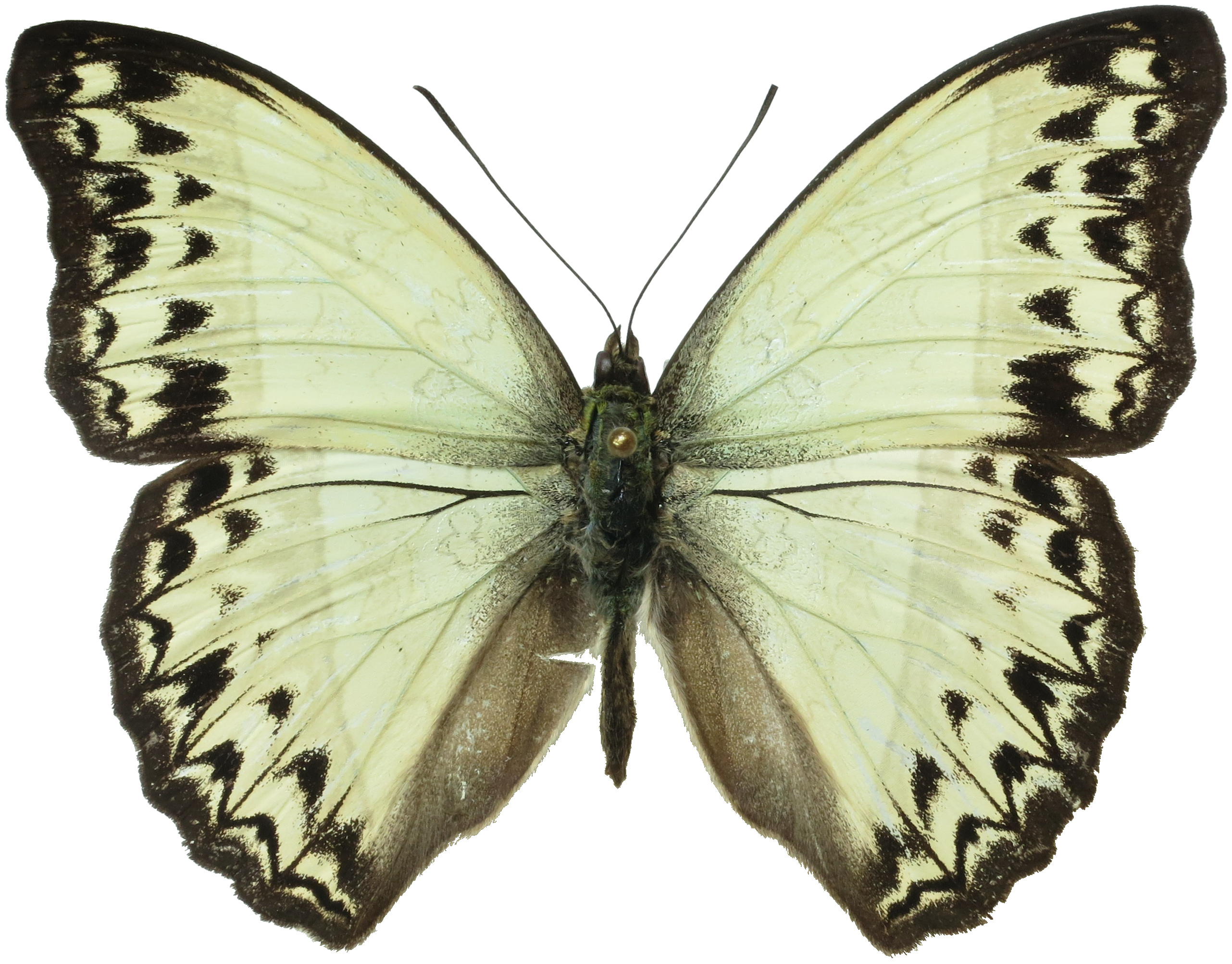
- Male, Mbalmayo, Cameroon
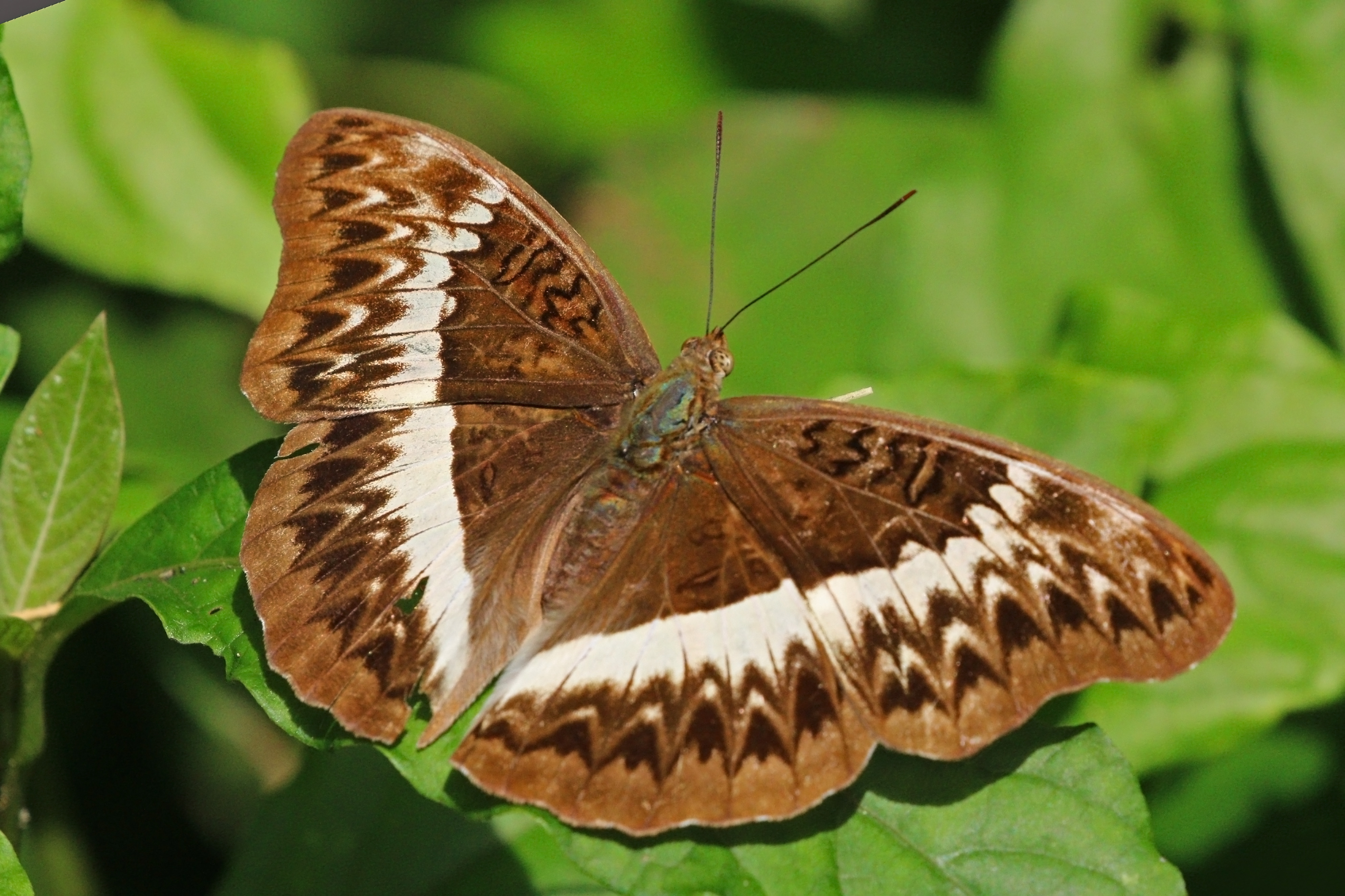
- Female, Kibale National Park, Uganda

Conservation status
- Least Concern (IUCN 3.1)

Scientific classification
- Kingdom: Animalia
- Phylum: Arthropoda
- Clade: Pancrustacea
- Class: Insecta
- Order: Lepidoptera
- Family: Nymphalidae
- Genus: Cymothoe
- Species: C. caenis

Binomial name
- Cymothoe caenis (Drury, [1773])

Synonyms
- Papilio caenis Drury, 1773; Harma adelina Hewitson, 1869; Cymothoe adelina; Harma corsandra Druce, 1874; Cymothoe caenis ab. conformis Aurivillius, 1898; Cymothoe caenis ab. dumensis Strand, 1910; Cymothoe caenis ab. bakossensis Strand, 1912; Cymothoe caenis ab. luteostriata Strand, 1914; Cymothoe caenis ab. diffusa Schultze, 1916; Cymothoe caenis ab. obscura Schultze, 1920; Cymothoe caenis ab. variegata Schultze, 1920; Cymothoe caenis ab. lutea Schultze, 1920; Cymothoe caenis f. rubida Holland, 1920; Cymothoe caenis f. crassa Overlaet, 1942; Cymothoe caenis f. maynei Overlaet, 1942; Cymothoe caenis ab. uniformis Overlaet, 1952; Cymothoe caenis ab. styx Overlaet, 1952; Cymothoe caenis ab. schultzei Overlaet, 1952; Cymothoe caenis ab. ferruginea Dufrane, 1953

= Cymothoe caenis =

Species of butterfly

Cymothoe caenis, the common glider, is a species of butterfly of the family Nymphalidae. It is found in Guinea, Sierra Leone, Liberia, Ivory Coast, Ghana, Togo, southern Nigeria, Cameroon, the Republic of the Congo, the Central African Republic, Angola, the Democratic Republic of the Congo, Uganda, Tanzania and Zambia. The habitat consists of forests and heavy woodland. It is a migratory species.

The larvae feed on Rawsonia usambarensis, Rawsonia lucida, Caloncoba gilgiana, Caloncoba glauca, Oncoba spinosa, Oncoba welwitschii, Lindackeria and Uapaca species.

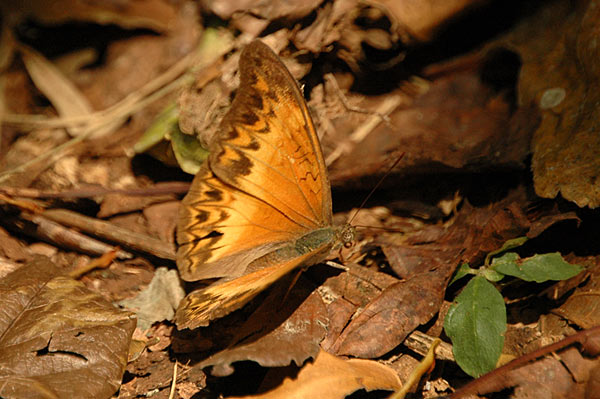

Torben Larsen developed a species numbering system for his 2005 publication Butterflies of West Africa. The species Cymothoe caenis was #863. The species in Ghana is now assigned to Cymothoe druryi. Male and female, both upper and underside, are illustrated in A Sharp Eye on Butterflies of Ghana.
