= O. ovalis =

O. ovalis may refer to:

- Oenopota ovalis, a sea snail species
- Oncoba ovalis, a plant species found in Cameroon and Nigeria

== See also ==
- Ovalis (disambiguation)
