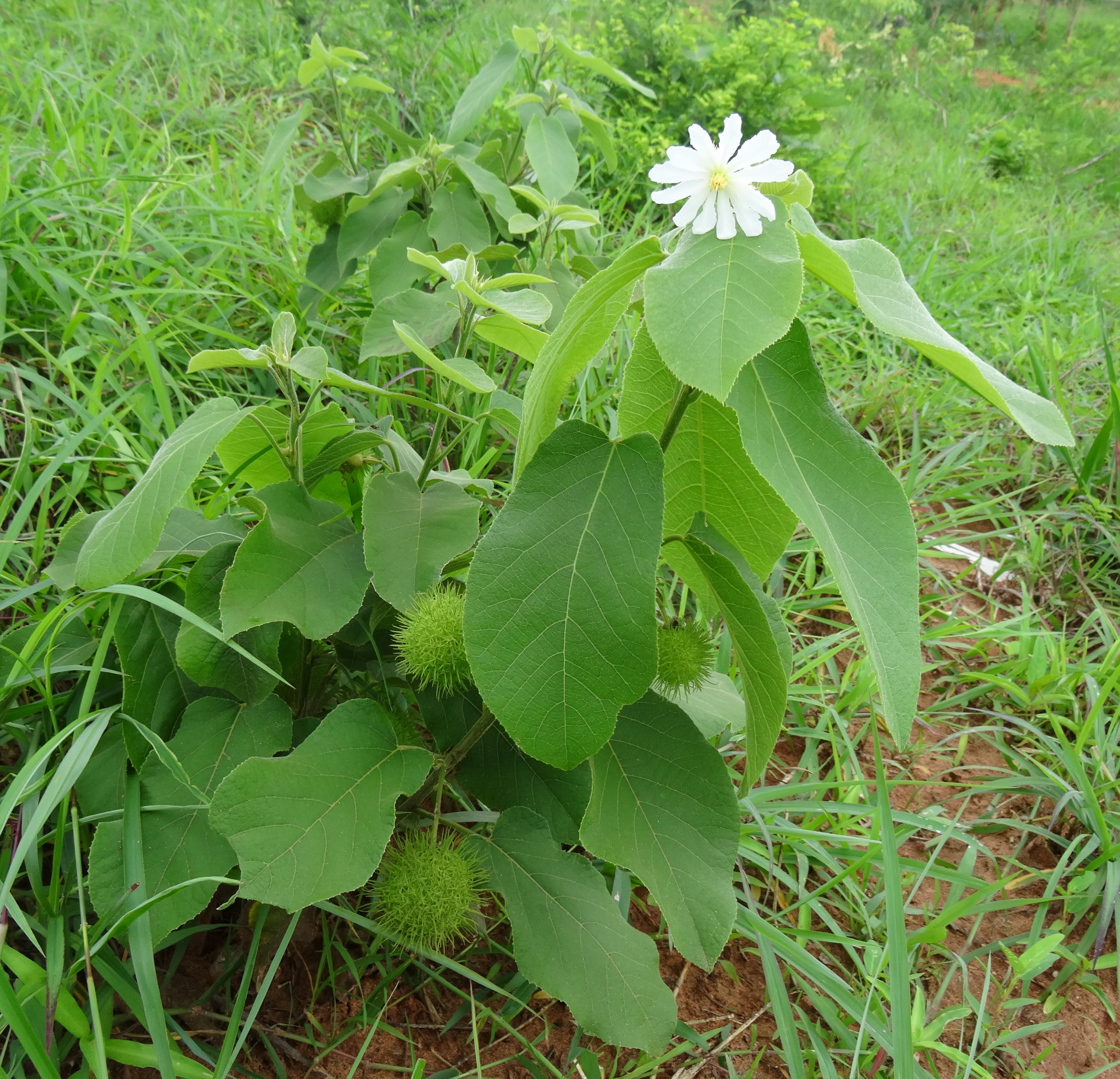

Conservation status
- Least Concern (IUCN 3.1)

Scientific classification
- Kingdom: Plantae
- Clade: Tracheophytes
- Clade: Angiosperms
- Clade: Eudicots
- Clade: Rosids
- Order: Malpighiales
- Family: Achariaceae
- Genus: Buchnerodendron
- Species: B. lasiocalyx

Binomial name
- Buchnerodendron lasiocalyx (Oliv.) Gilg

= Buchnerodendron lasiocalyx =

Species of plant

Buchnerodendron lasiocalyx is a species of plant in the Achariaceae family. It is native to both Mozambique and Tanzania.
