= A. ovalis =

A. ovalis may refer to:

- Alopecosa ovalis, a wolf spider species found in Inner Mongolia in the People's Republic of China
- Amelanchier ovalis, the snowy mespilus, a shrub species
- Anadara ovalis, the blood ark clam, a clam species found along the Atlantic coast of North America, ranging from Massachusetts to the West Indies and Brazil
- Ancilla ovalis, a sea snail species

== See also ==
- Ovalis (disambiguation)
