= Rawsonia burtt-davyi =

Conservation status
- Vulnerable (IUCN 2.3)

Scientific classification
- Kingdom: Plantae
- Clade: Tracheophytes
- Clade: Angiosperms
- Clade: Eudicots
- Clade: Rosids
- Order: Malpighiales
- Family: Achariaceae
- Genus: Rawsonia
- Species: R. burtt-davyi

Binomial name
- Rawsonia burtt-davyi (Edlin) F.White

Species of flowering plant

Rawsonia burtt-davyi is a species of plant in the Achariaceae family. It is endemic to Mount Mulanje in Malawi.

== Literature ==
- Dowsett-Lemaire, F. & White, F. (1990). New and noteworthy plants from the evergreen forests of Malawi Bull. Jard. Bot. Nat. Belg. 60(1/2) Pages 89 - 95. (Includes a picture).
- Strugnell, A.M. (2002). Endemics of Mt. Mulanje. The endemic spermatophytes of Mt. Mulanje, Malawi Systematics and Geography of Plants 72 Page 17.
- Strugnell, A.M. (2006). A Checklist of the Spermatophytes of Mount Mulanje, Malawi Scripta Botanica Belgica 34 National Botanic Garden of Belgium Page 105.
- Wild, H. (1960). Flacourtiaceae Flora Zambesiaca 1(1) Pages 263 - 265. As Dasylepis burtt-davyi (Includes a picture).
