= Cyperus juncelliformis =

Scientific classification
- Kingdom: Plantae
- Clade: Tracheophytes
- Clade: Angiosperms
- Clade: Monocots
- Clade: Commelinids
- Order: Poales
- Family: Cyperaceae
- Genus: Cyperus
- Species: C. juncelliformis

Binomial name
- Cyperus juncelliformis (Peter) Kük., 1936

Species of sedge

Cyperus juncelliformis is a species of sedge that is native to parts of Tanzania. It was discovered by Albert Peter and Georg Kükenthal.

== See also ==
- List of Cyperus species
