= Ryparosa fasciculata =

Conservation status
- Vulnerable (IUCN 2.3)

Scientific classification
- Kingdom: Plantae
- Clade: Tracheophytes
- Clade: Angiosperms
- Clade: Eudicots
- Clade: Rosids
- Order: Malpighiales
- Family: Achariaceae
- Genus: Ryparosa
- Species: R. fasciculata

Binomial name
- Ryparosa fasciculata King

Synonyms
- Ryparosa inconstans Craib; Ryparosa scortechinii King

Species of tree

Ryparosa fasciculata is a species of plant in the family Achariaceae. It is a tree endemic to Peninsular Malaysia. It is threatened by habitat loss.
