= Dasylepis =

Dasylepis may refer to:

- Dasylepis (plant), a genus of flowering plants in the family Achariaceae
- Dasylepis (fish), a fossil genus of fishes in the family Thelodontidae
- Dasylepis, a genus of annelids in the family Polynoidae; synonym of Harmothoe
