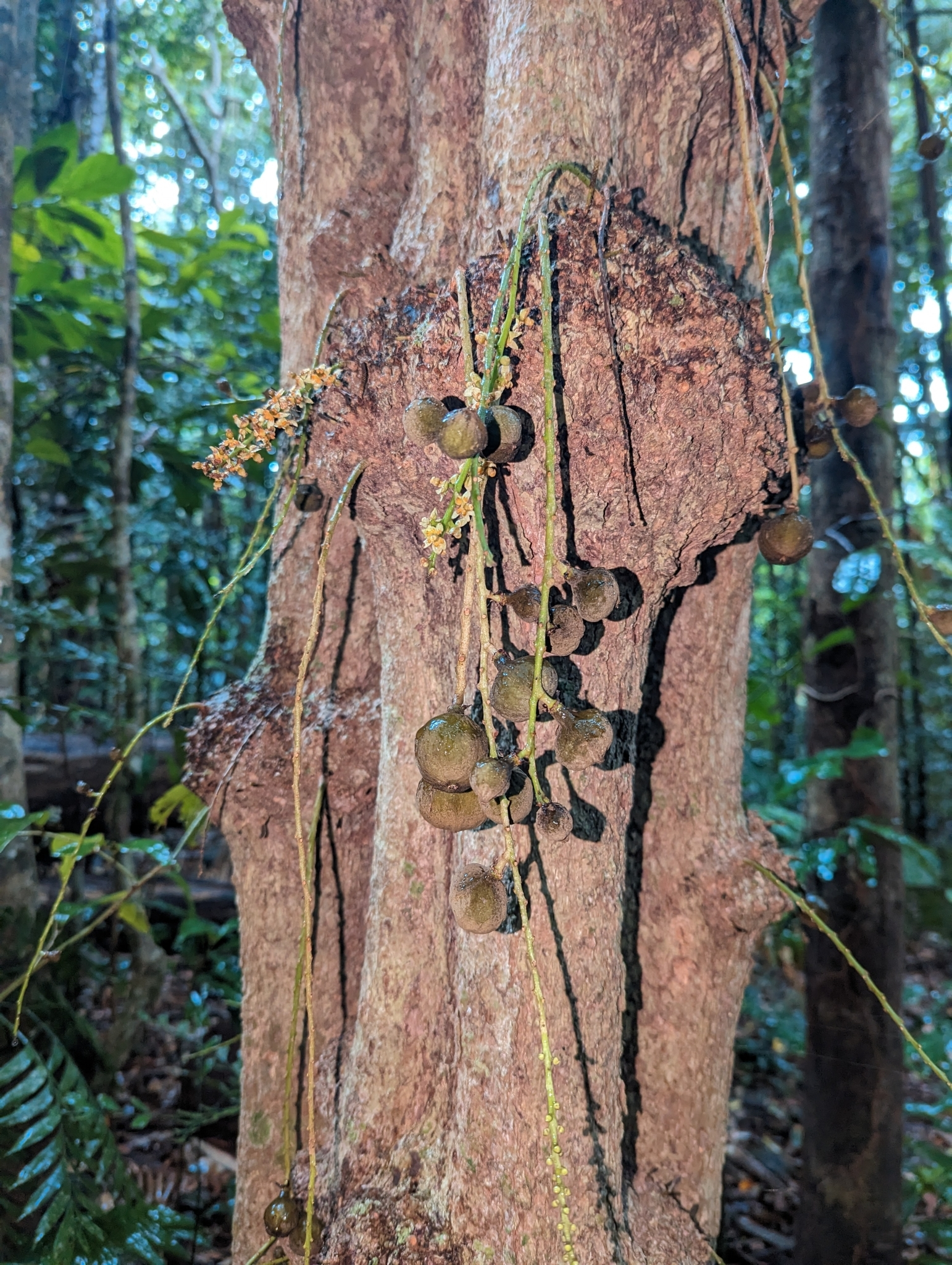
- Flowers and fruit

Conservation status
- Near Threatened (NCA)

Scientific classification
- Kingdom: Plantae
- Clade: Tracheophytes
- Clade: Angiosperms
- Clade: Eudicots
- Clade: Rosids
- Order: Malpighiales
- Family: Achariaceae
- Genus: Ryparosa
- Species: R. kurrangii

Binomial name
- Ryparosa kurrangii B.L.Webber
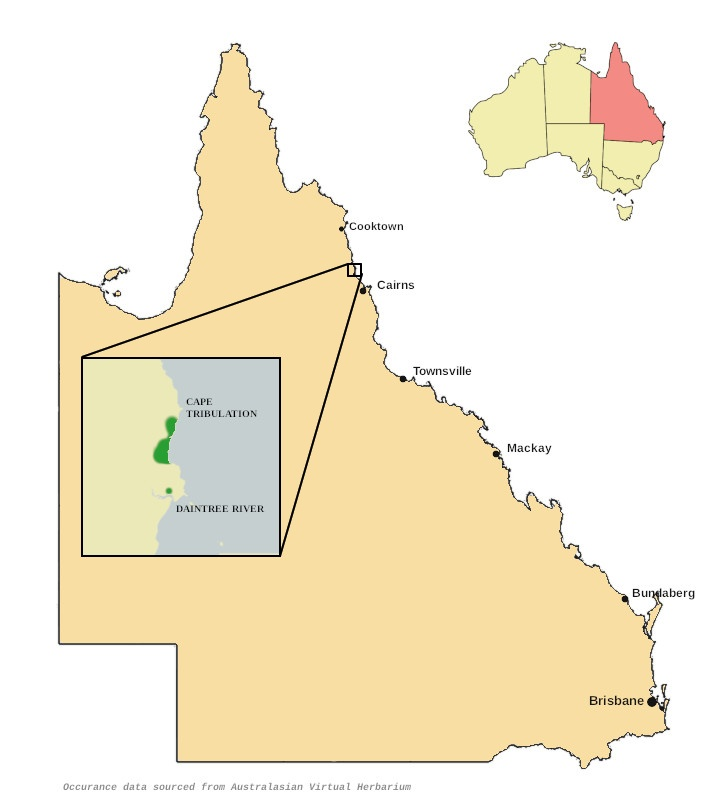

= Ryparosa kurrangii =

Species of flowering plant

Ryparosa kurrangii is a rare plant in the family Achariaceae which is endemic to a very small part of the Queensland tropical rain forests. It is a small tree growing under the rainforest canopy, producing its flowers and fruit on the lower part of the trunk. It was previously considered to be a form of the Ryparosa javanica complex of species.

== Description ==
Ryparosa kurrangii is a small evergreen tree which commonly grows to be 15–20 m tall – larger specimens often develop fluted trunks and buttress roots. The trunk has large irregularly shaped outgrowths (or tubercles) from which flowers and fruit are produced. The elliptic leaves are glossy above and sparsely hairy below, and usually measure from 24 to 28 cm long and from 6 to 7.5 cm wide. They have a well defined acuminate tip (commonly called a "drip tip"), and the base is attenuate (tapering). There are 7 or 8 (occasionally 9) secondary veins either side of the midrib. The long petiole (leaf stem) measures up to 5 cm long.

This species is monoecious, meaning that male and female flowers are borne on the same plant – however the individual inflorescences carry either only staminate (functionally male) flowers or only pistillate (functionally female) flowers. The inflorescences are fascicles, the males ones measuring up to 40 cm long and the female ones up to 35 cm long. They are produced from the turbercles on the lower trunk, or very rarely from branches. The flowers are quite small, with 4 or 5 petals measuring up to 5 mm long by 2.5 mm wide, and have a sickly sweet fragrance.

The fruit are indehiscent, globose drupes, and vary in shape depending on the number of seeds contained within. They have a dense covering of dark hairs and are dark green when immature, becoming yellow/orange when ripe.

=== Phenology ===
Flowering occurs from June to September, with fruit maturing around October to December.

== Taxonomy ==
This species was first discovered in the Daintree area the 1960s. At the time, it was considered to be an outlier population of Ryparosa javanica, which at the time had become a complex of poorly known species ranging from the Andaman Islands through the whole of Malesia to Queensland. In 2006 the Australian botanist Bruce L. Webber published a paper in which he reviewed the R. javanica complex, and R. kurrangii is one of several new species that he created.

=== Etymology ===
The genus name Ryparosa is derived from the Ancient Greek work ῥῠ́πος (rhúpos) meaning dirt or filth, and refers to the dark hairs. The species epithet kurrangii is from the local indigenous Kuku Yalanji word for Cape Tribulation, kurrangi.

== Distribution and habitat ==
Ryparosa kurrangii grows as an understory tree in well developed rainforest. It is endemic to Queensland, Australia, and restricted to an extremely small area, i.e. the coastal strip between the Daintree River in the south and Cape Tribulation in the north, and bounded by the Coral Sea to the east and the Great Dividing Range in the west. The total area of occupancy of this species is just 64 km^{2} (25 sq mi).

== Ecology ==
The fruit of this species is eaten by cassowaries (Casuarius casuarius) and the seeds are later deposited in the bird's droppings. It has been shown that after passing through the bird's gut, the germination rate of the seeds increases remarkably from 4% to 92%.

== Conservation ==
This species is listed by the Queensland Department of Environment and Science as near threatened. As of 16 October 2023, it has not been assessed by the International Union for Conservation of Nature (IUCN).

== Gallery ==
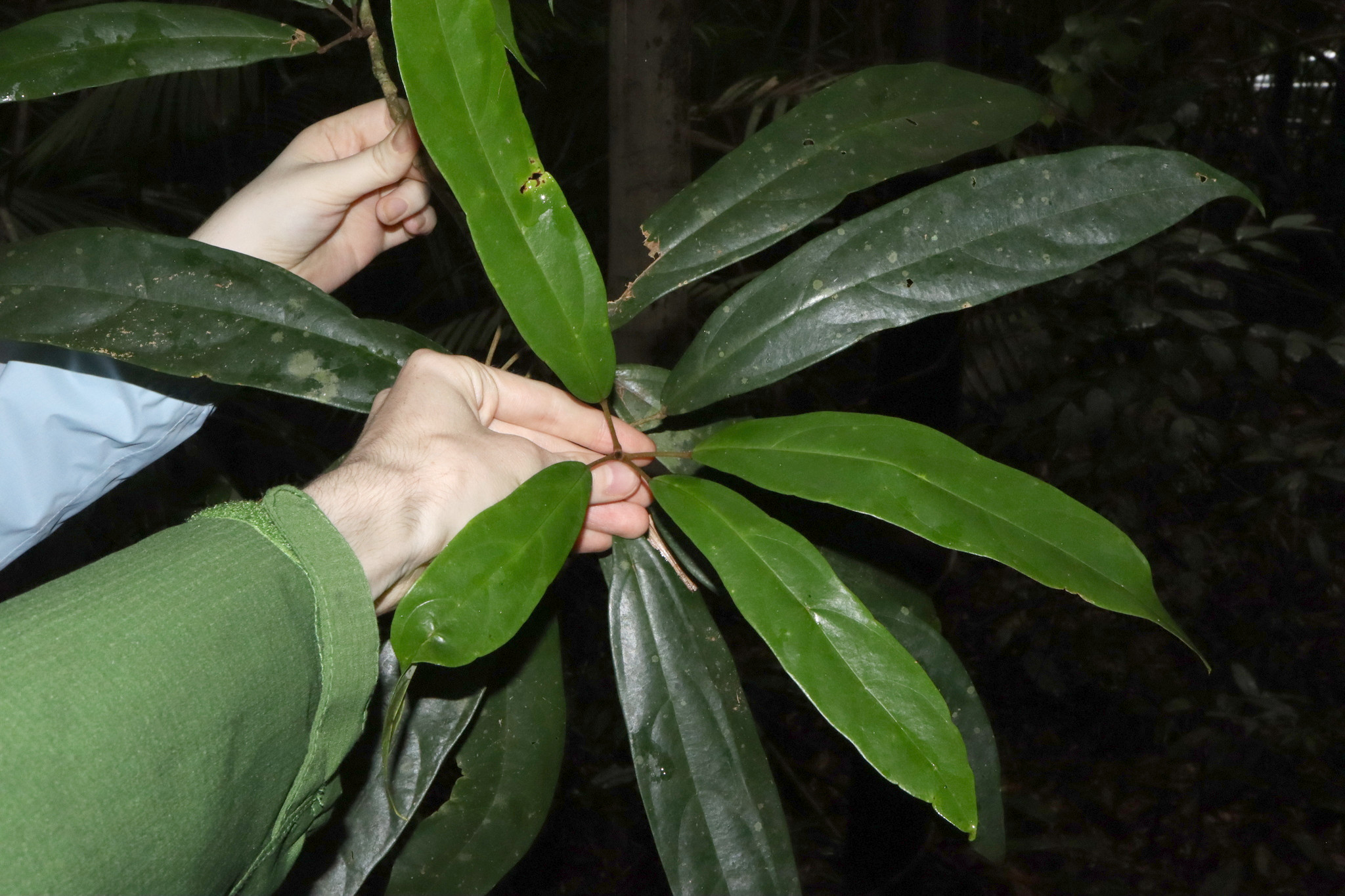
Foliage

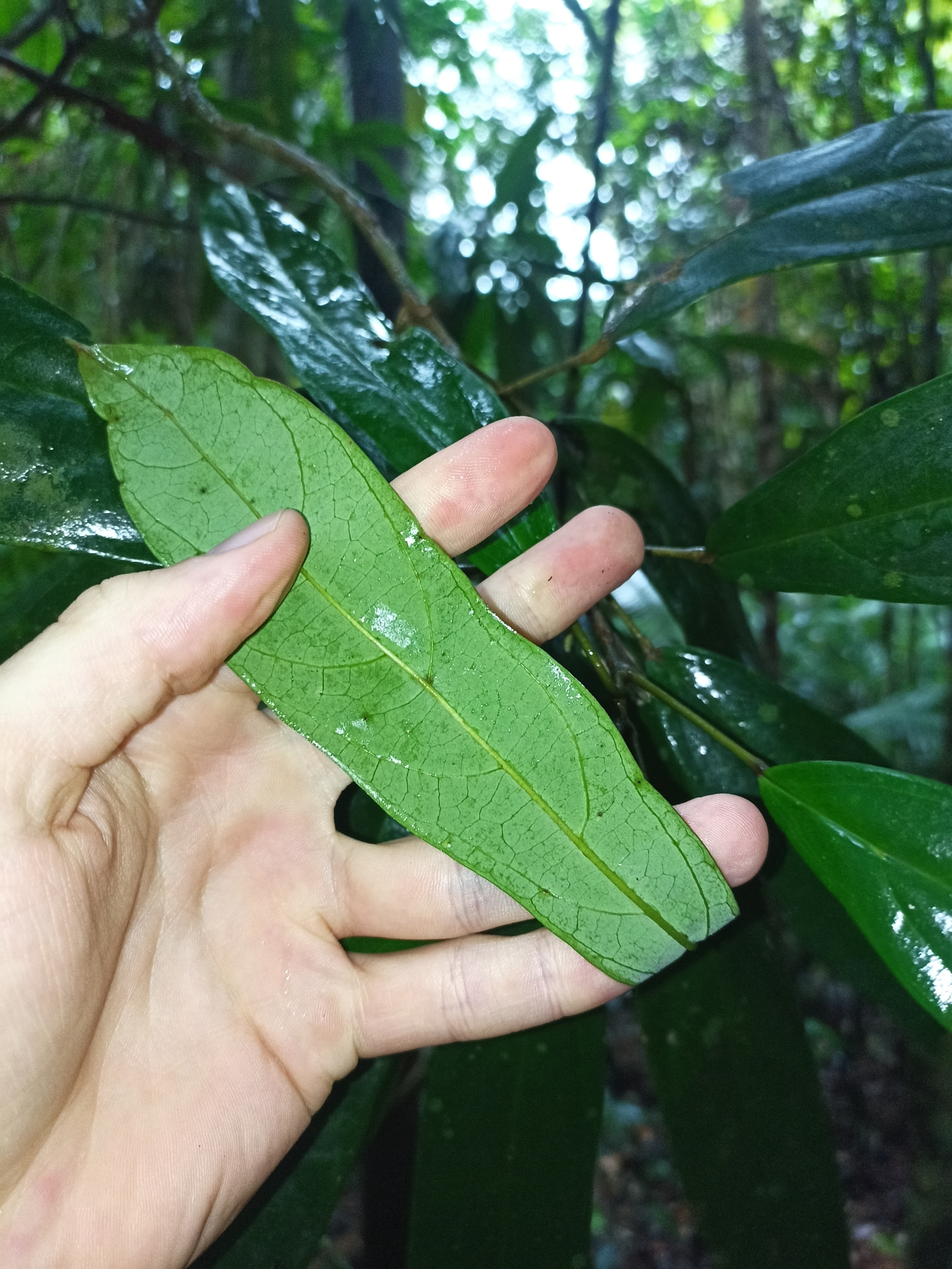
Leaf underside

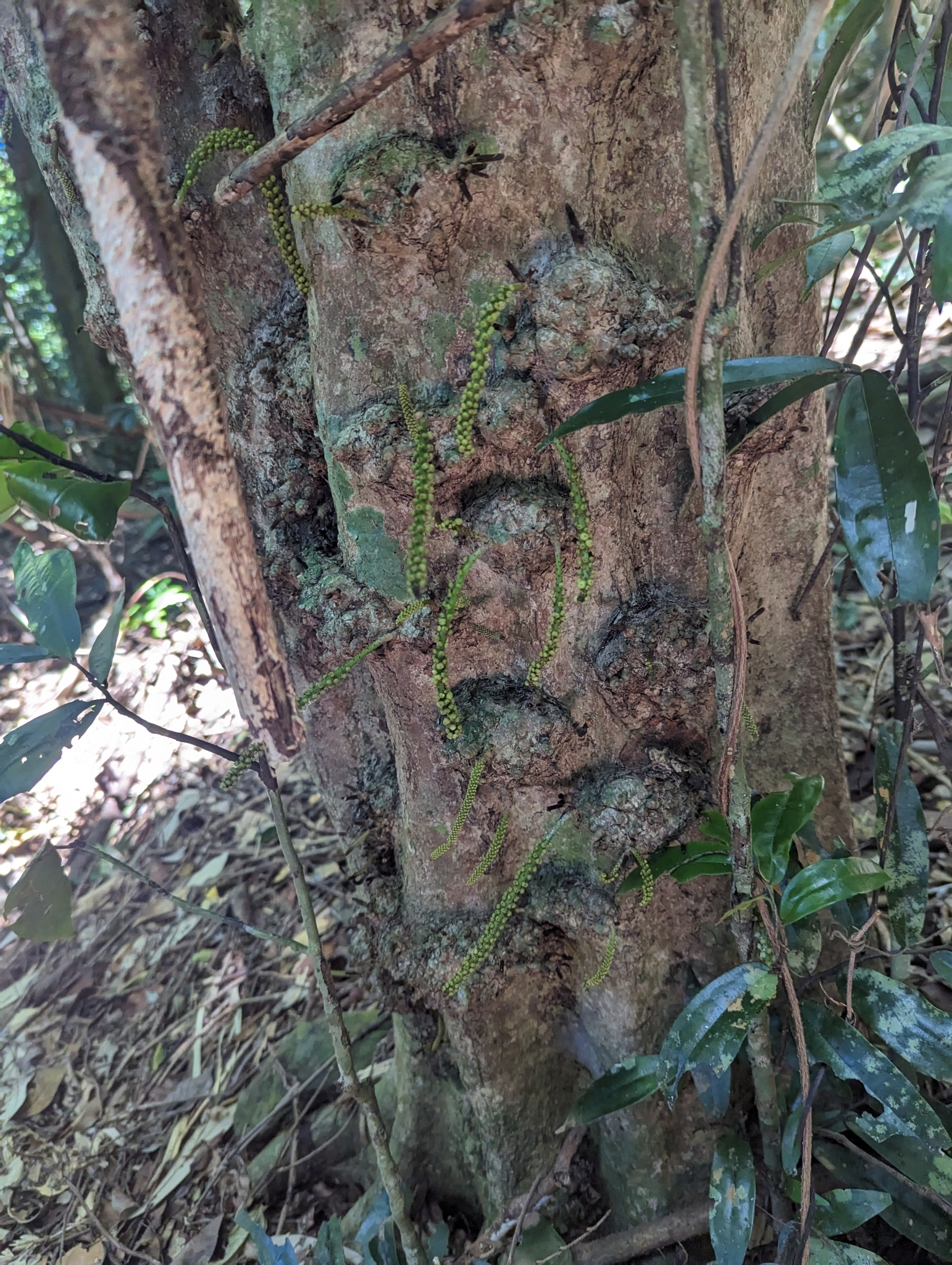
Flower budding

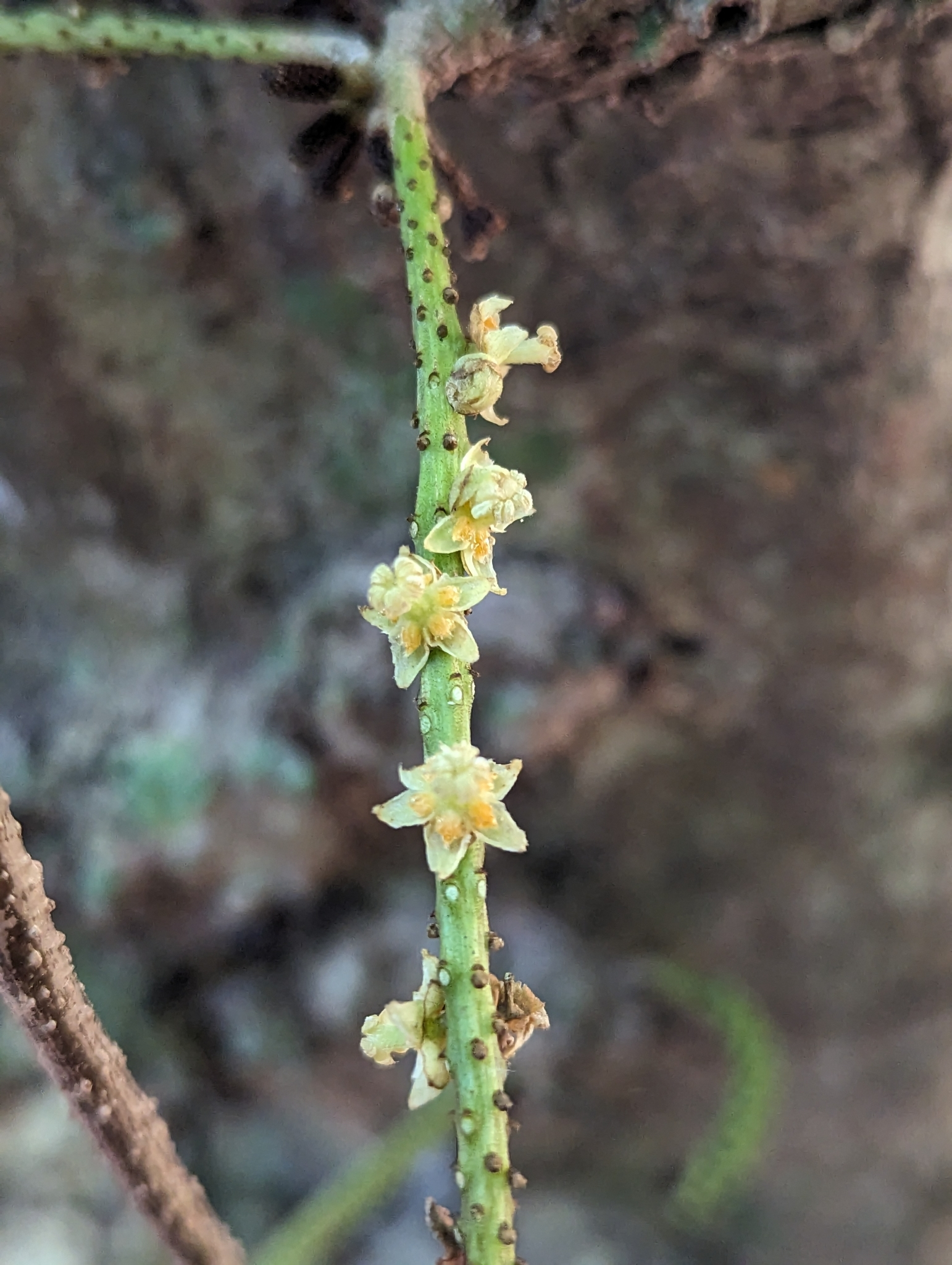
Flowers

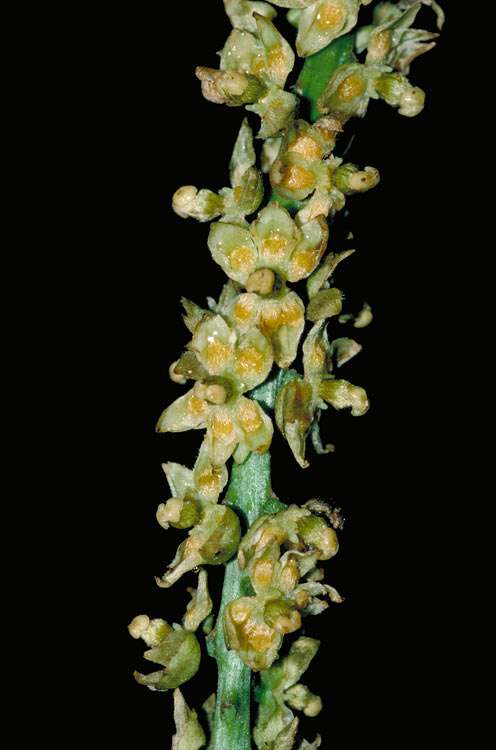
Female inflorescence
