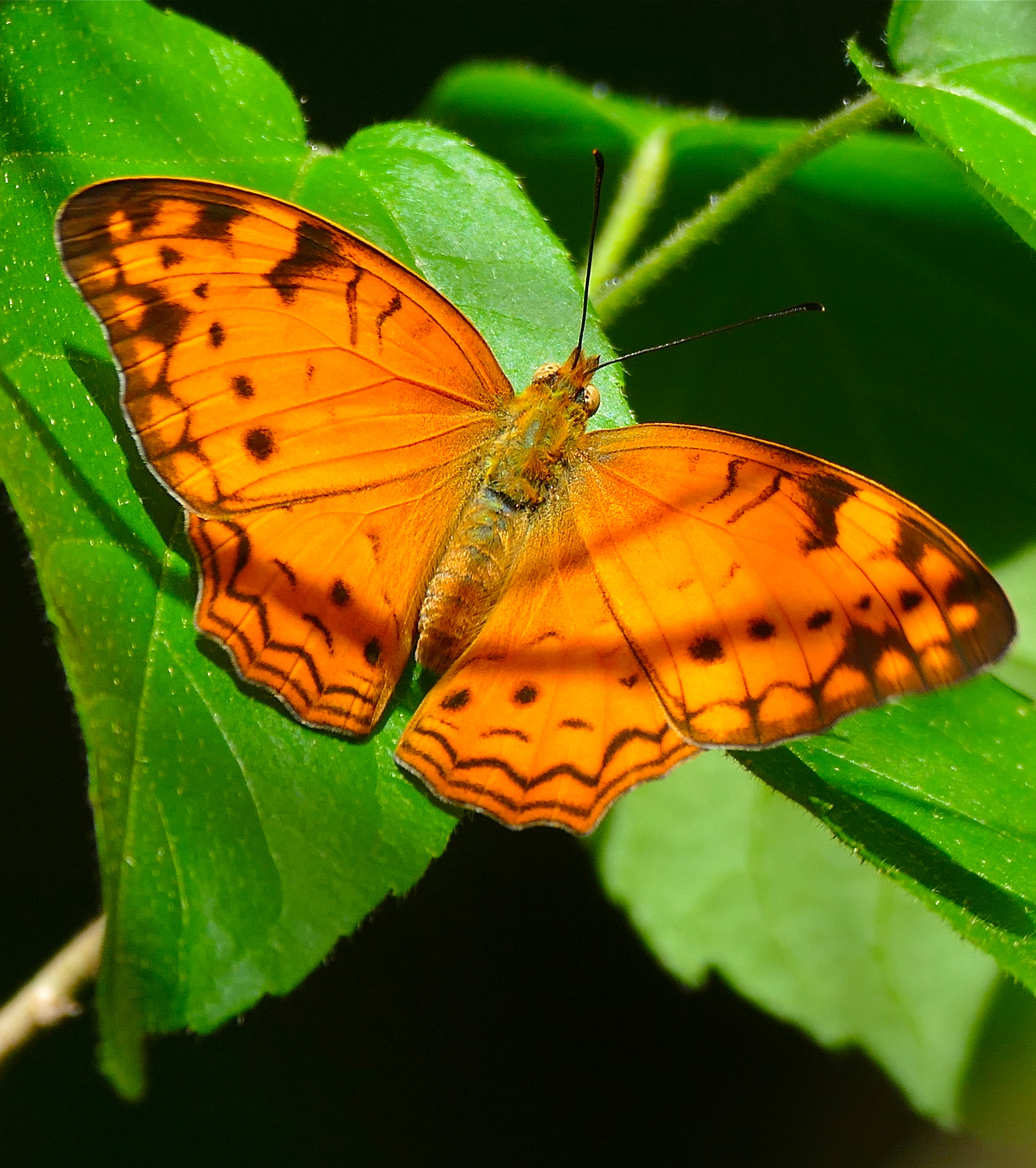

Scientific classification
- Domain: Eukaryota
- Kingdom: Animalia
- Phylum: Arthropoda
- Class: Insecta
- Order: Lepidoptera
- Family: Nymphalidae
- Genus: Lachnoptera
- Species: L. ayresii

Binomial name
- Lachnoptera ayresii Trimen, 1879

Synonyms
- Lachnoptera ayresii var. abbottii Holland, 1896

= Lachnoptera ayresii =

Species of butterfly

Lachnoptera ayresii, the eastern blotched leopard, is a butterfly of the family Nymphalidae. It is found in Afromontane and riverine forest from Port St. Johns in the Eastern Cape and then along the escarpment to the midlands of KwaZulu-Natal, Eswatini, Mpumalanga and the Wolkberg in Limpopo, north to Zimbabwe and Mozambique.

The wingspan is 45–52 mm for males and 50–56 mm for females. Adults are on wing year round with a peak in late summer and autumn, from January to June.

The larvae feed on Rawsonia lucida and Vismia species.
