= Mayna pubescens =

Conservation status
- Endangered (IUCN 3.1)

Scientific classification
- Kingdom: Plantae
- Clade: Tracheophytes
- Clade: Angiosperms
- Clade: Eudicots
- Clade: Rosids
- Order: Malpighiales
- Family: Achariaceae
- Genus: Mayna
- Species: M. pubescens

Binomial name
- Mayna pubescens (H.Karst. & Triana) Warb.

Synonyms
- Dendrostylis pubescens H.Karst. & Triana

Species of plant

Mayna pubescens is a species of flowering plant in the family Achariaceae. It is endemic to Colombia.
