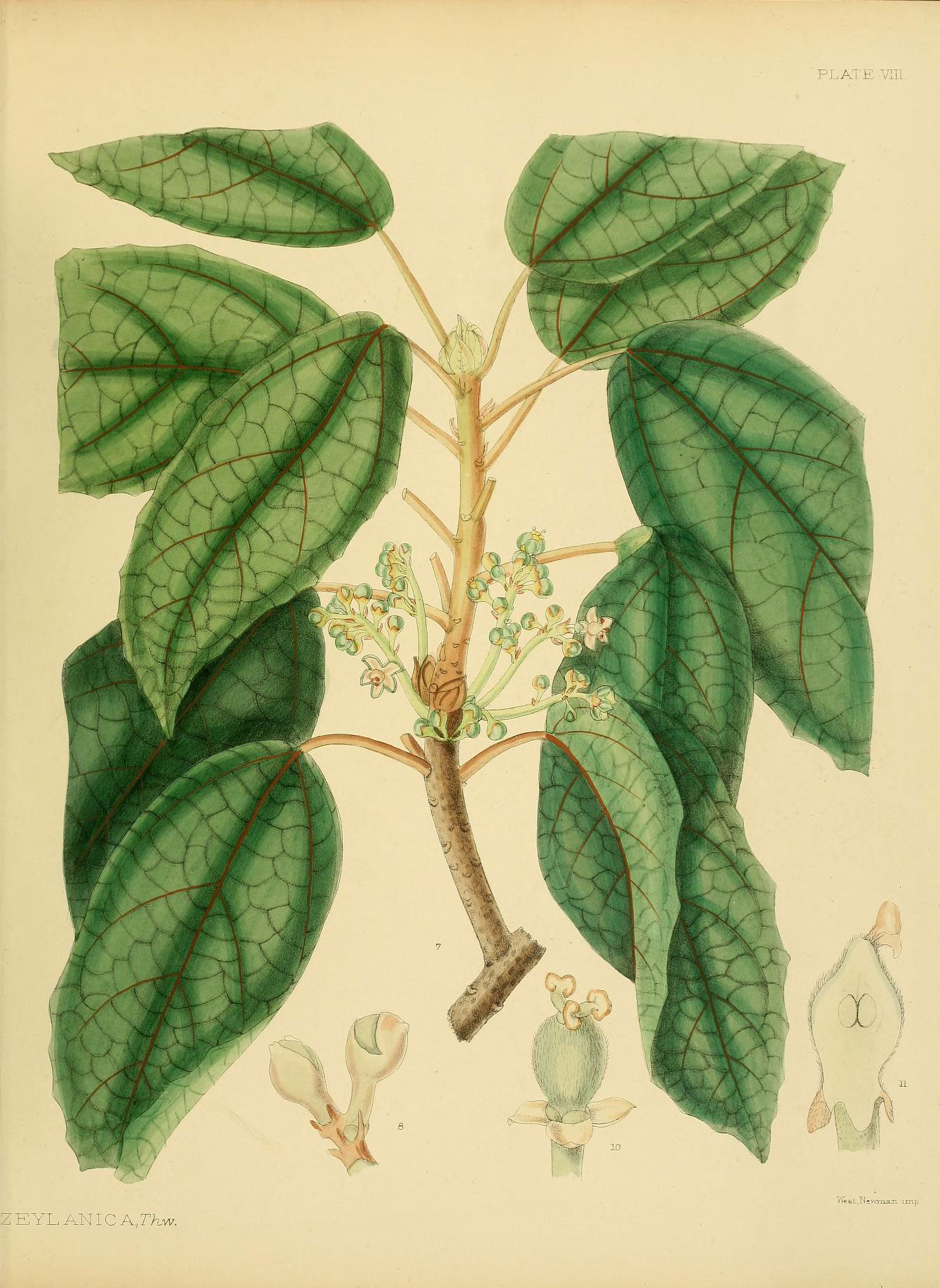

Conservation status
- Vulnerable (IUCN 2.3)

Scientific classification
- Kingdom: Plantae
- Clade: Tracheophytes
- Clade: Angiosperms
- Clade: Eudicots
- Clade: Rosids
- Order: Malpighiales
- Family: Achariaceae
- Genus: Trichadenia
- Species: T. zeylanica

Binomial name
- Trichadenia zeylanica Thwaites

= Trichadenia zeylanica =

Species of flowering plant

Trichadenia zeylanica is a species of plant in the Achariaceae family. It is endemic to Sri Lanka.
