= Lachnoptera anticlia =

- male in Uganda

Scientific classification
- Kingdom: Animalia
- Phylum: Arthropoda
- Clade: Pancrustacea
- Class: Insecta
- Order: Lepidoptera
- Family: Nymphalidae
- Genus: Lachnoptera
- Species: L. anticlia

Binomial name
- Lachnoptera anticlia (Hübner, 1819)

Synonyms
- Issoria anticlia Hübner, 1819; Papilio laodice Cramer, 1777; Papilio iole Fabricius, 1781; Harma hecatea Hewitson, 1877; Lachnoptera iole var. afzelii Aurivillius, 1887; Lachnoptera iole f. androchroma Bryk, 1913; Lachnoptera ayresi ab. pallens Dufrane, 1945

Species of butterfly

Lachnoptera anticlia, the western blotched leopard, is a butterfly in the family Nymphalidae. It is found in Senegal, Guinea, Sierra Leone, Liberia, Ivory Coast, Ghana, Togo, Nigeria, Cameroon, Equatorial Guinea, Gabon, the Republic of the Congo, the Central African Republic, Angola, the Democratic Republic of the Congo, southern Sudan, Uganda, western Kenya, north-western Tanzania and north-western Zambia. The habitat consists of forests and forest margins.

The larvae feed on Rawsonia lucida and Scotellia chevalieri.

Torben Larsen developed a species numbering system for his 2005 publication Butterflies of West Africa. This species is #1199. The 'Larsen' numbers have since been used with permission in A Sharp Eye on Butterflies of Ghana.
