= Carpotroche caceresiae =

Scientific classification
- Kingdom: Plantae
- Clade: Tracheophytes
- Clade: Angiosperms
- Clade: Eudicots
- Clade: Rosids
- Order: Malpighiales
- Family: Achariaceae
- Genus: Carpotroche
- Species: C. caceresiae

Binomial name
- Carpotroche caceresiae D. Santam (2021)

Species of flowering plant

Carpotroche caceresiae is a species of plant in the genus Carpotroche. C. caceresiae has been collected from very wet undisturbed forest on the Caribbean coast of Honduras and Nicaragua, at elevations of up to 600 m (2,000 ft) although it may exist in other areas of Honduras as well as Guatemala.

C. caceresiae is named in memory of Berta Isabel Cáceres, one of 123 environmental activists assassinated between 2009 and 2016 in retaliation for their opposition to environmental destruction and loss of indigenous land in Honduras.

== Description ==
C. caceresiae has winged, usually cauliflorous fruits that can be green, white, orange, red or any combination thereof.

Diagnostic morphological characters for C. caceresiae stipulate leaves that lack translucent dots or lines and that are usually clustered towards branch tips; petiole including pulvinus at both ends; odoriferous, unisexual, polygamomonoecious or -dioecious flowers with more petals than sepals; numerous stamens, pubescent filaments; a pistil with 4–8 (–10) capitate or lacerated stylodes, and late dehiscent capsular fruits with smooth, vertical or winged ridges.

C. caceresiae is considered a shrub or small tree with smooth brown-gray bark. Leaves are spirally arranged. Young branches are pubescent with brown trichomes. Leaf margins are usually serrate, base cuneate, and apex acuminate. The plant includes staminate flowers that are white when fresh as well as hermaphrodite flowers that are also white. C. caceresiae also bears fruit that is longitudinally winged, yellowish, cream or lime green when fresh. The fresh pulp is orange. The testa of the plant is yellowish to cream when dry.

== Habitat ==
C. caceresiae grows in very wet, undisturbed forests on the Caribbean coast of Honduras and Nicaragua from elevations of up to 600 m (2,000 ft).
