= Peterodendron =

Scientific classification
- Kingdom: Plantae
- Clade: Embryophytes
- Clade: Tracheophytes
- Clade: Angiosperms
- Clade: Eudicots
- Clade: Rosids
- Order: Malpighiales
- Family: Achariaceae
- Genus: Peterodendron; Sleumer
- Species: P. ovatum

Binomial name
- Peterodendron ovatum (Sleumer) Sleumer

Synonyms
- Poggea ovata Sleumer

Genus of flowering plants

Peterodendron is a monotypic genus of flowering plants belonging to the family Achariaceae. The only species is Peterodendron ovatum.

It is native to Tanzania.

The genus name of Peterodendron is in honour of Gustav Albert Peter (1853–1937), a German botanist. The Latin specific epithet of ovatum means egg, it is derived from ovum. It was first described and published in Notizbl. Bot. Gart. Berlin-Dahlem Vol.13 on page 357 in 1936.
