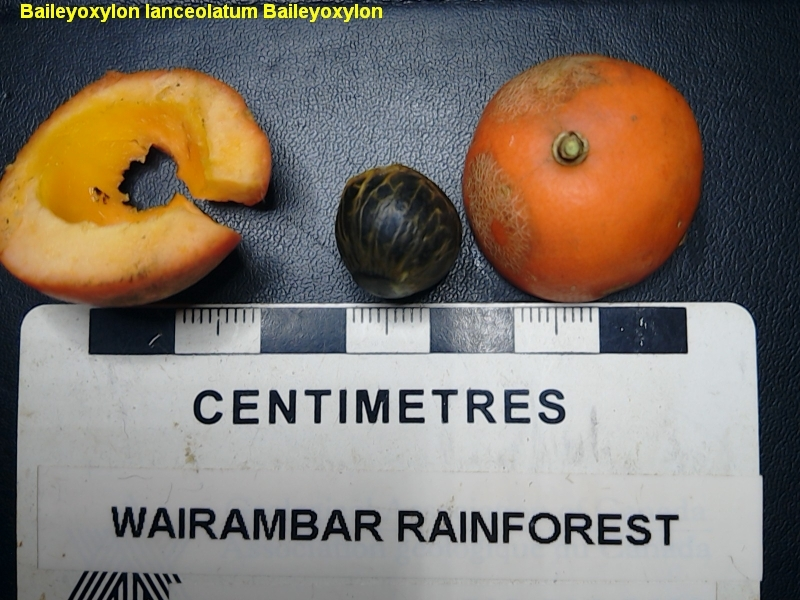
- Fruit and seed

Conservation status
- Least Concern (NCA)

Scientific classification
- Kingdom: Plantae
- Clade: Embryophytes
- Clade: Tracheophytes
- Clade: Angiosperms
- Clade: Eudicots
- Clade: Rosids
- Clade: Fabids
- Order: Malpighiales
- Family: Achariaceae
- Genus: Baileyoxylon; C.T.White
- Species: B. lanceolatum

Binomial name
- Baileyoxylon lanceolatum C.T.White
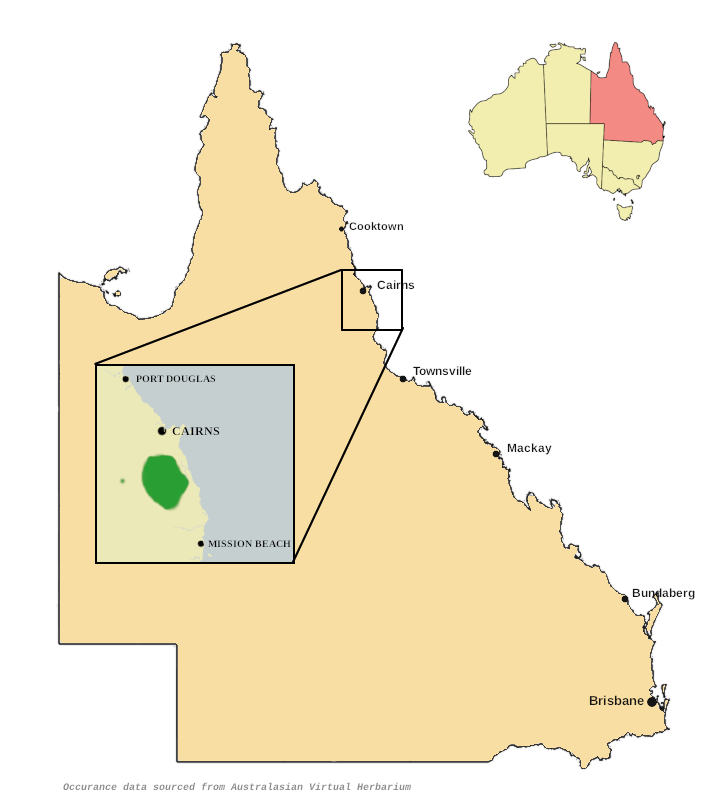

= Baileyoxylon =

Genus of flowering plants

Baileyoxylon is a monotypic genus of flowering plants in the family Achariaceae. The sole described species is Baileyoxylon lanceolatum, which is restricted to a very small part of the Wet Tropics of Queensland. It was described in the mid 20th century.

== Description ==
Baileyoxylon lanceolatum is an evergreen tree growing up to about 25–30 m (82–98 ft) tall with medium grey bark and branchlets that are covered in rusty brown hairs. The dark green leaves are rather thick and measure up to 16 cm (6.3 in) long by 5 cm (2.0 in) wide, with 7–10 pairs of secondary veins either side of the midrib. They are obovate to oblong in shape, acuminate (pointed) at the tip and cuneate (tapering) at the base, and they have a relatively long 2 cm (0.79 in) petiole.

The much-branched inflorescence can reach up to 10 cm (3.9 in) long and is also covered with rusty brown hairs. The small flowers are about 5 mm (0.20 in) long and have 5 petals. The globose orange fruit is, in botanical terminology, a berry containing one or two seeds. It measures around 3 cm (1.2 in) diameter.

== Taxonomy ==
This species was first described in 1940 by Australian botanist Cyril Tenison White, based on material collected by the botanical collector S. F. Kajewski from two individual trees in 1929. White's paper, titled "A new genus of Flacourtiaceae (Pangieae — Hydnocarpinae) from tropical Queensland", was published in the Journal of the Arnold Arboretum in January 1941.

=== Etymology ===
The genus name Baileyoxlon was created by White in honour of the American botanist Irving Widmer Bailey, who provided much assistance to White in identifying the taxonomic placement of this new species.

== Distribution and habitat ==
The natural range of Baileyoxylon lanceolatum is a small area of upland rainforest on the eastern part of the Atherton Tableland, in the vicinity of Mount Bartle Frere. The total area of occupancy is just 116 km^{2} (45 sq mi). The habitat is very wet mesophyll vine forest.

== Conservation ==
This species is listed by the Queensland Government as least concern under its Nature Conservation Act. As of 9 October 2025, it has not been assessed by the International Union for Conservation of Nature (IUCN).

== Gallery ==
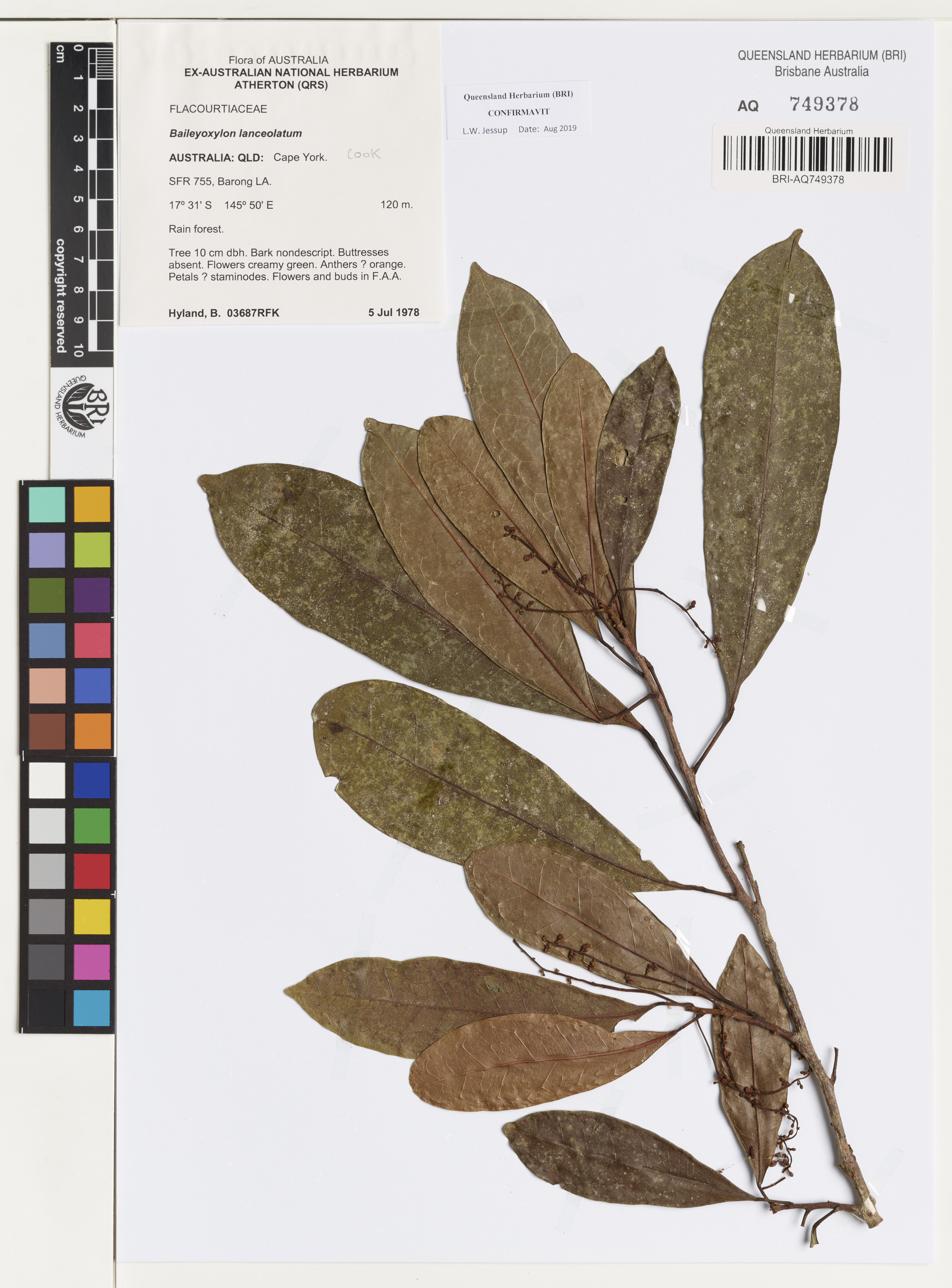
Herbarium sheet

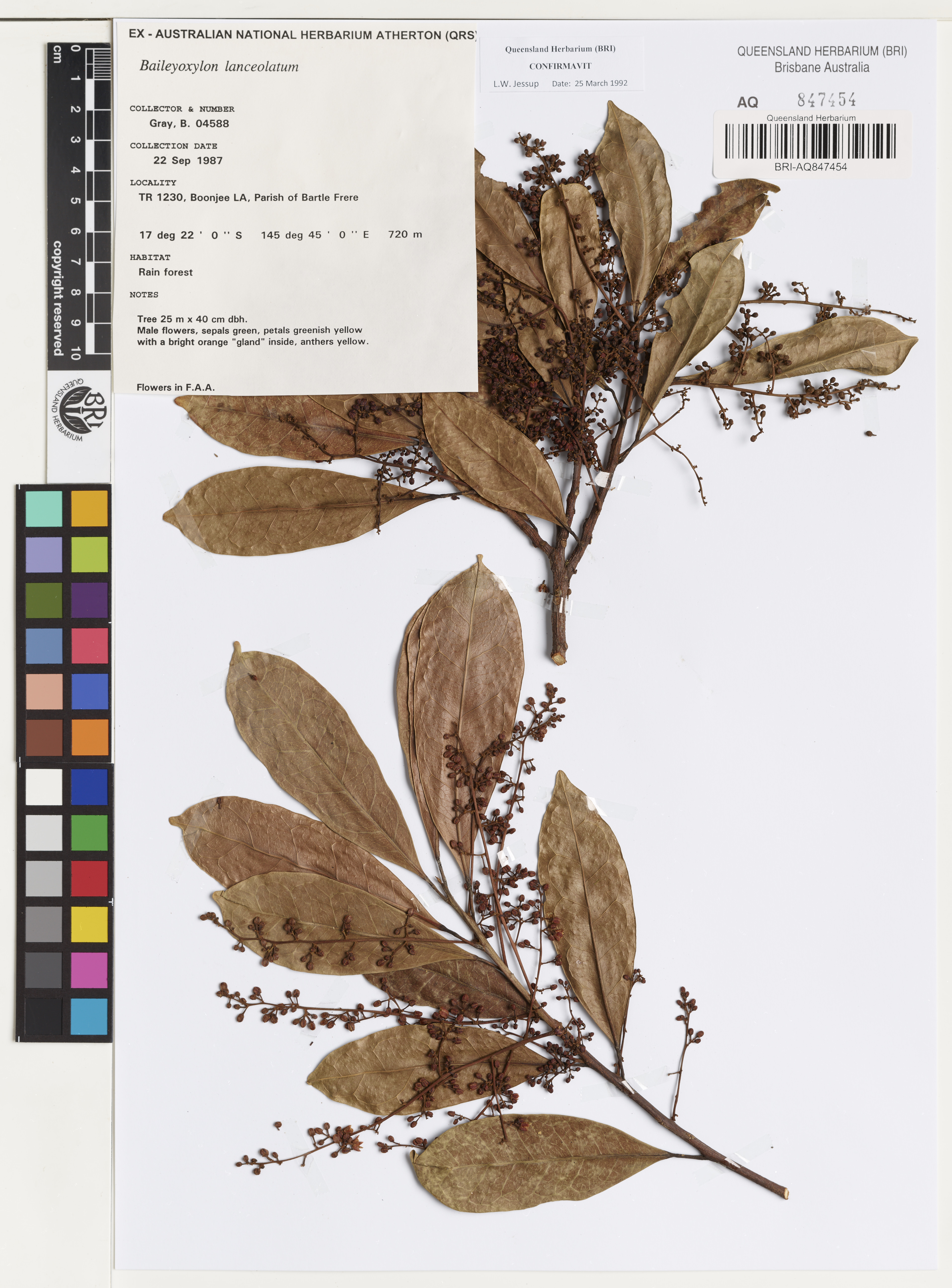
Herbarium sheet
