= Erythrospermum =

Scientific classification
- Kingdom: Plantae
- Clade: Tracheophytes
- Clade: Angiosperms
- Clade: Eudicots
- Clade: Rosids
- Order: Malpighiales
- Family: Achariaceae
- Genus: Erythrospermum; Lam.

Genus of plants

Erythrospermum is a genus of flowering plants belonging to the family Achariaceae.

Its native range is Western Indian Ocean, Sri Lanka, Malesia to Southwestern Pacific.

Species:

- Erythrospermum acuminatissimum (A.Gray) A.C.Sm.
- Erythrospermum ampullaceum Baker
- Erythrospermum boivinianum Baill.
- Erythrospermum candidum (Becc.) Becc.
- Erythrospermum capitatum Baker
- Erythrospermum coffeaefolium Baill.
- Erythrospermum corymbosum Baill.
- Erythrospermum crassipes Baill.
- Erythrospermum laurei Baill.
- Erythrospermum monticola Thouars
- Erythrospermum nossibeense Baill.
- Erythrospermum pervillei Baill.
- Erythrospermum recurvifolium Baker
- Erythrospermum richardianum Baill.
- Erythrospermum rignyanum Baill.
- Erythrospermum sifarii Hul, Labat & O.Pascal
- Erythrospermum sparsiflorum Baker
- Erythrospermum zeylanicum (Gaertn.) Alston
