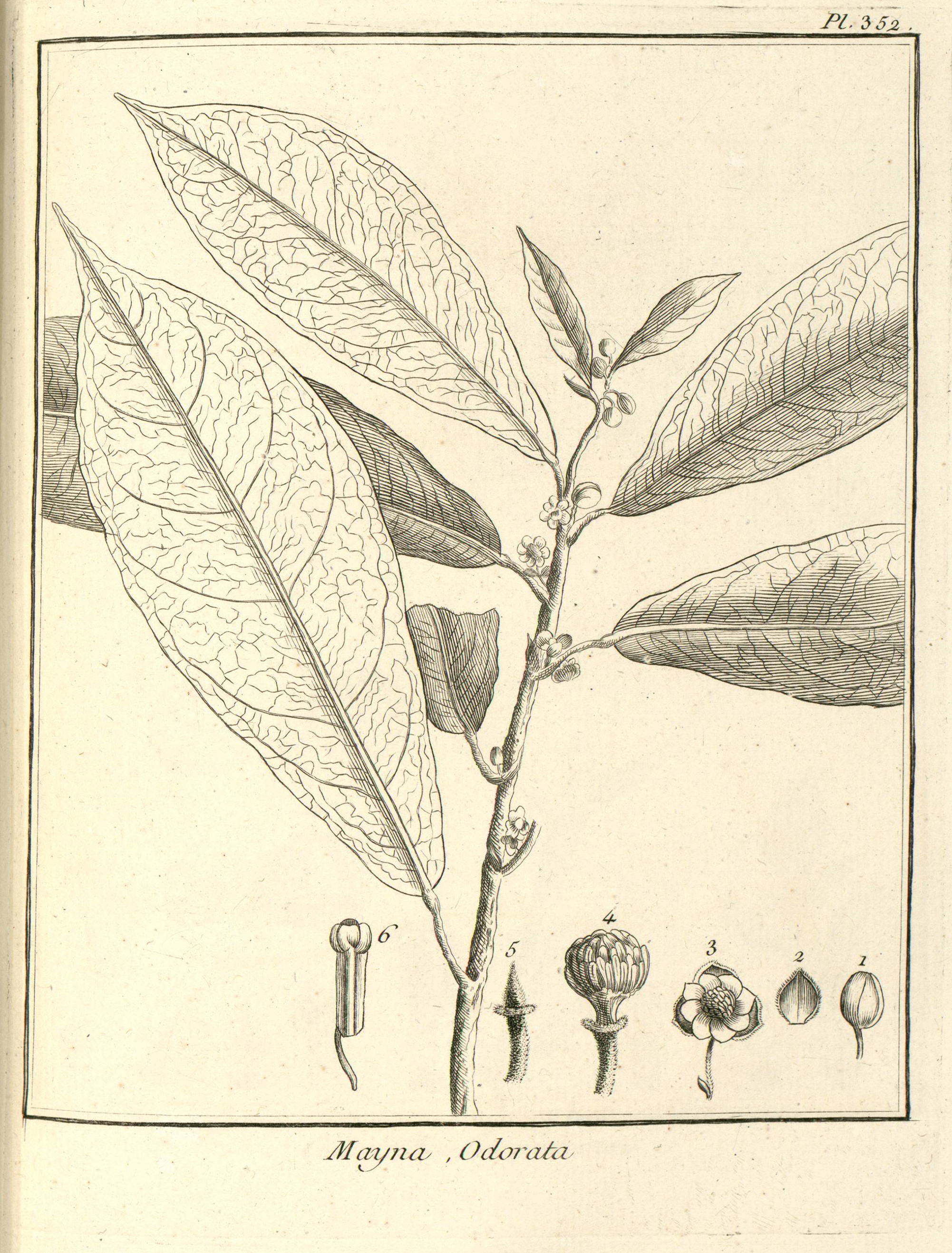
- Scetch of Mayna odorata by Fusée-Aublet in 1775

Scientific classification
- Kingdom: Plantae
- Clade: Tracheophytes
- Clade: Angiosperms
- Clade: Eudicots
- Clade: Rosids
- Order: Malpighiales
- Family: Achariaceae
- Genus: Mayna; Aubl.

Species
- See text

= Mayna (plant) =

Genus of flowering plants

Mayna is a genus of shrubs and trees in the family Achariaceae. It is native to the American tropics. It is dioecious, with male and female flowers produced on separate individuals.

== Taxonomy ==
The following species are currently recognized:

- Mayna grandifolia (H. Karst.) Warb.
- Mayna hystricina (Gleason) Sleumer
- Mayna odorata Aubl.
- Mayna parvifolia (J.F. Macbr.) Sleumer
- Mayna pubescens (Triana & H. Karst.) Warb.
- Mayna suaveolens (Triana & H. Karst.) Warb.
