= Gustav Albert Peter =

German botanist (1853–1937)

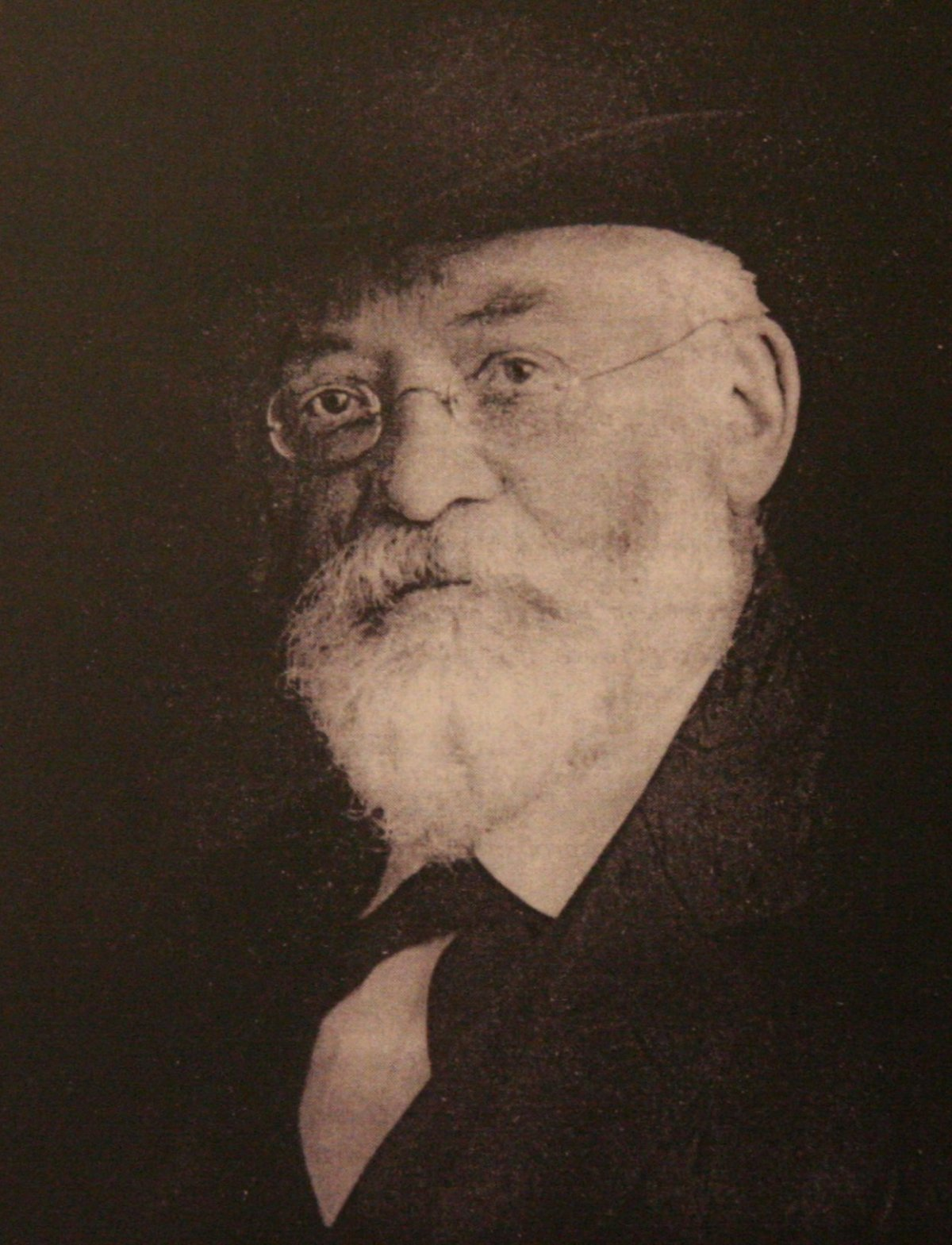
Albert Peter, Göttinger Botaniker, Gründer des Brockengartens

Gustav Albert Peter (21 August 1853, in Gumbinnen – 4 October 1937, in Göttingen) was a German botanist.

In 1874, he received his doctorate at the University of Königsberg, and later on, worked as an assistant to Carl Nägeli at the Ludwig-Maximilians-Universität München, and then as a curator at Alter Botanischer Garten (Munich). In Munich, he edited the well-known exsiccata Hieracia Naegeliana [exsiccata] (1884–1886) with a number of Hieracium specimens from the herbarium of Carl Nägeli, some of them observed and collected at the Alter Botanischer Garten (Munich). From 1888 to 1923, he was a professor at the University of Göttingen, where he also served as director of the botanical garden.

From 1913 until 1919, he collected plants in German South-West Africa, South Africa and especially German East Africa, then later from 1925 to 1926, he was engaged in another botanical expedition in Africa. In 1936, his herbarium of roughly 50,000 plants was acquired by the Berlin-Dahlem Botanical Garden and Botanical Museum. The plant genus Peterodendron (family Achariaceae) was named in his honor by Hermann Otto Sleumer, in 1936.

Peter's daughter Hedwig was married to Leo Rosenberg.

== Published works ==
In the 1890s, he made contributions regarding the plant families Compositae, Convolvulaceae, Hydrophyllaceae and Polemoniaceae to Engler and Prantl's Die Natürlichen Pflanzenfamilien. With Carl Nägeli he published a two-volume work on the genus Hieracium, titled Die Hieracien Mittel-Europas (Hieracium of Central Europe; 1885–89). Other noted works by Peter include:

- Flora von Suedhannover nebst den angrenzenden Gebieten (Göttingen, 1901, 2 volumes) – Flora of southern Hanover and adjacent areas.
- Wasserpflanzen und sumpf gewachse in Deutsch-Ostafrika (Berlin, 1928) – Aquatic and marsh plants of German East Africa.
- Flora von Deutsch-Ostafrika (Berlin, 1929–38) – Flora of German East Africa.
