= Gynocardin =

Names
- IUPAC name (1R,4S,5R)-4,5-Dihydroxy-1-[(2S,3R,4S,5S,6R)-3,4,5-trihydroxy-6-(hydroxymethyl)oxan-2-yl]oxycyclopent-2-ene-1-carbonitrile

Identifiers
CAS Number	14332-17-3
3D model (JSmol)	Interactive image
ChEBI	CHEBI:5578
ChemSpider	390192
KEGG	C08331
PubChem CID	441466
UNII	974UTB4YAU
- InChI: InChI=1S/C12H17NO8/c13-4-12(2-1-5(15)10(12)19)21-11-9(18)8(17)7(16)6(3-14)20-11/h1-2,5-11,14-19H,3H2/t5-,6+,7+,8-,9+,10+,11-,12+/m0/s1 Key: HASDUOHKNMHNJA-GDLVSTOPSA-N
- SMILES: C1=C[C@]([C@@H]([C@H]1O)O)(C#N)O[C@H]2[C@@H]([C@H]([C@@H]([C@H](O2)CO)O)O)O

Properties
Chemical formula	C_{12}H_{17}NO_{8}
Molar mass	303.267 g·mol^{−1}
- Except where otherwise noted, data are given for materials in their standard state (at 25 °C [77 °F], 100 kPa). Infobox references

Gynocardin is a chemical compound with the molecular formula C_{12}H_{17}NO_{8}. It is classified as a cyanogenic glycoside.

It was first isolated from Gynocardia odorata, from which it gets it name, and characterized in 1905. It has since been found in a variety of other plants, including those in the genus Passiflora (passionflowers).

Gynocardin may contribute to the toxicity of plants that contain it because, like other cyanogenic glycosides, cyanide is formed upon its hydrolysis.
