= Chlorocarpa =

Scientific classification
- Kingdom: Plantae
- Clade: Tracheophytes
- Clade: Angiosperms
- Clade: Eudicots
- Clade: Rosids
- Order: Malpighiales
- Family: Achariaceae
- Genus: Chlorocarpa; Alston
- Species: C. pentaschista

Binomial name
- Chlorocarpa pentaschista Alston

Genus of flowering plants

Chlorocarpa is a genus of flowering plants belonging to the family Achariaceae. It contains a single species, Chlorocarpa pentaschista, a tree endemic to Sri Lanka.
