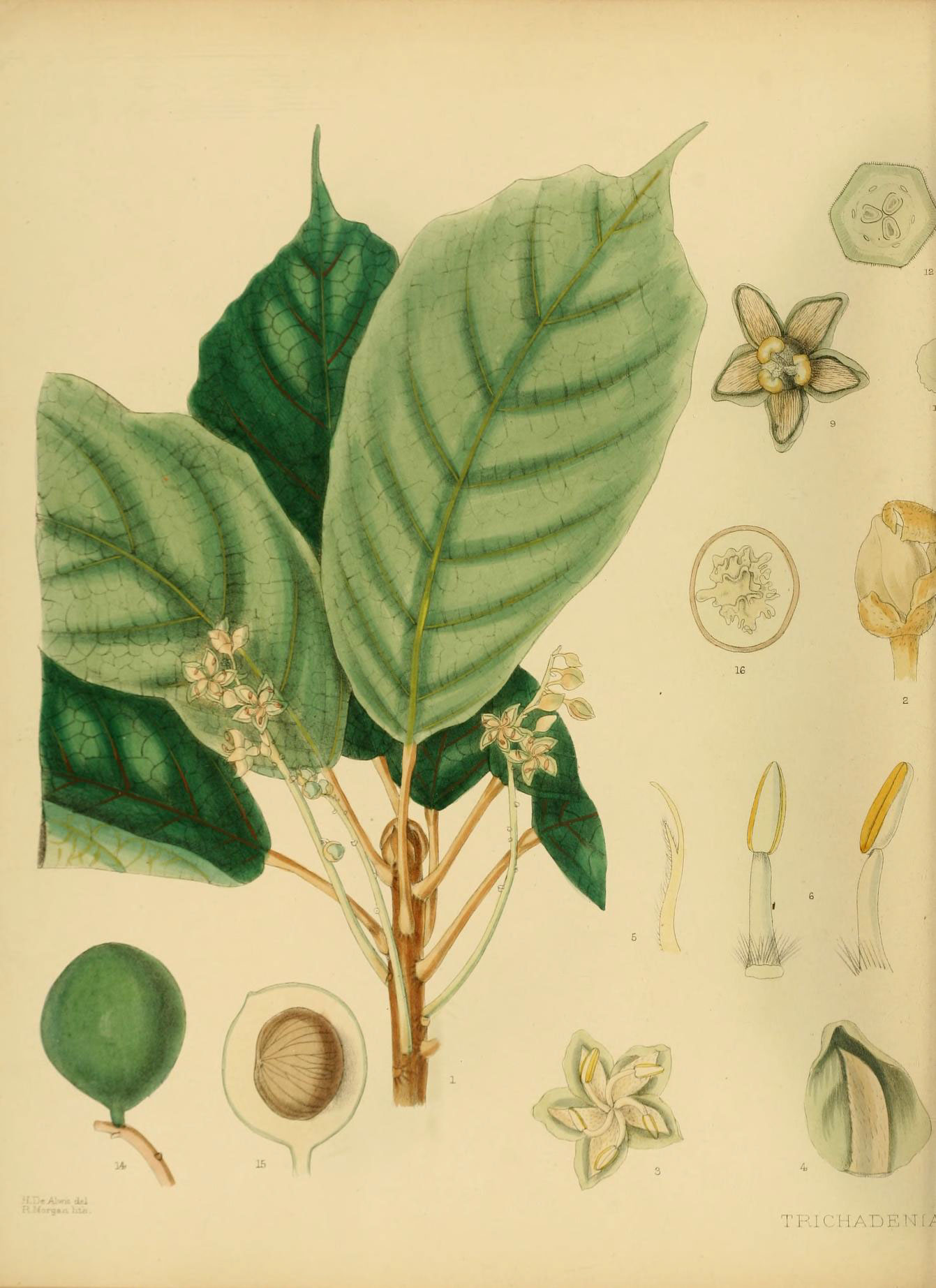
- Trichadenia zeylanica

Scientific classification
- Kingdom: Plantae
- Clade: Tracheophytes
- Clade: Angiosperms
- Clade: Eudicots
- Clade: Rosids
- Order: Malpighiales
- Family: Achariaceae
- Genus: Trichadenia; Thwaites (1855)

Species
- Trichadenia philippinensis Merr.; Trichadenia sasae W.N.Takeuchi; Trichadenia zeylanica Thwaites

Synonyms
- Leucocorema Ridl. (1916)

= Trichadenia =

Genus of flowering plants

Trichadenia is a genus of flowering plants in the family Achariaceae. It includes three species native to Sri Lanka, the Philippines, Sulawesi, Maluku Islands, and Papuasia (New Guinea, the Bismarck Archipelago, and Solomon Islands).

- Trichadenia philippinensis Merr. – Philippines, Sulawesi, Maluku, and Papuasia
- Trichadenia sasae W.N.Takeuchi – eastern New Guinea
- Trichadenia zeylanica Thwaites – Sri Lanka
