= Camptostylus ovalis =

Conservation status
- Near Threatened (IUCN 2.3)

Scientific classification
- Kingdom: Plantae
- Clade: Tracheophytes
- Clade: Angiosperms
- Clade: Eudicots
- Clade: Rosids
- Order: Malpighiales
- Family: Achariaceae
- Genus: Camptostylus
- Species: C. ovalis

Binomial name
- Camptostylus ovalis (Oliv.) Chipp

Synonyms
- Oncoba ovalis Oliv.; Camptostylus caudatus Gilg

Species of flowering plant

Camptostylus ovalis is a species of plant in the family Achariaceae. It is found in Cameroon and Nigeria. Its natural habitat is subtropical or tropical dry forests. It can grow up to 30 feet tall. It is threatened by habitat loss.
