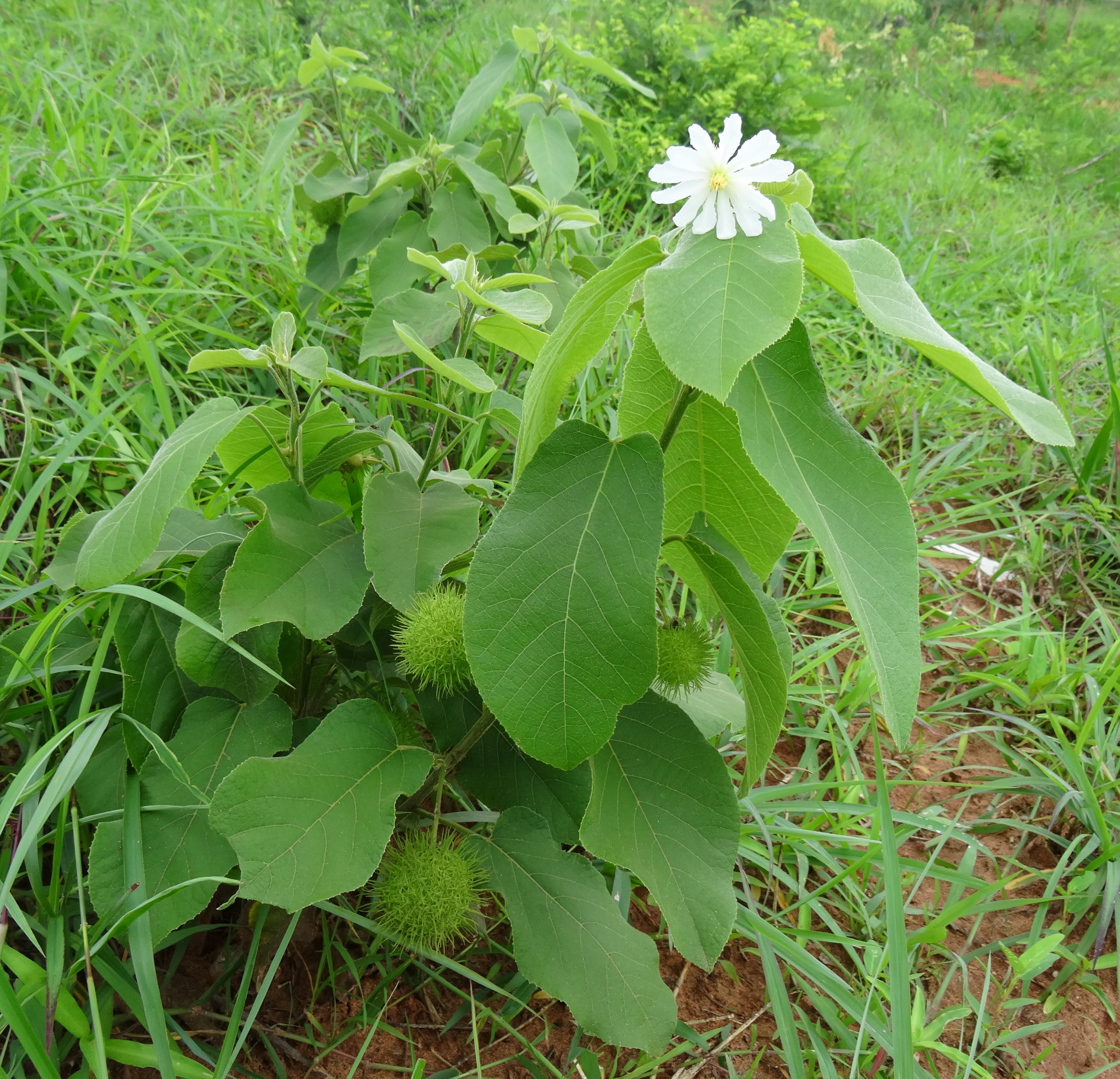
- Buchnerodendron lasiocalyx

Scientific classification
- Kingdom: Plantae
- Clade: Embryophytes
- Clade: Tracheophytes
- Clade: Spermatophytes
- Clade: Angiosperms
- Clade: Eudicots
- Clade: Rosids
- Order: Malpighiales
- Family: Achariaceae
- Genus: Buchnerodendron; Gürke

= Buchnerodendron =

Genus of flowering plants

Buchnerodendron is a genus of flowering plants belonging to the family Achariaceae.

Its native range is Tropical Africa.

Species:

- Buchnerodendron lasiocalyx (Oliv.) Gilg
- Buchnerodendron speciosum Gürke
