= Chiangiodendron =

Conservation status
- Endangered (IUCN 3.1)

Scientific classification
- Kingdom: Plantae
- Clade: Tracheophytes
- Clade: Angiosperms
- Clade: Eudicots
- Clade: Rosids
- Order: Malpighiales
- Family: Achariaceae
- Genus: Chiangiodendron; Wendt
- Species: C. mexicanum

Binomial name
- Chiangiodendron mexicanum Wendt

Genus of flowering plants

Chiangiodendron is a genus of flowering plants belonging to the family Achariaceae. It includes a single species, Chiangiodendron mexicanum, a tree native to southern Mexico, Belize, and Costa Rica.
