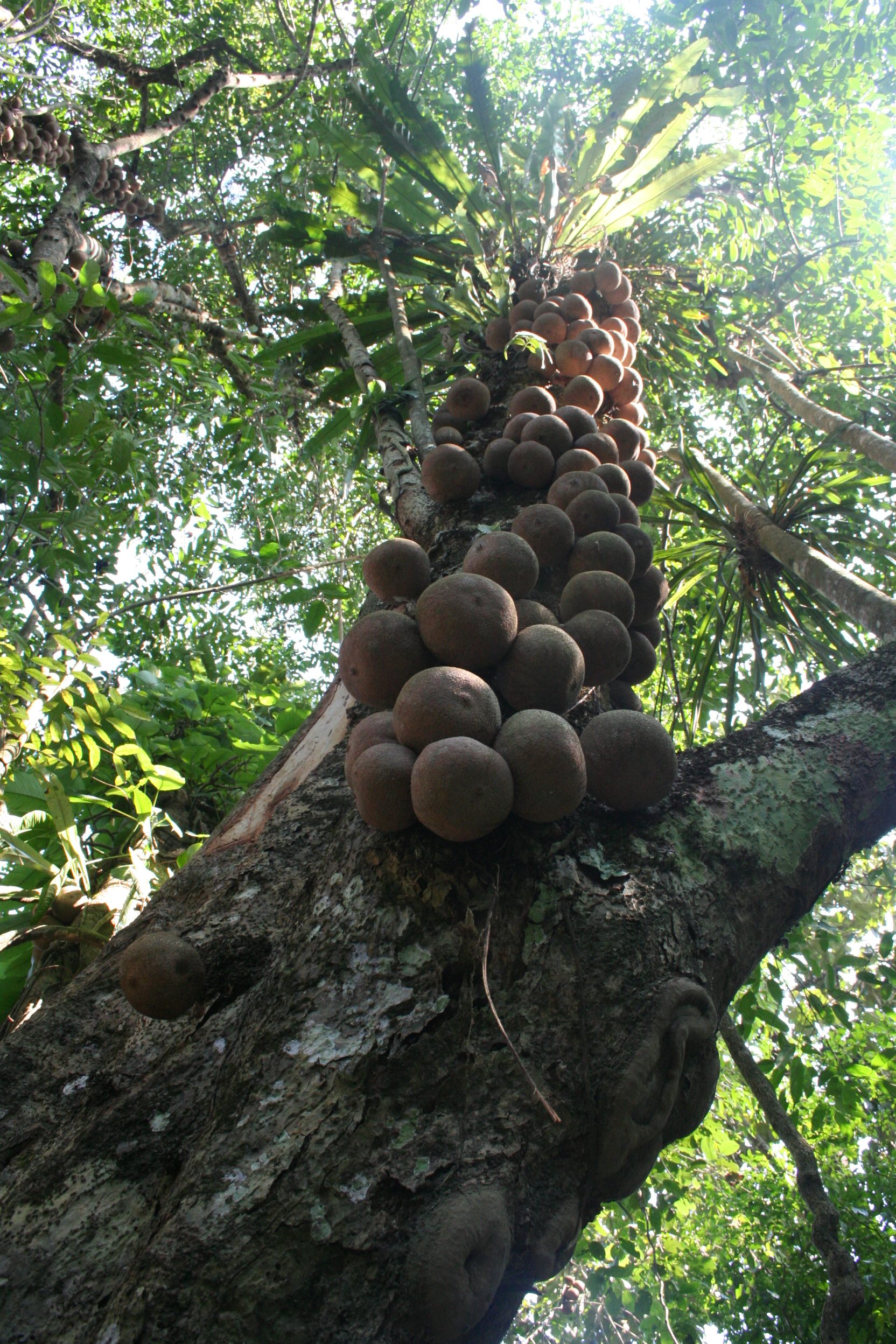

Scientific classification
- Kingdom: Plantae
- Clade: Tracheophytes
- Clade: Angiosperms
- Clade: Eudicots
- Clade: Rosids
- Order: Malpighiales
- Family: Achariaceae
- Genus: Gynocardia; R.Br.
- Species: G. odorata

Binomial name
- Gynocardia odorata R.Br.

Synonyms
- Chaulmoogra odorata Roxb. Chilmoria dodecandra Buch.-Ham.

= Gynocardia =

Species of tree

Gynocardia is a genus of dioecious evergreen tree belonging to the Achariaceae family, containing the sole species Gynocardia odorata. The trees grow up to 30 m tall. The species is found in moist forests of mountain valleys in South Asia - India, South-east Tibet and Yunnan in China, Bangladesh, Nepal, Bhutan and Myanmar.

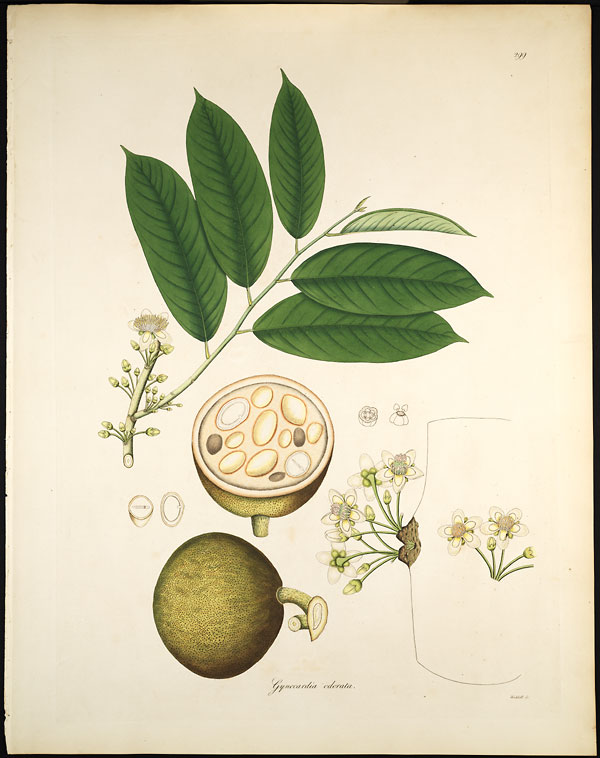
An illustration of the leaves and fruit from Roxburgh's Plants of the coast of Coromandel

The seeds of this plant have been confused with Hydnocarpus wightianus as the chaulmoogra oil, which is used in Indian medicine to treat several skin conditions and diseases. During British rule, several British doctors studied the use of this oil in the treatment of leprosy, lupus, scrofula, and many skin diseases. The oil was prescribed for leprosy as a mixture suspended in gum or as an emulsion. However, it has later been clarified that the actual chaulmoogra referred to in Sanskrit texts for the treatment of leprosy, as Tuvaraka is actually Hydnocarpus wightianus.

Gynocardin is a chemical compound, classified as a cyanogenic glycoside, that was first isolated from Gynocardia odorata and characterized in 1905.
