= Scaphocalyx =

Scientific classification
- Kingdom: Plantae
- Clade: Tracheophytes
- Clade: Angiosperms
- Clade: Eudicots
- Clade: Rosids
- Order: Malpighiales
- Family: Achariaceae
- Genus: Scaphocalyx; Ridl.
- Species: S. spathacea

Binomial name
- Scaphocalyx spathacea Ridl.

Genus of plants

Scaphocalyx is a monotypic genus of flowering plants belonging to the family Achariaceae. The only species is Scaphocalyx spathacea.

It is a tree native to Thailand, Peninsular Malaysia, Sumatra, and Borneo.
