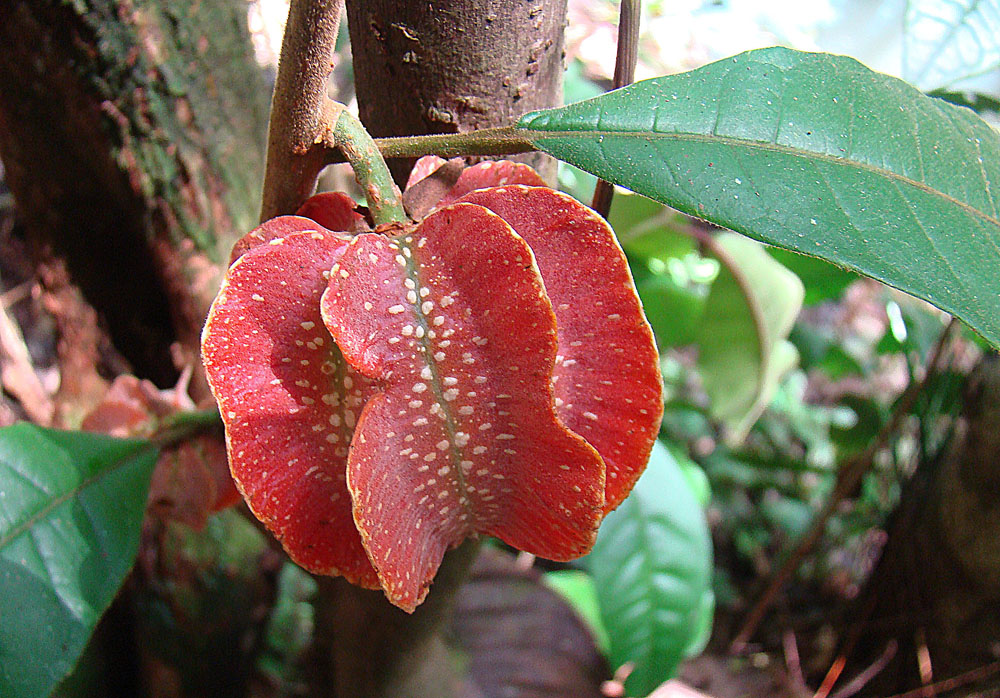
- Fruit of Carpotroche platyptera

Scientific classification
- Kingdom: Plantae
- Clade: Tracheophytes
- Clade: Angiosperms
- Clade: Eudicots
- Clade: Rosids
- Order: Malpighiales
- Family: Achariaceae
- Genus: Carpotroche; Endl.

Species
- See text

= Carpotroche =

Genus of flowering plants

Carpotroche is a genus of shrubs and trees in the family Achariaceae. It is native to the American tropics.

== Taxonomy ==
13 species are accepted.

- Carpotroche amazonica Mart. ex Eichler
- Carpotroche brasiliensis (Raddi) A.Gray
- Carpotroche caceresiae D. Santam
- Carpotroche crispidentata Ducke
- Carpotroche froesiana Sleumer
- Carpotroche grandiflora Spruce ex Eichler
- Carpotroche integrifolia Kuhlm.
- Carpotroche longifolia (Poepp.) Benth.
- Carpotroche pacifica (Cuatrec.) Cuatrec.
- Carpotroche pausandrifolia D.Santam. & Aguilar
- Carpotroche platyptera Pittier
- Carpotroche ramosii (Cuatrec.) Cuatrec.
- Carpotroche surinamensis Uittien
