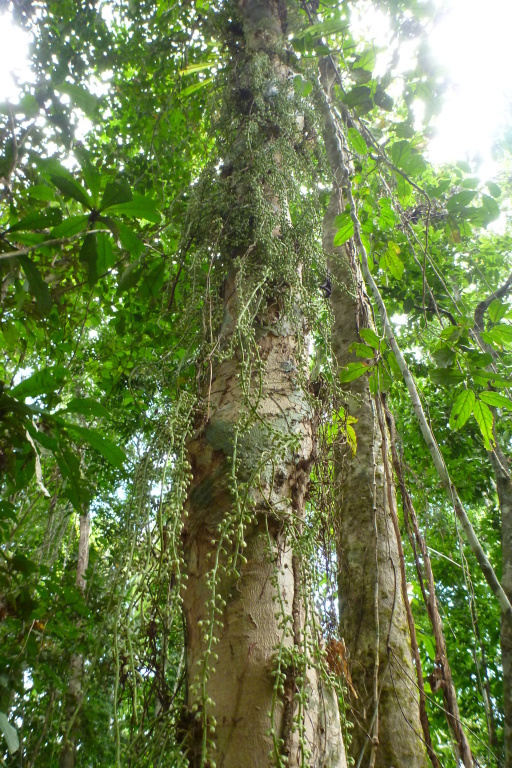
- Ryparosa javanica

Scientific classification
- Kingdom: Plantae
- Clade: Tracheophytes
- Clade: Angiosperms
- Clade: Eudicots
- Clade: Rosids
- Order: Malpighiales
- Family: Achariaceae
- Genus: Ryparosa; Blume

Synonyms
- Aspidandra Hassk.; Bergsmia Blume

= Ryparosa =

Genus of flowering plants

Ryparosa is a genus of plants in the family Achariaceae.

Its native range stretches from Indo-China to north-eastern Australia. It is found in the Andaman Islands, Borneo, Jawa, Lesser Sunda Islands, Malaya, Myanmar, New Guinea, Nicobar Islands, Philippines, Queensland (state in Australia), Sumatera, Thailand and Vietnam.

It was first described and published in Bijdr. Fl. Ned. Ind. on page 600 in 1826.

== Known species ==
According to Kew;

- Ryparosa acuminata Merr.
- Ryparosa anterides B.L.Webber
- Ryparosa baccaureoides Sleumer
- Ryparosa caesia Blume ex Baill.
- Ryparosa calotricha Mildbr.
- Ryparosa cauliflora Merr.
- Ryparosa fasciculata King
- Ryparosa glauca Ridl.
- Ryparosa hirsuta J.J.Sm.
- Ryparosa hullettii King
- Ryparosa javanica (Blume) Kurz ex Koord. & Valeton
- Ryparosa kostermansii Sleumer
- Ryparosa kunstleri King
- Ryparosa kurrangii B.L.Webber
- Ryparosa maculata B.L.Webber
- Ryparosa maycockii B.L.Webber
- Ryparosa micromera Slooten
- Ryparosa milleri B.L.Webber
- Ryparosa minor Ridl.
- Ryparosa multinervosa Slooten
- Ryparosa porcata P.F.Stevens
- Ryparosa wallichii Ridl.
- Ryparosa wrayi King
