= Grandidiera =

Scientific classification
- Kingdom: Plantae
- Clade: Tracheophytes
- Clade: Angiosperms
- Clade: Eudicots
- Clade: Rosids
- Order: Malpighiales
- Family: Achariaceae
- Genus: Grandidiera; Jaub.
- Species: G. boivinii

Binomial name
- Grandidiera boivinii Jaub.

Genus of plants

Grandidiera is a monotypic genus of flowering plants belonging to the family Achariaceae. The only species is Grandidiera boivinii Jaub.

Its native range is in south-eastern Kenya, Tanzania and Mozambique.

Alfred Grandidier (1836–1921), a French naturalist and explorer. The Latin specific epithet of boivinii refers to French explorer and plant collector Louis Hyacinthe Boivin (1808-1852). It was first published and described in Bull. Soc. Bot. France Vol.13 on page 467 in 1866.
