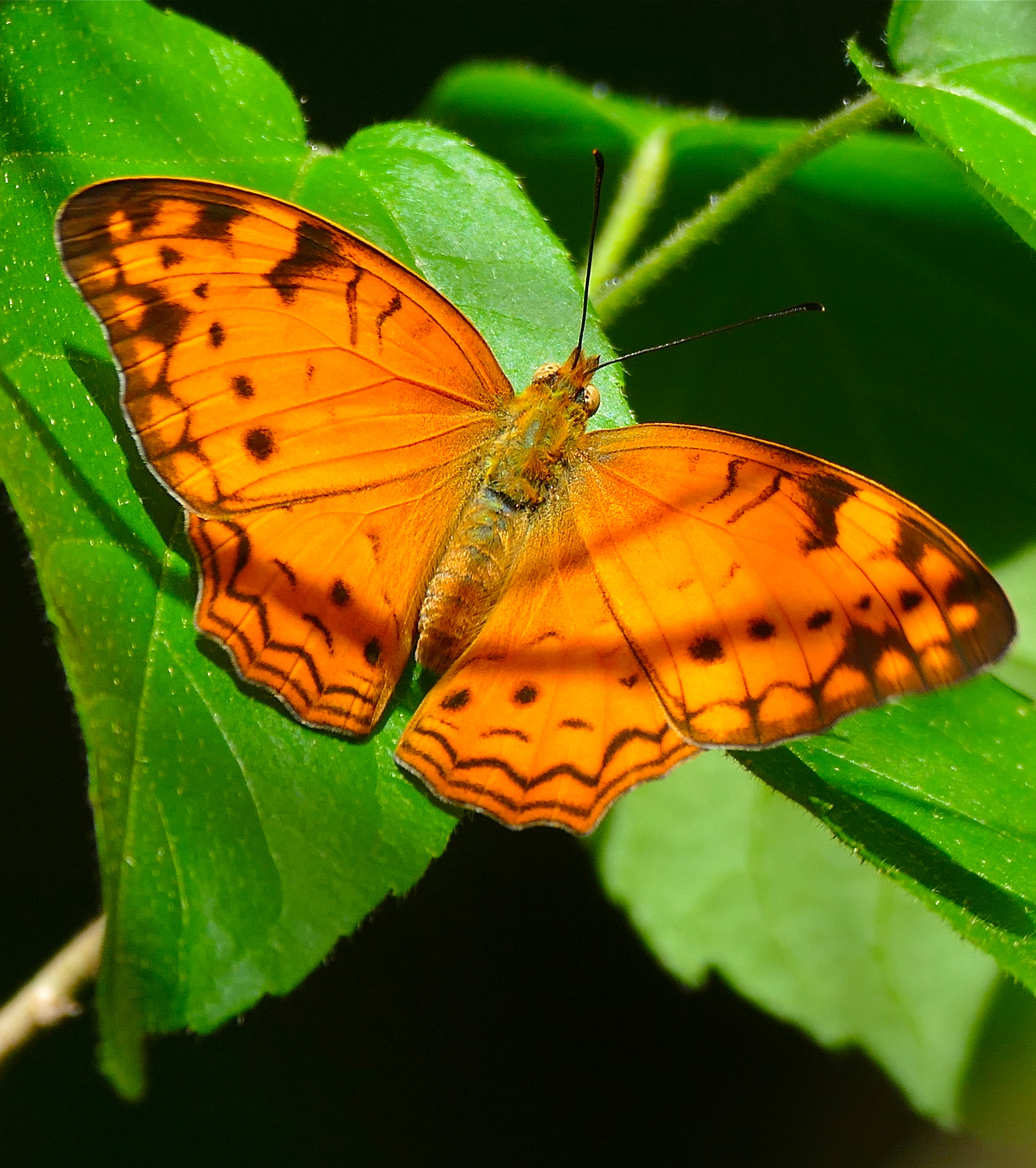
- Blotched Leopard (Lachnoptera ayresii)

Scientific classification
- Kingdom: Animalia
- Phylum: Arthropoda
- Clade: Pancrustacea
- Class: Insecta
- Order: Lepidoptera
- Family: Nymphalidae
- Tribe: Vagrantini
- Genus: Lachnoptera; Doubleday, [1847]

= Lachnoptera =

Genus of brush-footed butterflies

Lachnoptera is a genus of butterflies in the family Nymphalidae.

== Species ==
| Image | Scientific name | Distribution |
|---|---|---|
| | Lachnoptera ayresii Trimen, 1879 | Port St. Johns in the Eastern Cape and then along the escarpment to the midlands of KwaZulu-Natal, Swaziland, Mpumalanga and the Wolkberg in Limpopo, north to Zimbabwe and Mozambique. |
| | Lachnoptera anticlia (Hübner, [1819]) | Senegal, Guinea, Sierra Leone, Liberia, Ivory Coast, Ghana, Togo, Nigeria, Cameroon, Equatorial Guinea, Gabon, the Republic of the Congo, the Central African Republic, Angola, the Democratic Republic of the Congo, southern Sudan, Uganda, western Kenya, north-western Tanzania and north-western Zambia. |
