= Fossa ovalis =

Fossa ovalis ("oval-shaped depression") can refer to:

- Fossa ovalis (thigh), also called the saphenous opening
- Fossa ovalis (heart), an embryonic remnant of the foramen ovale

== See also ==
- Fossa (disambiguation)
- Ovalis (disambiguation)
