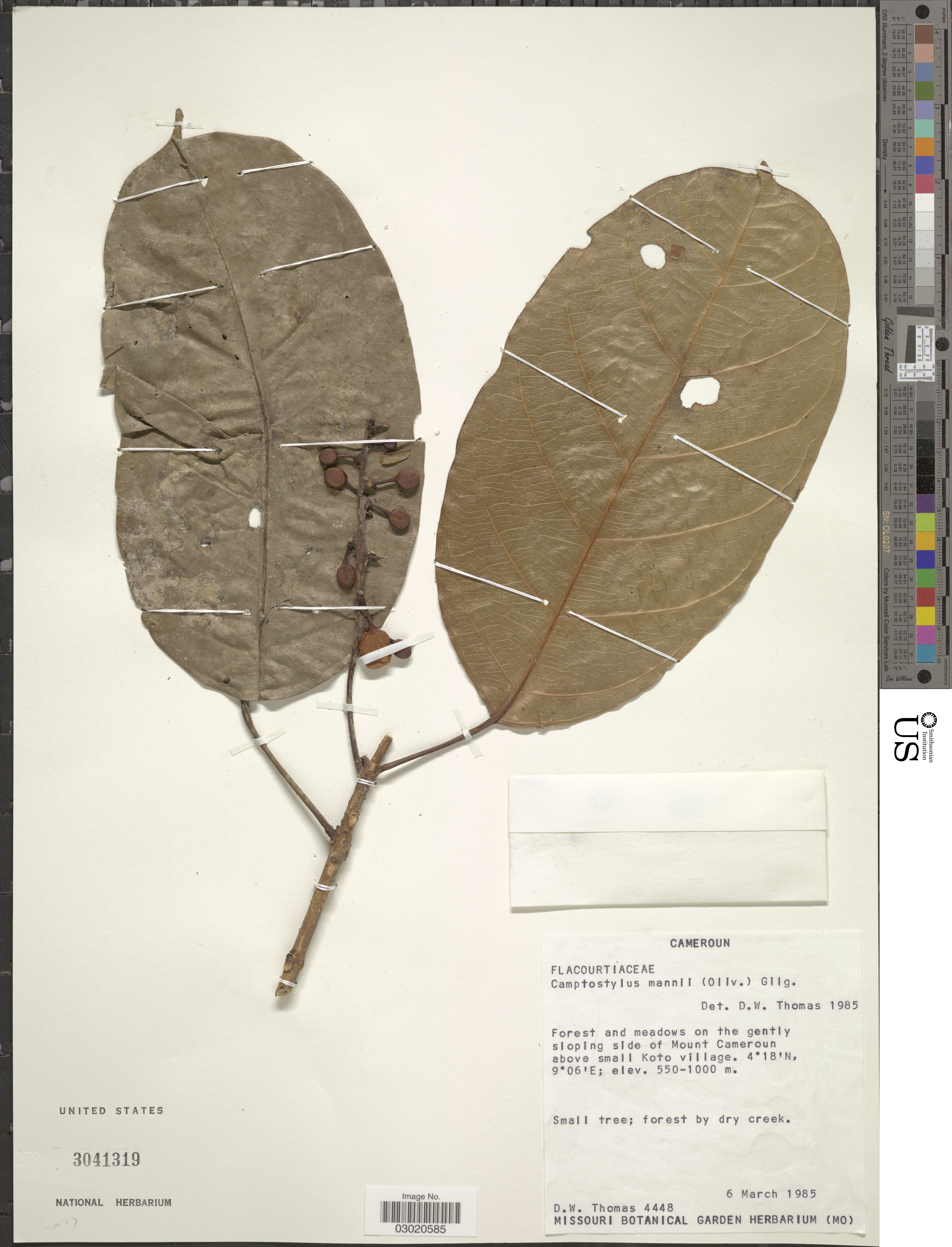
- Camptostylus mannii specimen at National Museum of Natural History, Washington

Scientific classification
- Kingdom: Plantae
- Clade: Tracheophytes
- Clade: Angiosperms
- Clade: Eudicots
- Clade: Rosids
- Order: Malpighiales
- Family: Achariaceae
- Genus: Camptostylus; Gilg

Synonyms
- Cerolepis Pierre

= Camptostylus =

Genus of flowering plants

Camptostylus is a genus of flowering plants belonging to the family Achariaceae.

Its native range is Western Tropical Africa to Angola.

Species:

- Camptostylus kivuensis Bamps
- Camptostylus mannii (Oliv.) Gilg
- Camptostylus ovalis (Oliv.) Chipp
