= Eleutherandra =

Scientific classification
- Kingdom: Plantae
- Clade: Tracheophytes
- Clade: Angiosperms
- Clade: Eudicots
- Clade: Rosids
- Order: Malpighiales
- Family: Achariaceae
- Genus: Eleutherandra; Slooten
- Species: E. pes-cervi

Binomial name
- Eleutherandra pes-cervi Slooten

Genus of plants

Eleutherandra is a monotypic genus of flowering plants belonging to the family Achariaceae. The only species is Eleutherandra pes-cervi, a tree native to Borneo and southern Sumatra.
