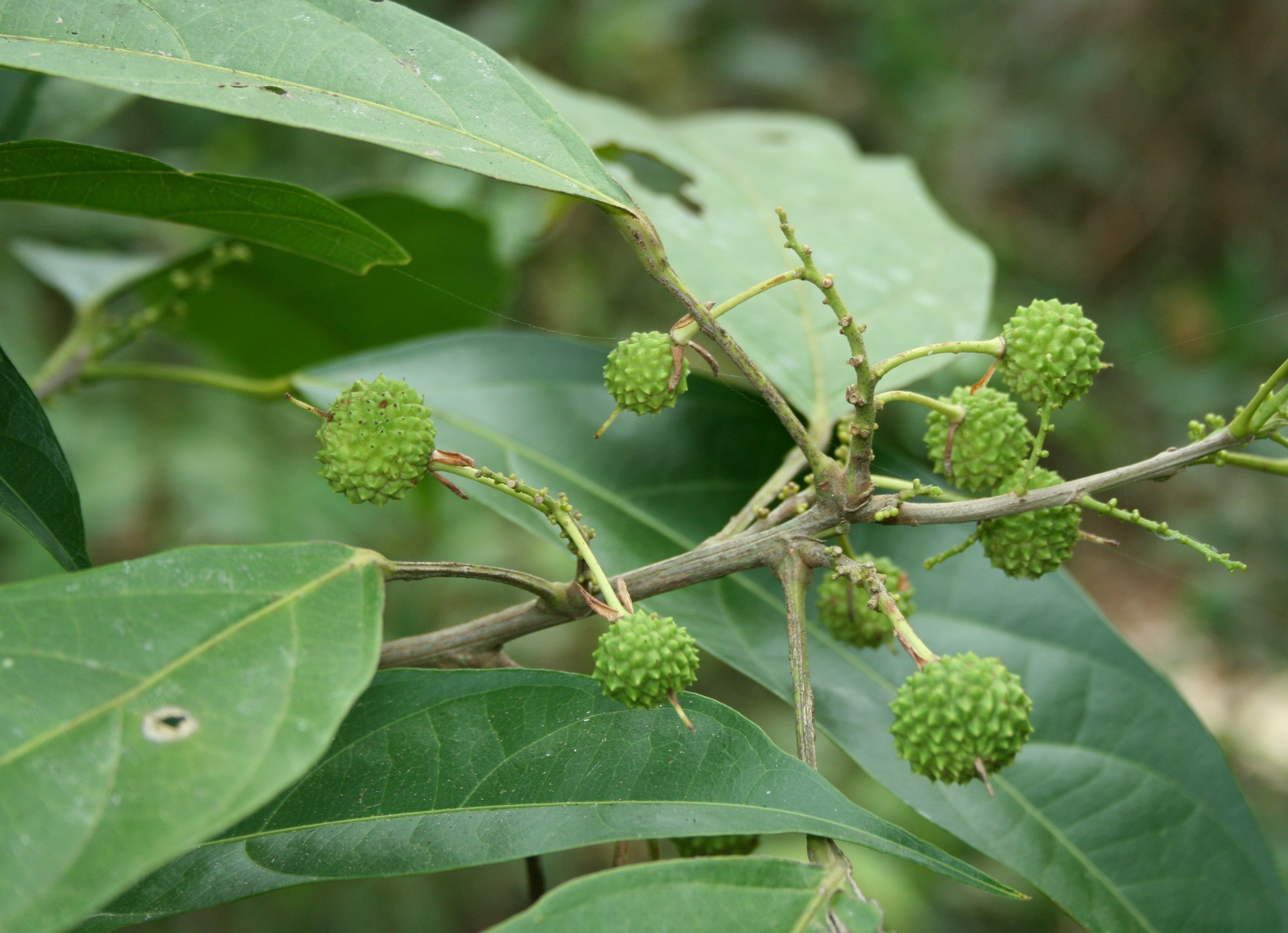

Scientific classification
- Kingdom: Plantae
- Clade: Tracheophytes
- Clade: Angiosperms
- Clade: Eudicots
- Clade: Rosids
- Order: Malpighiales
- Family: Achariaceae
- Genus: Lindackeria; C.Presl

= Lindackeria =

Genus of flowering plant

Lindackeria is a genus of flowering plants belonging to the family Achariaceae.

Its native range is south-eastern Mexico to southern Tropical America and Tropical Africa. It is found in the countries of Angola, Belize, Benin, Bolivia, Brazil, Burundi, Cabinda, Cameroon, Central African Republic, Colombia, Congo, Costa Rica, Ecuador, Gabon, Ghana, Guatemala, Guinea, Guyana, Ivory Coast, Kenya, Liberia, Malawi, Mexico, Nicaragua, Nigeria, Peru, Rwanda, Sierra Leone, Somalia, Sudan, Tanzania, Togo, Uganda, Zambia and Zaïre.

The genus name of Lindackeria is in honour of Johann Thaddaeus Lindacker (1768–1816), Bohemian mineralogist from Banská Štiavnica, who collected plants for his herbarium. It was first described and published in Reliq. Haenk. Vol.2 on page 89 in 1835.

== Known species ==
According to Kew:

- Lindackeria bukobensis Gilg
- Lindackeria cuneatoacuminata (De Wild.) Gilg
- Lindackeria dentata (Oliv.) Gilg
- Lindackeria fragrans (Gilg) Gilg
- Lindackeria latifolia Benth.
- Lindackeria laurina C.Presl
- Lindackeria ngounyensis Pellegr.
- Lindackeria ovata (Benth.) Gilg
- Lindackeria paludosa (Benth.) Gilg
- Lindackeria paraensis Kuhlm.
- Lindackeria pauciflora Benth.
- Lindackeria poggei (Gürke) Gilg
- Lindackeria schweinfurthii Gilg
- Lindackeria stipulata (Oliv.) Milne-Redh. & Sleumer
