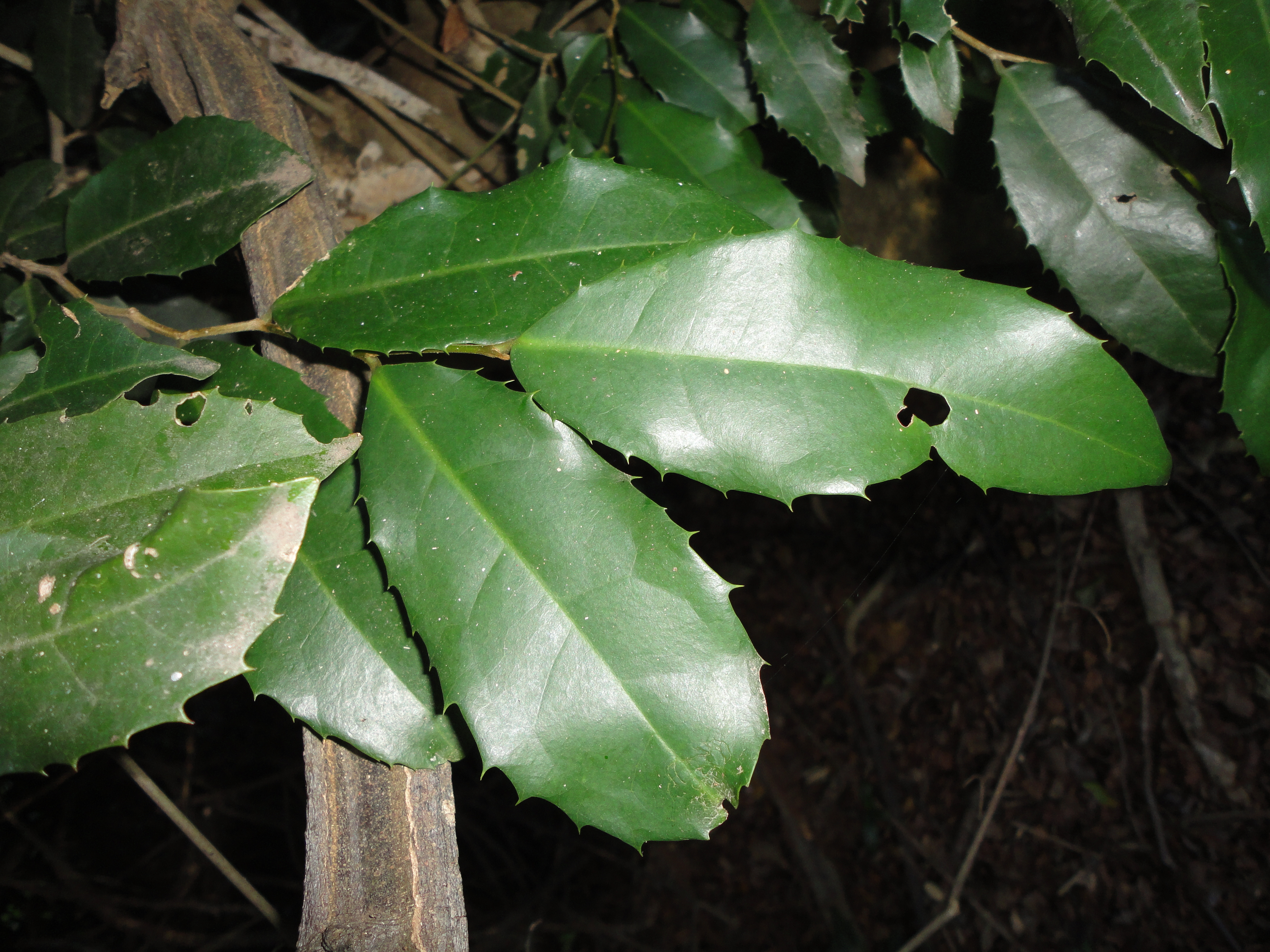
- Foliage of R. lucida in Durban

Scientific classification
- Kingdom: Plantae
- Clade: Tracheophytes
- Clade: Angiosperms
- Clade: Eudicots
- Clade: Rosids
- Order: Malpighiales
- Family: Achariaceae
- Genus: Rawsonia; Harv. & Sond.

= Rawsonia =

Genus of flowering plants

Rawsonia is a genus of flowering plants in the family Achariaceae. It includes two species native to sub-Saharan Africa, ranging from Sudan and Somalia to Angola and South Africa.

== Species ==
Plants of the World Online accepts two species:

- Rawsonia burtt-davyi (Edlin) F.White
- Rawsonia lucida Harv. & Sond. (synonyms include: R. reticulata Gilg, R. spinidens (Hiern) Mendonca ex Sleumer)
