= Ovalis =

Ovalis, oval in Latin, may refer to:

- Fossa ovalis (disambiguation)
- Limbus of fossa ovalis, the prominent oval margin of the fossa ovalis
