= Dasylepis (plant) =

Scientific classification
- Kingdom: Plantae
- Clade: Tracheophytes
- Clade: Angiosperms
- Clade: Eudicots
- Clade: Rosids
- Order: Malpighiales
- Family: Achariaceae
- Genus: Dasylepis; Oliv.

Synonyms
- Pyramidocarpus Oliv.

Genus of flowering plants

Dasylepis is a genus of flowering plants belonging to the family Achariaceae.

Its native range is Tropical Africa.

Species:

- Dasylepis blackii (Oliv.) Chipp
- Dasylepis eggelingii J.B.Gillett
- Dasylepis integra Warb.
- Dasylepis racemosa Oliv.
- Dasylepis seretii De Wild.
- Dasylepis thomasii Obama & Breteler
