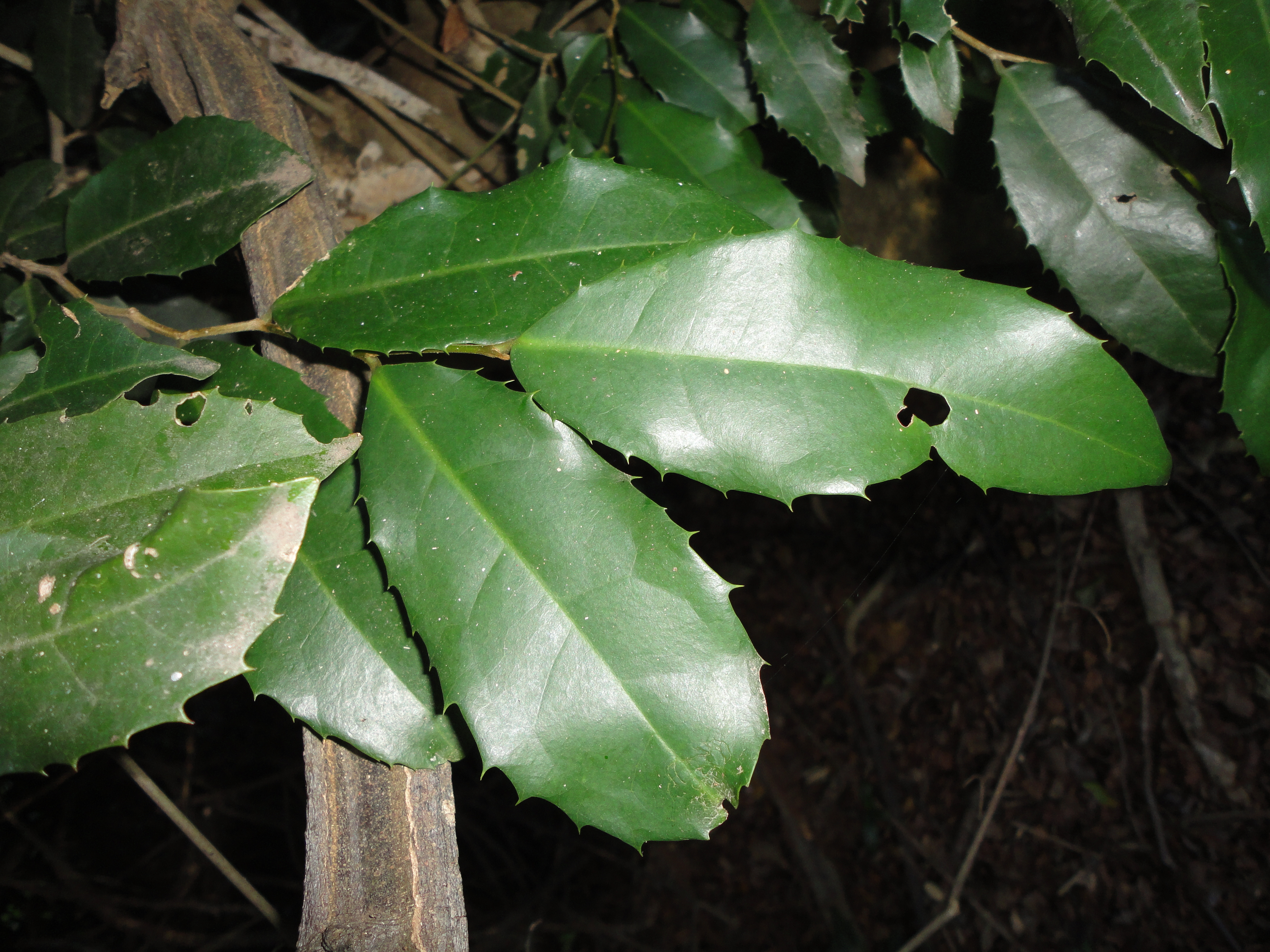

Conservation status
- Least Concern (IUCN 3.1)

Scientific classification
- Kingdom: Plantae
- Clade: Tracheophytes
- Clade: Angiosperms
- Clade: Eudicots
- Clade: Rosids
- Order: Malpighiales
- Family: Achariaceae
- Genus: Rawsonia
- Species: R. lucida

Binomial name
- Rawsonia lucida Harv. & Sond.

Synonyms
- Rawsonia reticulata Gilg; Rawsonia schlechteri Gilg; Rawsonia spinidens (Hiern) Mendonça & Sleumer; Rawsonia transjubensis Chiov.; Rawsonia ugandensis Dawe & Sprague; Rawsonia uluguruensis Sleumer; Rawsonia usambarensis Engl. & Gilg; Oncoba spinidens Hiern

= Rawsonia lucida =

Species of flowering plant

Rawsonia lucida (synonym R. reticulata) is a species of plant in the Achariaceae family. It is found in eastern, central and southern Africa.
