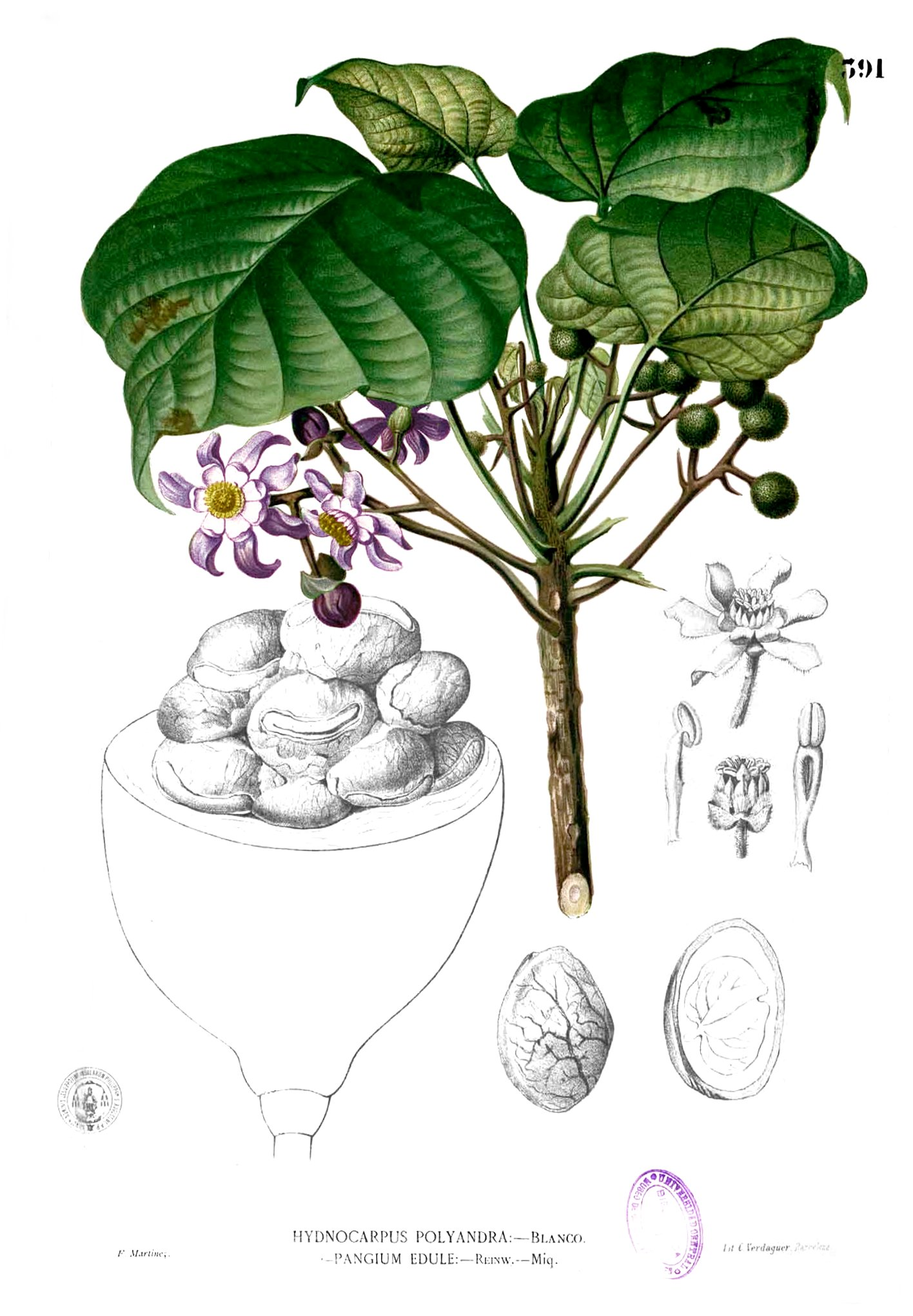
- Pangium edule

Scientific classification
- Kingdom: Plantae
- Clade: Tracheophytes
- Clade: Angiosperms
- Clade: Eudicots
- Clade: Rosids
- Order: Malpighiales
- Family: Achariaceae; Harms

Type genus
- Acharia Thunb.

= Achariaceae =

Achariaceae Temporal range: Early Paleocene - recent

Family of flowering plants

Achariaceae is a family of flowering plants consisting of 31 genera and about 155 species of tropical herbs, shrubs, and trees. The APG IV system has greatly expanded the scope of the family by including many genera previously classified in Flacourtiaceae. Molecular data strongly support the inclusion of this family in the order Malpighiales.

The family is almost exclusively tropical and is best known as the source of chaulmoogra oil, formerly used to treat leprosy. Unlike other members of the former Flacourtiaceae now placed in the family Salicaceae, the genera of Achariaceae typically have cyanogenic glycosides.

== Genera ==
The following 31 genera are accepted by Plants of the World Online as of 23 January 2026:

- Acharia Thunb.
- Ahernia Merr.
- Baileyoxylon C.T.White
- Buchnerodendron Gürke
- Caloncoba Gilg
- Camptostylus Gilg
- Carpotroche Endl.
- Ceratiosicyos Nees
- Chiangiodendron Wendt
- Chlorocarpa Alston
- Dasylepis Oliv.
- Eleutherandra Slooten
- Erythrospermum Lam.
- Grandidiera Jaub.
- Guthriea Bolus
- Gynocardia R.Br.
- Hydnocarpus Gaertn.
- Kiggelaria L.
- Kuhlmanniodendron Fiaschi & Groppo
- Lindackeria C.Presl
- Mayna Aubl.
- Pangium Reinw.
- Peterodendron Sleumer
- Poggea Gürke
- Prockiopsis Baill.
- Rawsonia Harv. & Sond.
- Ryparosa Blume
- Scaphocalyx Ridl.
- Scottellia Oliv.
- Trichadenia Thwaites
- Xylotheca Hochst.
