= Tenneru Formation =

Geological formation in Hokkaidō, Japan

The Tenneru Formation (天寧層, Tenneru-sō), sometimes in older literature the Tenneru Conglomerate Member of the Chorobetsu Formation, is a geological formation in southeast Hokkaidō, Japan, in the area of Kushiro. Deposited between the Harutori Formation and Yūbetsu Formation in the Urahoro Group that unconformably overlies the Nemuro Group in the Nemuro Belt, the Tenneru Formation correlates with the Rushin Formation at its western end. The Formation, laid down in the Late Eocene, consists mainly of reddish and reddish brown conglomerate, with some sandstone and mudstone; there are several intercalated coal seams. New species of fauna described from the Tenneru Formation include the "Kushiro tapir" [ja] (Plesiocolopirus kushiroensis; protonym: Colodon kushiroensis), and of flora, Actinidia harutoriensis, Alnus ezoensis, Aralia ezoana, Cordia japonica, Cupania japonica, Idesia kushiroensis, Lastrea kushiroensis, and Maesa nipponica.

== Flora ==
The Tenneru Flora as described by Tanai Toshimasa in 1970 from the areas where the Tenneru Formation is exposed, with a thickness of some 300 m (980 ft), along the upper stretches of the Tokomuro River (常室川) in the western Kushiro coal field, comprises sixteen families and twenty genera, including two Pteridophytes, one Equisetum, and two conifers, the remaining species being dicotyledons:

- Family: Osmundaceae
  - Genus: Osmunda
    - Osmunda sachalinensis
- Family: Polypodiaceae
  - Genus: Lastrea
    - Lastrea kushiroensis
- Family: Equisetaceae
  - Genus: Equisetum
    - Equisetum arcticum
- Family: Taxodiaceae
  - Genus: Glyptostrobus
    - Glyptostrobus europaeus
  - Genus: Metasequoia
    - Metasequoia occidentalis
- Family: Aceraceae
  - Genus: Acer
    - Acer arcticum
- Family: Actinidiaceae
  - Genus: Actinidia
    - Actinidia harutoriensis
- Family: Alangiaceae
  - Genus: Alangium
    - Alangium basiobliquum
    - Alangium basitruncatum
- Family: Araliaceae
  - Genus: Aralia
    - Aralia ezoana
- Family: Betulaceae
  - Genus: Alnus
    - Alnus ezoensis
- Family: Boraginaceae
  - Genus: Cordia
    - Cordia japonica
- Family: Cercidiphyllaceae
  - Genus: Cercidiphyllum
    - Cercidiphyllum eojaponicum
- Family: Flacourtiaceae
  - Genus: Idesia
    - Idesia kushiroensis
- Family: Myrsinaceae
  - Genus: Maesa
    - Maesa nipponica
- Family: Platanaceae
  - Genus: Platanus
    - Platanus aceroides
    - Platanus guillelmae
- Family: Sapindaceae
  - Genus: Cupania
    - Cupania japonica
- Family Ulmaceae
  - Genus: Planera
    - Planera ezoana
  - Genus: Trema
    - Trema asiatica
  - Genus: Ulmus
    - Ulmus harutoriensis
  - Genus: Zelkova
    - Zelkova kushiroensis

== See also ==
- Kushiro Coal Mine
- Kushiro City Museum
