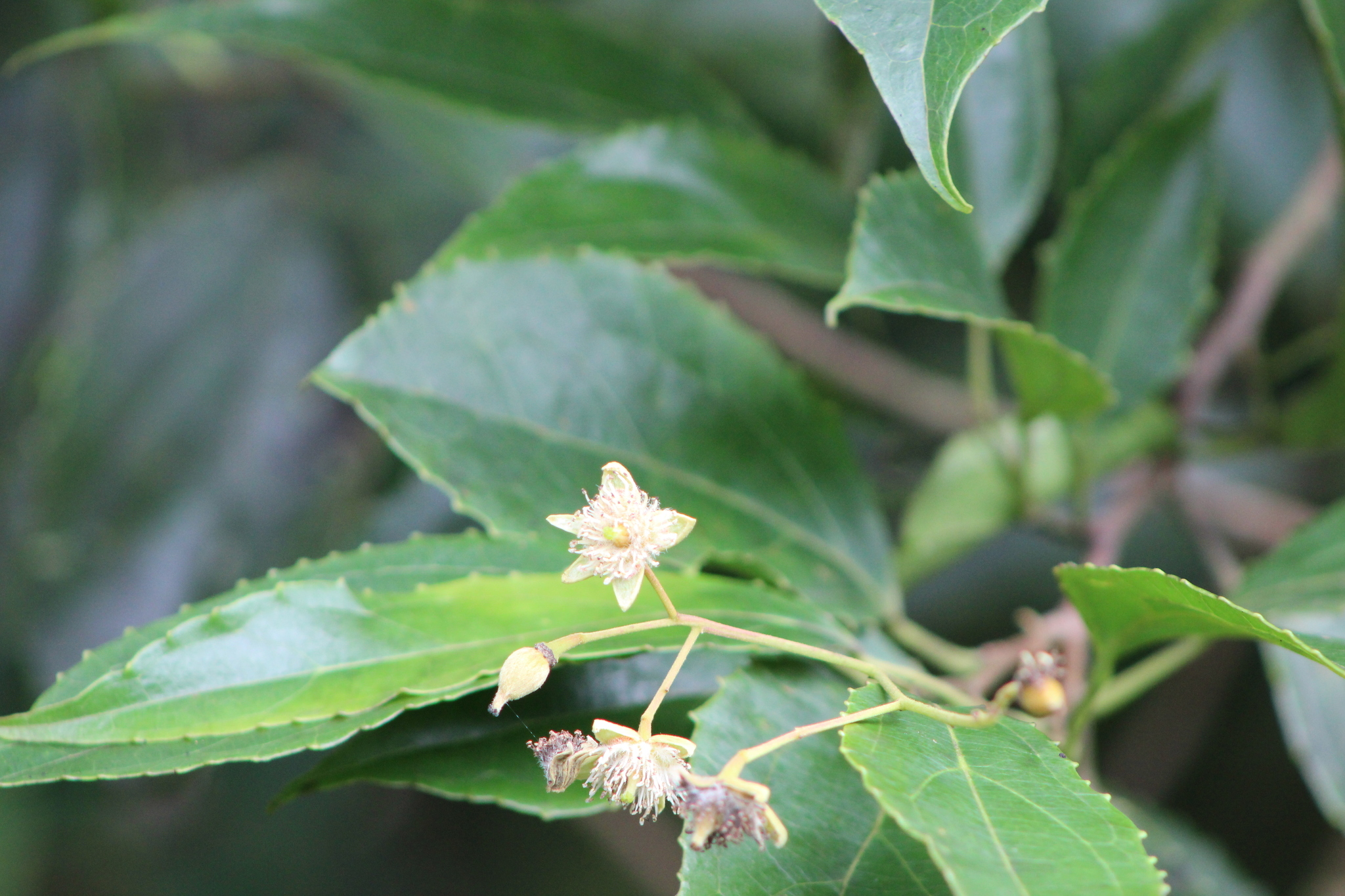

Scientific classification
- Kingdom: Plantae
- Clade: Tracheophytes
- Clade: Angiosperms
- Clade: Eudicots
- Clade: Rosids
- Order: Malpighiales
- Family: Salicaceae
- Subfamily: Salicoideae
- Tribe: Prockieae
- Genus: Macrohasseltia; L.O. Williams
- Species: M. macroterantha

Binomial name
- Macrohasseltia macroterantha (Standl. & L.O. Williams) L.O. Williams

Synonyms
- Hasseltia macroterantha Standl. & L.O. Williams

= Macrohasseltia =

Genus of trees

Macrohasseltia is a monotypic genus of flowering plants in the family Salicaceae. It consists of one species of tree: Macrohasseltia macroterantha, which is native to Central America. Formerly placed in the heterogeneous family Flacourtiaceae, Macrohasseltia is now classified in Salicaceae, along with close relatives Bennettiodendron, Carrierea, Idesia, Itoa, Olmediella, Poliothyrsis, and even the willows (Salix) and cottonwoods (Populus) themselves.
