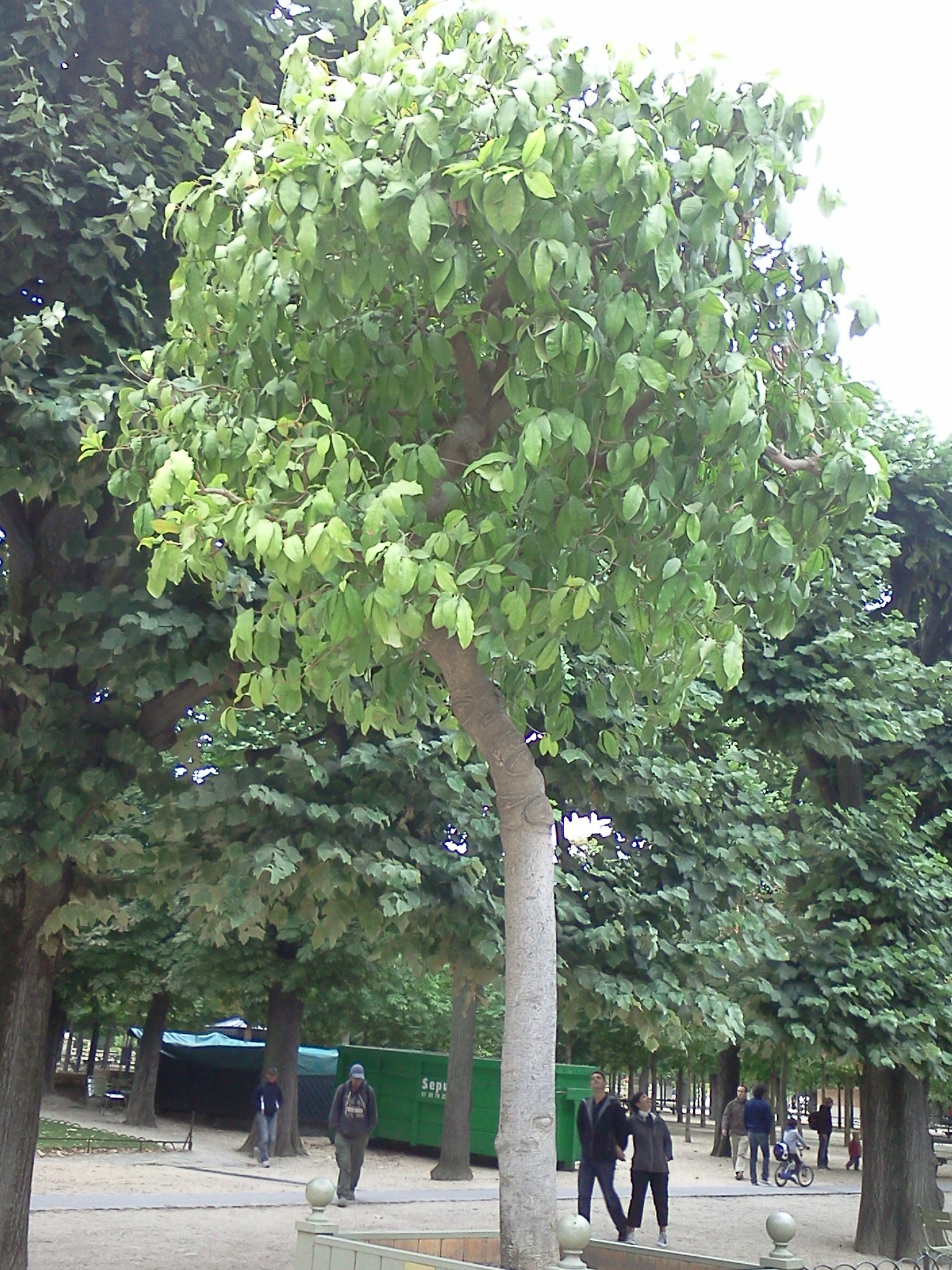

Scientific classification
- Kingdom: Plantae
- Clade: Tracheophytes
- Clade: Angiosperms
- Clade: Eudicots
- Clade: Rosids
- Order: Malpighiales
- Family: Salicaceae
- Subfamily: Salicoideae
- Tribe: Saliceae
- Genus: Olmediella; Baill.
- Species: O. betschleriana

Binomial name
- Olmediella betschleriana (Göpp.) Loes.

= Olmediella =

Genus of trees

Olmediella is a monotypic genus of flowering plants in the family Salicaceae. It consists of one species of trees: Olmediella betschleriana, which is native to Central America. Formerly placed in the heterogeneous family Flacourtiaceae, Olmediella is now classified in Salicaceae, along with close relatives Bennettiodendron, Carrierea, Idesia, Itoa, Macrohasseltia, Poliothyrsis, and even the willows (Salix) and cottonwoods (Populus) themselves.

Olmediella has a number of features that point to its close relationship to the willows (Salix), including flowers subtended by prominent bracts, flowers with a highly reduced calyx, and nectaries located next to each stamen or pistil. Its sometimes spiny-margined leaves, though, are unlike those of any Salix, and some early botanists even included the species in the genus Ilex.
