= List of geological belts of Japan =

This list is of the geological belts (帯, tai), the structural geotectonic units, of Japan. The Geological Survey of Japan subdivides the Japanese archipelago into twenty-seven belts, though these are subject to scholarly revision and local variation as to naming. (For instance, the Geological Survey of Japan has the North(ern) Kitakami Belt extending into the Oshima Peninsula and beyond in southwest Hokkaidō, while Isozaki et al. (2010) and Barnes (2013) write of the N(orthern) Kitakami-Oshima Belt, and Takahashi et al. (2016) recognize the North Kitakami Belt and the Oshima Belt; Ueda (2016) treats the "Rebun-Kabato Belt" as a sub-belt of this Oshima Belt (i.e., Rebun-Kabato Sub-belt).)

== List of belts ==
The twenty-seven belts according to the Geological Survey of Japan are as follows:

- Hida Belt (飛騨帯)
- Hida Gaien Belt (飛弾外縁帯)
- Sangun-Renge Belt (三郡 – 蓮華帯)
- Suo Belt (周防帯)
- Akiyoshi Belt (秋吉帯)
- Maizuru Belt (舞鶴帯)
- Ultra-Tamba Belt (超丹波帯)
- Tamba Belt (丹波帯)
- Mino Belt (美濃帯)
- Ryōke Belt (領家帯)
- Higo Belt (肥後帯)
- Nagasaki Belt (長崎帯)
- Sanbagawa Belt (三波川帯)
- Chichibu Belt (秩父帯)
- Kurosegawa Belt (黒瀬川帯)
- Shimanto Belt (四万十帯)
- Ashio Belt (足尾帯)
- Jōetsu Belt (上越帯)
- Abukuma Belt (阿武隈帯)
- South Kitakami Belt (南部北上帯)
- Nedamo Belt (根田茂帯)
- North Kitakami Belt (北部北上帯)
- Sorachi–Yezo Belt (空知 – エゾ帯)
- Kamuikotan Belt (神居古潭帯)
- Hidaka and Tokoro Belts (日高帯・常呂帯)
- Hidaka Metamorphic Belt (日高変成帯)
- Nemuro Belt (根室帯)

== See also ==
- Geology of Japan
