= Astygisa vexillaria =

Scientific classification
- Kingdom: Animalia
- Phylum: Arthropoda
- Class: Insecta
- Order: Lepidoptera
- Family: Geometridae
- Genus: Astygisa
- Species: A. vexillaria

Binomial name
- Astygisa vexillaria (Guenée, 1858)

Synonyms
- Petelia vexillaria Guenée, 1858; Pachydia vexillaria Guenée, 1857; Pachydia capitata Walker, 1861; Astygisa larentiata Walker, 1864; Alana rubiginata Walker, 1866

Species of moth

Astygisa vexillaria is a moth of the family Geometridae first described by Achille Guenée in 1858. It is found in Sri Lanka, the Indian subregion and Sundaland.

The ground color is brownish with some rusty colored tints. Discal spot in hindwings obscure at most a minute pale dot. Host plants of the caterpillar include Ziziphus mauritiana, and Hovenia dulcis.
