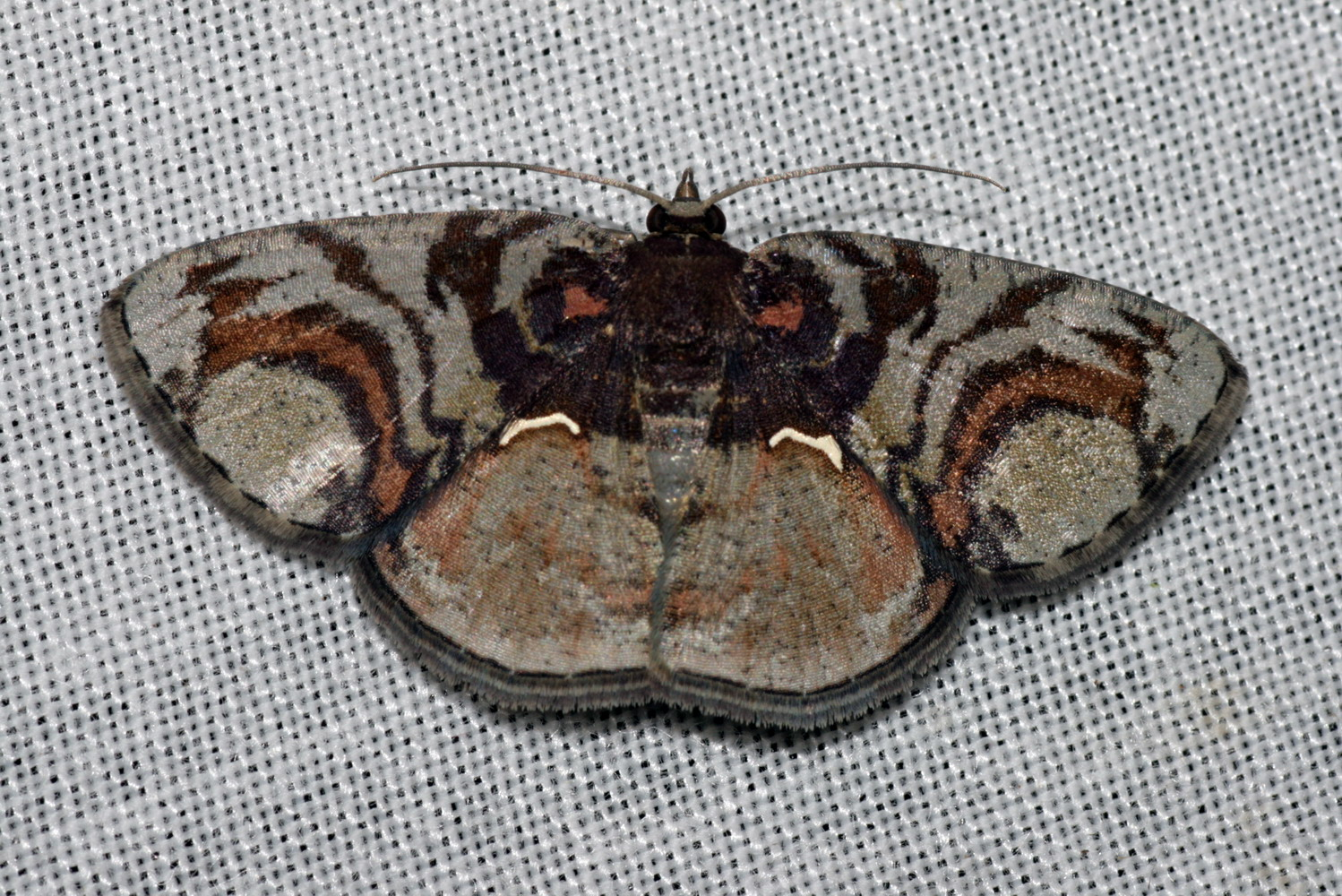

Scientific classification
- Domain: Eukaryota
- Kingdom: Animalia
- Phylum: Arthropoda
- Class: Insecta
- Order: Lepidoptera
- Family: Geometridae
- Genus: Astygisa
- Species: A. circularia

Binomial name
- Astygisa circularia (C. Swinhoe, 1902)

Synonyms
- Petelia circularia C. Swinhoe, 1902

= Astygisa circularia =

Species of moth

Astygisa circularia is a moth of the family Geometridae first described by Charles Swinhoe in 1902. It is found in Sumatra, Java, Sulawesi and Borneo.
