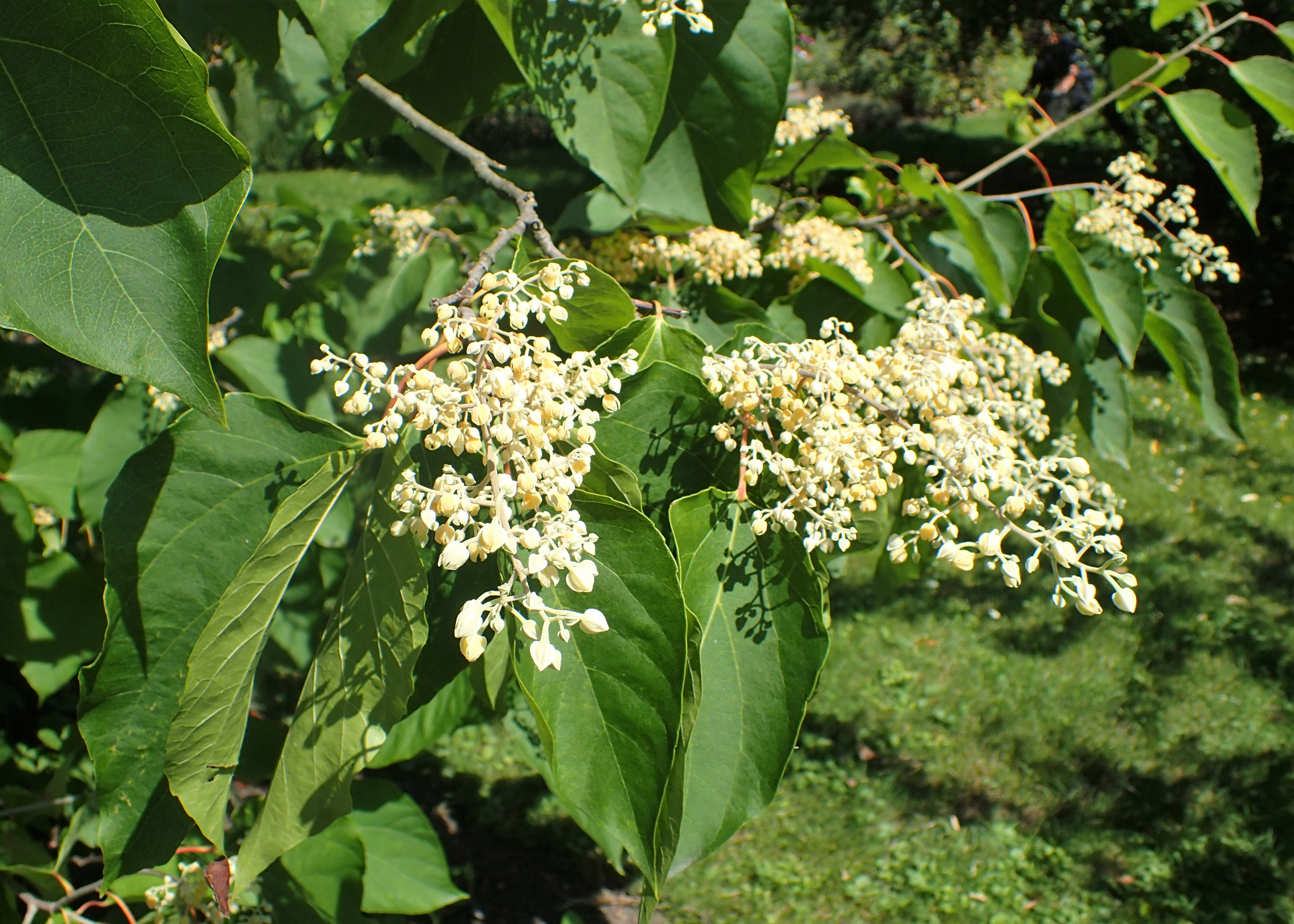

Scientific classification
- Kingdom: Plantae
- Clade: Tracheophytes
- Clade: Angiosperms
- Clade: Eudicots
- Clade: Rosids
- Order: Malpighiales
- Family: Salicaceae
- Subfamily: Salicoideae
- Tribe: Saliceae
- Genus: Poliothyrsis; Oliv.
- Species: P. sinensis

Binomial name
- Poliothyrsis sinensis Hook.f.

= Poliothyrsis =

Genus of plants

Poliothyrsis is a monotypic genus of flowering plants belonging to the willow family Salicaceae (although placed formerly in the now defunct family Flacourtiaceae (within which it is usually to be found listed in older works of reference)). The single arborescent species is Poliothyrsis sinensis, Chinese common name: 山拐枣 shān guǎi zǎo English common name: Chinese pearl-bloom tree

== Description ==
A small deciduous tree 7-15m in height and circa 6m in spread, with pubescent young shoots. Leaves ovate, long-pointed 11.5 to 15 cm in length, very downy beneath when young, petioles reddish, 19-38mm long. Flowers small, circa 8.5mm across, at first white but becoming yellowish, in terminal, loose panicles 15 cm or more in length, both male and female in the same inflorescence, borne in June–July. Fruit a dry capsule, ovoid, tomentose, individual valves acutely fusiform (= spindle-shaped), 2–3 cm, ca. 1 cm in diam. Seeds wind-dispersed, compressed-flat, each surrounded and enclosed by a ± elliptic or oblong wing 5–10 mm, seed proper small, less than 1/2 as long as wing. Fruits borne July–September.

=== Unusual seed capsules ===
The ripe seed capsules of P. sinensis, which initially resemble in size and shape those of the lilac, develop to display a remarkable 'double dehiscence'. When ripe, they assume a greenish-gray colour, after which their outer layer sloughs off to reveal inner walls of a buff colour. Once the outer walls have fallen away the remaining inner walls dehisce both by three valves from the tip, and, more surprisingly, by three from the base, creating what is effectively a tube, toothed above and below, through which the wind can blow out the small winged seeds. This uncommon ‘double dehiscence’, by both apex and base, is to be found also in the seed capsules of the unrelated Franklinia alatamaha (Franklinia being a monotypic genus belonging to the tea plant family Theaceae). Long after the seeds of Poliothyrsis have been dispersed by the wind, the empty capsules, with their gaping teeth at either end, remain on the plant well into the winter months, lending decorative interest with their unusual form.

== Resemblance to Idesia ==
Poliothyrsis bears a marked resemblance (particularly in its foliage) to Idesia, another monotypic genus belonging, (as also do the familiar Poplars and Willows) to tribe Saliceae of the family Salicaceae. As the RHS points out, Poliothyrsis differs from Idesia in the following three points:

- the leaves are 5-nerved, not more, at base
- the flowers have valvate, not imbricate sepals
- the fruit is a dry capsule containing winged seeds, not an edible, red berry.

== Etymology of scientific names ==
The genus name Poliothyrsis is of Greek derivation, being composed of the elements πολιός (polios), meaning "light grey", "grizzled" or "silvery" (employed usually in reference to human hair) and θύρσος (thyrsos) meaning "stalk" or "wand" (or, in a botanical sense, panicle), juxtaposed to give the apt description "bearing silvery (or bright) flower clusters". The Latin specific epithet sinensis, used in the name of the single species, means "native to China".

== Etymology of Chinese common name ==
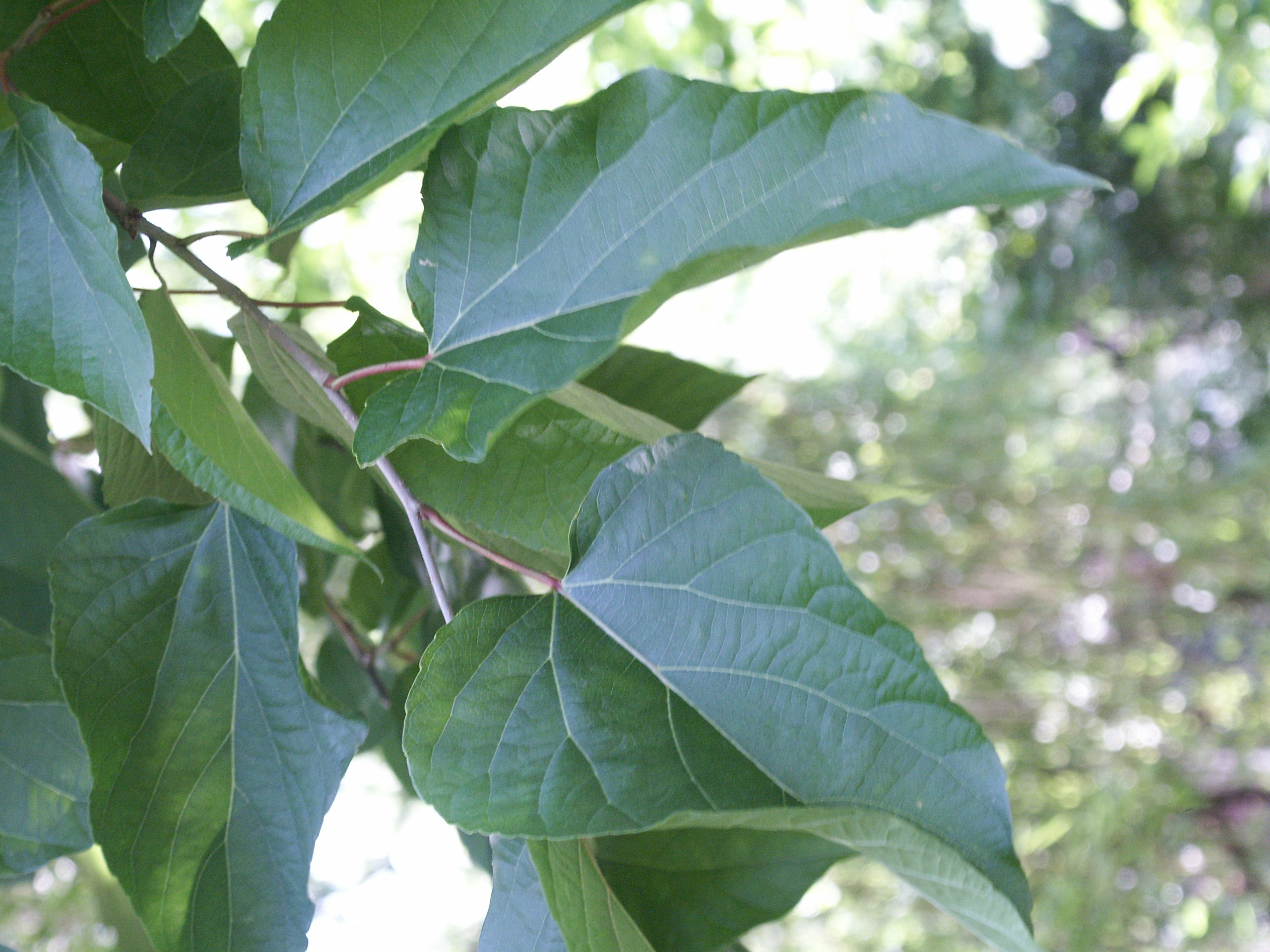
Foliage of Poliothyrsis sinensis

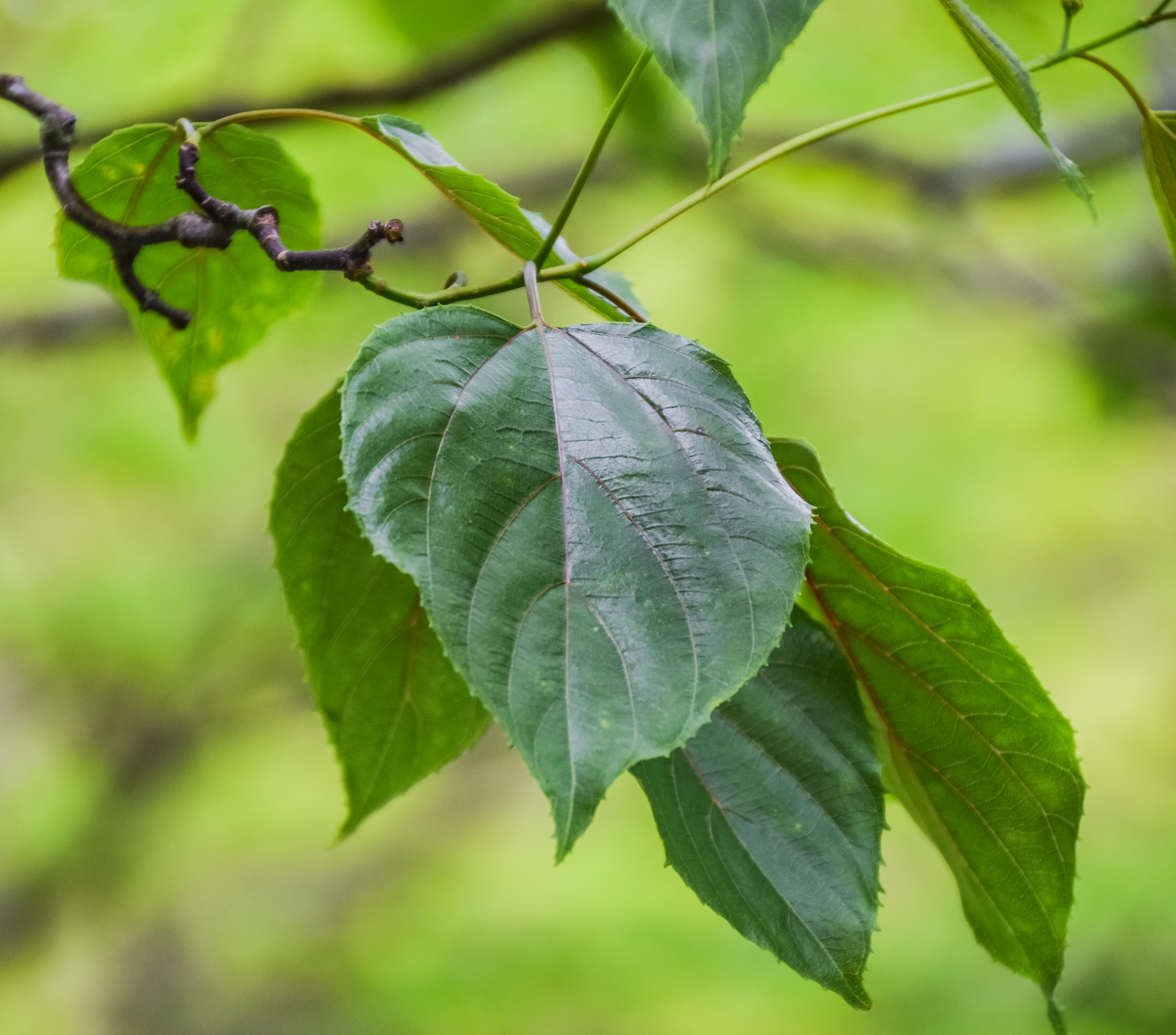
Foliage of Hovenia acerba

山拐枣 (shān guǎi zǎo), the Chinese vernacular name for P. sinensis, translates as "mountain raisin tree", where the character 山 (shān) signifies "mountain" and the two-character compound 拐 枣 (guǎi zǎo)* designates the fruit tree Hovenia acerba (family Rhamnaceae). The likeness between Poliothyrsis and Hovenia referenced in this common name is one not of fruit but of foliage (unlike Hovenia acerba, Poliothyrsis does not produce edible fruit): the leaves of Poliothyrsis sinensis bear a marked resemblance to those of Hovenia acerba. The qualification "mountain" references the fact that, while the ranges of P. sinensis and H. acerba overlap in central China, P. sinensis (as noted below) shows a preference for the mountainous areas of this region. Hovenia acerba readily presents itself as a tree species inviting comparison with others present in Southern China, since it has not only long been cultivated for its edible fruit (used also in the preparation of traditional wines), but has also been widely used as a street tree in southern Chinese cities.

- Note: the character 枣 (zǎo), unqualified by the character 拐 (guǎi) and used alone or in other compound names, can signify "jujube" or "date", with an overarching sense of "sweet fruit".

== Range ==
Its native range is North-Central, South-Central, and Southeast China, where temperate climates of various subtypes prevail (Köppen climate classification group C).

== Habitat ==
P. sinensis occurs in evergreen and deciduous broad-leaved mixed forests and deciduous broad-leaved forests on mountain slopes or at the foot of mountains, growing at altitudes of 400–1500 m.

== Ornamental ==
=== Aesthetic appeal ===
Although frequently used in landscaping projects in its native China, the plant is not yet common in cultivation in Europe and the US, despite its merits - which are acknowledged as considerable by Jonathan Damery of the Arnold arboretum, who describes the plant in glowing terms as “ show-stopping”, a potential “garden celebrity” and having “elegance”, “class” and a praiseworthy “lack of gaudiness” in its restrained beauty. The tree is grown for its glossy, dark, emerald green leaves (which later provide warm yellow Autumn colour) and fragrant, papery, greenish-white flowers which gradually become yellow as they mature.

=== Cultivation ===
P. sinensis is fully hardy in the U.K. and is best grown in a fertile, well-drained soil in full sun or partial shade, with shelter from cold, drying winds. It requires minimal pruning, such pruning consisting in the removal of wayward or crossing shoots in late Winter or early Spring, with the aim of maintaining a robust and shapely framework. The plant is best propagated by the sowing of seed in containers in an open frame in Autumn, but may also be increased vegetatively by the taking of greenwood cuttings in Summer. In regard to pests and diseases, the plant is generally trouble-free.

=== Hardiness ===
The tree is hardy to USDA Zone 6 (circa −5 °F (−20.6 °C)).

== Uses ==
Profuse in its production of fragrant flowers, the tree is valued as a nectar plant in its native China. The wood is fine-grained and of good quality and is used in China in the making of furniture and the carving of various utensils.

== Chemistry ==
In the year 1969, pioneering French chemotaxonomist Victor Plouvier published a paper in which he recorded his isolation of a new crystalline glycoside from P. sinensis, which he had duly named poliothyrsoside. However, only a year later, in 1970, H. Thieme published another scientific paper in which he demonstrated that poliothyrsoside was in fact chemically identical to the glycoside nigracin, first isolated and characterised from the bark and leaves of Populus nigra, the black poplar, by himself and his colleague R. Benecke in 1967. A Japanese investigation of 2014 noted the presence of three compounds of interest in the plant: 3-(6-O-Benzoyl-β-D-glucopyranosyloxy)-5-hydroxycinnamic acid methyl ester, Flacourtoside A and Homaloside.

== Gallery ==
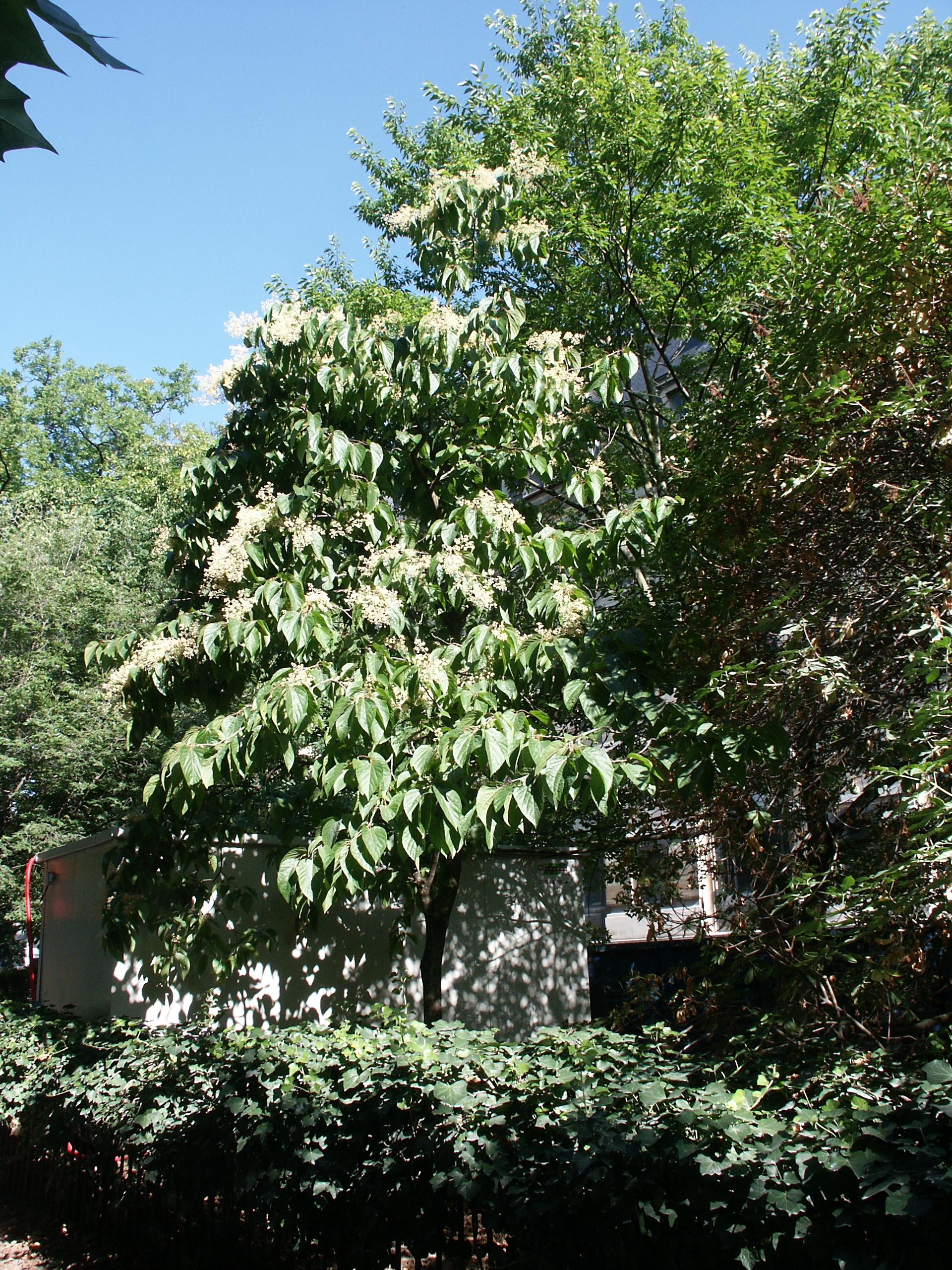
Mature tree in flower, showing contrasting foliage and flower panicles of canopy. Jardin des plantes

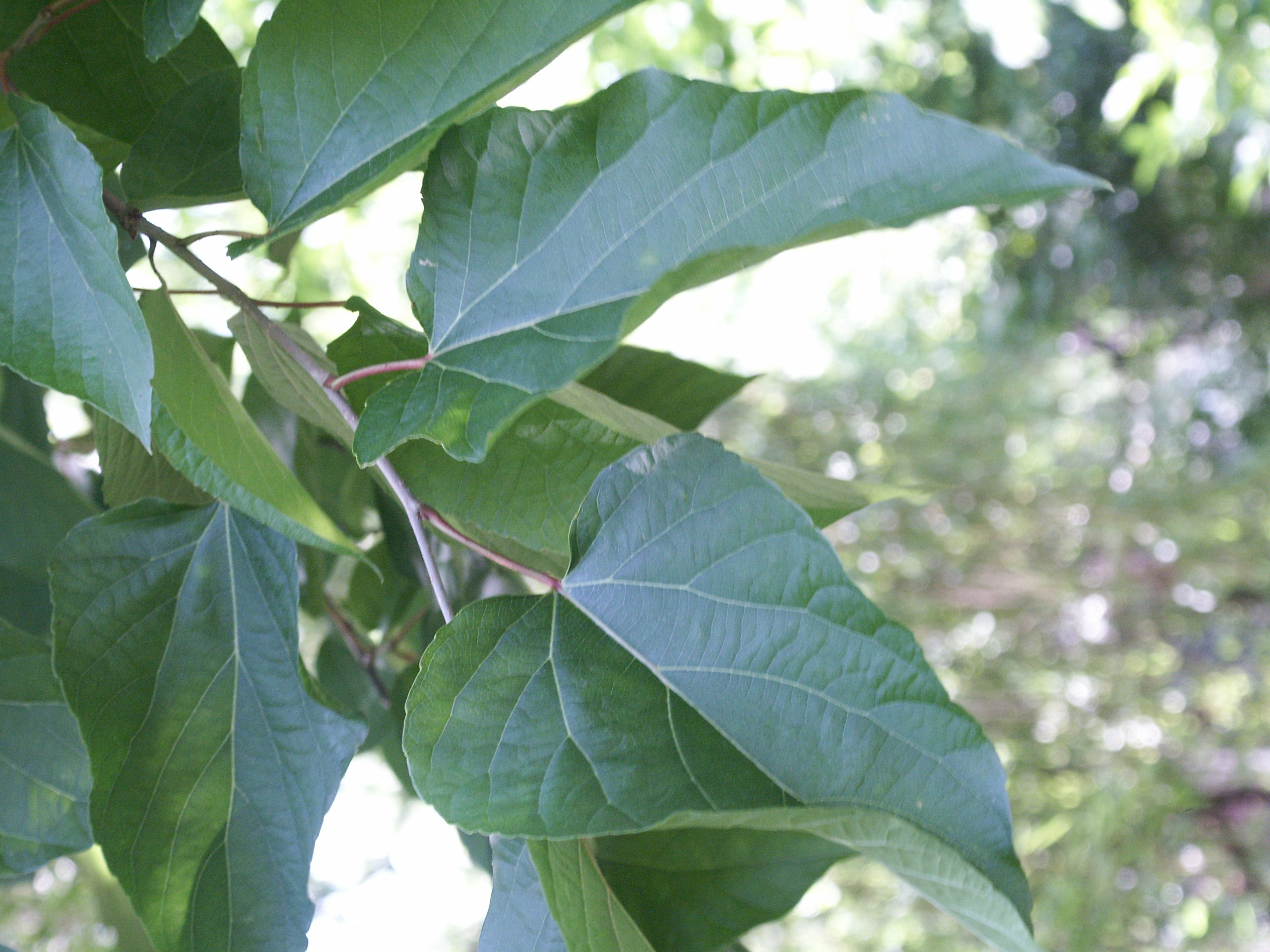
Detail of foliage, Jardin botanique de l'Université de Strasbourg

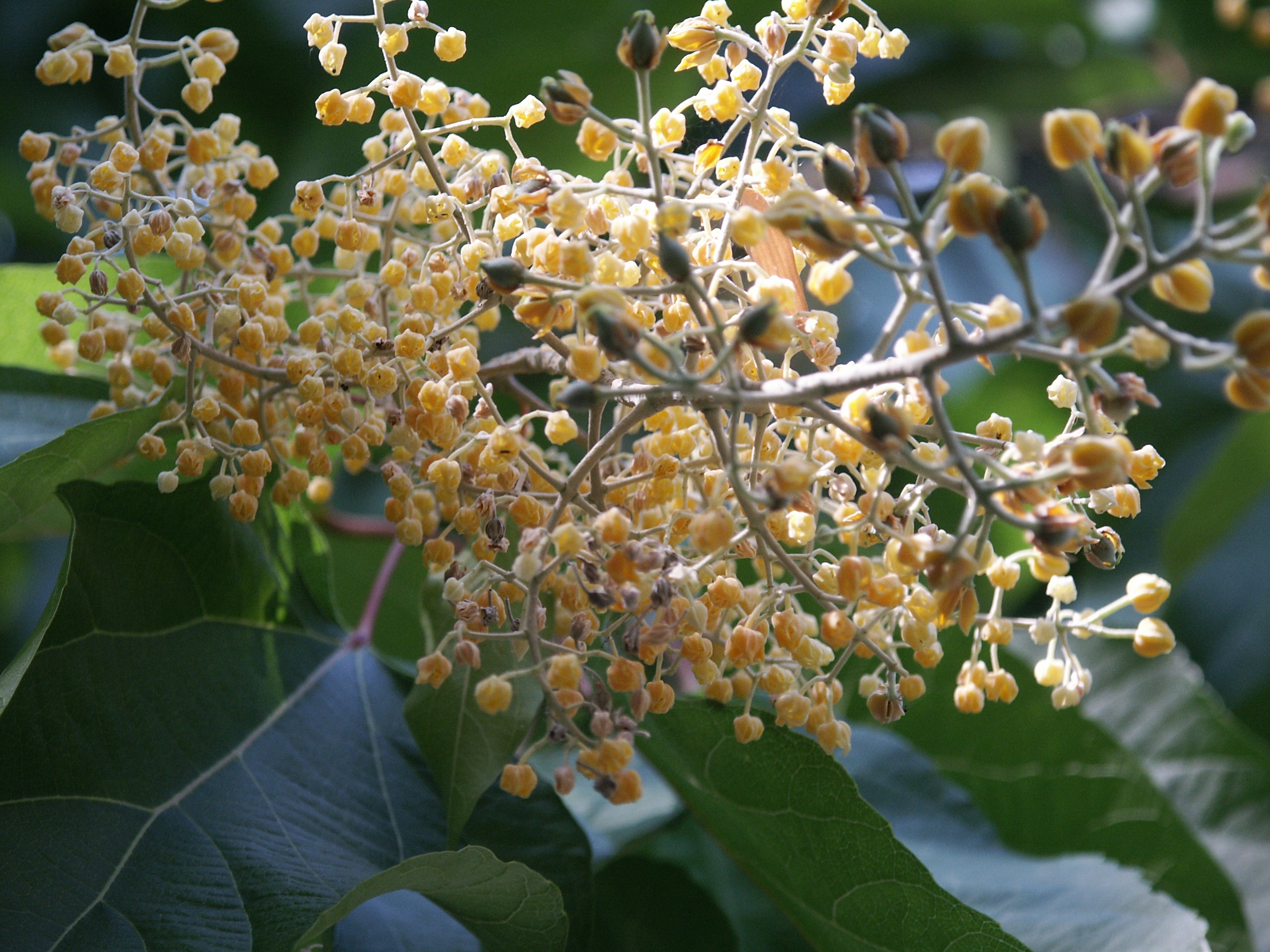
Detail of flower panicle (also Strasbourg Botanic Garden)

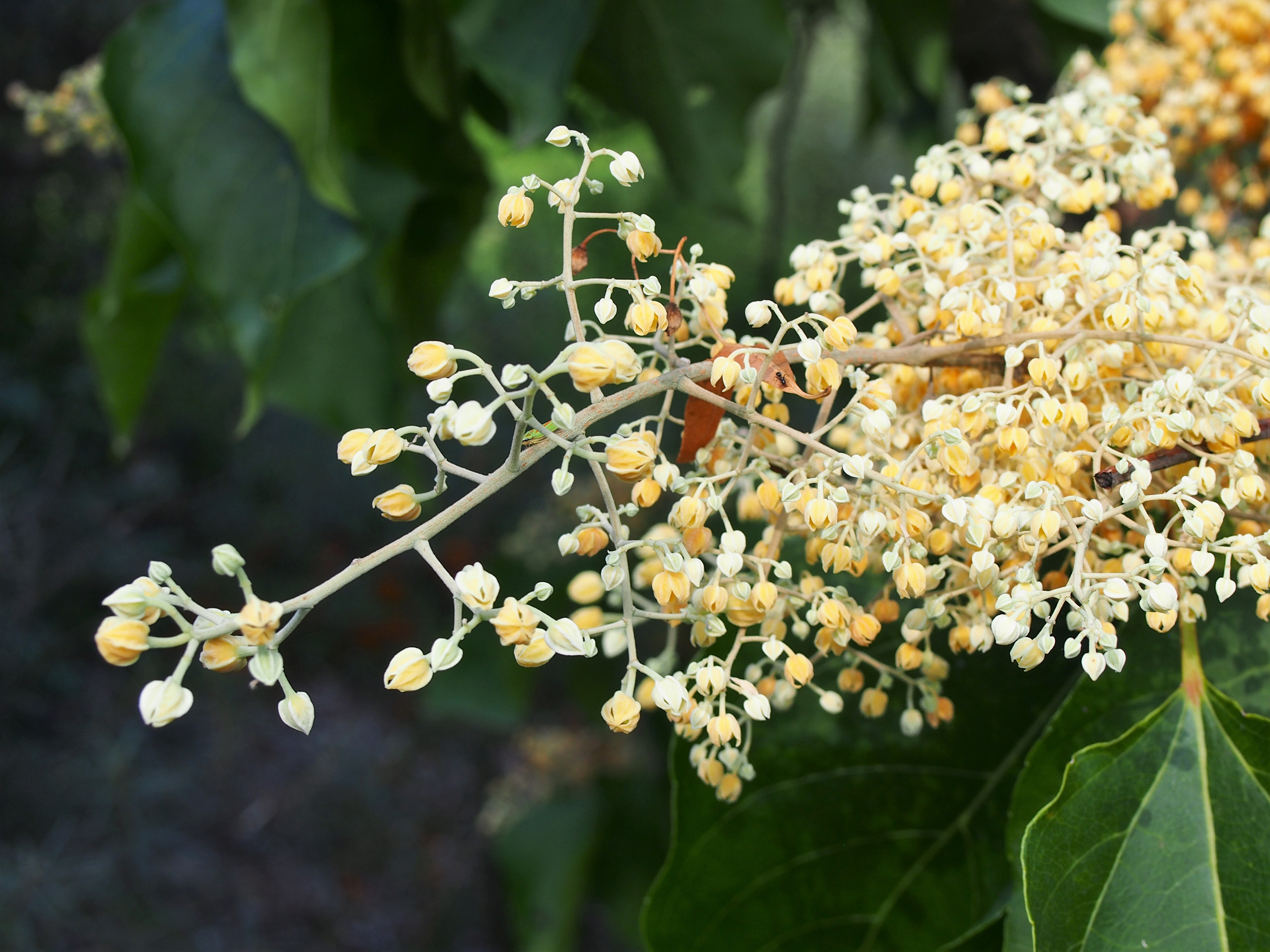
Variation in flower colour according to age, University of Wrocław Botanical Garden

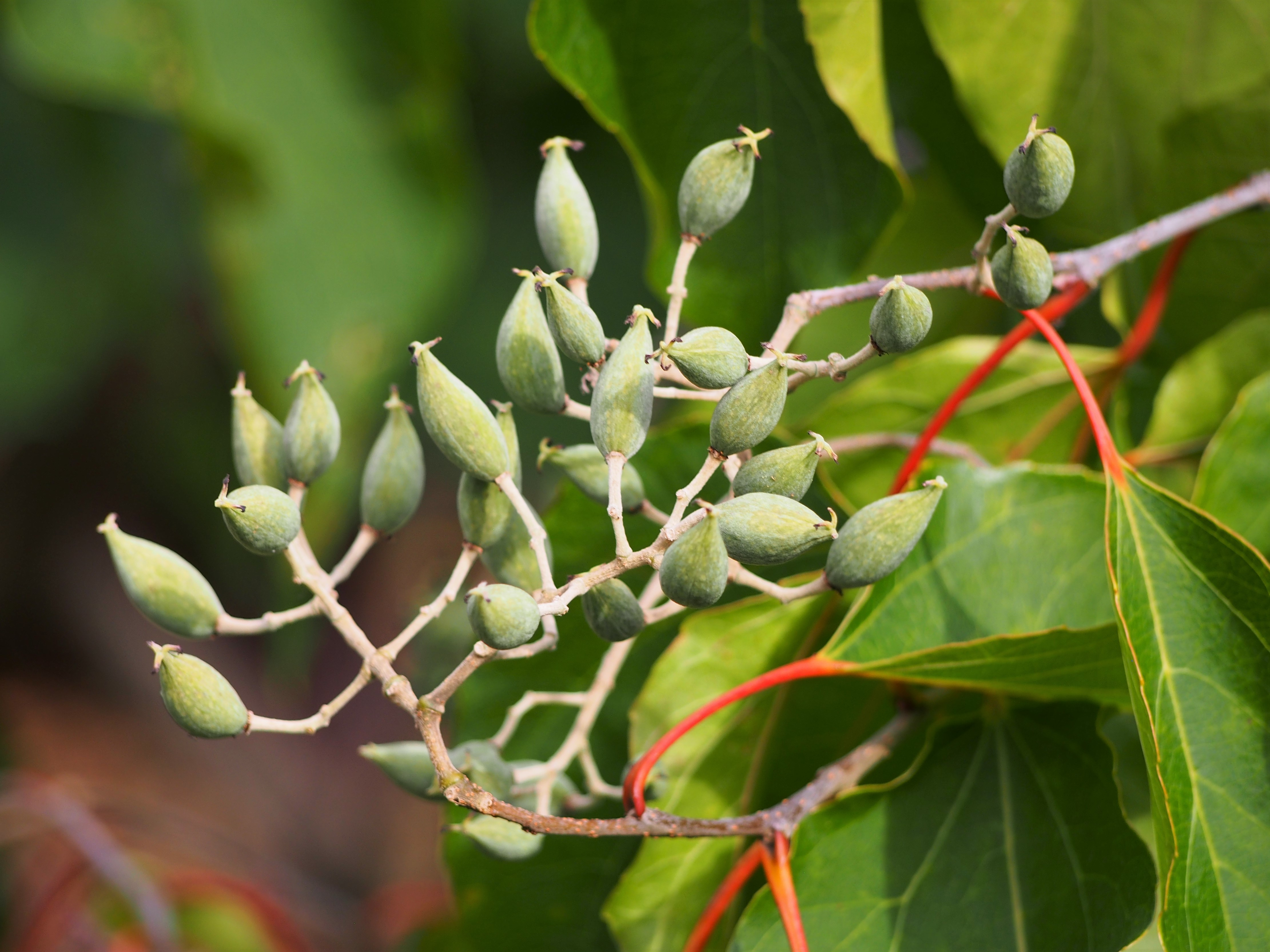
Unripe seed capsules and red petioles, also University of Wrocław Botanical Garden

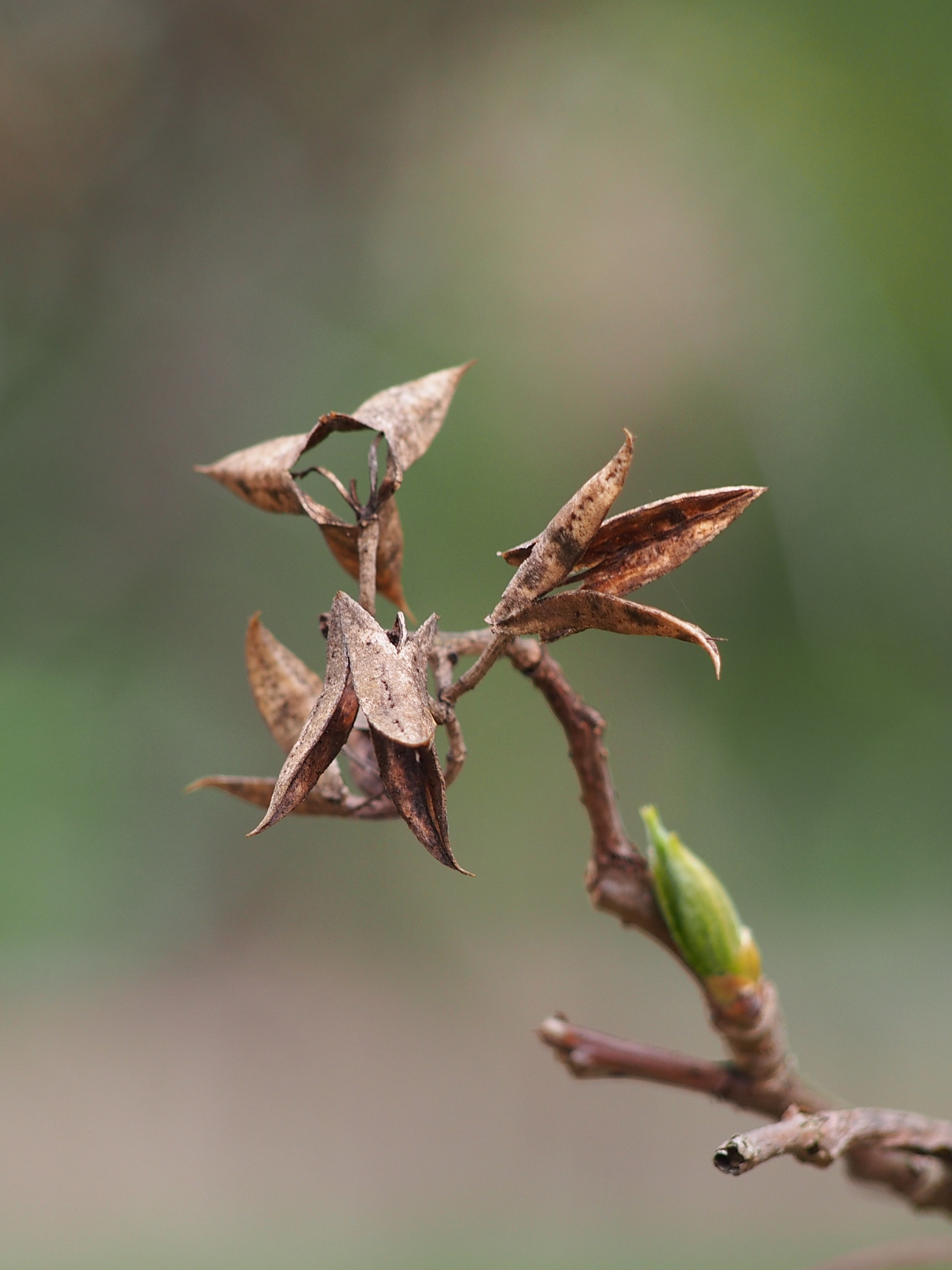
Ripe, 3-valved seed capsules, empty after wind dispersal of winged seeds (note double dehiscence - both above and below)

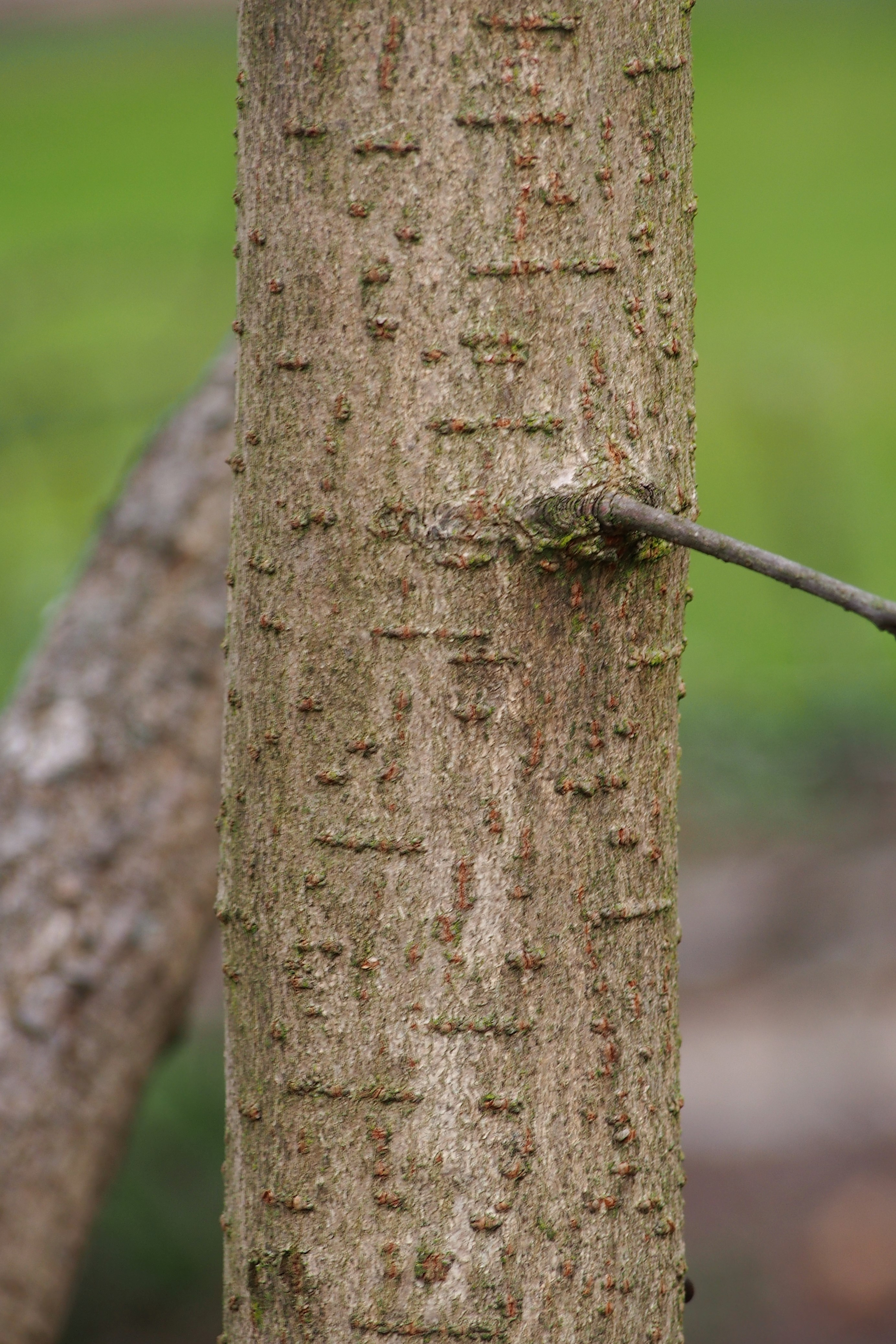
Mature bark of trunk, showing lenticels arranged in short, transverse, parallel lines

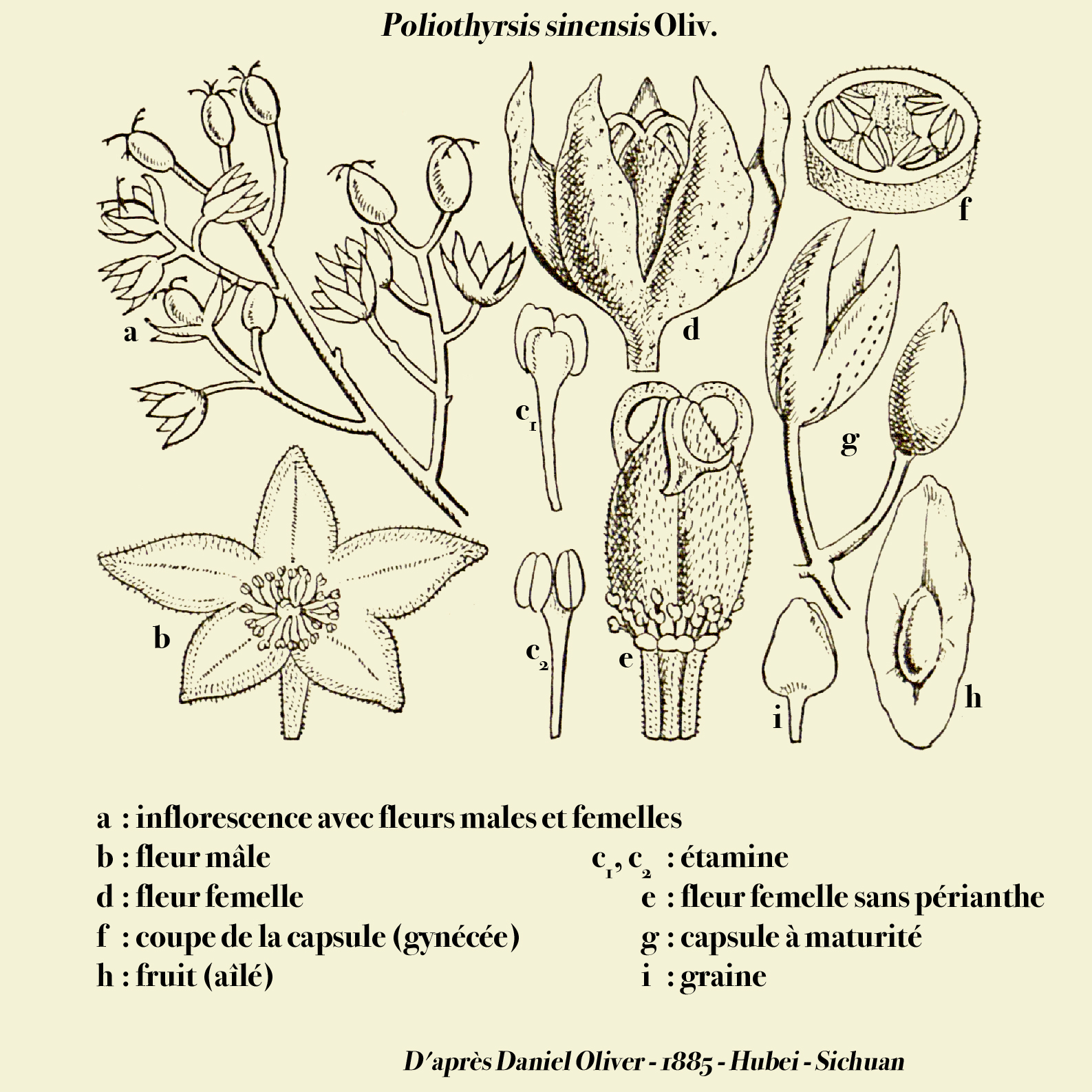
Detailed anatomy of flower, fruit and winged seed. Line drawing by Daniel Oliver (publisher of genus)
