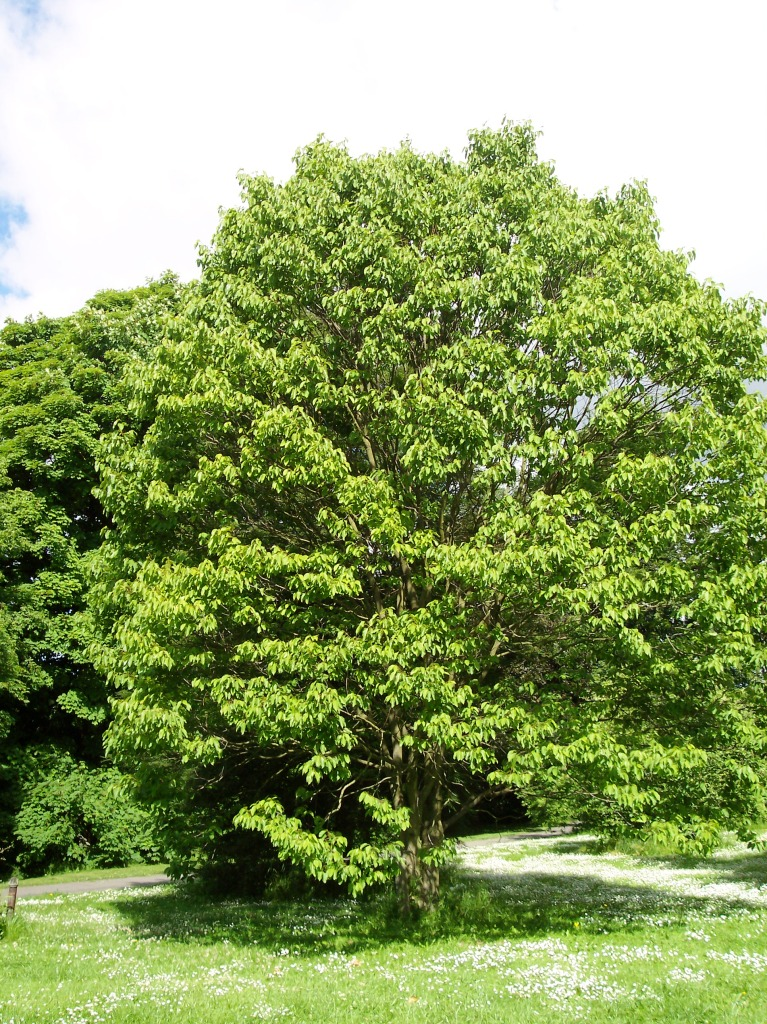
- Japanese raisin tree, Hovenia dulcis

Scientific classification
- Kingdom: Plantae
- Clade: Embryophytes
- Clade: Tracheophytes
- Clade: Angiosperms
- Clade: Eudicots
- Clade: Rosids
- Order: Rosales
- Family: Rhamnaceae
- Tribe: Paliureae
- Genus: Hovenia; Thunb.

Species
- See text

= Hovenia =

Genus of flowering plants

Hovenia is a small genus of deciduous trees or shrubs in the family Rhamnaceae. They occur naturally from India to Japan, with one species in Central America. The Japanese, or Oriental raisin tree, Hovenia dulcis, is the best known species, as it is often planted in gardens outside Asia.

== Fossil record ==
A fossil wood with features similar to those of the Oligocene Hovenia palaeodulcis from Japan is described from the late Eocene Florissant Fossil Beds National Monument, Colorado, United States. This is the first report of fossil wood of this genus in North America.

== Selected species ==
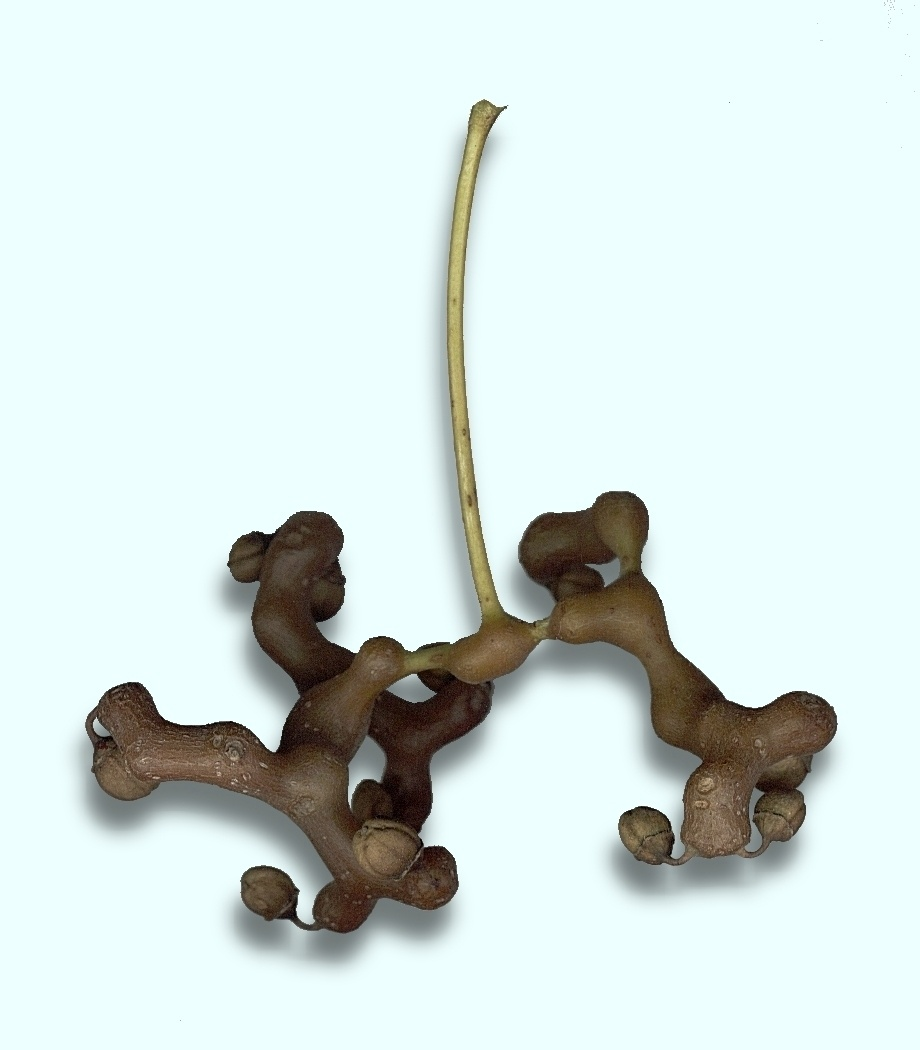
Hovenia dulcis, fruit

- Hovenia acerba

syn Hovenia kiukiangensis

- Hovenia celtidifolia
- Hovenia dulcis Thunb.

syn Hovenia inaequalis DC.

- Hovenia parviflora
- Hovenia pubescens
- Hovenia robusta
- Hovenia tomentella
- Hovenia trichocarpa
