= Astygisa =

Scientific classification
- Kingdom: Animalia
- Phylum: Arthropoda
- Class: Insecta
- Order: Lepidoptera
- Family: Geometridae
- Tribe: Caberini
- Genus: Astygisa; Walker, 1864

Genus of moths

Astygisa is a genus of moths in the family Geometridae.

== Species ==
- Astygisa circularia (Swinhoe, 1902)
- Astygisa furva (Warren, 1897)
- Astygisa metaspila Walker, 1864
- Astygisa morosa (Butler, 1881)
- Astygisa stueningi Holloway, 1993
- Astygisa subaurata Prout, 1928
- Astygisa theclaria (Walker, 1866)
- Astygisa vexillaria (Guenée, 1857)
- Astygisa waterstradti Holloway, 1993
