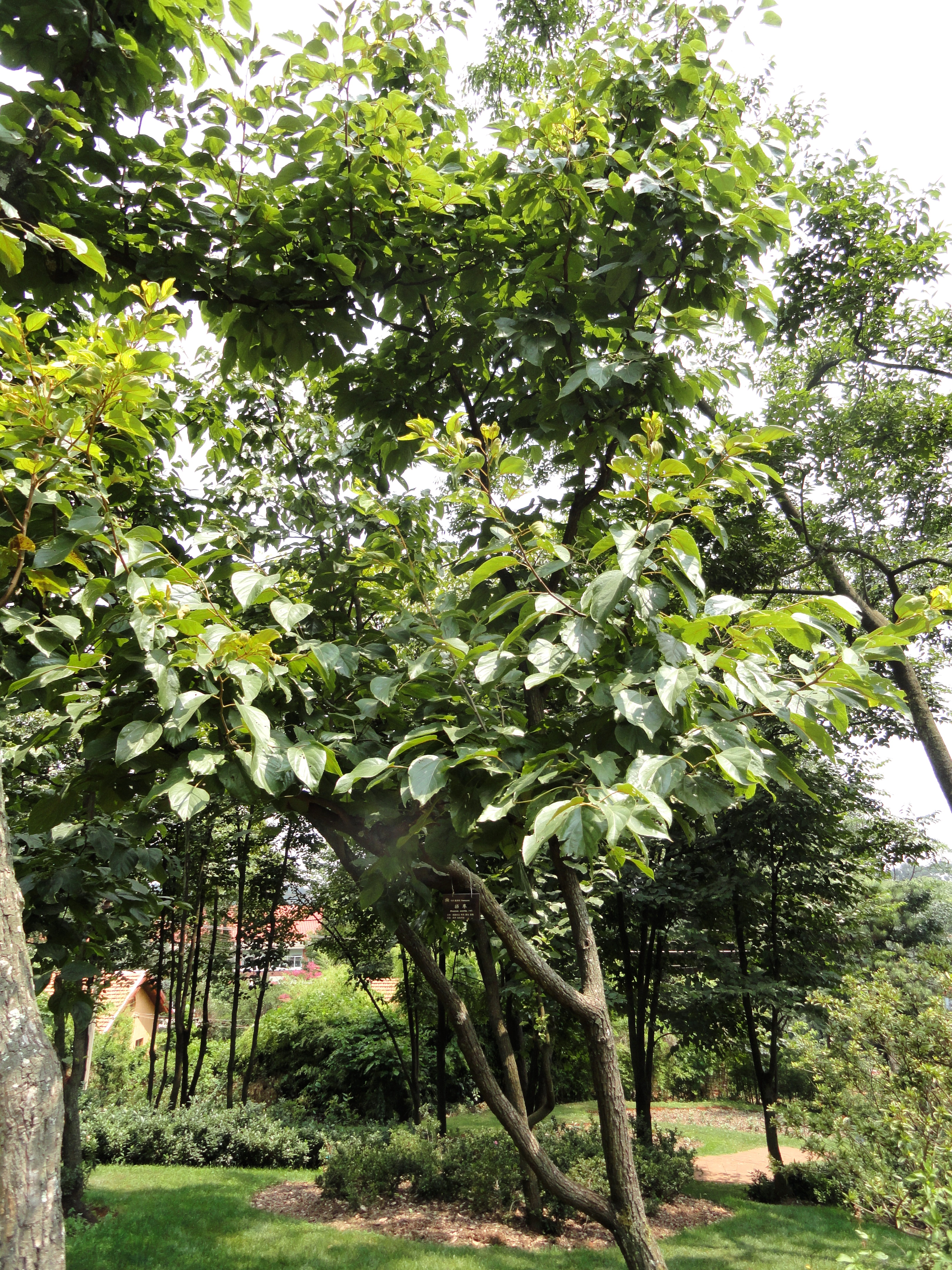
- At the Kunming Institute of Botany
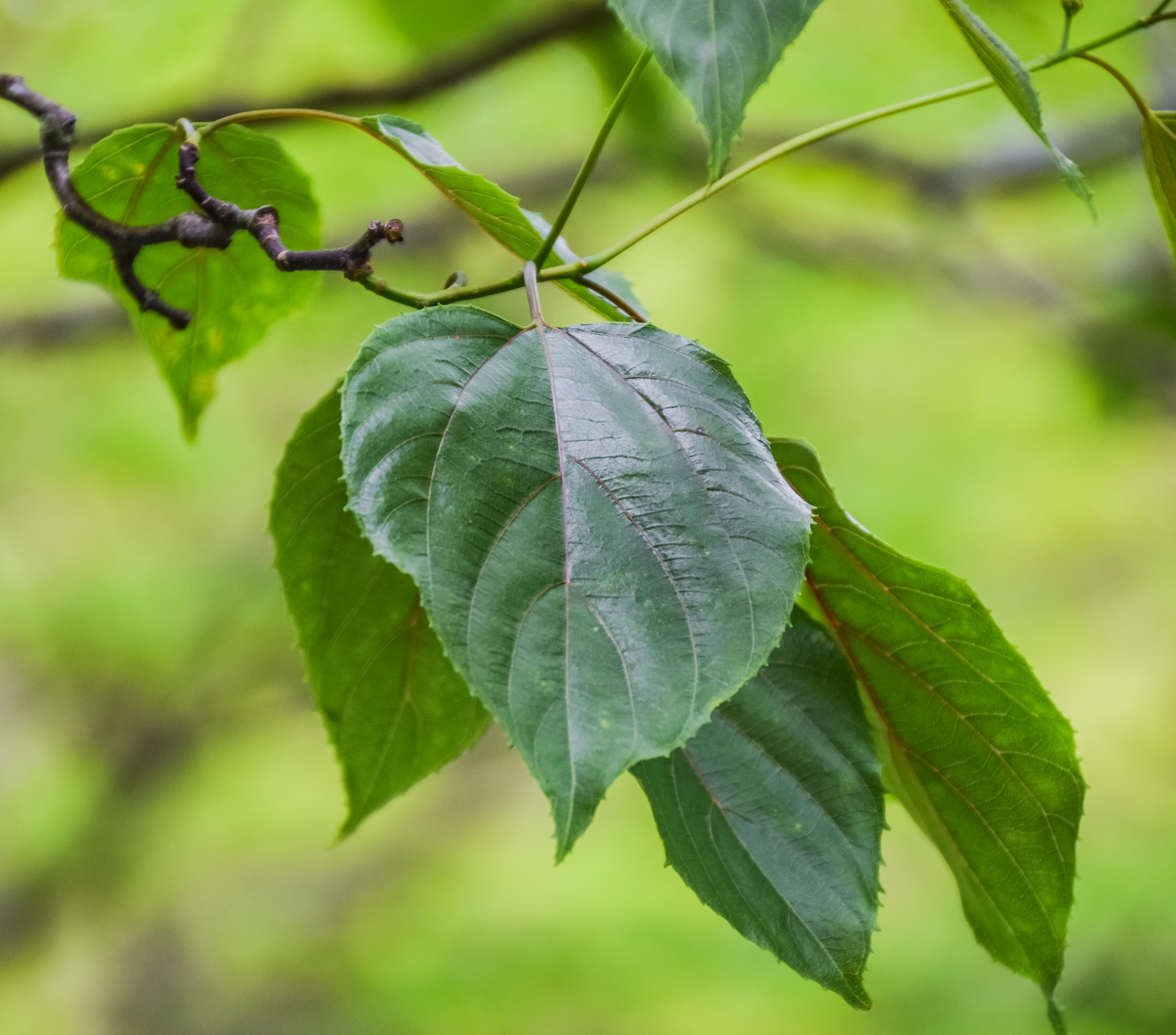
- Leaves at Hackfalls Arboretum

Conservation status
- Least Concern (IUCN 3.1)

Scientific classification
- Kingdom: Plantae
- Clade: Tracheophytes
- Clade: Angiosperms
- Clade: Eudicots
- Clade: Rosids
- Order: Rosales
- Family: Rhamnaceae
- Genus: Hovenia
- Species: H. acerba

Binomial name
- Hovenia acerba Lindl.

Synonyms
- Hovenia dulcis var. acerba (Lindl.) Sengupta & Safui; Hovenia parviflora Nakai & Kimura; Ziziphus esquirolii H.Lév.

= Hovenia acerba =

Species of plant

Hovenia acerba is a species of flowering plant in the raisin tree genus Hovenia (family Rhamnaceae), native to temperate areas of Nepal, the eastern Himalayas, Assam, Myanmar, northern Thailand, Tibet, and central and southern China. A tree reaching 25 m (82 ft), it is found at elevations up to 2,100 m (6,900 ft), in wooded and open areas, forest edges, and slopes, and it is frequently cultivated locally.

Like Hovenia dulcis it is a source of a fine hard timber, and the sweet fruit rachis is edible and is used to make a fruit wine. The seeds are used in traditional medicine. One can distinguish Hovenia acerba by its fruits, which are yellow or brownish at maturity, whereas those of H. dulcis are black. It is widely used as a street tree in southern Chinese cities.
