= Kushiro Coal Mine =

Coal mine in Japan

Coordinates: 42.9592°N 144.4213°E

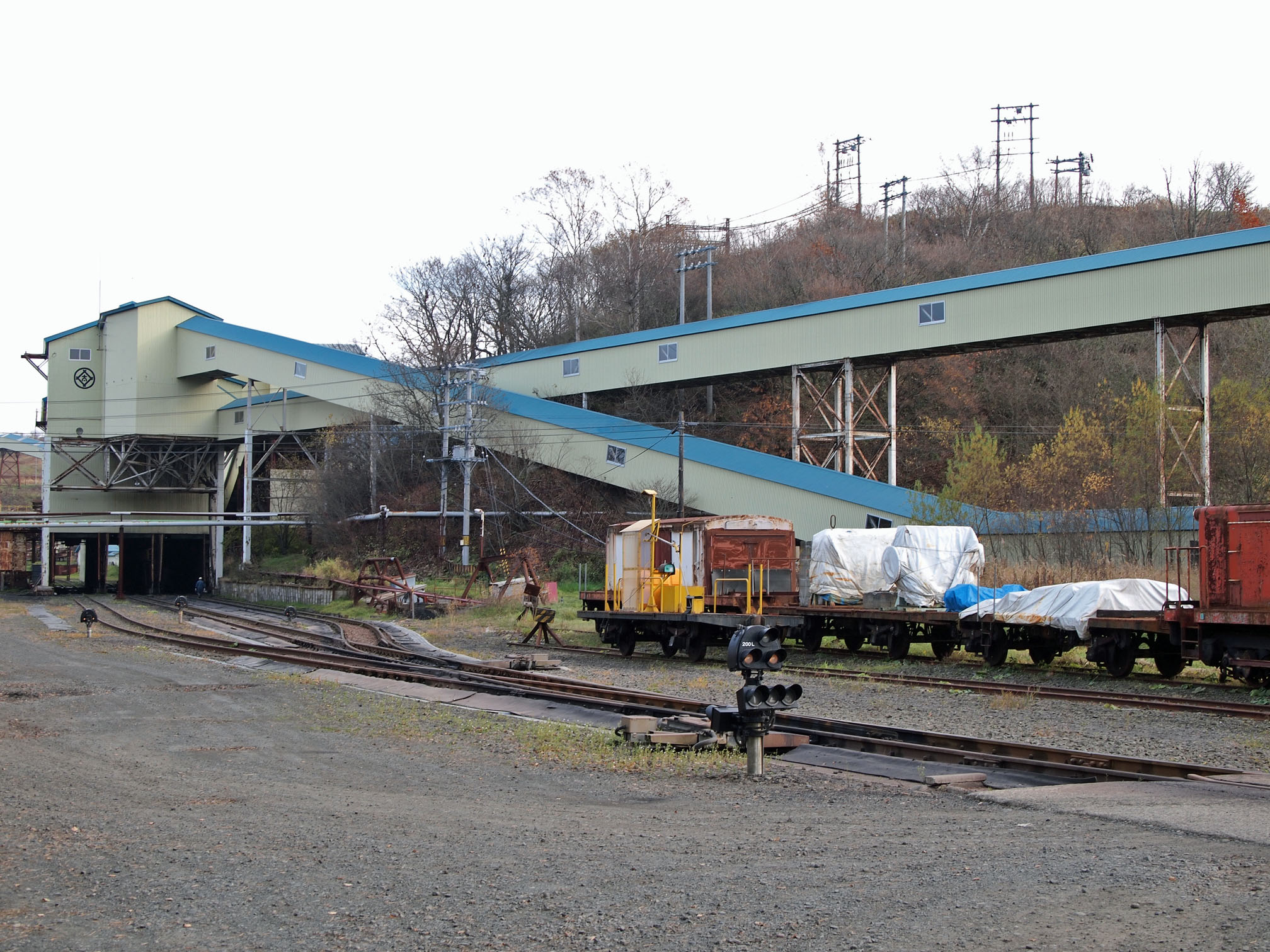
The mine in 2011.

The Kushiro Coal Mine is one of the largest coal mines in Japan, and the last remaining underground coal mine in the country. It is located on the Pacific Ocean coast of the eastern part of Hokkaido.

Kushiro Coal Mine Co., Ltd (KCM) operates the mine since 2002, when it took over the operations of the Taiheiyo Coal Mine. Output has been decreasing, from 5 million tons/year, dropping to 700,000 tons when KCM took over the mine. As output of the mine decreased, trains carrying coal from the mine were eliminated in 2019. Some output (300,000 ton) is being used at the Kushiro Thermal Power Station, but is being heavily subsidized by the government. 800 million yen, which is about two-thirds of the total project cost of 1.3 billion yen is being covered by the government, in an effort to promote coal-producing area through the Hokkaido Coal-Producing Area Promotion Centre. Local residents are of mixed opinion about the mine, questioning its reduced output and need for the coal.

The mine has seen a renaissance since the 2011 Fukushima Daiichi nuclear disaster, as the government remained unsure about the future of nuclear power in the country. Building the thermal power plant designed to use coal from the mine is expected to keep the mine in operation for a few decades, but not at full capacity. Managers at the mine concede "that its continued existence is largely an anachronism, not indicative of any longer-term future for coal in this country or for the East Asian region in general." In particular, production costs of coal from the mine cannot compete with large open pit operations in Australasia or elsewhere in Asia.

== Description and history ==
The local coalfield was formed around 38 million years ago, from the rich peatlands around the area. The field has more than 10 seams capable of being mined, some up to 5 meters thick. Coal mining has been an important part of the local economy since large scale extraction began in 1920. At one time, the local mine was the largest in Japan.

The first mine in the area, established as the Taiheiyo Coalmine Co. Ltd., opened in 1920; "Taiheiyo" meaning "Pacific Ocean" in the Japanese language, as the mine was built under the Ocean seabed. The mine operated until 2002 when it closed under the government's new coal policy. Until the closure in 2002, the mine was operated by a joint union of administrative staff and mine workers, first set up in 1946. In 2002, the Kushiro Coalmine Co. Ltd. was established to take over the operations on the site. Since the early days of the mine, mechanization was deemed essential on the site, as it was impossible to build a vertical mine shaft, given the undersea location.

The Taiheiyo Coalmine Co was known for the modernization of its management structure over a period of 10 years in the 1960s. "The measures introduced by Taiheiyo in the 1960s dramatically changed key areas of corporate management, such as employee status, wages, labor-management relations, housing support and employee welfare." These changes helped the mine remain competitive and were in line with broader trends in Japanese industry of the time.

As of the 1990s, the mine produced 25% of all domestic coal used by power stations in the country. At that time, 80% of the mine's production was done by mechanized longwall mining, used since 1967. Paleogene bituminous coal is extracted from under the ocean floor at the site.

The current mine is composed of rusting silos and long corrugated steel structures along the north side of the property. These structures house conveyor belts carrying coal to be processed and loaded onto waiting trucks. Located along the south side of the mine are administrative buildings and entrances to the subterranean, undersea shafts. Residential and commercial districts are also found in the area, some located on top of the mine itself.

Coalbed methane from the mine has been captured and refined using pressure swing adsorption since 2017, under joint project between the Mine and Osaka Gas.

The mine has been involved in technical and environmental information sharing with other Asian coal-mining countries and has operated human capital exchange programs to support these efforts.

== Earthquake prediction ==
Water drainage from the mine has been shown to help predict earthquakes in the area. Water drainage from the Mine decreased on the day of all M ≥ 7.5 earthquakes with an epicenter of 300 km from the mine and increased thereafter. Scientists are hopeful that these findings can help predict “pre- and post-seismic rockmass behaviors and contribute for progress in earthquake prediction in future.”

== Paleontology of the site ==
Study of the paleontology of the site has been ongoing since at least the 1950s. A 1952 study of tree pollens found in the coal seam indicated that sequoia was the most abundant and Pinus, Alnus, Ericacea and Carpinus pollens were also abundant.

Studies in the 1980s showed the presence of three different varieties of Corbicula molluscs in the sediment in the coal seams.
