= Nemuro Belt =

The Nemuro Belt (根室帯, Nemuro-tai) is the easternmost tectonic unit or terrane of Hokkaidō, Japan. The boundary with the Tokoro Belt to the west is marked by the Abashiri Tectonic Line (網走構造線), which runs from the area of Abashiri on the north coast to that of Urahoro on the south coast, the southern portion coinciding with the Urahoro Fault (浦幌断層). The belt is composed of volcanogenic sediments and volcanic rocks — for the most part, basalt and andesites; these may be remnants of an island arc that took shape over an "east or southeast dipping intraoceanic subduction zone". As dated by potassium–argon geochronology and radiolarians, the oldest sequences are Campanian‐Maastrichtian. The belt has rotated counterclockwise some 15–25° since the Late Cretaceous.

Running roughly east to west, the primary rock strata of the Nemuro Belt are the Late Cretaceous (Campanian) to early Palaeogene (Palaeocene and, in places, Eocene) deposits of the Nemuro Group (根室層群), which occur in the Shiranuka Hills and extend along the south coast from Kushiro and the Nemuro Peninsula into the South Kurils, to Zelyony (Shibotsu) and Shikotan, and perhaps as far as the submarine Vityaz Ridge. The Nemuro Group is in part overlain by the Middle Eocene Urahoro Group (浦幌層群), which is in turn overlain by the Upper Eocene to Lower Oligocene Onbetsu Group (音別層群).

== Nemuro Group ==
The group includes the following formations, in ascending order:

- Nokkamappu Formation (ノッカマップ層)
- Ōtamura Formation (太田村層)
- Monshizu Formation (門静層)
- Oborogawa Formation (尾幌川層)
- Hamanaka Formation (浜中層)
- Akkeshi Formation (厚岸層)
- Tokotan Formation (床潭層)
- Kiritappu Formation (霧多布層)

== Urahoro Group ==
The group includes the following formations, in ascending order:

- Beppo Formation (別保層)
- Harutori Formation (春採層)
- Tenneru Formation (天寧層)
- Yūbetsu Formation (雄別層)
- Shitakara Formation (舌辛層)
- Shakubetsu Formation (尺別層)

At the western end, the Rushin Formation (留真層) correlates with the Beppo, Harutori, and Tenneru Formations.
