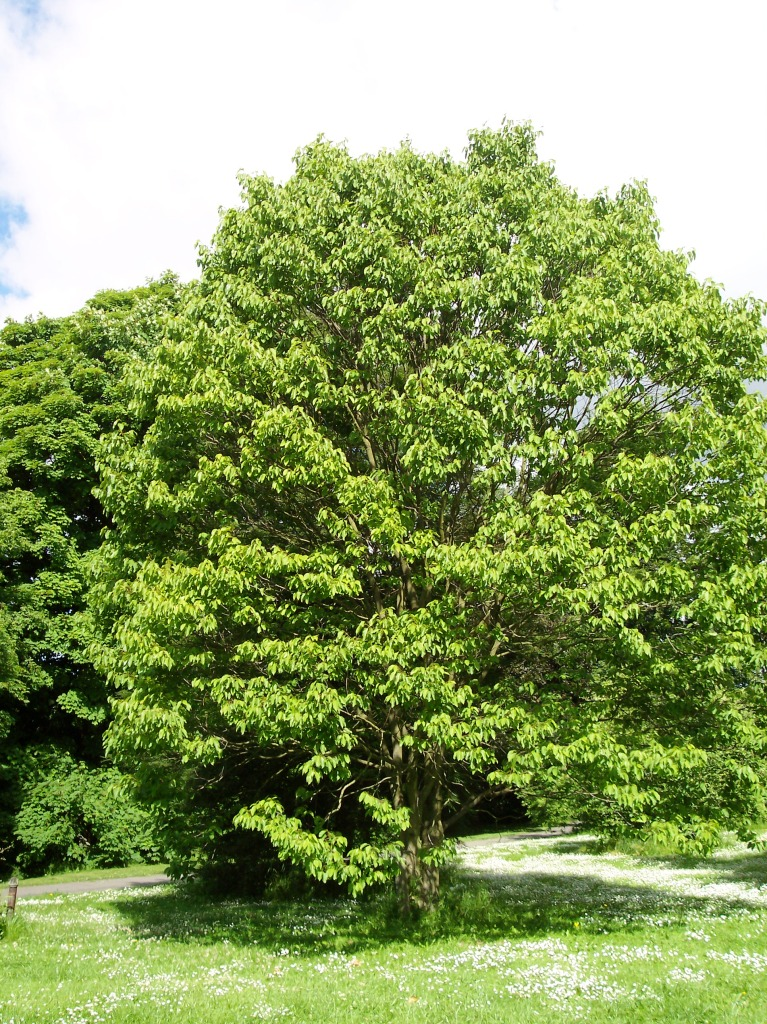

Conservation status
- Least Concern (IUCN 3.1)

Scientific classification
- Kingdom: Plantae
- Clade: Tracheophytes
- Clade: Angiosperms
- Clade: Eudicots
- Clade: Rosids
- Order: Rosales
- Family: Rhamnaceae
- Genus: Hovenia
- Species: H. dulcis

Binomial name
- Hovenia dulcis Thunb.

Synonyms
- Hovenia dulcis f. deviata Honda; Hovenia dulcis var. dulcis; Hovenia dulcis var. glabra Makino; Hovenia dulcis var. koreana Nakai ex Y.Kimura; Hovenia dulcis var. latifolia Nakai ex Y.Kimura; Hovenia dulcis f. latifolia (Nakai ex Y.Kimura) H.Hara

= Hovenia dulcis =

Species of flowering plant

Hovenia dulcis, or the oriental raisin tree, is a hardy tree found in Asia, from Eastern China (萬壽果; pinyin: wànshòuguǒ) and Korea (헛개나무, heotgae namu) to the Himalayas (up to altitudes of 2,000 m), growing preferably in a sunny position on moist sandy or loamy soils. The tree known for its health benefits when consumed in tea, introduced as an ornamental tree to several countries, also bears edible fruit. It is considered to be one of the most pervasive invaders in Brazilian subtropical forests.

== Description ==
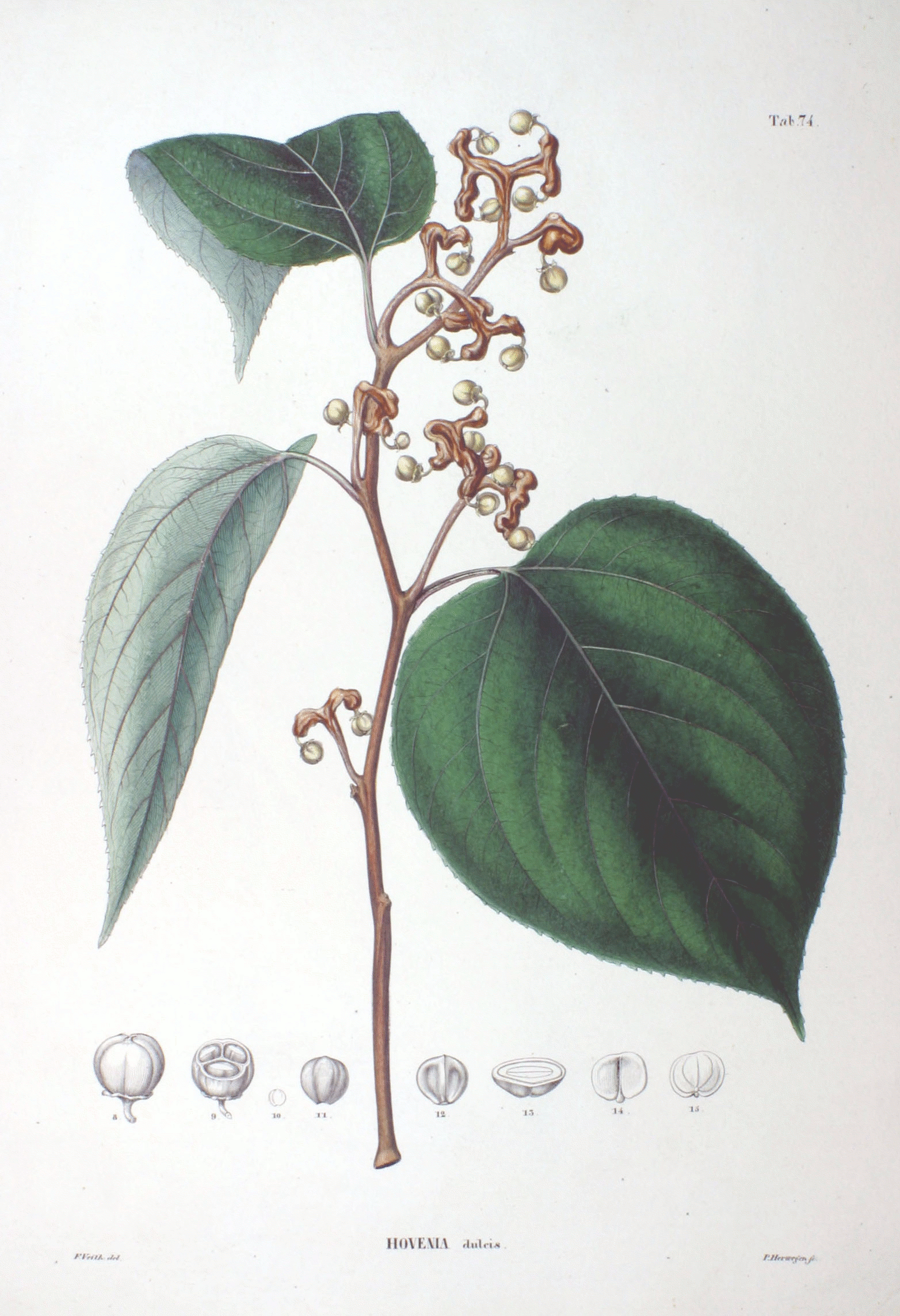
Hovenia dulcis

Tree, rarely a shrub, deciduous, to 10–30 m tall. Branchlets brown or black-purple, glabrous, with inconspicuous lenticels. The glossy leaves are large and pointed. The trees bear clusters of small cream-coloured hermaphroditic flowers in July. The drupes appear at the ends of an edible rachis (fleshy fruit stalk), which is a type of accessory fruit.

== Uses ==
The fleshy rachis of the infructescence is sweet, fragrant and is edible raw or cooked. Dried, they look and taste like raisins. An extract of the seeds, bough, and young leaves can be used as a substitute for honey and is used for making wine and candy.

An extract of the leaves contains hodulcine, a glycoside which exhibits an anti-sweet activity.

The timber is fine and hard and is used for building construction and fine furniture.

Hovenia dulcis is a natural source for dihydromyricetin, a flavonoid with antioxidant properties and is primarily found in the tree's leaves, stems, and bark. It has been used in traditional Chinese, Korean, and Japanese medicines to treat fever, parasitic infection, as a laxative, and a treatment of liver diseases, and as a hangover treatment. It is also used as medicine for preventing and treating chronic diseases as well as skincare products for its ability to protect skin from UV-induced damage and aging.

=== Reforestation ===
In Thailand Hovenia dulcis is relatively rare, typically found in the stream-irrigated valleys of primary lower mountain evergreen forest located between 1,075 and 1,250 metres above sea level. However, it is one of 30 potential species identified as a substitute for Eucalyptus spp., commonly planted for reforestation, that would meet the demand for rapid growth while not disturbing the ecological balance.

In Thailand Hovenia dulcis grows at roughly the same rate as eucalyptus, reaching six metres in height within three years. One major asset is that the growth form of the tree allows other species to regenerate nearby. Furthermore, the tree is known to attract several varieties both of birds and of mammals which feed on the seeds and fruit. As well as promoting faunal diversity, this process assists in improving soil fertility through humification.

== Synonyms ==
- Hovenia inequalis – DC.

== See also ==
- Exocarpos cupressiformis

== Gallery ==
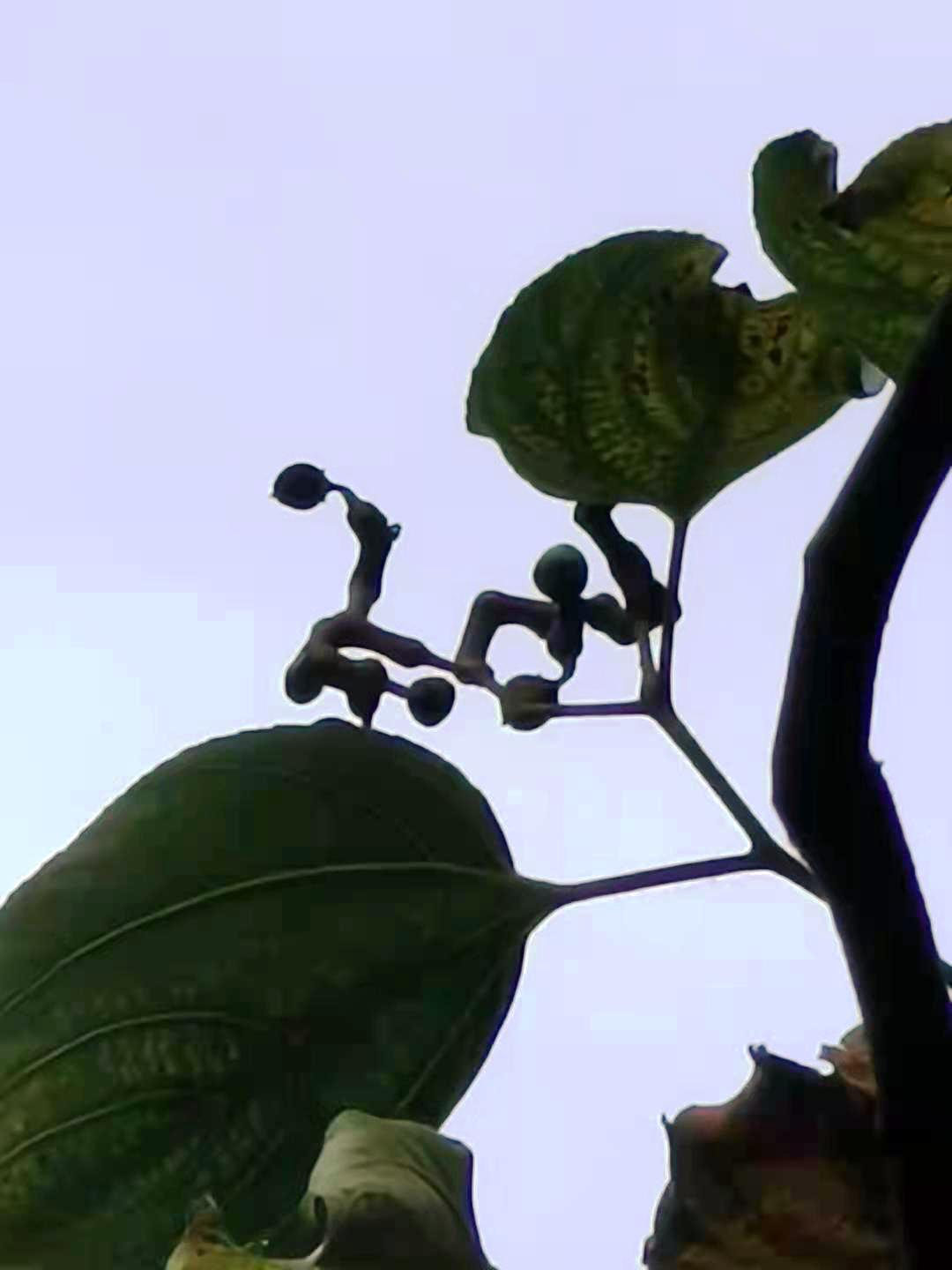

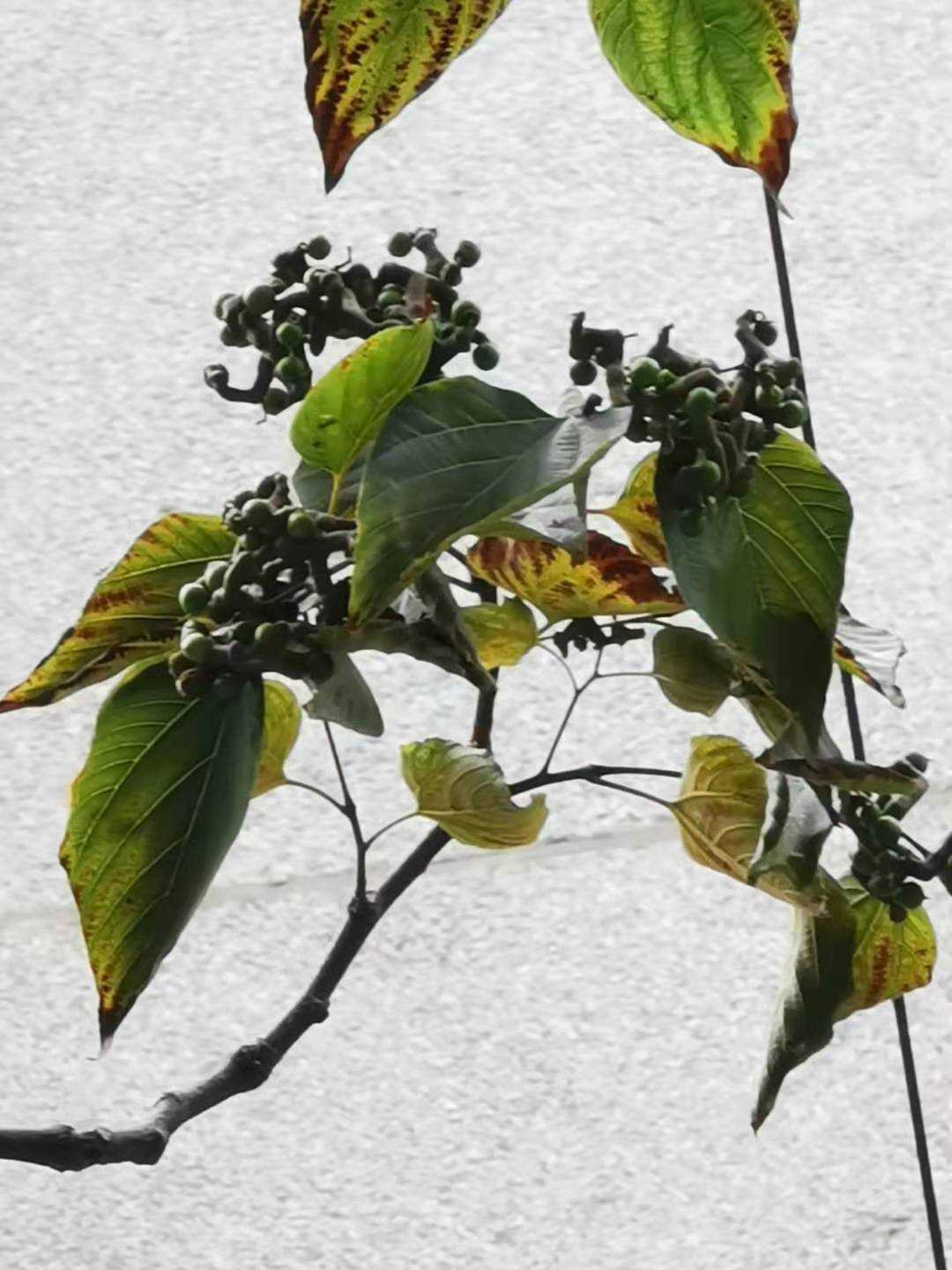

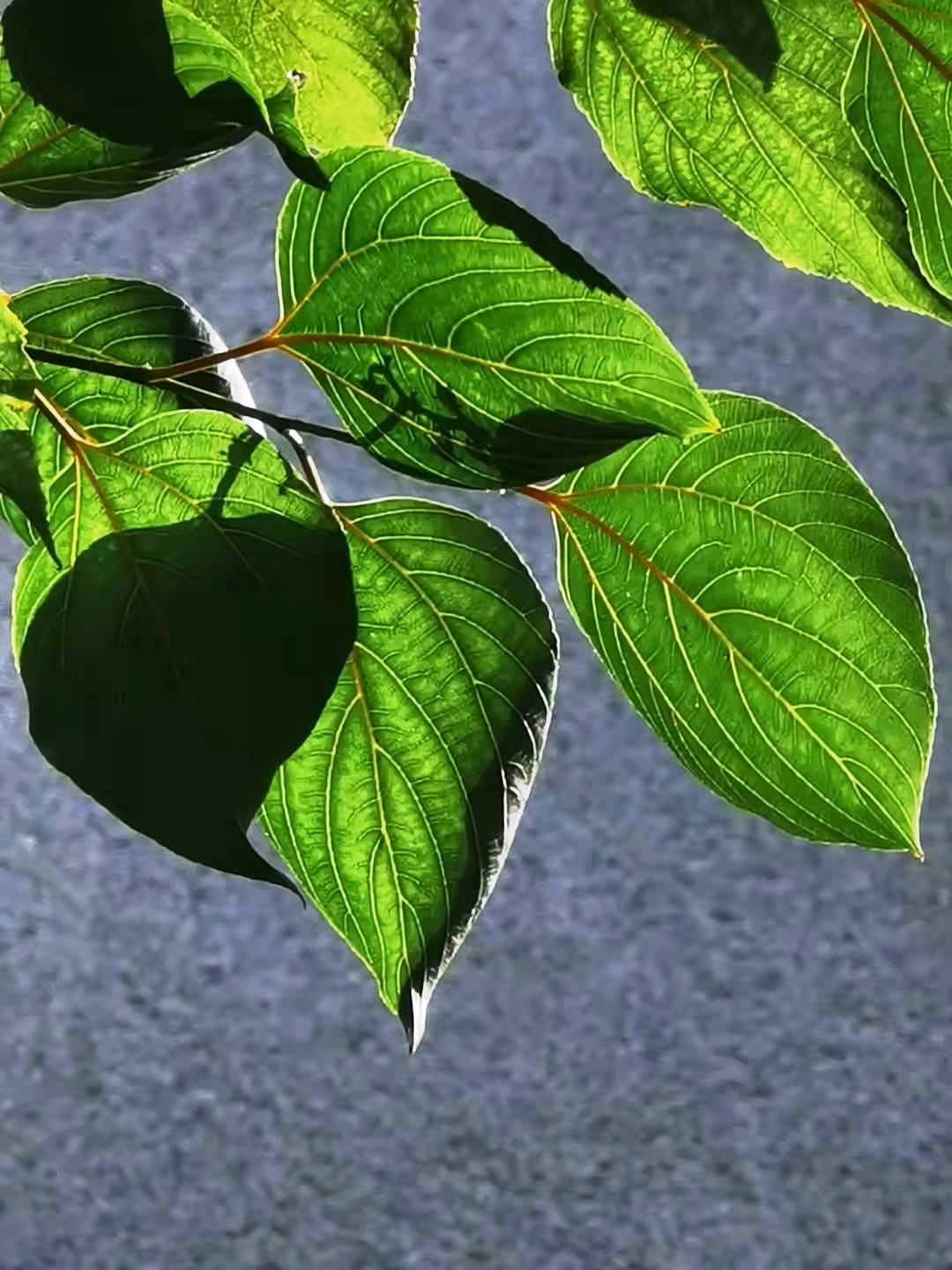

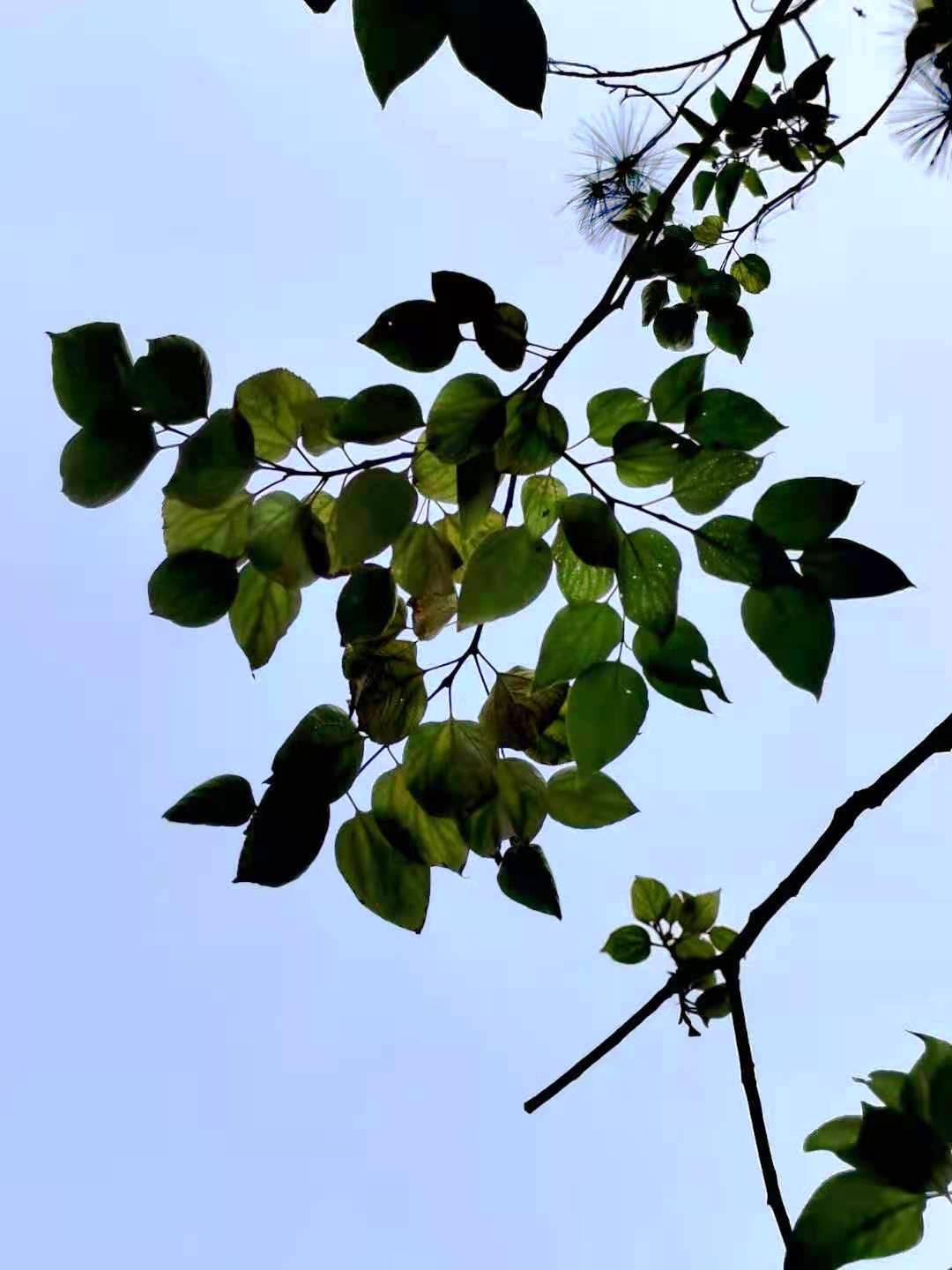

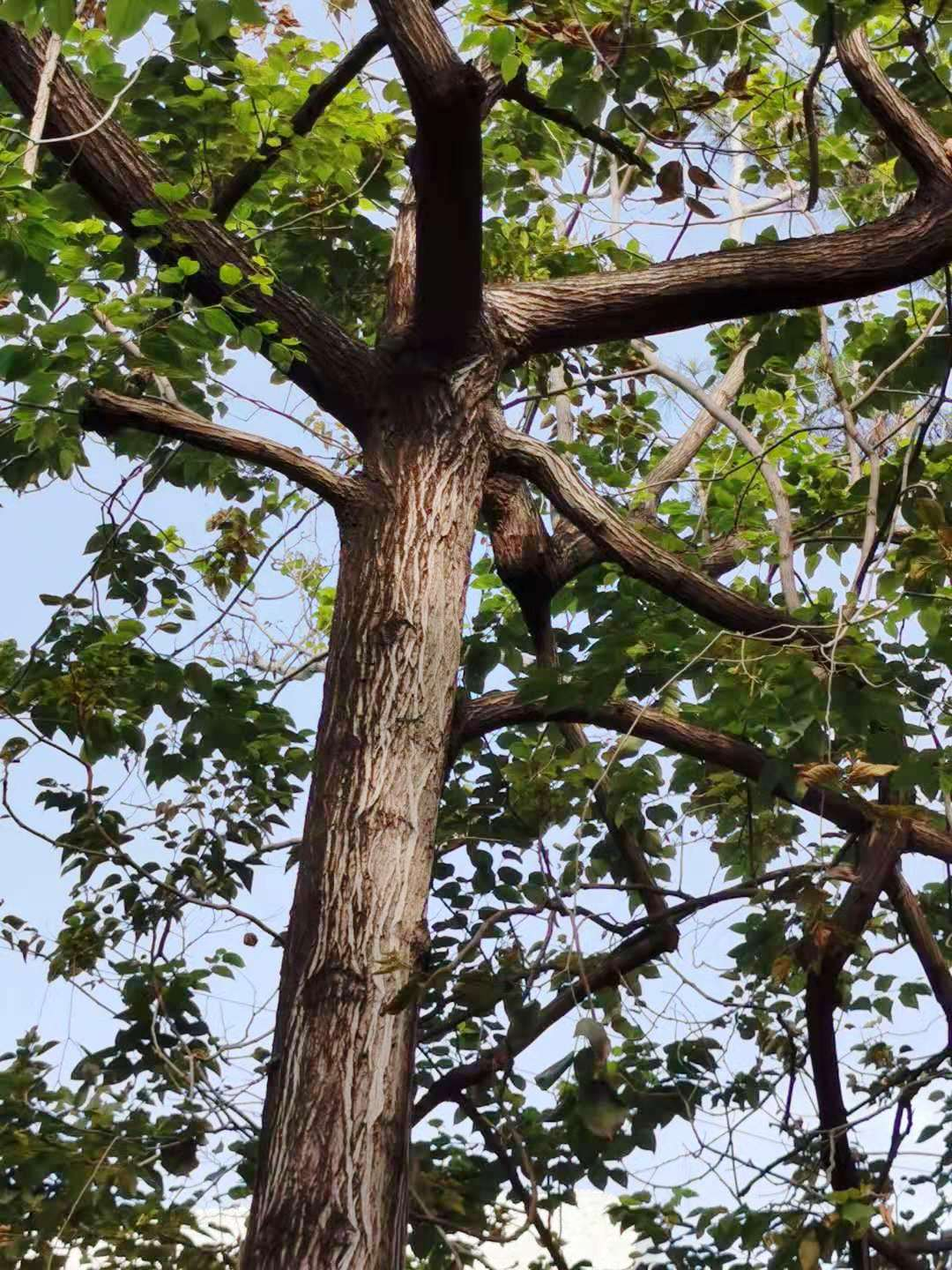

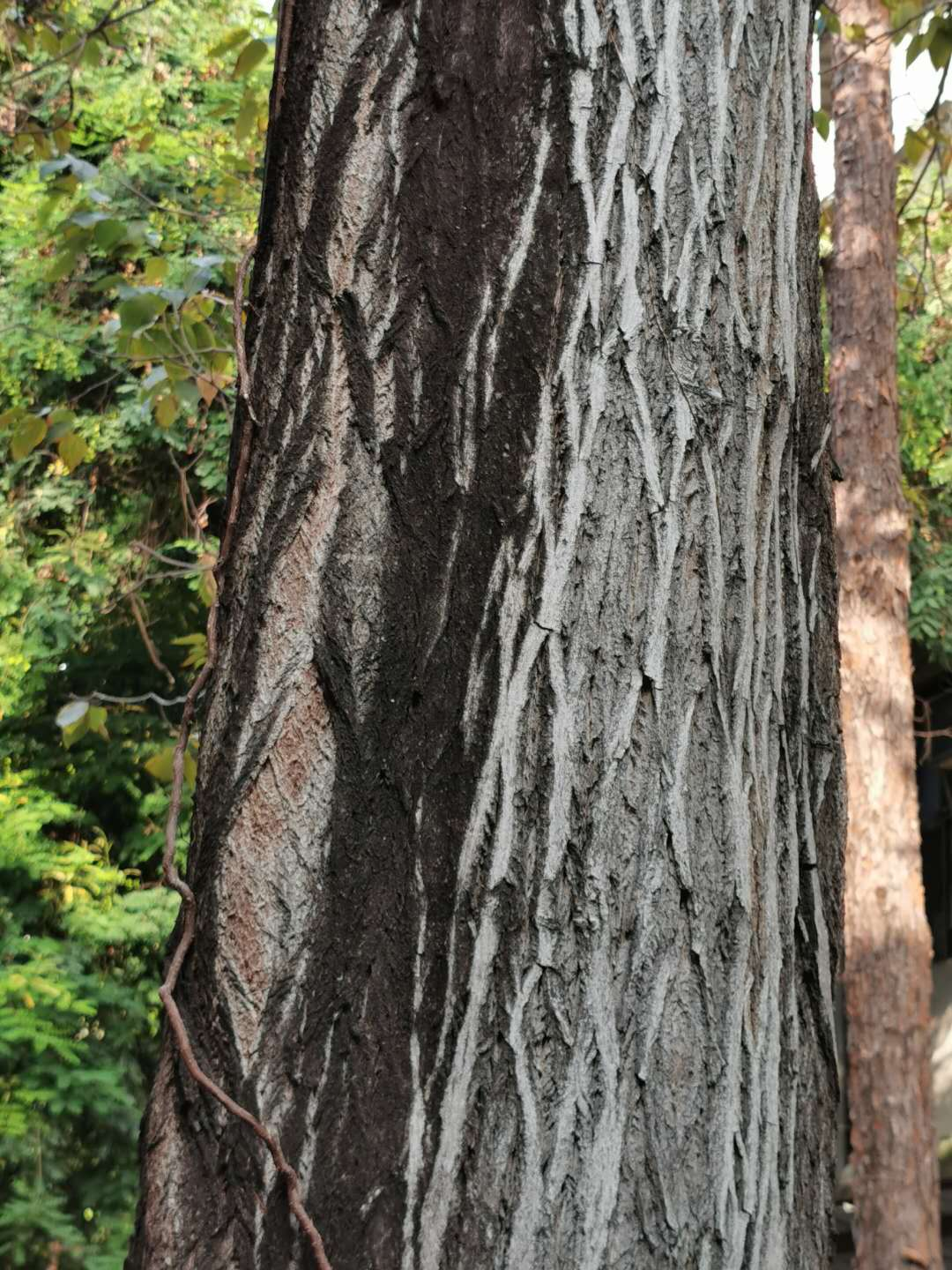
