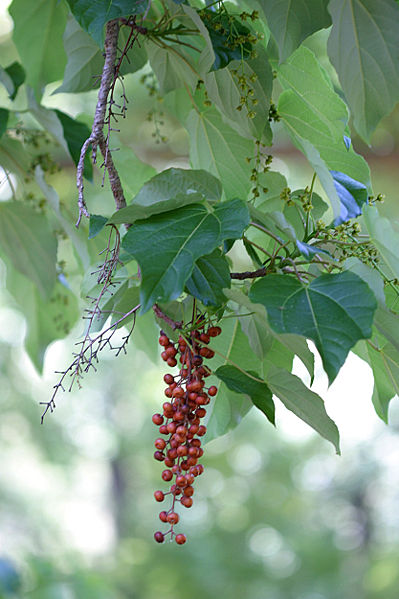
- Idesia polycarpa leaves and fruit

Scientific classification
- Kingdom: Plantae
- Clade: Tracheophytes
- Clade: Angiosperms
- Clade: Eudicots
- Clade: Rosids
- Order: Malpighiales
- Family: Salicaceae
- Subfamily: Salicoideae
- Tribe: Saliceae
- Genus: Idesia; Maxim.
- Species: I. polycarpa

Binomial name
- Idesia polycarpa Maxim.

Synonyms
- Cathayeia Ohwi

= Idesia =

Genus of trees

Idesia as established by Scopoli is a suppressed name; see Diospyros.

Idesia is a genus of flowering plants in the family Salicaceae (formerly placed in the family Flacourtiaceae), comprising the single species Idesia polycarpa. It is native to eastern Asia in China, Japan, Korea, and Taiwan.

It is a medium-sized deciduous tree reaching a height of 8–21 m, with a trunk up to 50 cm diameter with smooth greyish-green bark. The shoots are greyish-brown, stout, with a thick pith core. The leaves are large, heart-shaped, 8–20 cm long and 7–20 cm broad, with a red 4–30 cm petiole bearing two or more glands; the leaves are dark green above, glaucous below, and have a coarsely serrated margin. The flowers are small, yellowish green, fragrant, and born in panicles 13–30 cm long. It is dioecious with male and female flowers on separate trees; the male flowers are 12–16 mm diameter, the female flowers 9 mm diameter. The fruit is a berry 5–10 mm diameter, ripening orange to dark purple-red, containing several 2–3 mm brown seeds, and often persisting until the following spring.

== Cultivation and uses ==
The fruit is edible either raw or cooked.

The species is occasionally grown as an ornamental tree in other temperate regions including Europe.

== Gallery ==
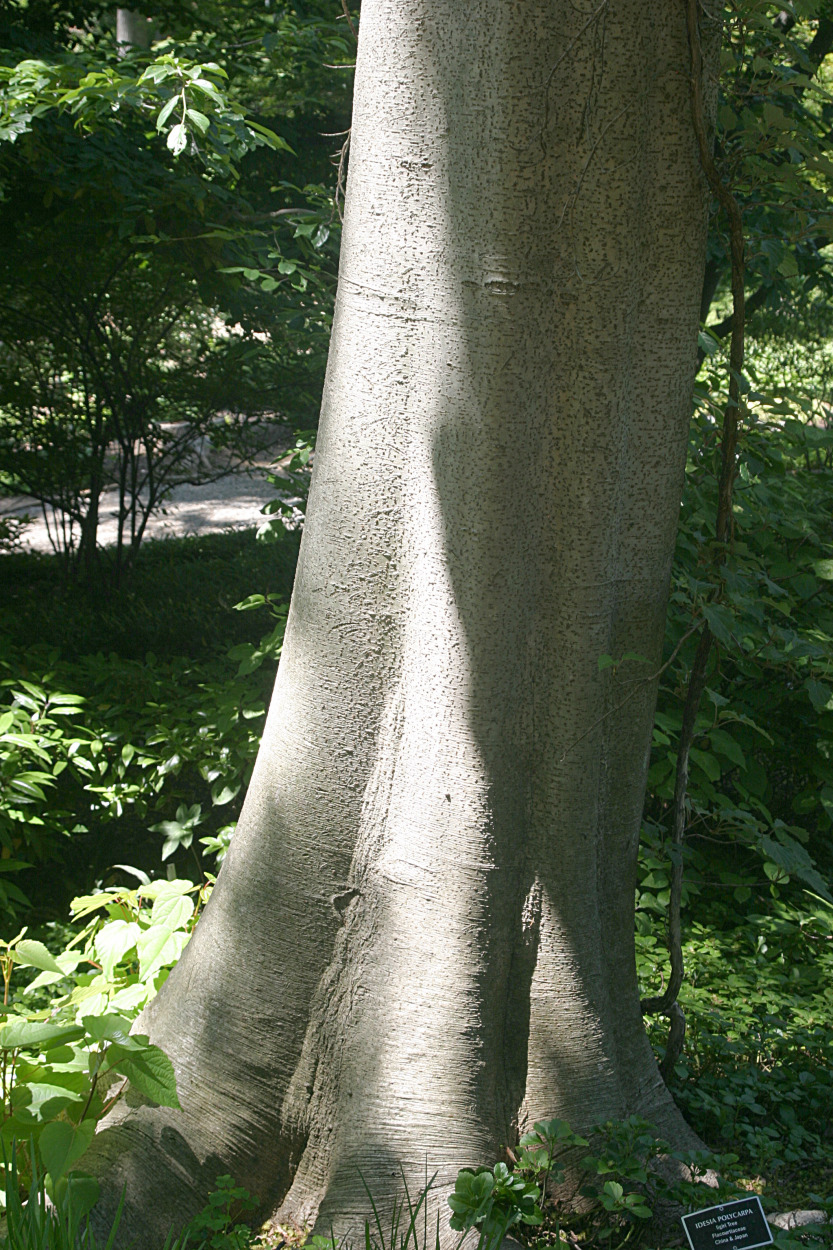
Trunk

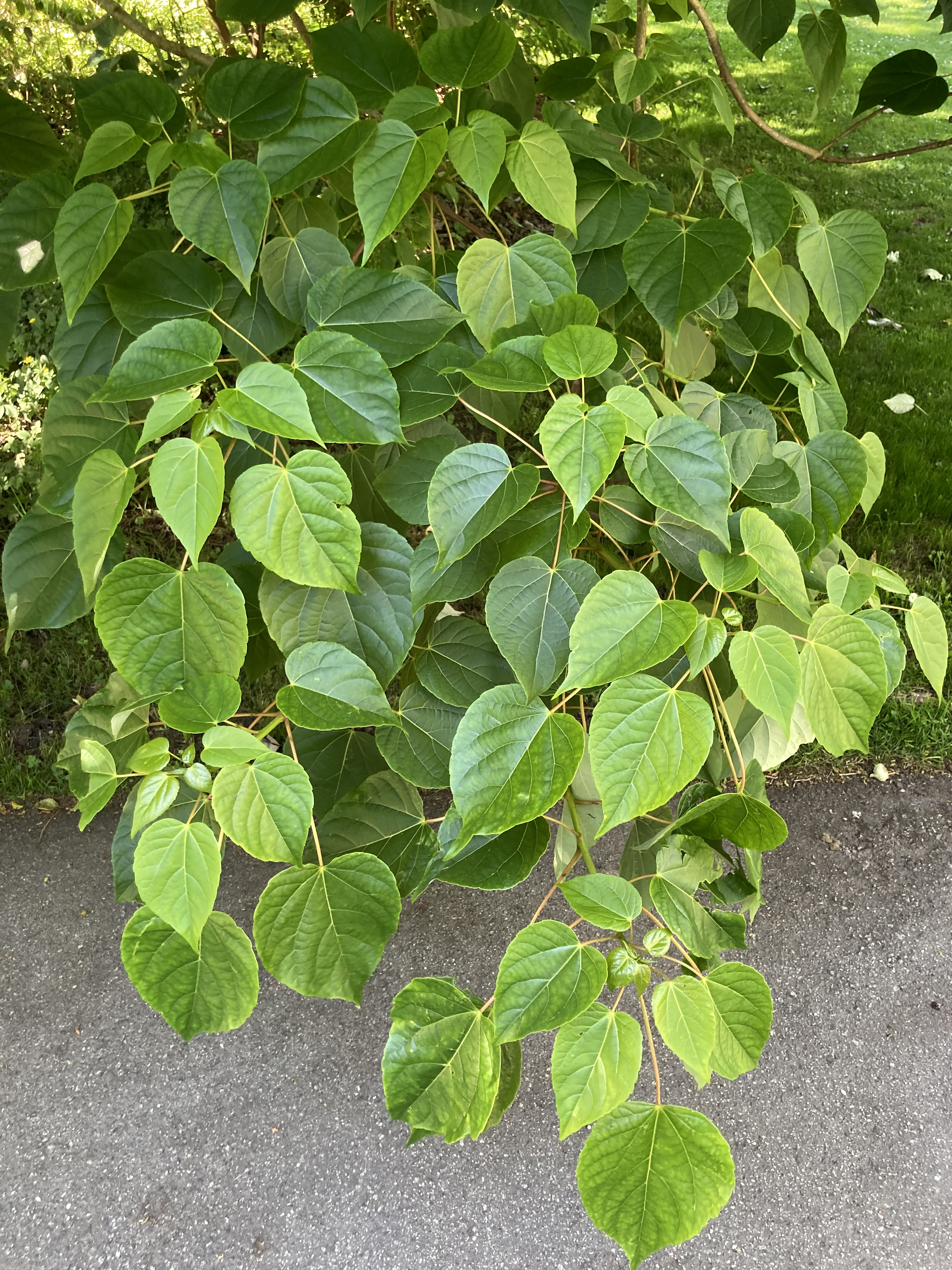
Foliage

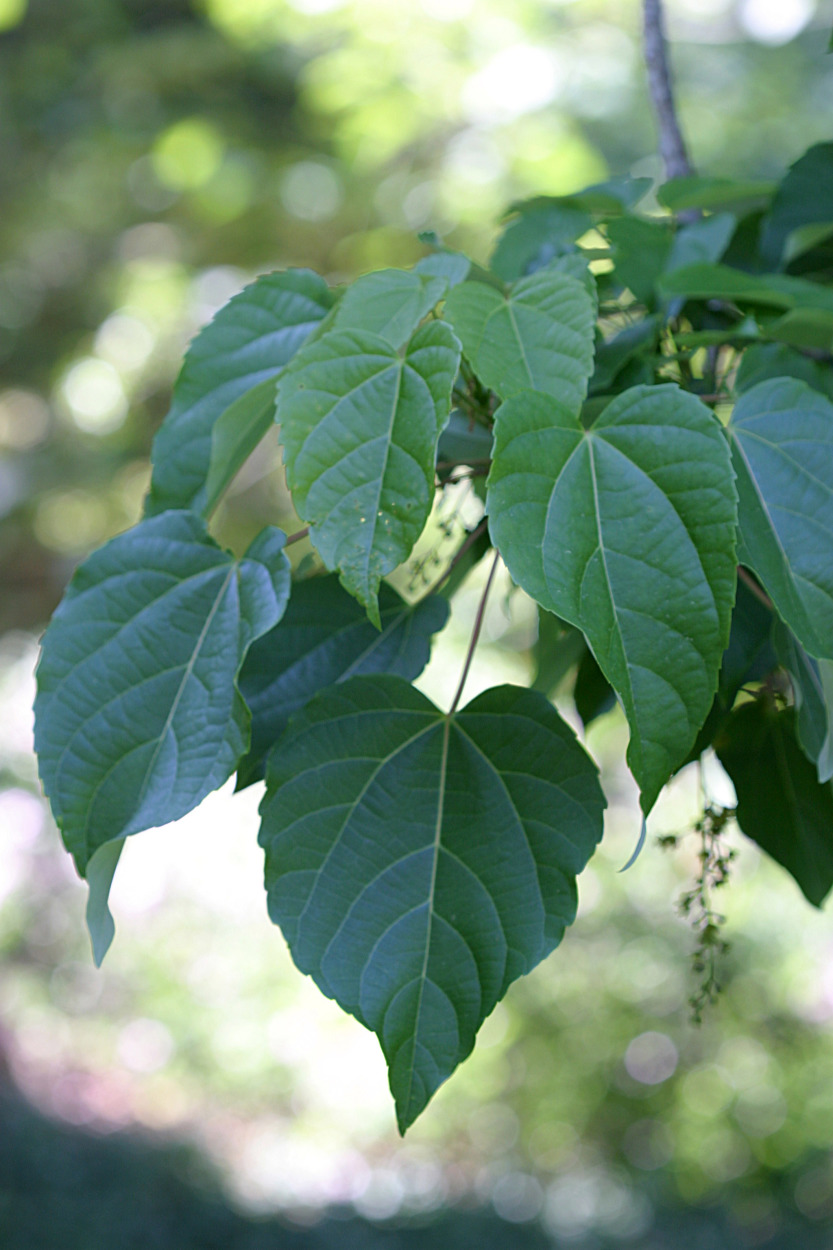
Detail of the leaves

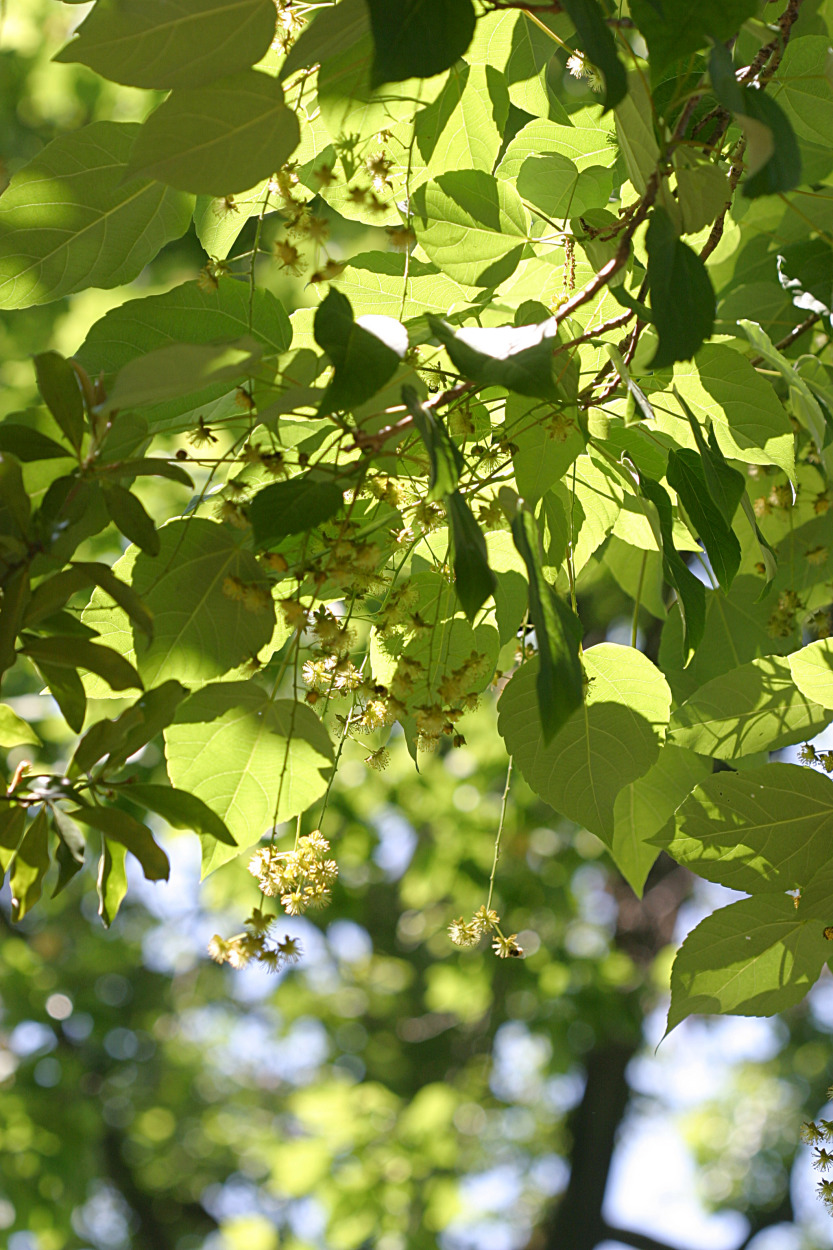
Flowers

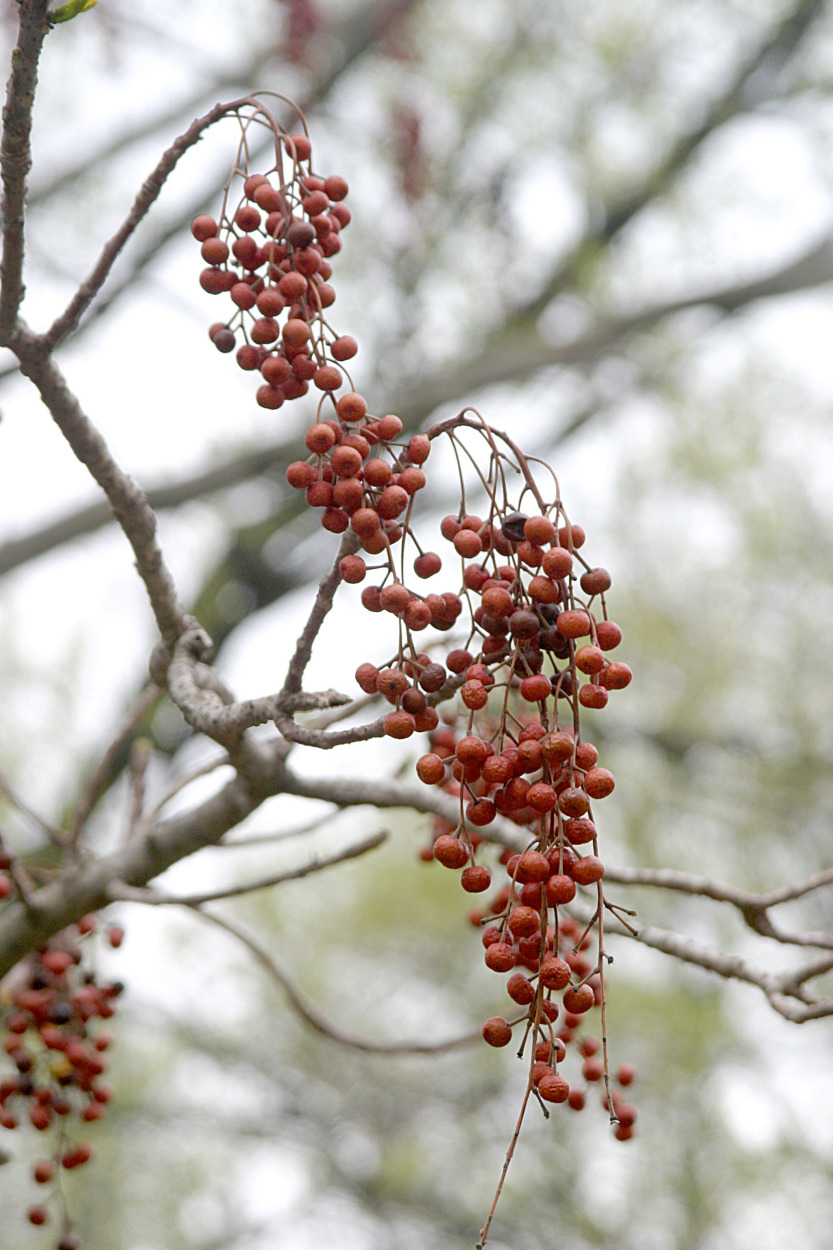
Fruit

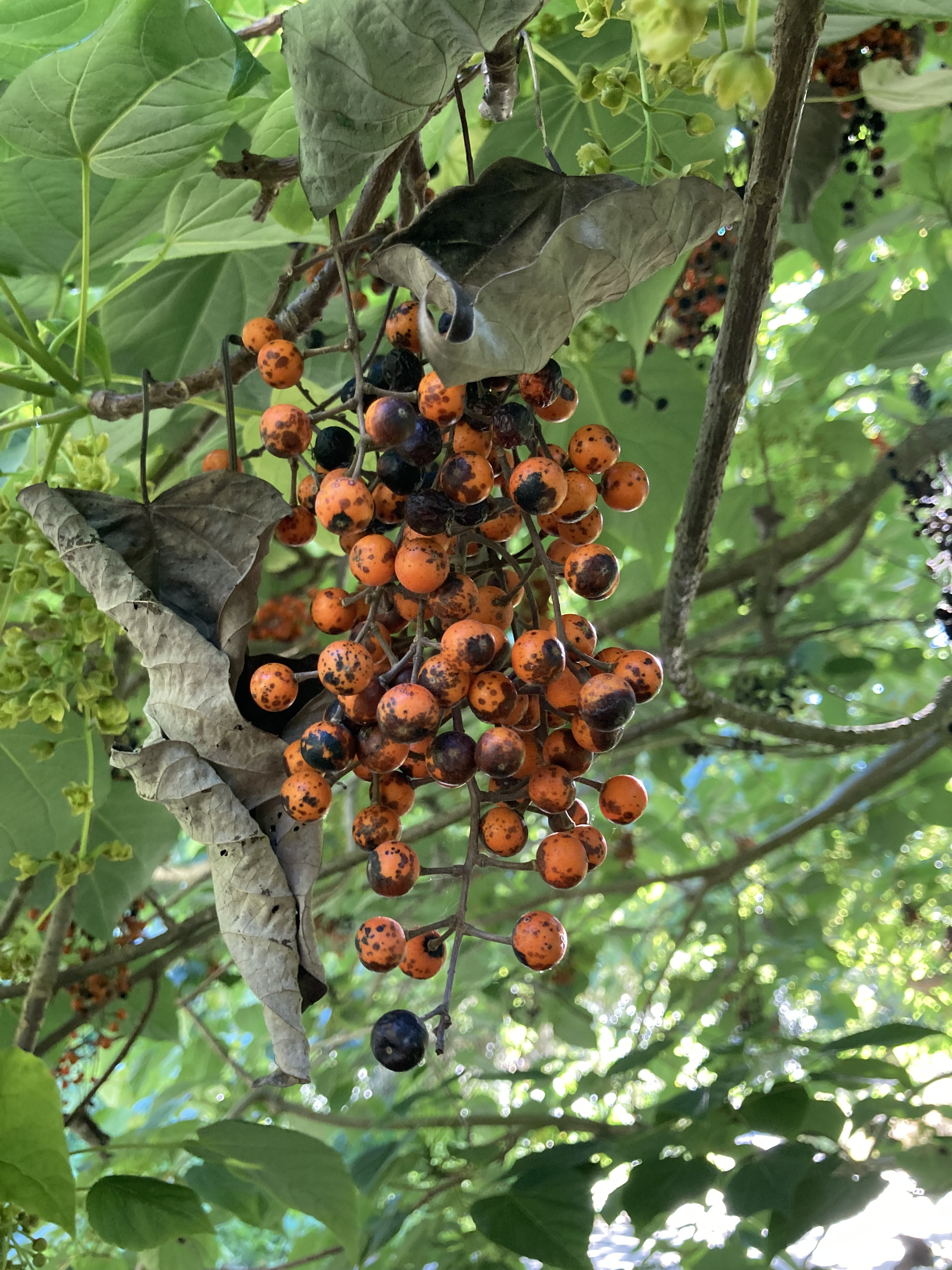
At San Francisco Botanical Garden.
