= Lucidus =

Lucidus may refer to:

- Ananas lucidus, a plant species related to the pineapple
- Asymphorodes lucidus, a species of moth
- Chlorostilbon lucidus or glittering-bellied emerald, a bird species
- Chrysococcyx lucidus or shining bronze cuckoo
- Conus lucidus, a sea snail species
- Cotoneaster lucidus, a shrub species
- Cyanerpes lucidus or shining honeycreeper, a bird species
- Hemiculter lucidus or Ussuri sharpbelly, a freshwater fish species
- Hemignathus lucidus or Nukupu‘u, a bird species
- Hyalurgus lucidus, a species of fly
- Ligustrum lucidum or Chinese privet, a flowering plant species
- Orthogonius lucidus, a species of ground beetle
- Phalacrocorax lucidus or white-breasted cormorant, a bird species
- Polyergus lucidus, a species of ant
- Proserpinus lucidus, a species of moth
- Siphocampylus lucidus, a plant species

== See also ==
Technology

- Lucida, a family of typefaces developed in 1985
- Lucida (intelligent assistant), software that uses natural language processing and machine vision to behave as a personal assistant

Anatomy

- Septum lucidum or septum pellucidum, a thin structure separating two fluid pockets in the brain
- Stratum lucidum, a layer of skin
- Tapetum lucidum, a layer of tissue in the eye

Insects

- Apatema lucidum, a moth
- Hexoplon lucidum, a species of beetle in the family Cerambycidae
- Lucida (skipper), a genus of skipper butterflies
- Metaphrenon lucidum, a species of beetle in the family Cerambycidae
- Nosopon lucidum, a species of lice in the family Menoponidae

Snails

- Conasprella lucida, a predatory sea snail
- Drepanotrema lucidum, a freshwater snail
- Helix lucida, a synonym for Oxychilus draparnaudi, a land snail
- Oxychilus lucidum, a synonym for Oxychilus draparnaudi
- Vexillum lucidum, a sea snail

Other fauna

- Hieracium lucidum, a perennial herb of the genus Hieracium

Flora

- Angelica lucida or seacoast angelica, a species in the celery family
- Archidendron lucidum, a tree species in the family Fabaceae
- Asplenium adiantum-nigrum or black spleenwort, a common species of fern
- Asplenium lucidum, a synonym for Asplenium adiantum-nigrum
- Bulbophyllum lucidum, a species of orchid in the genus Bulbophyllum
- Caucalis lucida, a synonym for Angelica lucida
- Coelopleurum lucidum, a synonym for Angelica lucida
- Dasylirion lucidum, a plant in the family Asparagaceae
- Galium lucidum, a species of plants in the family Rubiaceae
- Ganoderma lucidum, the lingzhi mushroom
- Gelsemium lucidum, a synonym for Gelsemium sempervirens
- Geranium lucidum, or shining cranesbill, a species of the genus Geranium
- Huntleya lucida, a species of orchid in the genus Huntleya
- Imperatoria lucida, a synonym for Angelica lucida
- Lacistema lucidum, a species of small tree in the family Lacistemataceae
- Ligustrum lucidum, the wax-leaf privet
- Molongum lucidum, a genus of plant in the family Apocynaceae (genus Molongum )
- Orthophytum lucidum, a species in the genus Orthophytum
- Ribes lucidum, a synonym for Ribes alpinum
- Sedum lucidum, a species of plant in the family Crassulaceae
- Vaccinium lucidum, a shrub of the subgenus Vaccinium
- Zygopetalum lucidum, a synonym for Huntleya lucida
