= Smodicini =

Scientific classification
- Domain: Eukaryota
- Kingdom: Animalia
- Phylum: Arthropoda
- Class: Insecta
- Order: Coleoptera
- Suborder: Polyphaga
- Infraorder: Cucujiformia
- Family: Cerambycidae
- Subfamily: Cerambycinae
- Tribe: Smodicini; Lacordaire, 1869

Tribe of beetles

Smodicini is a tribe of beetles in the subfamily Cerambycinae, containing the following genera and species:

== Genera ==
According to BioLib:

1. Afrosmodicum Martins, 1975
2. Caediscum Lefkovitch, 1962
3. Holorusius Fairmaire, 1898
4. Luscosmodicum Martins, 1970
5. Marupiara Martins & Galileo, 2006
6. Metaphrenon Martins, 1975
7. Morettus Adlbauer, 2007
8. Nesosmodicum Martins, 1971
9. Pseudossibia Adlbauer, 2005
10. Smodicum Haldeman, 1847

== Selected species ==
- Luscosmodicum beaveri Martins, 1970
- Genus Marupiara
  - Marupiara castanea Martins & Galileo, 2006
- Genus Metaphrenon
  - Metaphrenon impressicolle (Lacordaire, 1869)
  - Metaphrenon lucidum (Olivier, 1795)
- Genus Nesosmodicum
  - Nesosmodicum gracile (Melzer, 1923)
- Genus Smodicum
  - Smodicum angusticolle Aurivillius, 1919
  - Smodicum brunneum Thomson, 1878
  - Smodicum clancularium Martins, 1975
  - Smodicum confusum Martins, 1985
  - Smodicum cucujiforme (Say, 1826)
  - Smodicum depressum Thomson, 1878
  - Smodicum dinellii Bruch, 1911
  - Smodicum longicorne Martins, 1975
  - Smodicum pacificum Linsley, 1934
  - Smodicum parandroides Bates, 1884
  - Smodicum recticolle Martins, 1975
  - Smodicum semipubescens Gounelle, 1911
  - Smodicum texanum Knull, 1966
  - Smodicum torticolle Martins, 1975
