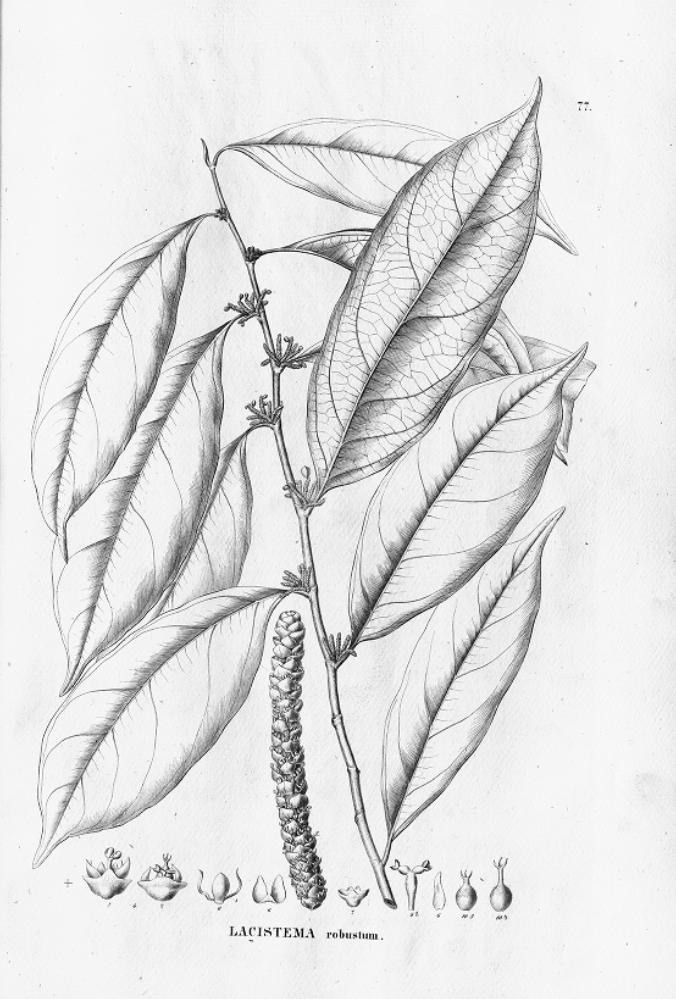

Conservation status
- Least Concern (IUCN 2.3)

Scientific classification
- Kingdom: Plantae
- Clade: Tracheophytes
- Clade: Angiosperms
- Clade: Eudicots
- Clade: Rosids
- Order: Malpighiales
- Family: Lacistemataceae
- Genus: Lacistema
- Species: L. robustum

Binomial name
- Lacistema robustum Schnizlein

= Lacistema robustum =

Species of flowering plant

Lacistema robustum is a species of plant in the Lacistemataceae family. It is endemic to Brazil.
