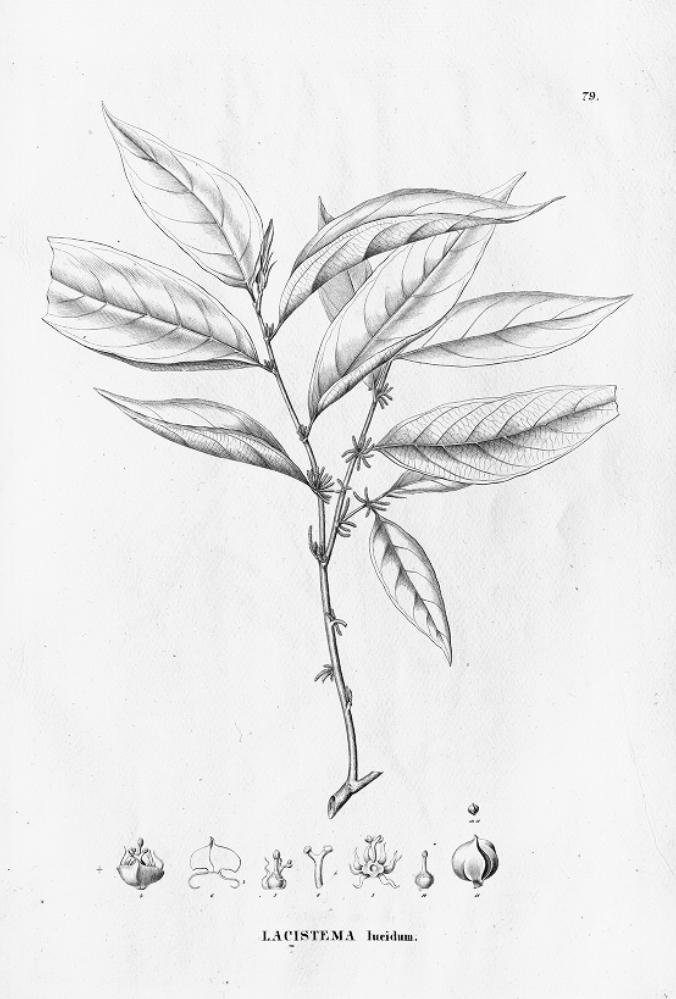

Conservation status
- Data Deficient (IUCN 2.3)

Scientific classification
- Kingdom: Plantae
- Clade: Tracheophytes
- Clade: Angiosperms
- Clade: Eudicots
- Clade: Rosids
- Order: Malpighiales
- Family: Lacistemataceae
- Genus: Lacistema
- Species: L. lucidum

Binomial name
- Lacistema lucidum Schnizl.

= Lacistema lucidum =

Species of shrub

Lacistema lucidum is a species of flowering plant in the family Lacistemataceae. It is a small tree or shrub that is endemic to Brazil, where it is known from five states including Pará and São Paulo. It occurs in Atlantic rain forest habitat, and is an uncommon species.

The original taxonomic treatment of L. lucidum is found in Flora Brasiliensis (4(1): 282, pl. 79, 81, f. 5. 1857), a mid-nineteenth to early twentieth century flora of Brazilian angiosperms. This species is not easily distinguished from Lacistema pubescens and Lacistema serrulatum, and some authorities consider L. pubescens to be the same species as L. lucidum.
