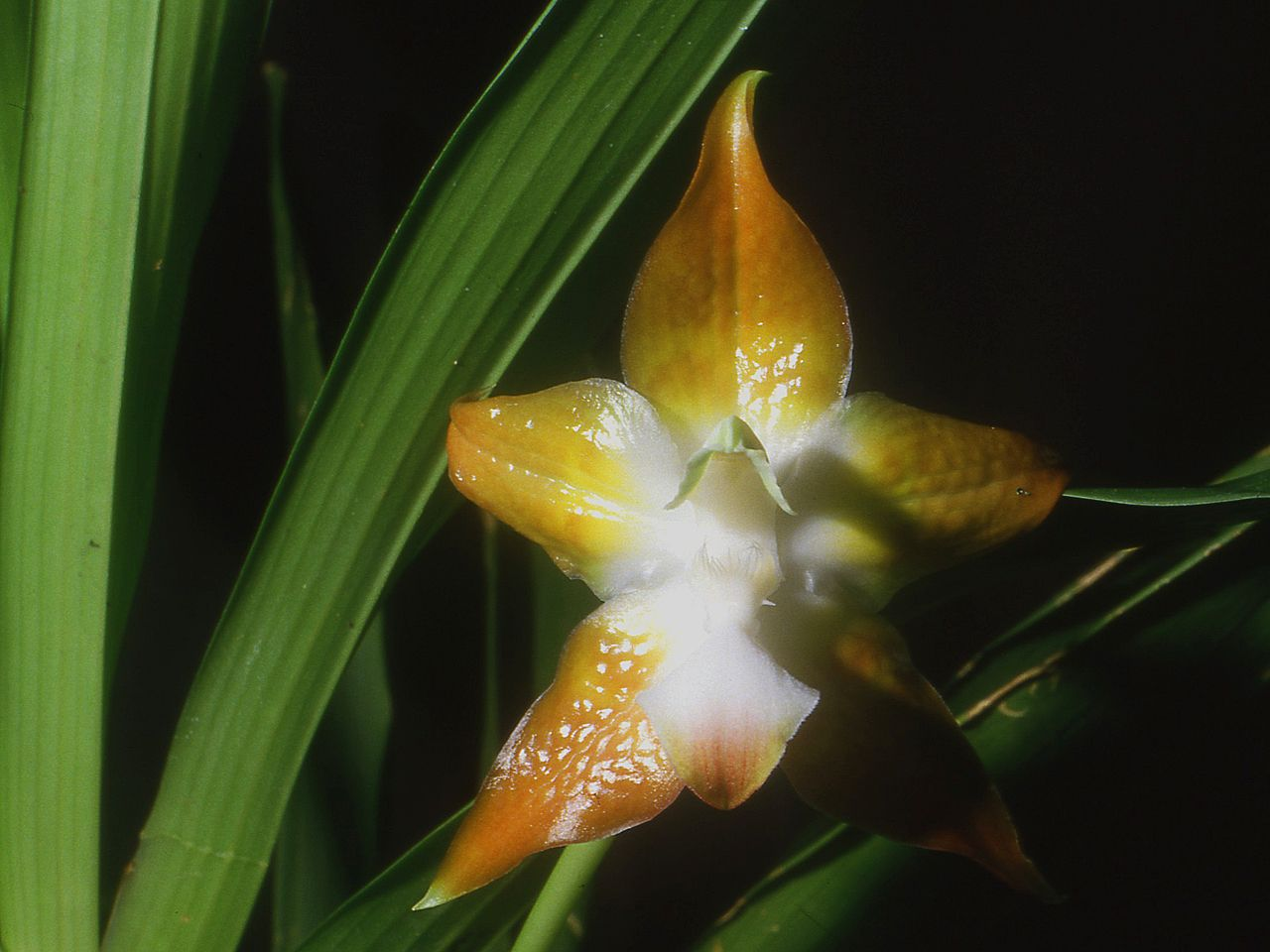

Scientific classification
- Kingdom: Plantae
- Clade: Tracheophytes
- Clade: Angiosperms
- Clade: Monocots
- Order: Asparagales
- Family: Orchidaceae
- Subfamily: Epidendroideae
- Genus: Huntleya
- Species: H. meleagris

Binomial name
- Huntleya meleagris Lindl.

Synonyms
- Batemannia meleagris (Lindl.) Rchb.f.; Huntleya albidofulva Lem.; Zygopetalum meleagris (Lindl.) Benth.; Batemannia meleagris var. albidofulva Rchb.f. ex F.Buyss.; Zygopetalum meleagris albidofulvum (Lem.) G.Nicholson; Huntleya meleagris var. albofulva (Rchb.f. ex F.Buyss.) Cogn. in C.F.P.von Martius

= Huntleya meleagris =

Species of orchid

Huntleya meleagris is a species of orchid native to Brazil, Venezuela, Guyana, Colombia, Ecuador and Trinidad and Tobago.
