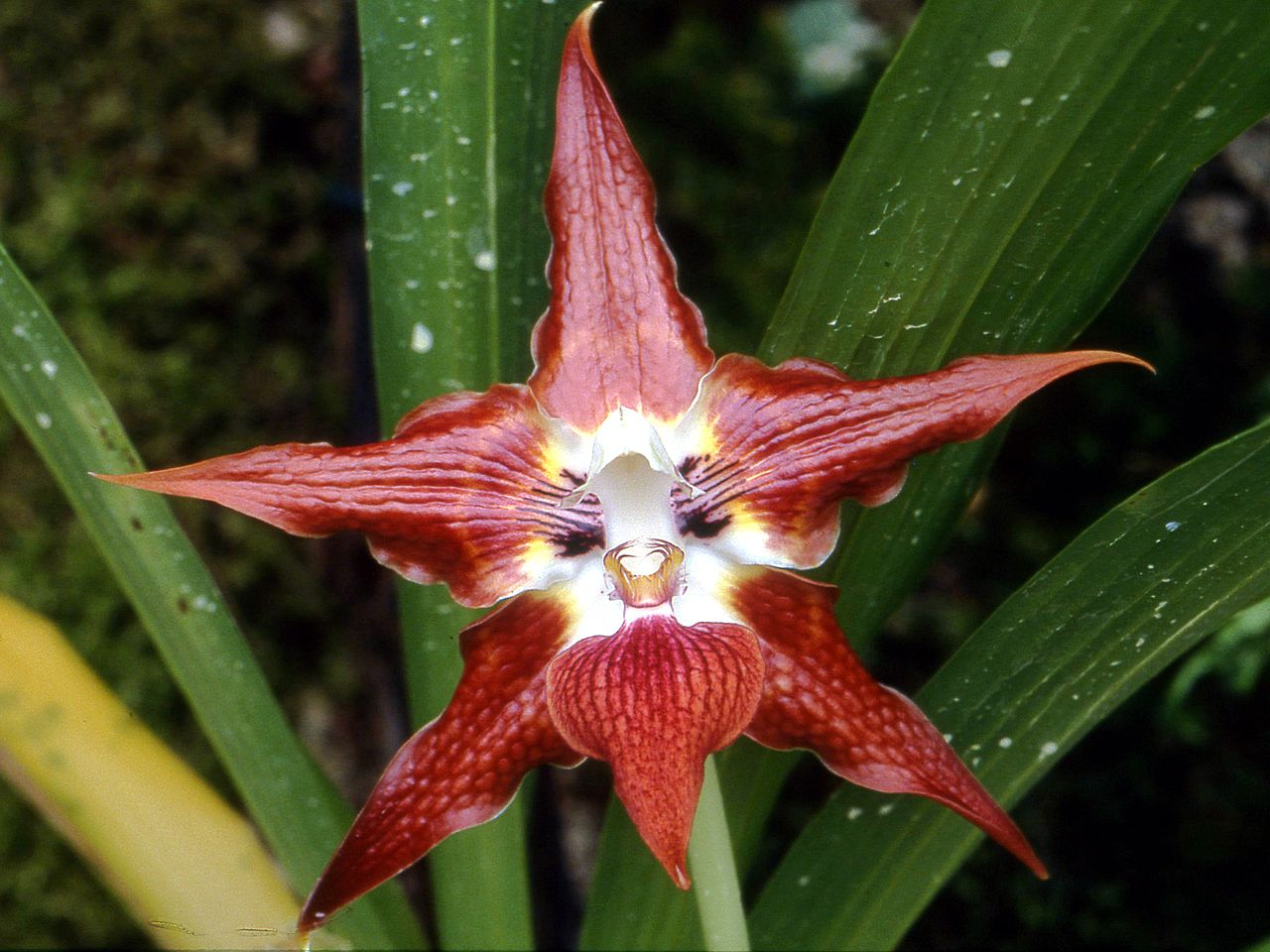

Conservation status
- Least Concern (IUCN 3.1)

Scientific classification
- Kingdom: Plantae
- Clade: Tracheophytes
- Clade: Angiosperms
- Clade: Monocots
- Order: Asparagales
- Family: Orchidaceae
- Subfamily: Epidendroideae
- Genus: Huntleya
- Species: H. burtii

Binomial name
- Huntleya burtii (Endrés & Rchb.f.) Rolfe

Synonyms
- Batemannia burtii Endrés & Rchb.f. (basionym); Zygopetalum burtii (Endrés & Rchb.f.) Benth. & Hook.f. ex Hemsl.

= Huntleya burtii =

Species of orchid

Huntleya burtii, also known as the cat-face orchid, is a species of orchid that occurs in Honduras, Nicaragua, Panama and Costa Rica. It has beautiful fan-shaped growth and bears single, large, glossy flowers on 6" spikes. The long-lived, fragrant blooms may reach 5" across and are red-brown with yellow spotting toward the top, fading to white spotting toward the bottom. These plants usually grow at elevations of 900–3,600 feet and prefer warm, moderately bright environments.
