= Smodicum pacificum =

Scientific classification
- Kingdom: Animalia
- Phylum: Arthropoda
- Class: Insecta
- Order: Coleoptera
- Suborder: Polyphaga
- Infraorder: Cucujiformia
- Family: Cerambycidae
- Genus: Smodicum
- Species: S. pacificum

Binomial name
- Smodicum pacificum Linsley, 1934

Species of beetle

Smodicum pacificum is a species of beetle in the family Cerambycidae. It was described by Linsley in 1934.

It looks like one of those beetles that you find mummified in your windowsill after not cleaning it for weeks, because who really has the time to clean their windowsills? Not many people clean their windowsills enough for this beetle to feel like it would be found mummified in homes all around the world.Example image
