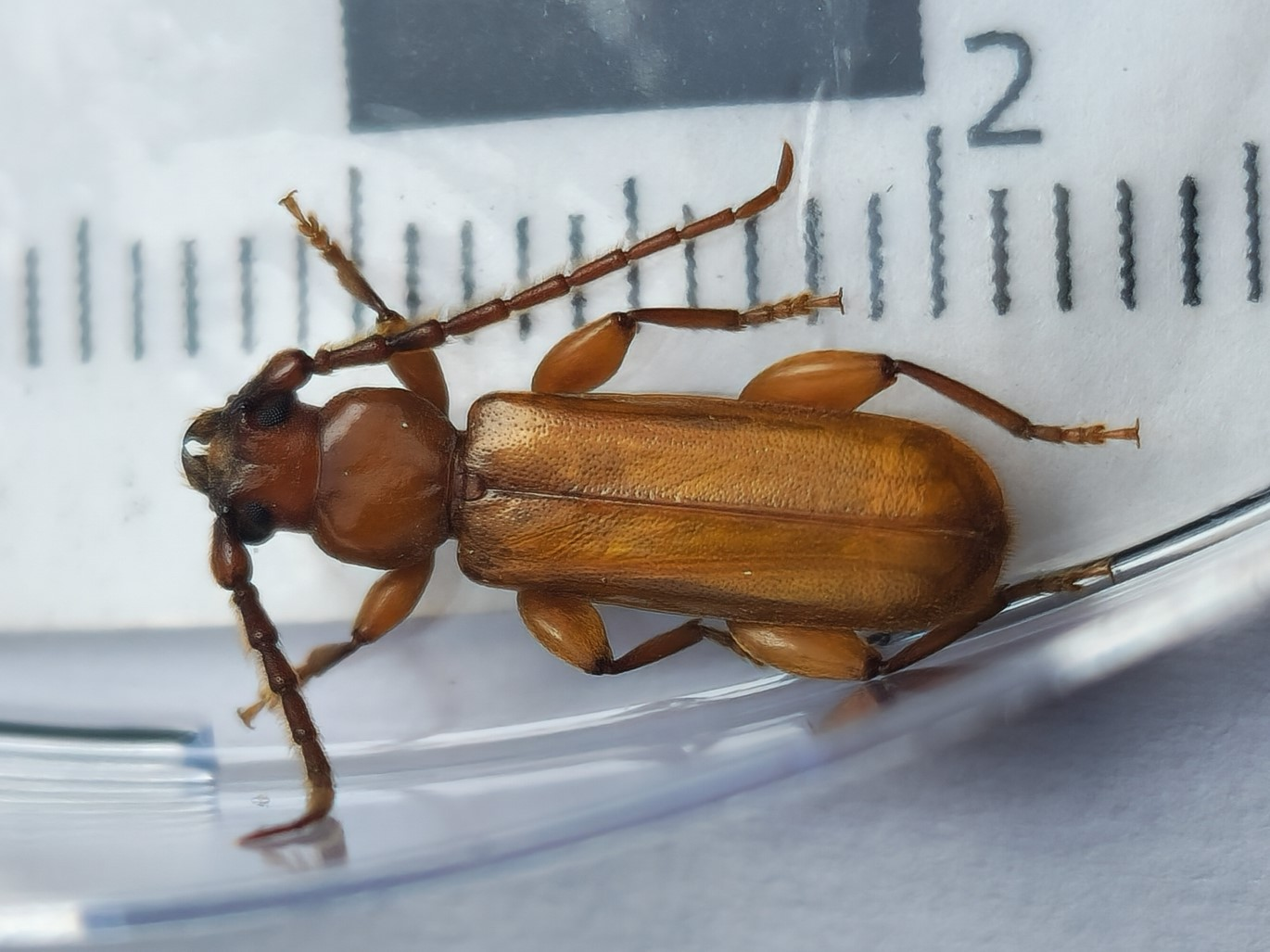

Scientific classification
- Kingdom: Animalia
- Phylum: Arthropoda
- Class: Insecta
- Order: Coleoptera
- Suborder: Polyphaga
- Infraorder: Cucujiformia
- Family: Cerambycidae
- Genus: Smodicum
- Species: S. dinellii

Binomial name
- Smodicum dinellii Bruch, 1911

= Smodicum dinellii =

Species of beetle

Smodicum dinellii is a species of beetle in the family Cerambycidae. It was described by Bruch in 1911.
