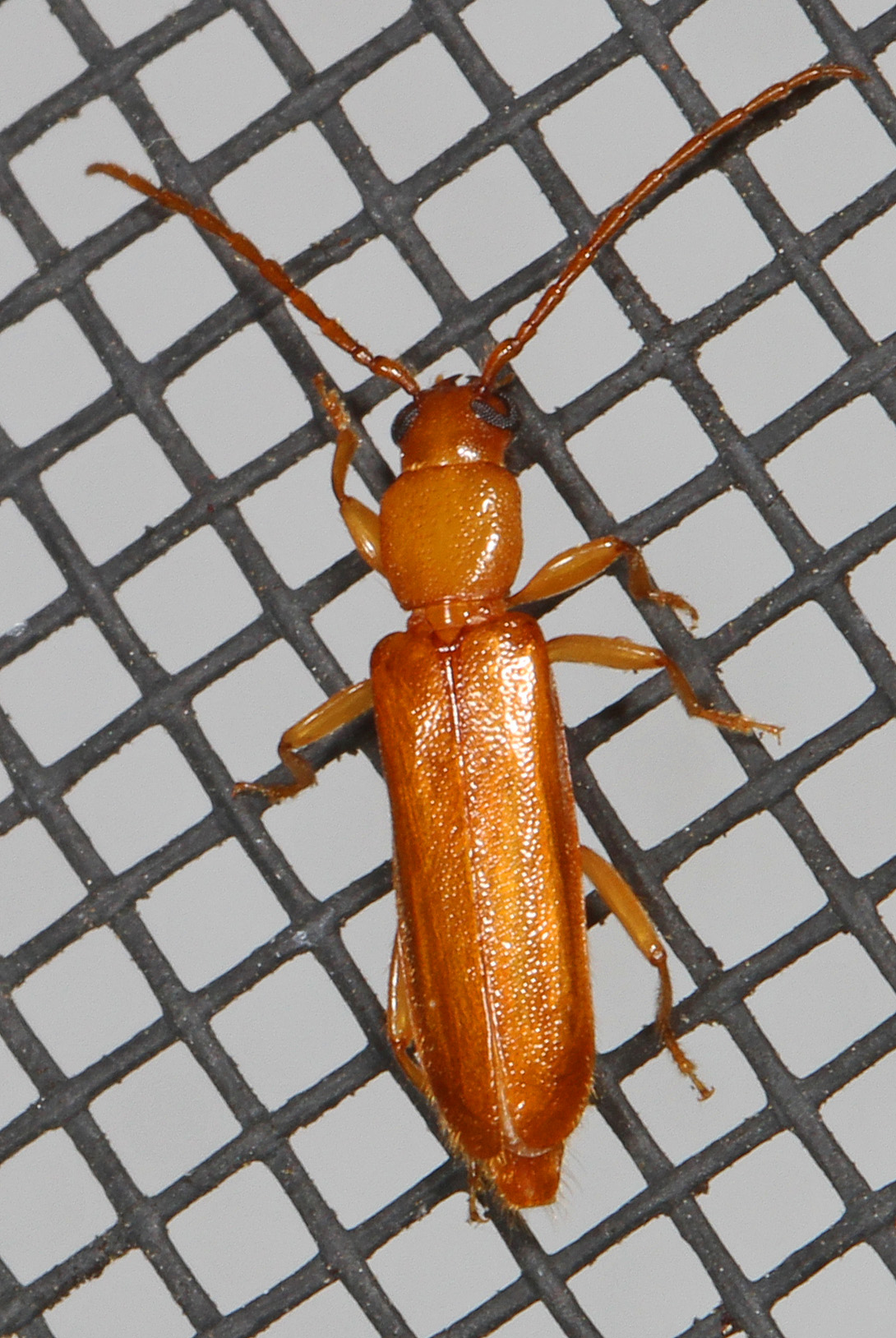

Scientific classification
- Kingdom: Animalia
- Phylum: Arthropoda
- Class: Insecta
- Order: Coleoptera
- Suborder: Polyphaga
- Infraorder: Cucujiformia
- Family: Cerambycidae
- Genus: Smodicum
- Species: S. cucujiforme

Binomial name
- Smodicum cucujiforme (Say, 1826)

= Smodicum cucujiforme =

Species of beetle

Smodicum cucujiforme is a species of beetle in the family Cerambycidae. It was described by Say in 1826.
