= Smodicum texanum =

Scientific classification
- Kingdom: Animalia
- Phylum: Arthropoda
- Class: Insecta
- Order: Coleoptera
- Suborder: Polyphaga
- Infraorder: Cucujiformia
- Family: Cerambycidae
- Genus: Smodicum
- Species: S. texanum

Binomial name
- Smodicum texanum Knull, 1966

Species of beetle

Smodicum texanum is a species of beetle in the family Cerambycidae. It was described by Knull in 1966.
