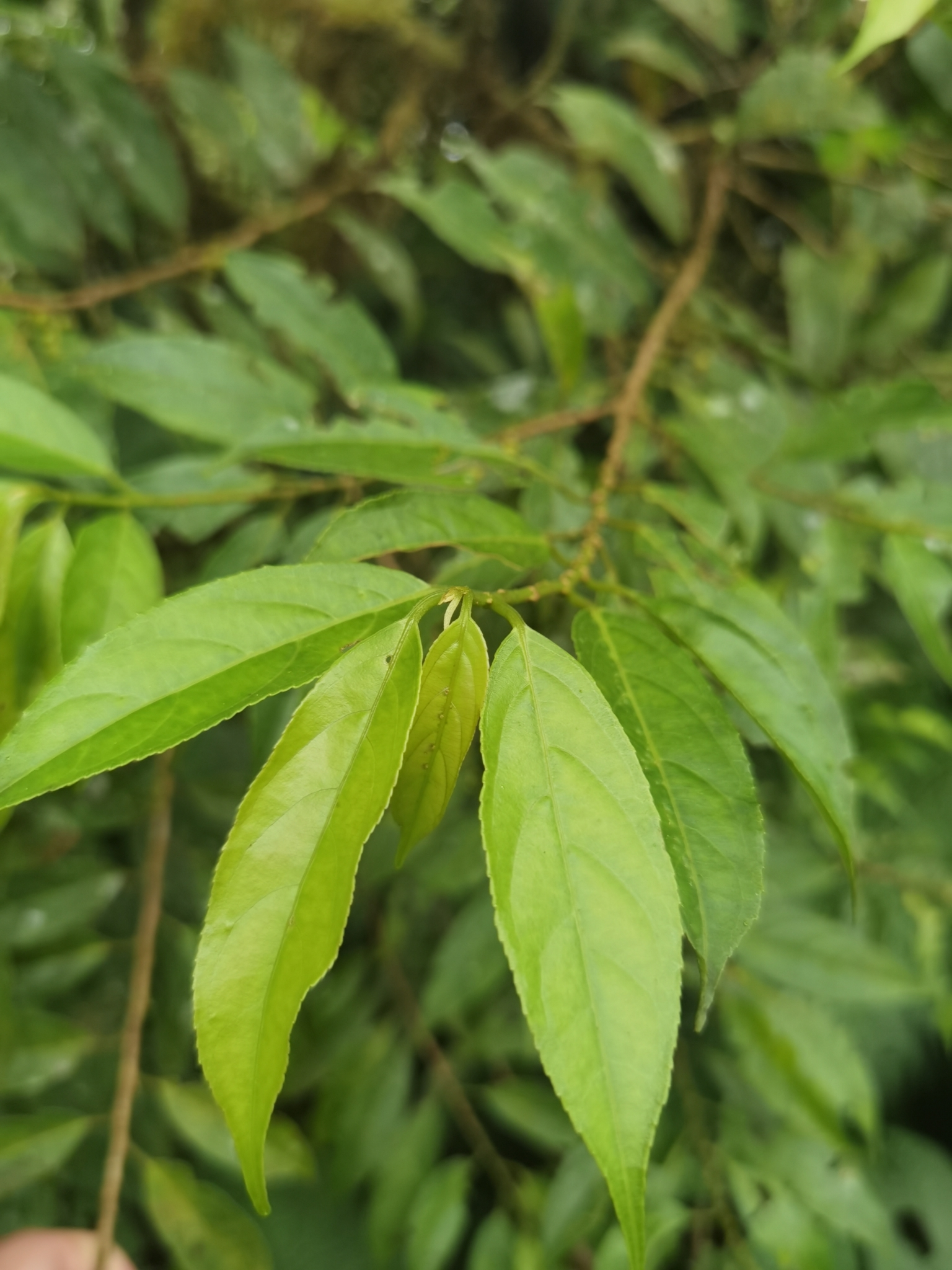
- Lozania pittieri

Scientific classification
- Kingdom: Plantae
- Clade: Embryophytes
- Clade: Tracheophytes
- Clade: Spermatophytes
- Clade: Angiosperms
- Clade: Eudicots
- Clade: Rosids
- Order: Malpighiales
- Family: Lacistemataceae
- Genus: Lozania; Mutis ex Caldas (1810)

Synonyms
- Lacistemopsis Kuhlm.; Monandrodendron Mansf.

= Lozania =

Genus of flowering plants

Lozania is a genus of flowering plants in the family Lacistemataceae. It includes five species native to the tropical Americas, ranging from Nicaragua to Bolivia.

- Lozania glabrata A.H.Gentry
- Lozania klugii (Mansf.) Mansf.
- Lozania mutisiana Schult.
- Lozania nunkui D.A.Neill & Asanza
- Lozania pittieri (S.F.Blake) L.B.Sm.
