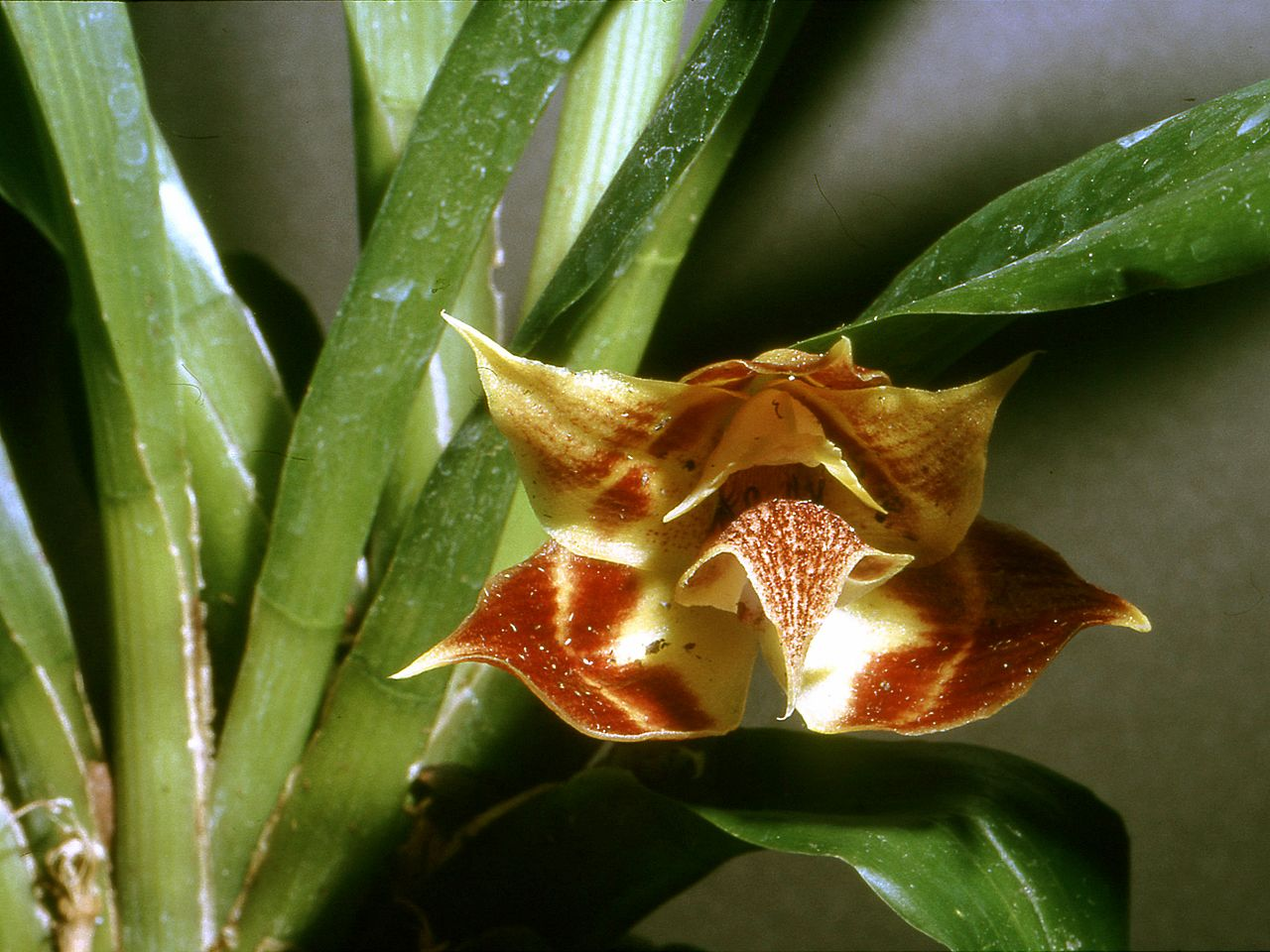

Scientific classification
- Kingdom: Plantae
- Clade: Tracheophytes
- Clade: Angiosperms
- Clade: Monocots
- Order: Asparagales
- Family: Orchidaceae
- Subfamily: Epidendroideae
- Genus: Huntleya
- Species: H. fasciata

Binomial name
- Huntleya fasciata Fowlie

= Huntleya fasciata =

Species of orchid

Huntleya fasciata is a species of orchid that occurs from Colombia and northwestern Ecuador to Honduras and Belize.
