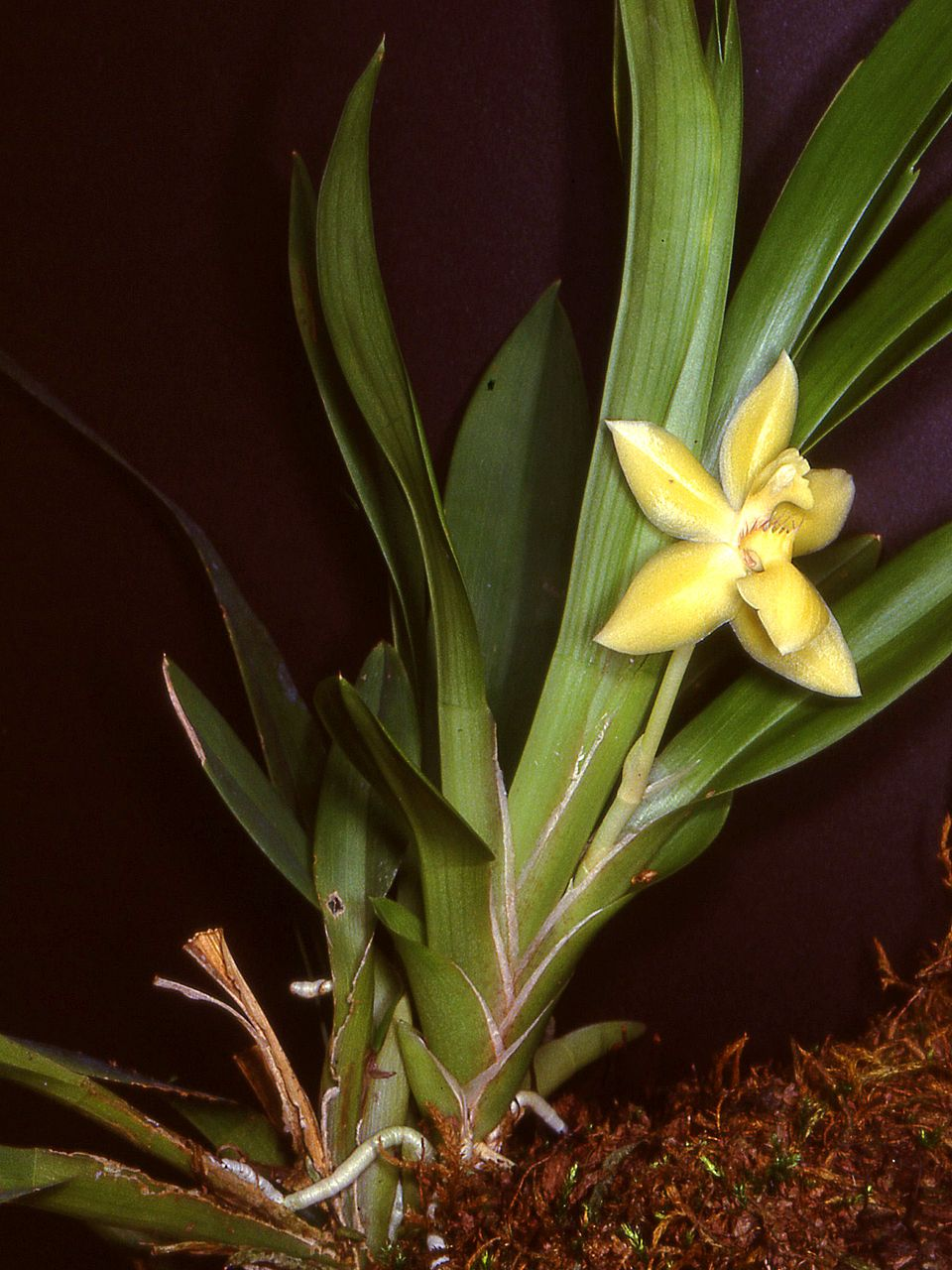

Scientific classification
- Kingdom: Plantae
- Clade: Tracheophytes
- Clade: Angiosperms
- Clade: Monocots
- Order: Asparagales
- Family: Orchidaceae
- Subfamily: Epidendroideae
- Genus: Huntleya
- Species: H. citrina

Binomial name
- Huntleya citrina Rolfe

= Huntleya citrina =

Species of orchid

Huntleya citrina is a species of orchid that occurs in western Colombia and Ecuador.
