= Smodicum depressum =

Scientific classification
- Kingdom: Animalia
- Phylum: Arthropoda
- Class: Insecta
- Order: Coleoptera
- Suborder: Polyphaga
- Infraorder: Cucujiformia
- Family: Cerambycidae
- Genus: Smodicum
- Species: S. depressum

Binomial name
- Smodicum depressum Thomson, 1878

Species of beetle

Smodicum depressum is a species of beetle in the family Cerambycidae. It was described by Thomson in 1878.
