= Smodicum angusticolle =

Scientific classification
- Kingdom: Animalia
- Phylum: Arthropoda
- Class: Insecta
- Order: Coleoptera
- Suborder: Polyphaga
- Infraorder: Cucujiformia
- Family: Cerambycidae
- Genus: Smodicum
- Species: S. angusticolle

Binomial name
- Smodicum angusticolle Aurivillius, 1919

Species of beetle

Smodicum angusticolle is a species of beetle in the family Cerambycidae. It was described by Per Olof Christopher Aurivillius in 1919.
