= Smodicum parandroides =

Scientific classification
- Kingdom: Animalia
- Phylum: Arthropoda
- Class: Insecta
- Order: Coleoptera
- Suborder: Polyphaga
- Infraorder: Cucujiformia
- Family: Cerambycidae
- Genus: Smodicum
- Species: S. parandroides

Binomial name
- Smodicum parandroides Bates, 1884

Species of beetle

Smodicum parandroides is a species of beetle in the family Cerambycidae. It was described by Bates in 1884.
