= Smodicum torticolle =

Scientific classification
- Kingdom: Animalia
- Phylum: Arthropoda
- Class: Insecta
- Order: Coleoptera
- Suborder: Polyphaga
- Infraorder: Cucujiformia
- Family: Cerambycidae
- Genus: Smodicum
- Species: S. torticolle

Binomial name
- Smodicum torticolle Martins, 1975

Species of beetle

Smodicum torticolle is a species of beetle in the family Cerambycidae. It was described by Martins in 1975.
