= Smodicum recticolle =

Scientific classification
- Kingdom: Animalia
- Phylum: Arthropoda
- Class: Insecta
- Order: Coleoptera
- Suborder: Polyphaga
- Infraorder: Cucujiformia
- Family: Cerambycidae
- Genus: Smodicum
- Species: S. recticolle

Binomial name
- Smodicum recticolle Martins, 1975

Species of beetle

Smodicum recticolle is a species of beetle in the family Cerambycidae. It was described by Brazilian entomologist Ubirajara R. Martins in 1975. The species S. recticolle was described as an orange beetle, with darkly colored antennae, and recumbent hairs, among other physiological characteristics. The insect was isolated in Argentina and is believed to be native to the Americas.
