= Smodicum longicorne =

Scientific classification
- Kingdom: Animalia
- Phylum: Arthropoda
- Class: Insecta
- Order: Coleoptera
- Suborder: Polyphaga
- Infraorder: Cucujiformia
- Family: Cerambycidae
- Genus: Smodicum
- Species: S. longicorne

Binomial name
- Smodicum longicorne Martins, 1975

Species of beetle

Smodicum longicorne is a species of beetle in the family Cerambycidae. It was described by Martins in 1975.
