= Metaphrenon impressicolle =

Scientific classification
- Kingdom: Animalia
- Phylum: Arthropoda
- Class: Insecta
- Order: Coleoptera
- Suborder: Polyphaga
- Infraorder: Cucujiformia
- Family: Cerambycidae
- Genus: Metaphrenon
- Species: M. impressicolle

Binomial name
- Metaphrenon impressicolle (Lacordaire, 1869)

Species of beetle

Metaphrenon impressicolle is a species of beetle in the family Cerambycidae. It was described by Lacordaire in 1869.
