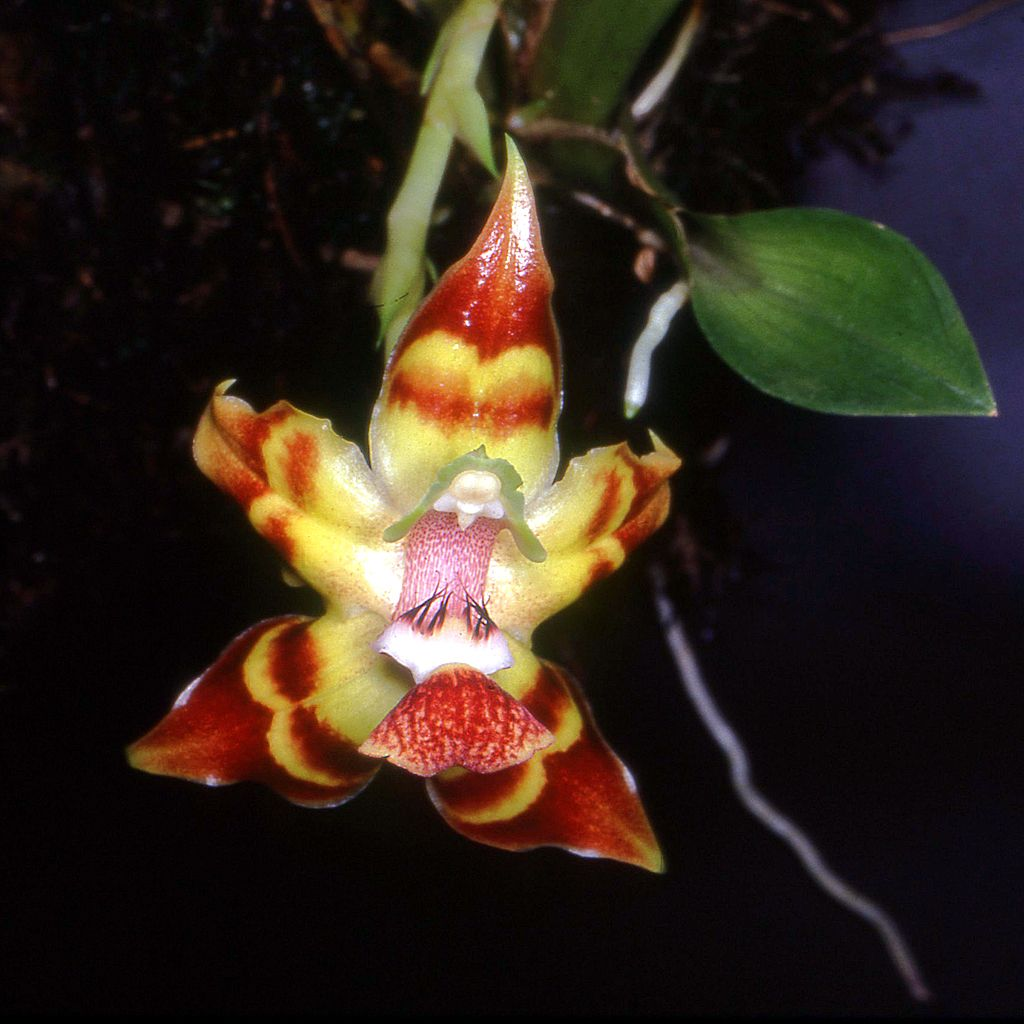

Scientific classification
- Kingdom: Plantae
- Clade: Tracheophytes
- Clade: Angiosperms
- Clade: Monocots
- Order: Asparagales
- Family: Orchidaceae
- Subfamily: Epidendroideae
- Genus: Huntleya
- Species: H. gustavii

Binomial name
- Huntleya gustavii (Rchb.f.) Rolfe

Synonyms
- Batemannia gustavii Rchb.f. (basionym)

= Huntleya gustavii =

Species of orchid

Huntleya gustavii is a species of orchid that occurs in Colombia and Ecuador and of late it is decreasing in population.
