= Marupiara =

Scientific classification
- Kingdom: Animalia
- Phylum: Arthropoda
- Class: Insecta
- Order: Coleoptera
- Suborder: Polyphaga
- Infraorder: Cucujiformia
- Family: Cerambycidae
- Genus: Marupiara
- Species: M. castanea

Binomial name
- Marupiara castanea Martins & Galileo, 2006

Genus of beetles

Marupiara castanea is a species of beetle in the family Cerambycidae, and the only species in the genus Marupiara. It was described by Martins and Galileo in 2006.
