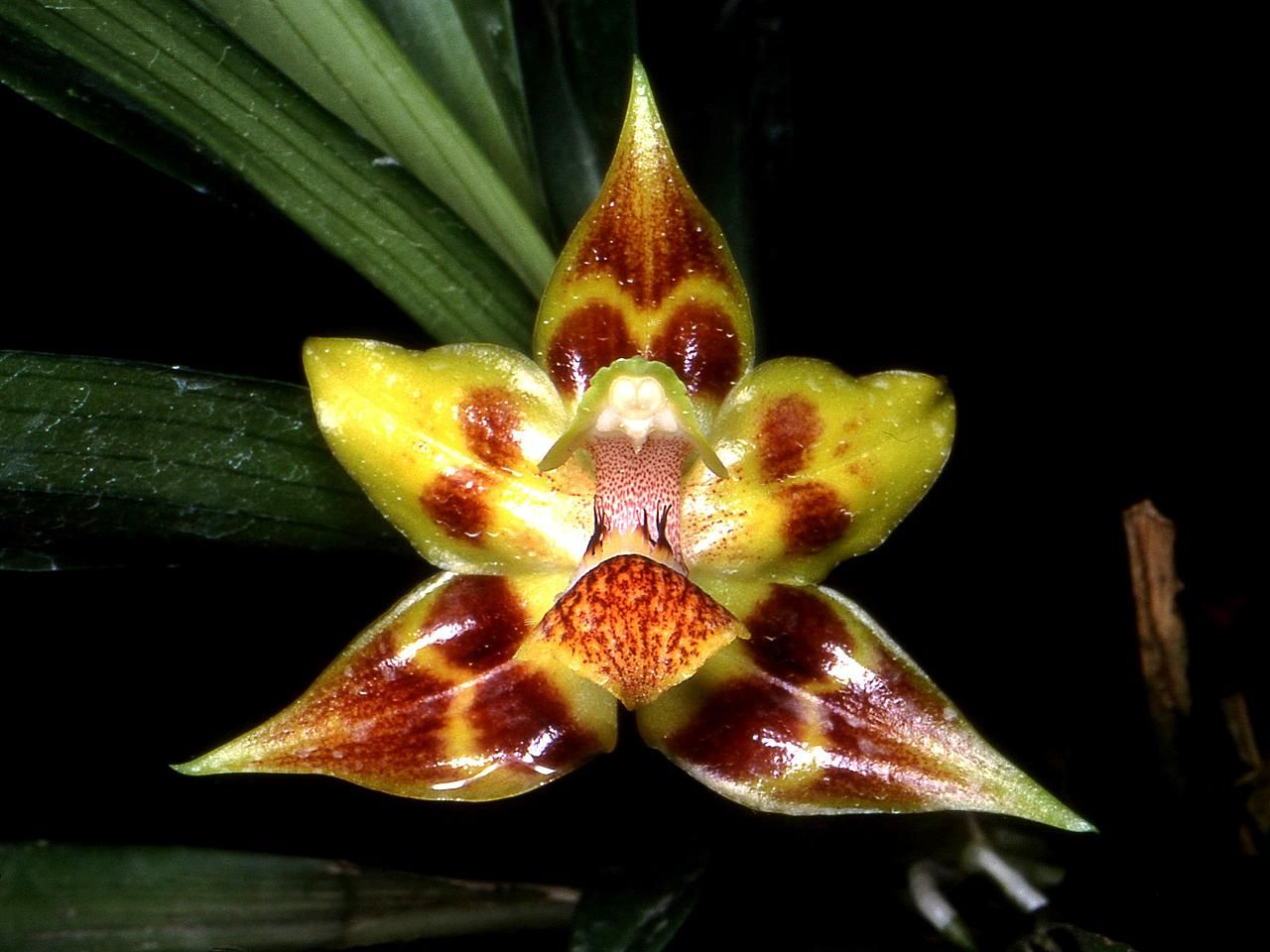

Scientific classification
- Kingdom: Plantae
- Clade: Tracheophytes
- Clade: Angiosperms
- Clade: Monocots
- Order: Asparagales
- Family: Orchidaceae
- Subfamily: Epidendroideae
- Genus: Huntleya
- Species: H. lucida

Binomial name
- Huntleya lucida (Rchb.f.) Rolfe

Synonyms
- Zygopetalum lucidum Rolfe (basionym)

= Huntleya lucida =

Species of orchid

Huntleya lucida is a species of orchid that occurs in northern Brazil (Roraima), Ecuador, Guyana, Honduras and Venezuela.
