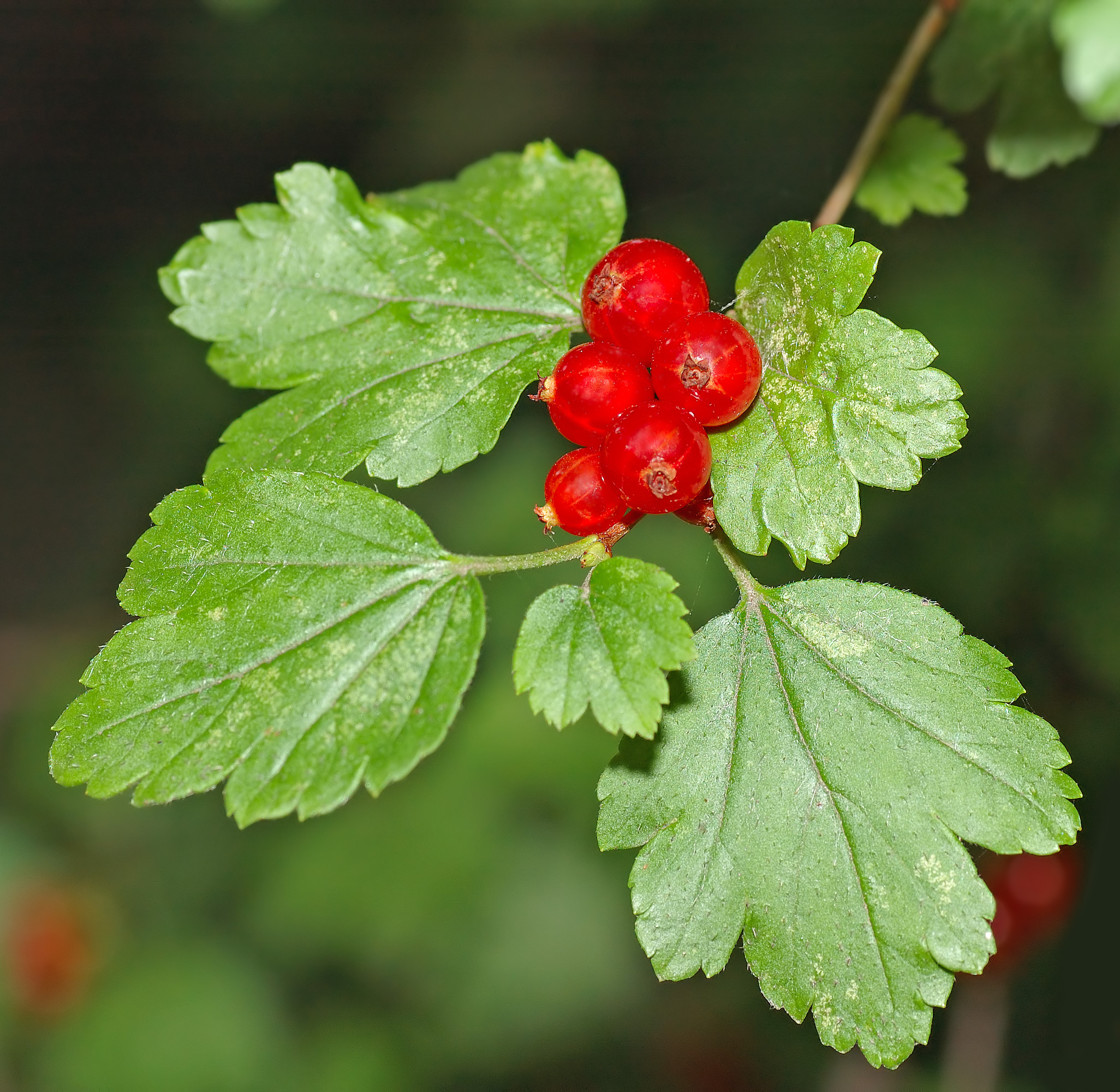
- A twig of alpine currants

Scientific classification
- Kingdom: Plantae
- Clade: Tracheophytes
- Clade: Angiosperms
- Clade: Eudicots
- Order: Saxifragales
- Family: Grossulariaceae
- Genus: Ribes
- Species: R. alpinum

Binomial name
- Ribes alpinum L.

Synonyms
- List: Ribes lucidum Kit.; Grossularia alpestris Bubani; Grossularia insipida Rupr.; Liebichia alpina (L.) Opiz; Liebichia gottsteinii Opiz; Ribes alpinum subsp. lucidum (Kit.) Jasicová; Ribes alpinum subsp. lucidum Pawł.; Ribes pallidigemmum Simonk.; Ribes scopolii Hladnik

= Ribes alpinum =

Alpine currant

Species of shrub

Ribes alpinum, known as mountain currant or alpine currant, is a small deciduous, dioecious shrub native to central and northern Europe from Finland and Norway south to the Alps and Pyrenees and Caucasus, Georgia; in the south of its range, it is confined to high altitudes. It is scarce in western Europe, in Britain being confined to a small number of sites in northern England and Wales.

== Description ==
R. alpinum grows to 2 metres (6 1/2 feet) tall and 1.5 m (5 ft) broad, with an upright and dense shape. The bark is initially smooth and light grey, later it becomes brownish grey and eventually starts to flake off. The buds are scattered, compressed and light green to white. The leaves are palmate. The upper side of the leaves are dark green with scattered hair, while the bottom is light green. The male and female flowers are on distinct specimens. Both kinds of flowers are organized in clusters in the corners of the leaves, where the male's are the longest. The individual flowers are small and greenish-yellow. The edible fruit is red, clear and resembles a redcurrant, but has an insipid taste. Its fruit persists for an average of 27.4 days, and bears an average of 8.3 seeds per fruit. Fruits average 82.1% water, and their dry weight includes 40.6% carbohydrates and 6.1% lipids, which is one of the higher lipid values among European fleshy fruits. The seeds germinate readily.

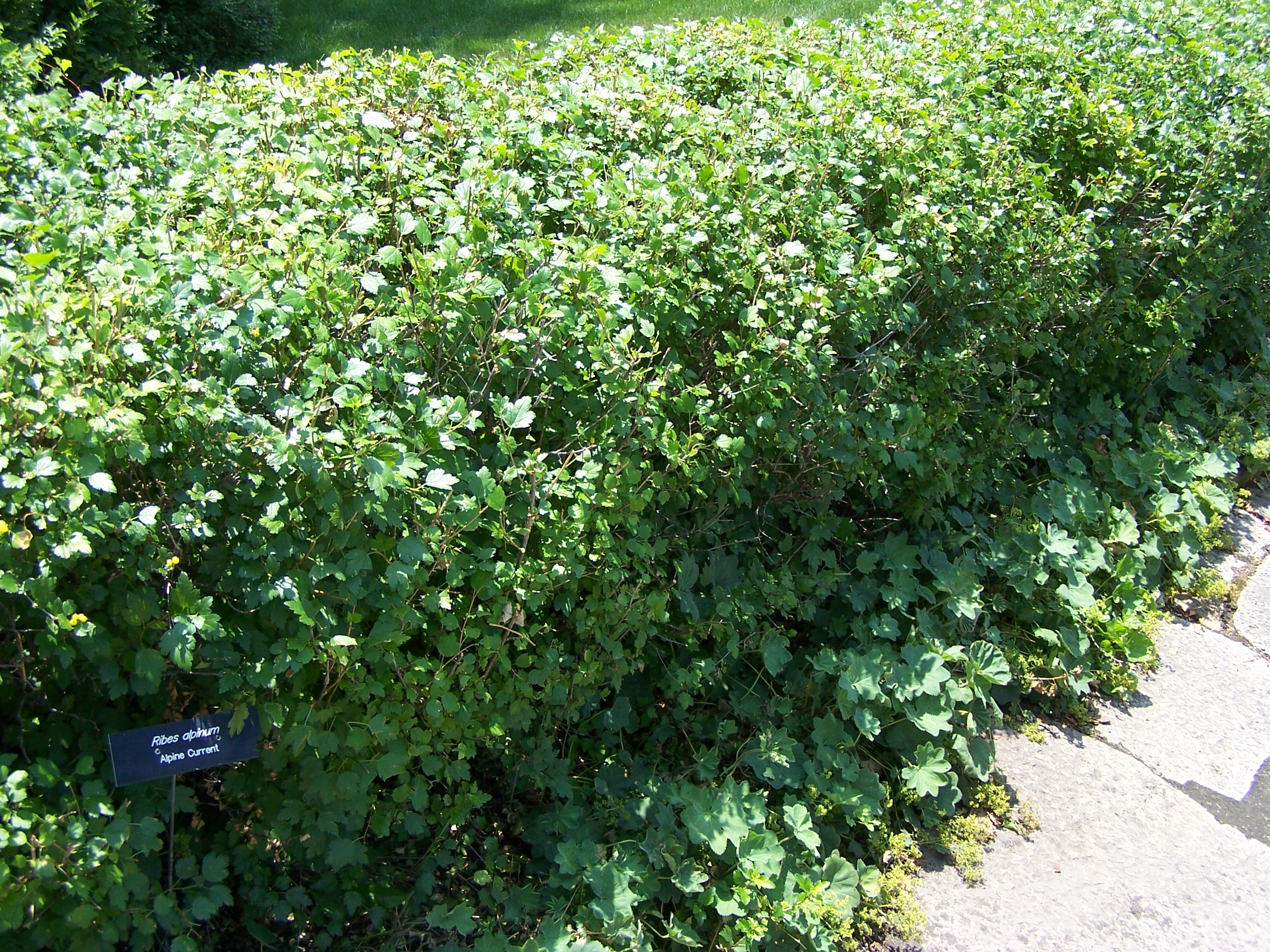
An alpine currant hedge at the Minnesota Landscape Arboretum

== Bibliography ==
- Ehrlén, Johan; Eriksson, Ove (1991). "Phenological variation in fruit characteristics in vertebrate-dispersed plants". Oecologia. 86 (4): 463–470. doi:10.1007/BF00318311. ISSN 0029-8549.
