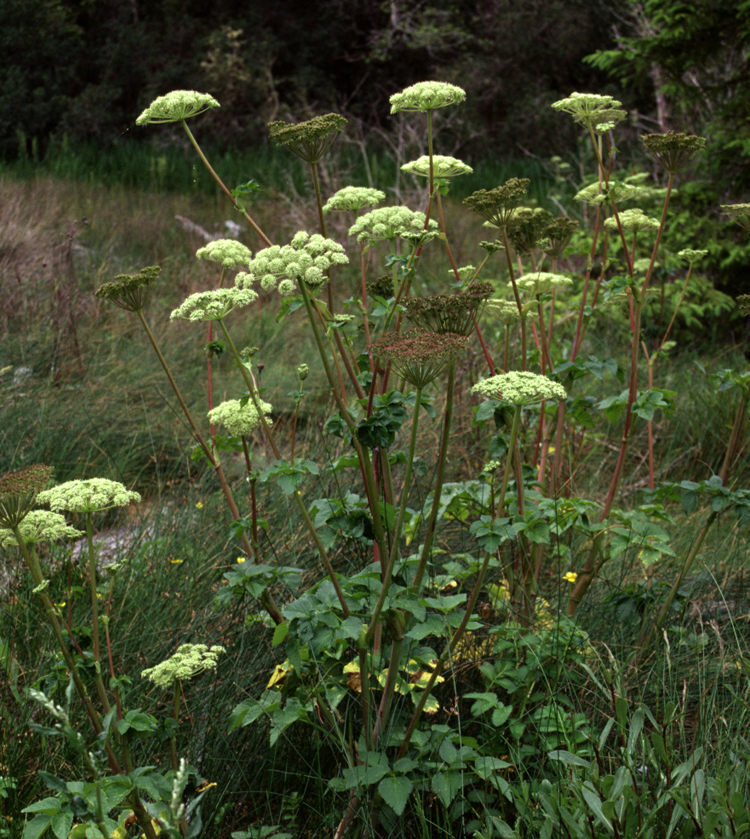
- Humboldt Bay National Wildlife Refuge, California

Scientific classification
- Kingdom: Plantae
- Clade: Tracheophytes
- Clade: Angiosperms
- Clade: Eudicots
- Clade: Asterids
- Order: Apiales
- Family: Apiaceae
- Genus: Angelica
- Species: A. lucida

Binomial name
- Angelica lucida L.

Synonyms
- Archangelica gmelinii DC.; Caucalis lucida (L.) Lag.; Coelopleurum actaeifolium (Michx.) J.M. Coult. & Rose; Coelopleurum gmelinii (DC.) Ledeb.; Coelopleurum lucidum (L.) Fernald; Imperatoria lucida (L.) Spreng.; Ligusticum actaeifolium Michx.

= Angelica lucida =

Species of flowering plant

Angelica lucida is a species of angelica known by the common names seacoast angelica and sea-watch. It is also one of many species in the celery family which are casually called wild celery.

As its common names suggest, this plant is found most often along the coastline. Its distribution includes the Atlantic, Pacific, and Arctic coasts of North America, and the Russian Far East. The species can occur far inland in Arctic climates such as Alaska.

Angelica lucida is considered an endangered species in some of the Northeastern United States.

Angelica lucida is generally similar in appearance to other angelicas, with tall, dense umbels of yellowish-white flowers.
