= Huntleya =

- Huntleya burtii

Scientific classification
- Kingdom: Plantae
- Clade: Tracheophytes
- Clade: Angiosperms
- Clade: Monocots
- Order: Asparagales
- Family: Orchidaceae
- Subfamily: Epidendroideae
- Tribe: Cymbidieae
- Subtribe: Zygopetalinae
- Genus: Huntleya; Bateman ex Lindl.., 1837

Type species
- Huntleya meleagris Lindl.., 1837

Genus of orchids

Huntleya is a small orchid genus native to South America, Central America and Trinidad.

These are epiphytic, pseudobulbless and often larger plants with subplicate leaves nearing forty centimeters long, erect and single-flowered. They occur in wet cloud forests at medium altitudes.

== Species ==
Species currently accepted as of June 2014:

1. Huntleya apiculata (Rchb.f.) Rolfe - Colombia
2. Huntleya brevis Schltr. - Colombia
3. Huntleya burtii (Endres & Rchb.f.) Rolfe - from Colombia north to Guatemala
4. Huntleya caroli P.Ortiz - Colombia
5. Huntleya citrina Rolfe - Colombia, Ecuador
6. Huntleya fasciata Fowlie - Ecuador, Panama, Belize
7. Huntleya grandiflora Lam. - Colombia
8. Huntleya gustavii (Rchb.f.) Rolfe - Colombia, Ecuador
9. Huntleya lucida (Rolfe) Rolfe - Venezuela (including the Venezuelan Islands of the Caribbean), Guyana, Ecuador, Brazil
10. Huntleya meleagris Lindl. - Trinidad and northern South America to Brazil
11. Huntleya sessiliflora Bateman ex Lindl. - Guyana
12. Huntleya vargasii Dodson & D.E.Benn. - Peru
13. Huntleya waldvogelii Jenny - Colombia
14. Huntleya wallisii (Rchb.f.) Rolfe - Ecuador
