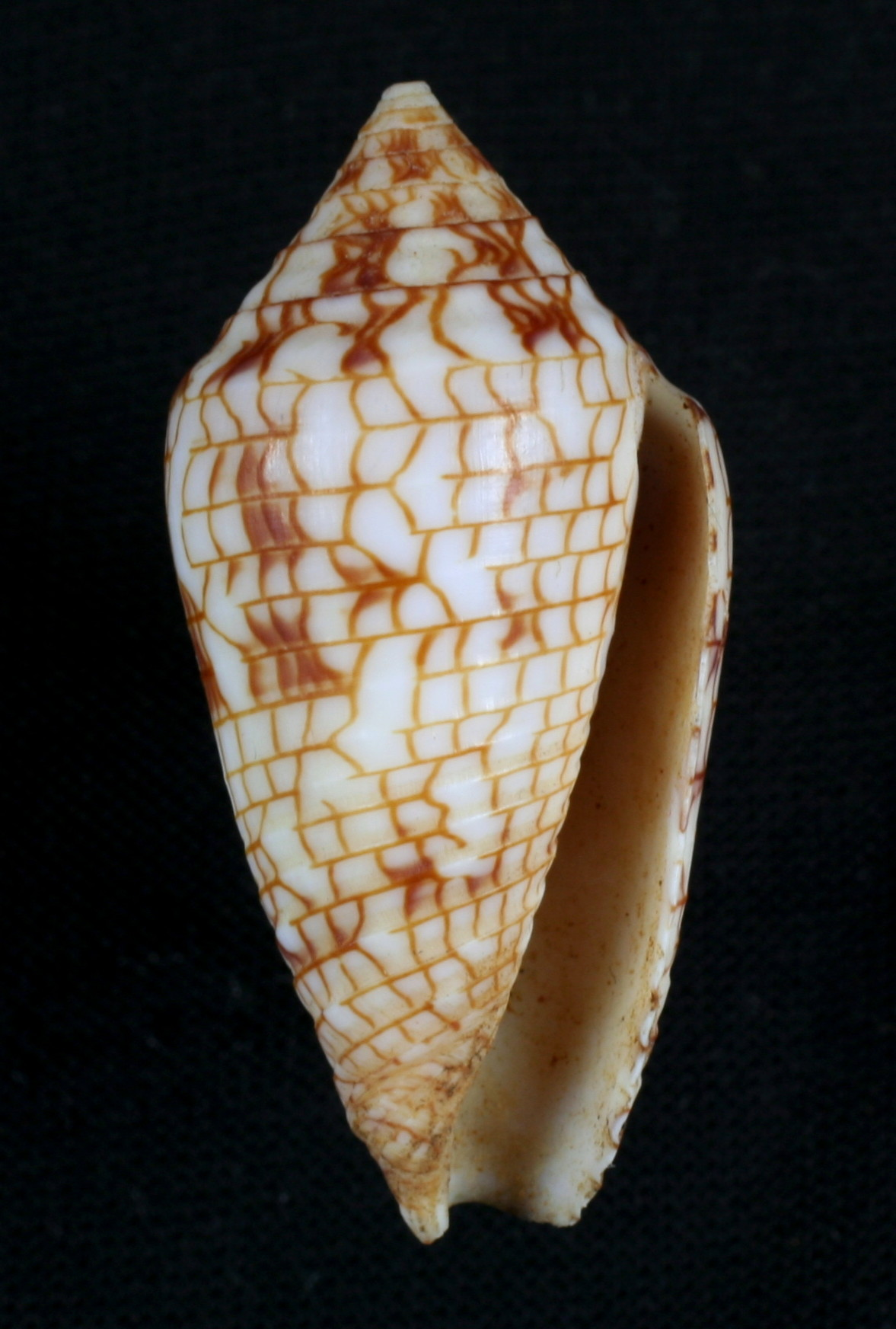
- Apertural view of shell of Conasprella lucida (W. Wood, 1828).

Conservation status
- Least Concern (IUCN 3.1)

Scientific classification
- Kingdom: Animalia
- Phylum: Mollusca
- Class: Gastropoda
- Subclass: Caenogastropoda
- Order: Neogastropoda
- Superfamily: Conoidea
- Family: Conidae
- Genus: Conasprella
- Species: C. lucida

Binomial name
- Conasprella lucida (W. Wood, 1828)

Synonyms
- Conasprella (Ximeniconus) lucida (W. Wood, 1828) · accepted, alternate representation; Conus lucidus W. Wood, 1828 (original combination); Conus reticulatus G. B. Sowerby I, 1834; Perplexiconus lucidus (W. Wood, 1828)

= Conasprella lucida =

Species of gastropod

Conasprella lucida is a species of predatory sea snail, a marine gastropod mollusk in the family Conidae, the cone snails, cone shells or cones.

== Description ==
The size of the shell varies between 14 mm and 54 mm (0.55–2.13 in).

== Distribution ==
The species is found in the Eastern Pacific, occurring off Baja California, Mexico to Peru and off the Galápagos Islands.

== Gallery ==
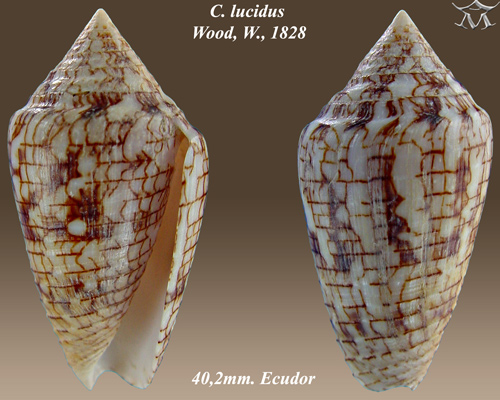
Conasprella lucida (Wood, W., 1828)

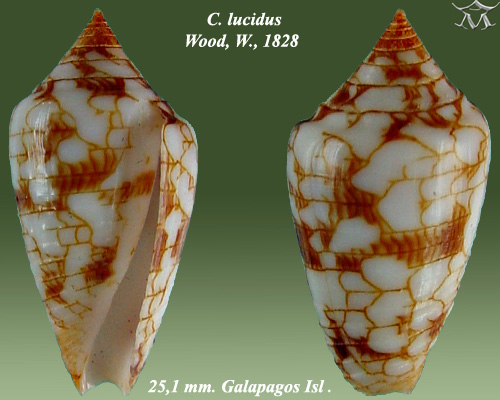
Conasprella lucida (Wood, W., 1828)
