= Luscosmodicum =

Scientific classification
- Kingdom: Animalia
- Phylum: Arthropoda
- Class: Insecta
- Order: Coleoptera
- Suborder: Polyphaga
- Infraorder: Cucujiformia
- Family: Cerambycidae
- Genus: Luscosmodicum
- Species: L. beaveri

Binomial name
- Luscosmodicum beaveri Martins, 1970

Genus of beetles

Luscosmodicum is a genus of beetle in the family Cerambycidae, it contains a single species Luscosmodicum beaveri. It was described by Martins in 1970.
