= Nesosmodicum =

Scientific classification
- Kingdom: Animalia
- Phylum: Arthropoda
- Class: Insecta
- Order: Coleoptera
- Suborder: Polyphaga
- Infraorder: Cucujiformia
- Family: Cerambycidae
- Genus: Nesosmodicum
- Species: N. gracile

Binomial name
- Nesosmodicum gracile (Melzer, 1923)

Species of beetle

Nesosmodicum gracile is a species of beetle in the family Cerambycidae. It is the only species in the genus Nesosmodicum. It was described by Melzer in 1923.
