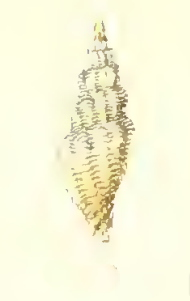
- Drawing of a shell of Vexillum lucidum (holotype)

Scientific classification
- Kingdom: Animalia
- Phylum: Mollusca
- Class: Gastropoda
- Subclass: Caenogastropoda
- Order: Neogastropoda
- Family: Costellariidae
- Genus: Vexillum
- Species: V. lucidum

Binomial name
- Vexillum lucidum (Reeve, 1845)

Synonyms
- Mitra (Costellaria) dorotheae Melvill & Standen, 1896 junior subjective synonym; Mitra dorotheae Melvill & Standen, 1896; Mitra lucida Reeve, 1845 superseded combination; Vexillum (Costellaria) lucidum (Reeve, 1845)

= Vexillum lucidum =

Species of gastropod

Vexillum lucidum, common name the lucid mitre, is a species of small sea snail, marine gastropod mollusk in the family Costellariidae, the ribbed miters.

== Description ==
The length of the shell attains 19 mm, its diameter 6 mm.

(Original description) The transparent white, fusiform shell has a turreted spire, somewhat elongately contracted at the base. The whorls are longitudinally ribbed with ribs swollen at the upper part. The shell is transversely most elegantly ridged. The columella is five-plaited.

(Described as Mitra (Costellaria) dorotheae) The turreted shell has an acuminate spire. it is palest ochre in hue. It contains eight ventricose whorls, angled below the suture and with straight longitudinal ribs crossed with frequent lirae. The aperture is thick within. The outer lip is simple. The columella is four-plaited.

== Distribution ==
This marine species occurs off the Philippines, Fiji and Guam; also off Australia (Northern Territory, Queensland, Western Australia).
