= Metaphrenon lucidum =

Scientific classification
- Kingdom: Animalia
- Phylum: Arthropoda
- Clade: Pancrustacea
- Class: Insecta
- Order: Coleoptera
- Suborder: Polyphaga
- Infraorder: Cucujiformia
- Family: Cerambycidae
- Genus: Metaphrenon
- Species: M. lucidum

Binomial name
- Metaphrenon lucidum (Olivier, 1795)

Species of beetle

Metaphrenon lucidum is a species of beetle in the family Cerambycidae. It was described by Guillaume-Antoine Olivier in 1795.
