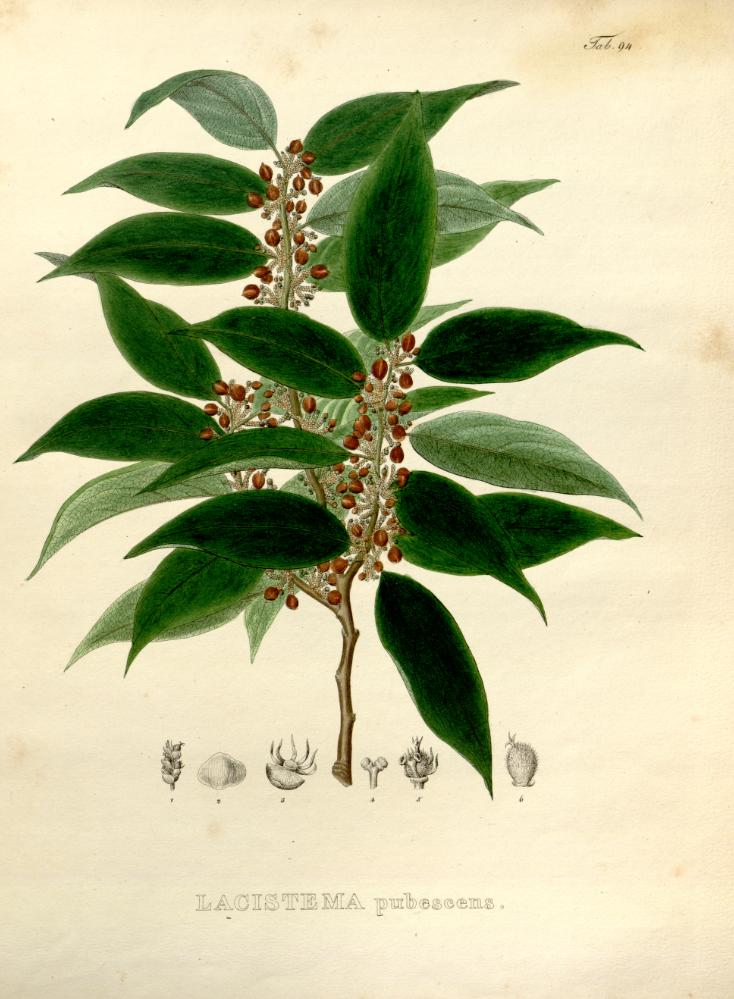
- Lacistema pubescens

Scientific classification
- Kingdom: Plantae
- Clade: Tracheophytes
- Clade: Angiosperms
- Clade: Eudicots
- Clade: Rosids
- Order: Malpighiales
- Family: Lacistemataceae
- Genus: Lacistema; Sw. (1788)

= Lacistema =

Genus of flowering plants

Lacistema is a genus of Lacistemataceae consisting of 12 species :

"Lacistema pubescens Mart. (1826)".

"Lacistema serrulatum Mart. (1826)".

"Lacistema robustum Schnizl. (1857)".

"Lacistema lucidum Schnizl. (1857)".

"Lacistema polystachyum Schnizl. (1857)".

"Lacistema grandifolium Schnizl. (1857)".

"Lacistema hasslerianum Chodat (1903)".

"Lacistema aggregatum (P.J. Bergius) Rusby (1906)".

"Lacistema nena J.F. Macbr. (1934)".

"Lacistema macbridei Baehni (1940)".

"Lacistema krukovii Sleumer (1980)".

"Lacistema ligiae L. Marinho & K.M. Pimenta (2021)".
