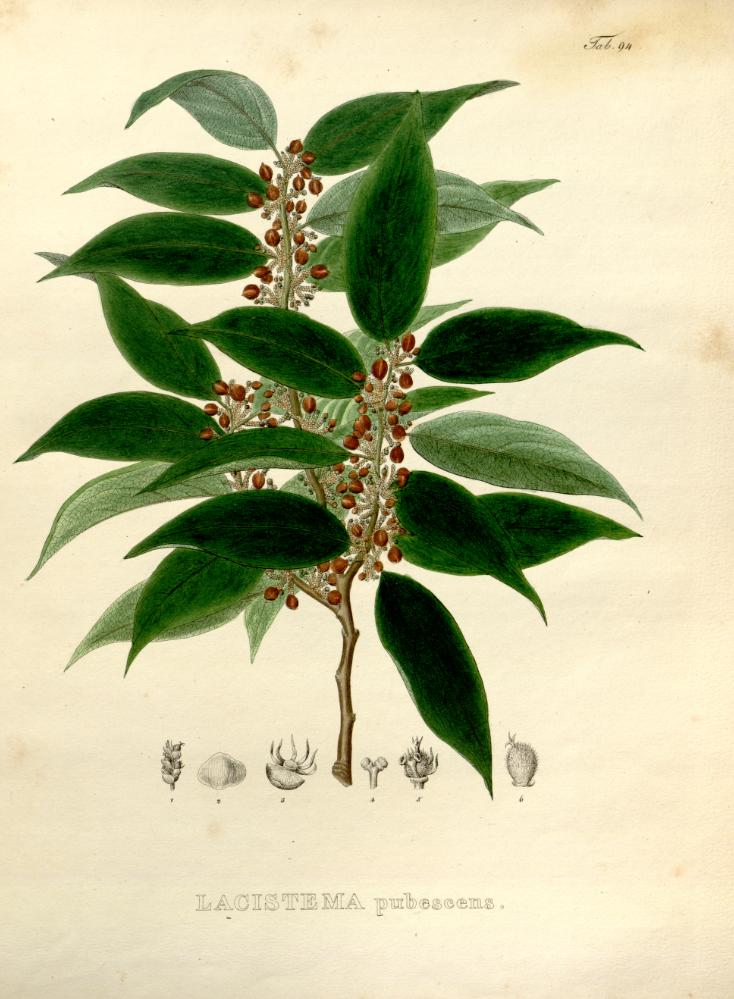
- Lacistema pubescens

Scientific classification
- Kingdom: Plantae
- Clade: Tracheophytes
- Clade: Angiosperms
- Clade: Eudicots
- Clade: Rosids
- Order: Malpighiales
- Family: Lacistemataceae; Mart. (1826)

Genera
- Lacistema; Lozania

= Lacistemataceae =

Family of flowering plants

Lacistemataceae is a small flowering plant family. There are two genera:

- Lacistema (12 species)
- Lozania (5 species)

They are small trees (to 15 metres tall) and shrubs (to 5 metres tall) that are native to the subtropical and tropical regions of the Americas (also known as the Neotropics).

The leaves are on alternate sides of the stem and maybe surrounded by a pair of stipules.

The Inflorescence located between the leaf and the stem (axil) are either catkins (in Lacistema) or racemes (in Lozania).

Each flower (mostly bisexual) approximately one millimetre in length consist of a disc with attached bract (in Lacistema) and sepals (in Lozania). Attached to the disc is a single stamen divided into two anthers, the single superior ovary has a single style with three stigmas.

The fruit is a capsule that splits on drying into three parts and contains one seed surrounded by an aril.
