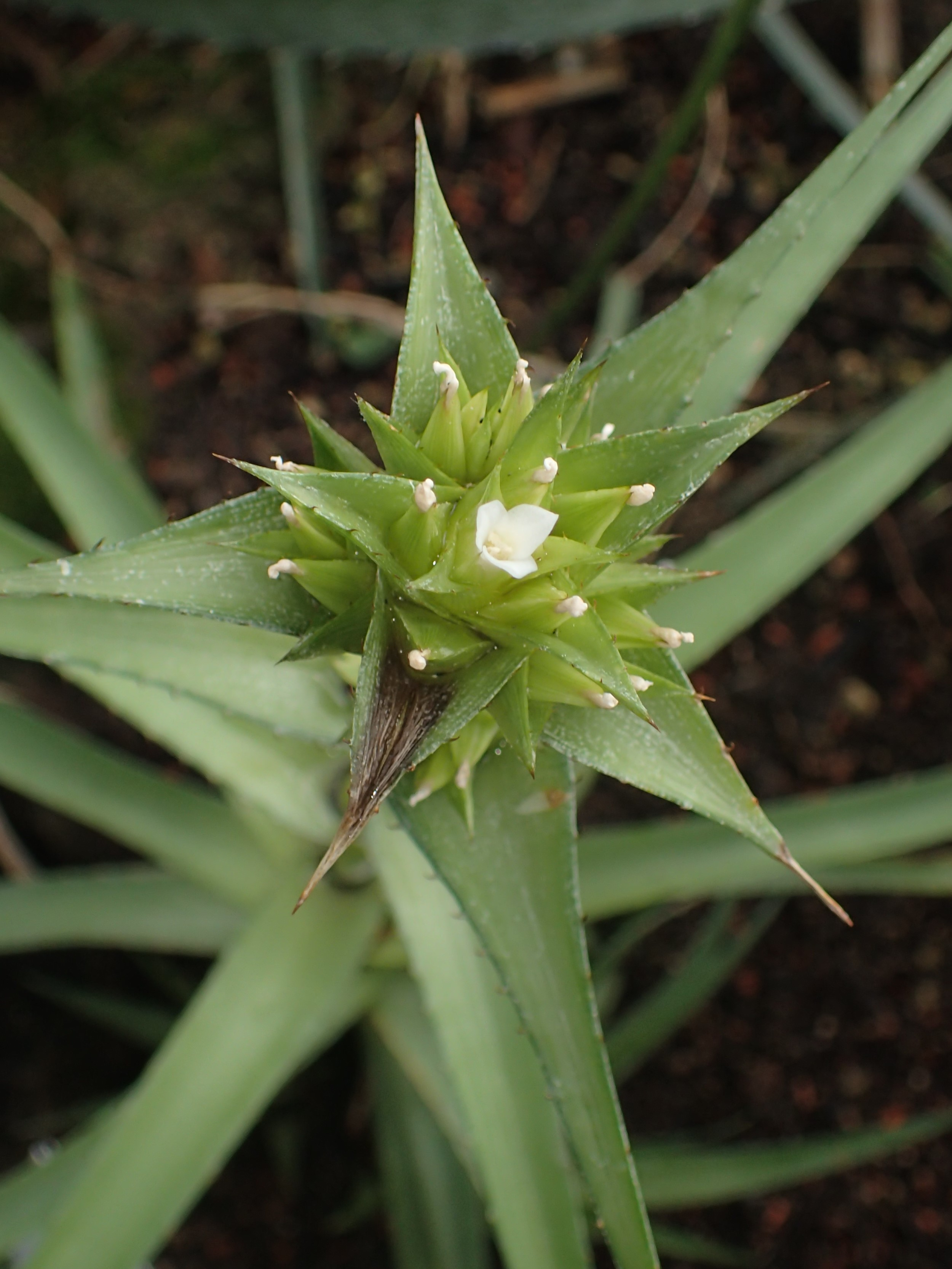
- Orthophytum sanctum

Scientific classification
- Kingdom: Plantae
- Clade: Tracheophytes
- Clade: Angiosperms
- Clade: Monocots
- Clade: Commelinids
- Order: Poales
- Family: Bromeliaceae
- Subfamily: Bromelioideae
- Genus: Orthophytum; Beer

Synonyms
- Prantleia Mez; Cryptanthopsis Ule

= Orthophytum =

Genus of flowering plants

Orthophytum (Greek "ortho" = straight and "phytum" = plant) is a genus in the plant family Bromeliaceae, subfamily Bromelioideae.

== Distribution ==
All the species of the bromeliad genus are endemic to the Atlantic Forest biome (Mata Atlantica Brasileira), located in southeast Brazil.

Species are found in the Brazilian states of Alagoas, Bahia, Espírito Santo, Minas Gerais, Paraíba, and/or Pernambuco.

Due to recent advances in technology and DNA testing many of the original Orthophytum species and cultivars have been reclassified under new genera.

== Species ==
As of November 2022, Plants of the World Online accepted the following species:

- Orthophytum alagoanum Leme & A.P.Fontana
- Orthophytum alvimii W.Weber
- Orthophytum arcanum Leme
- Orthophytum argenteum Louzada & Wand.
- Orthophytum atalaiense J.A.Siqueira & Leme
- Orthophytum benzingii Leme & H.Luther
- Orthophytum boudetianum Leme & L.Kollmann
- Orthophytum braunii Leme
- Orthophytum brejoense Leme, E.H.Souza & Vidigal
- Orthophytum buranhense Leme & A.P.Fontana
- Orthophytum catingae Leme
- Orthophytum cearense Leme & F.J.S.Monteiro
- Orthophytum compactum L.B.Sm.
- Orthophytum conquistense Leme & M.Machado
- Orthophytum cristaliense Leme
- Orthophytum diamantinense Leme
- Orthophytum disjunctum L.B.Sm.
- Orthophytum duartei L.B.Sm.
- Orthophytum eddie-estevesii Leme
- Orthophytum elegans Leme
- Orthophytum erigens Leme
- Orthophytum estevesii (Rauh) Leme
- Orthophytum falconii Leme
- Orthophytum foliosum L.B.Sm.
- Orthophytum formosense Leme
- Orthophytum fosterianum L.B.Sm.
- Orthophytum glabrum (Mez) Mez
- Orthophytum gouveianum Leme & O.B.C.Ribeiro
- Orthophytum graomogolense Leme & C.C.Paula
- Orthophytum grossiorum Leme & C.C.Paula
- Orthophytum guaratingense Leme & L.Kollmann
- Orthophytum gurkenii Hutchison
- Orthophytum harleyi Leme & M.Machado
- Orthophytum horridum Leme
- Orthophytum jabrense Baracho & J.A.Siqueira
- Orthophytum jacaraciense Leme
- Orthophytum lanuginosum Leme & C.C.Paula
- Orthophytum lemei E.Pereira & I.A.Penna
- Orthophytum leprosum (Mez) Mez
- Orthophytum lucidum Leme & H.Luther
- Orthophytum lymanianum E.Pereira & I.A.Penna
- Orthophytum macroflorum Leme & M.Machado
- Orthophytum magalhaesii L.B.Sm.
- Orthophytum maracasense L.B.Sm.
- Orthophytum mello-barretoi L.B.Sm.
- Orthophytum minimum Leme & O.B.C.Ribeiro
- Orthophytum piranianum Leme & C.C.Paula
- Orthophytum pseudostoloniferum Leme & L.Kollmann
- Orthophytum pseudovagans Leme & L.Kollmann
- Orthophytum riocontense Leme
- Orthophytum roseolilacinum Leme
- Orthophytum rubiginosum Leme
- Orthophytum rubrum L.B.Sm.
- Orthophytum sanctum L.B.Sm.
- Orthophytum santaritense Leme, S.Heller & Zizka
- Orthophytum santosianum Leme
- Orthophytum saxicola (Ule) L.B.Sm.
- Orthophytum schulzianum Leme & M.Machado
- Orthophytum striatifolium Leme & L.Kollmann
- Orthophytum sucrei H.Luther
- Orthophytum teofilo-otonense Leme & L.Kollmann
- Orthophytum toscanoi Leme
- Orthophytum triunfense J.A.Siqueira & Leme
- Orthophytum vagans M.B.Foster
- Orthophytum vasconcelosianum Leme
- Orthophytum viridissimum Leme
- Orthophytum zanonii Leme

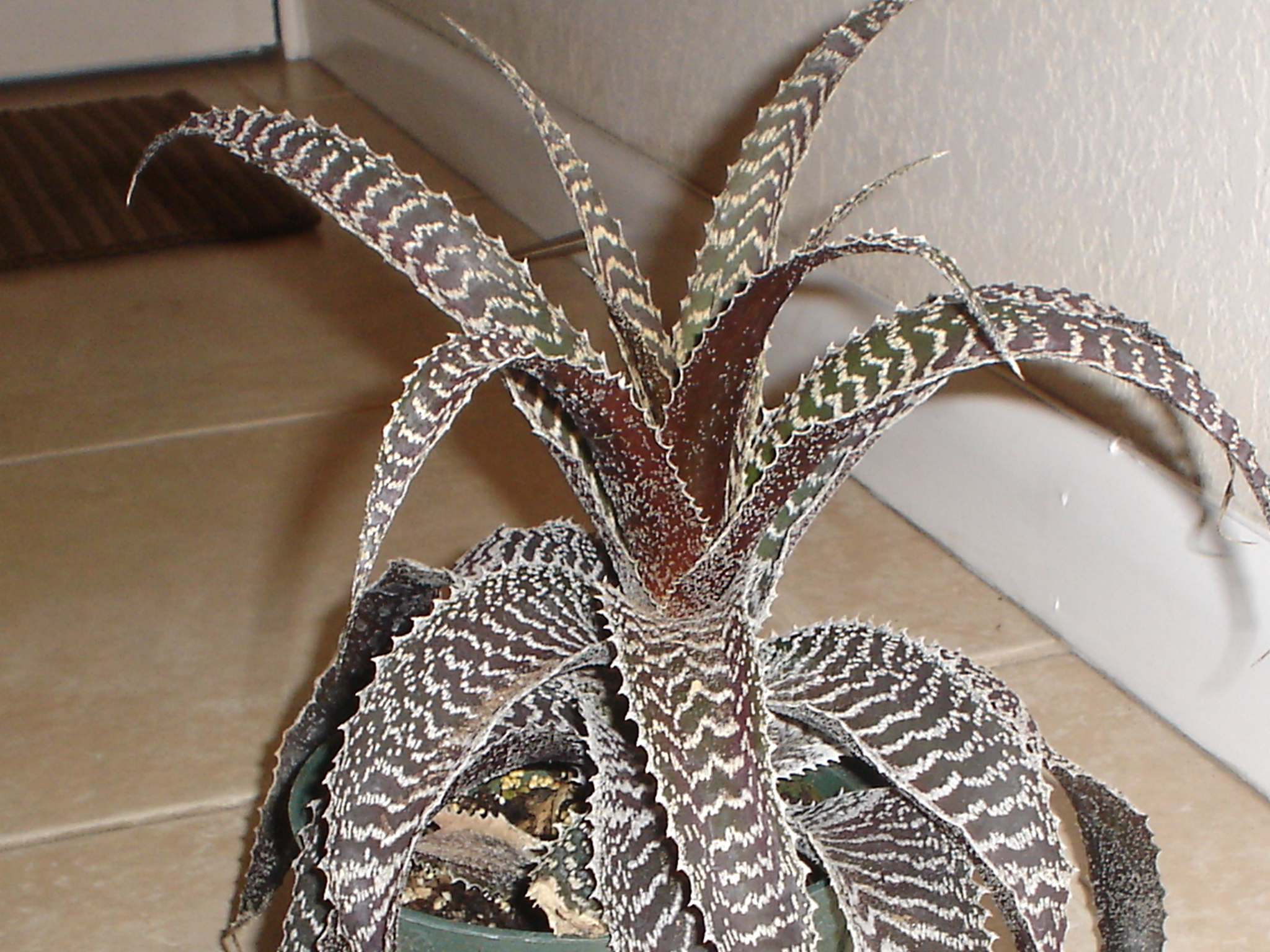
Cultivated Orthophytum gurkenii.

=== Transferred ===
Species transferred to other genera include:

- Orthophytum albopictum Philcox → Sincoraea albopicta
- Orthophytum amoenum (Ule) L.B.Sm. → Sincoraea amoena
- Orthophytum burle-marxii L.B.Sm. & R.W. Read → Sincoraea burle-marxii
- Orthophytum hatschbachii Leme → Sincoraea hatschbachii
- Orthophytum heleniceae Leme → Sincoraea heleniceae
- Orthophytum humile L.B.Sm. → Sincoraea humilis
- Orthophytum itambense (Versieux & Leme) Louzada & Versieux → Lapanthus itambensis
- Orthophytum mucugense Wanderley & Conceição → Sincoraea mucugensis
- Orthophytum navioides (L.B.Sm.) L.B.Sm. → Sincoraea navioides

== Selected cultivars and hybrids ==
Cultivars and hybrids cultivated as ornamental plants include:

- Orthophytum 'Andrea'
- Orthophytum 'Blaze'
- Orthophytum 'Brunswick'
- Orthophytum 'Clouds'
- Orthophytum 'Copper Penny'
- Orthophytum 'Donna Shaw'
- Orthophytum 'Iron Ore'
- Orthophytum 'Ivory Tower'
- Orthophytum 'Milagres'
- Orthophytum 'Mother Lode'
- Orthophytum 'Stardust'
- Orthophytum 'Starlights'
- Orthophytum 'Stellar Beauty'
- Orthophytum 'Warana'
- Orthophytum 'Warren Loose'
