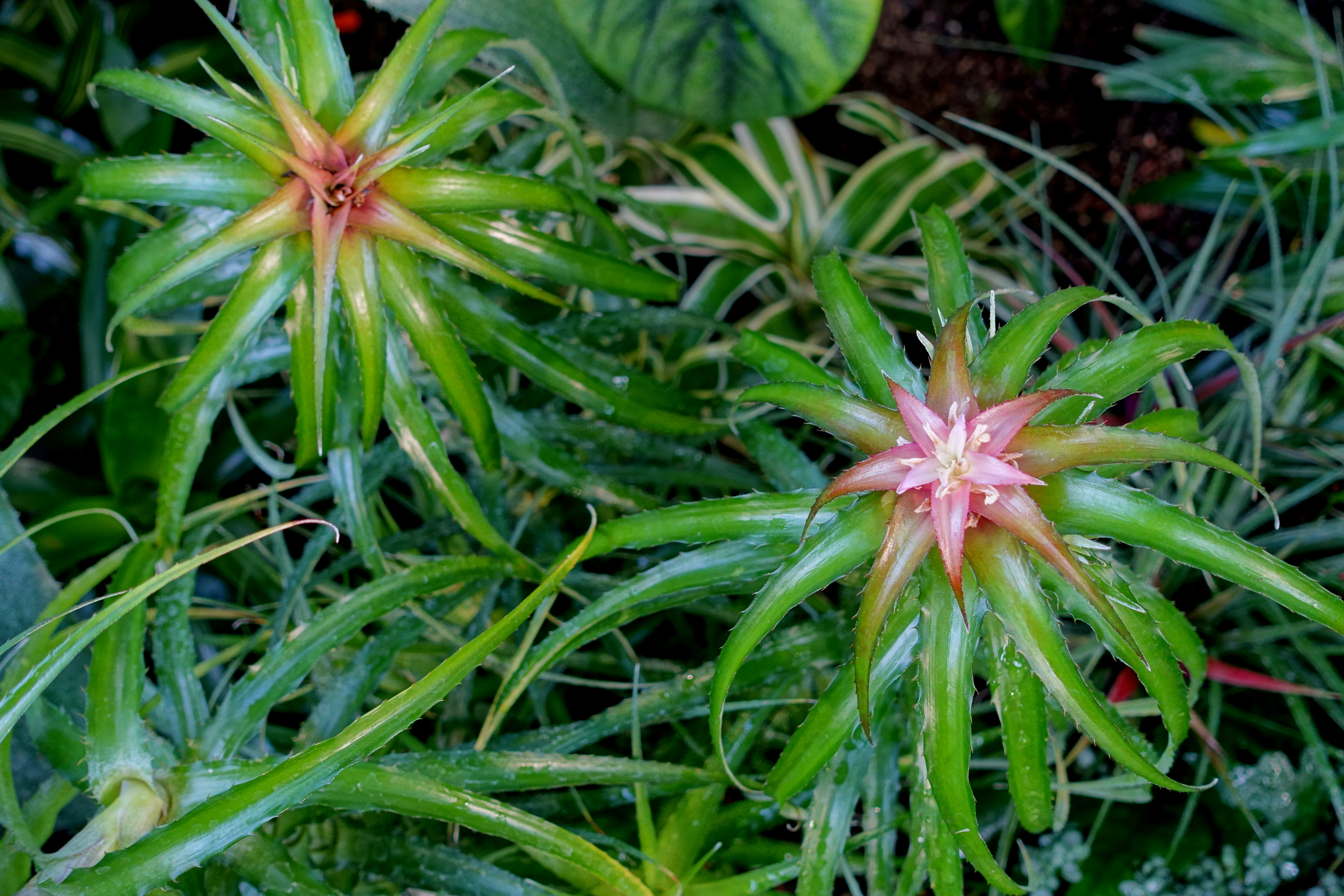

Scientific classification
- Kingdom: Plantae
- Clade: Tracheophytes
- Clade: Angiosperms
- Clade: Monocots
- Clade: Commelinids
- Order: Poales
- Family: Bromeliaceae
- Genus: Orthophytum
- Species: O. vagans

Binomial name
- Orthophytum vagans M.B. Foster

= Orthophytum vagans =

Species of flowering plant

Orthophytum vagans is a plant species in the genus Orthophytum.

The bromeliad is endemic to the Atlantic Forest biome (Mata Atlantica Brasileira) in Espírito Santo state, located in southeastern Brazil.

== Cultivars ==
- Orthophytum 'Blaze'
- Orthophytum 'Copper Penny'
- × Neophytum 'Hytime'
- × Ortholarium 'Hades'
