= Orthophytum jabrense =

Scientific classification
- Kingdom: Plantae
- Clade: Tracheophytes
- Clade: Angiosperms
- Clade: Monocots
- Clade: Commelinids
- Order: Poales
- Family: Bromeliaceae
- Genus: Orthophytum
- Species: O. jabrense

Binomial name
- Orthophytum jabrense G.S. Baracho & J.A. Siqueira

Species of flowering plant

Orthophytum jabrense is a plant species in the genus Orthophytum. This species is endemic to Brazil.
