= Orthophytum alvimii =

Scientific classification
- Kingdom: Plantae
- Clade: Tracheophytes
- Clade: Angiosperms
- Clade: Monocots
- Clade: Commelinids
- Order: Poales
- Family: Bromeliaceae
- Genus: Orthophytum
- Species: O. alvimii

Binomial name
- Orthophytum alvimii W.Weber

Species of flowering plant

Orthophytum alvimii is a plant species in the genus Orthophytum.

The bromeliad is endemic to the Atlantic Forest biome (Mata Atlantica Brasileira), located in southeastern Brazil.
