= Orthophytum lemei =

Scientific classification
- Kingdom: Plantae
- Clade: Tracheophytes
- Clade: Angiosperms
- Clade: Monocots
- Clade: Commelinids
- Order: Poales
- Family: Bromeliaceae
- Genus: Orthophytum
- Species: O. lemei

Binomial name
- Orthophytum lemei E. Pereira & I.A. Penna

Species of flowering plant

Orthophytum lemei is a plant species in the genus Orthophytum.

== Cultivars ==
- Orthophytum 'Cabernet'
- Orthophytum 'Stardust'
