= Orthophytum duartei =

Scientific classification
- Kingdom: Plantae
- Clade: Tracheophytes
- Clade: Angiosperms
- Clade: Monocots
- Clade: Commelinids
- Order: Poales
- Family: Bromeliaceae
- Genus: Orthophytum
- Species: O. duartei

Binomial name
- Orthophytum duartei L.B.Sm.

Species of flowering plant

Orthophytum duartei is a plant species in the genus Orthophytum.

The bromeliad is endemic to the Atlantic Forest biome (Mata Atlantica Brasileira), located in southeastern Brazil. It is native within the states of Espírito Santo and Minas Gerais.
