= Orthophytum glabrum =

Scientific classification
- Kingdom: Plantae
- Clade: Embryophytes
- Clade: Tracheophytes
- Clade: Spermatophytes
- Clade: Angiosperms
- Clade: Monocots
- Clade: Commelinids
- Order: Poales
- Family: Bromeliaceae
- Genus: Orthophytum
- Species: O. glabrum

Binomial name
- Orthophytum glabrum (Mez) Mez

Synonyms
- Homotypic Synonyms: Prantleia glabra Mez

Species of flowering plant

Orthophytum glabrum is a species of flowering plant in the family Bromeliaceae. This species is native to Brazil.

== Cultivars ==
- Orthophytum 'Cabernet'
