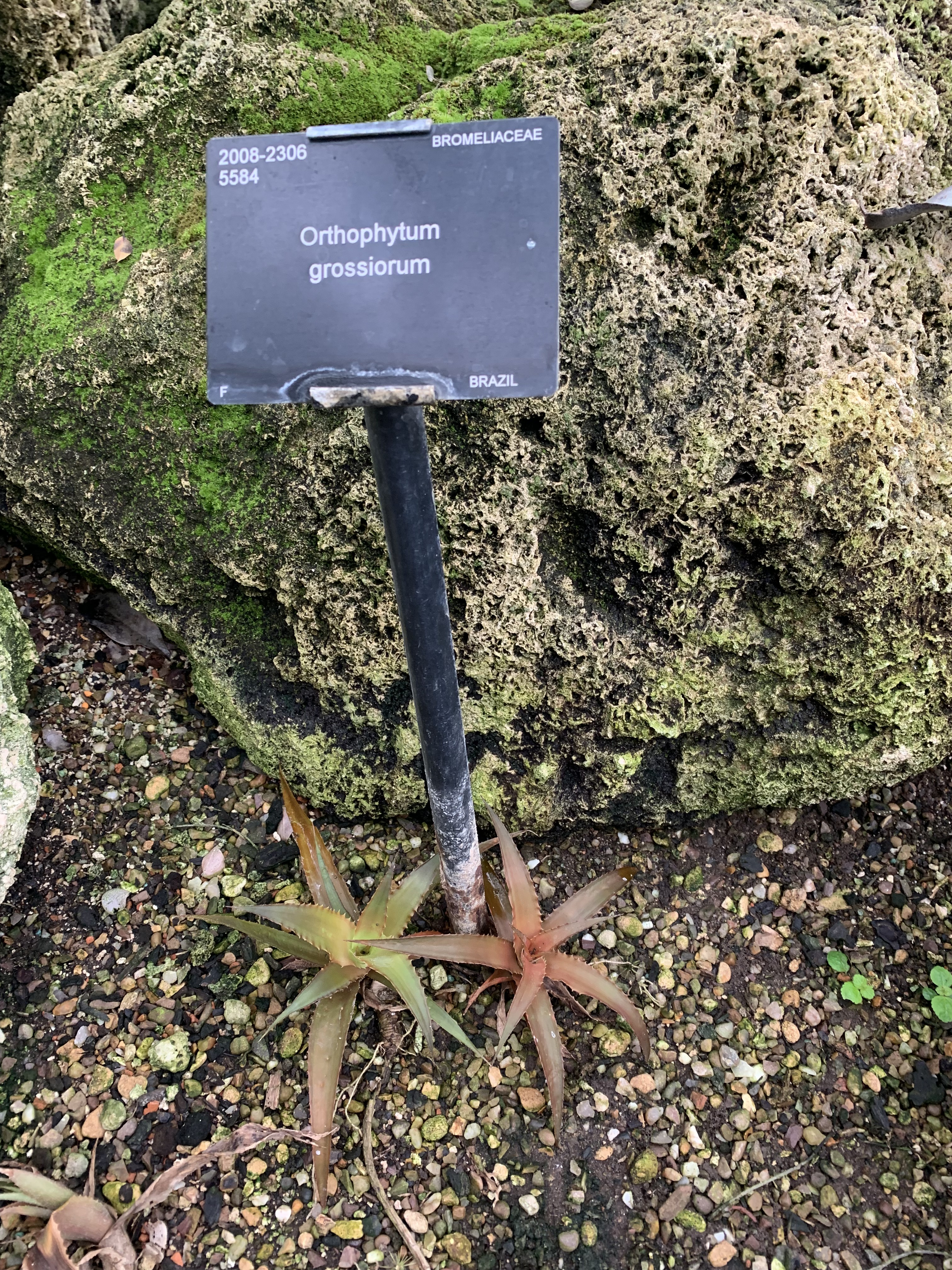

Scientific classification
- Kingdom: Plantae
- Clade: Tracheophytes
- Clade: Angiosperms
- Clade: Monocots
- Clade: Commelinids
- Order: Poales
- Family: Bromeliaceae
- Genus: Orthophytum
- Species: O. grossiorum

Binomial name
- Orthophytum grossiorum Leme & Paula

= Orthophytum grossiorum =

Species of flowering plant

Orthophytum grossiorum is a plant species in the genus Orthophytum. This species is endemic to Brazil.
