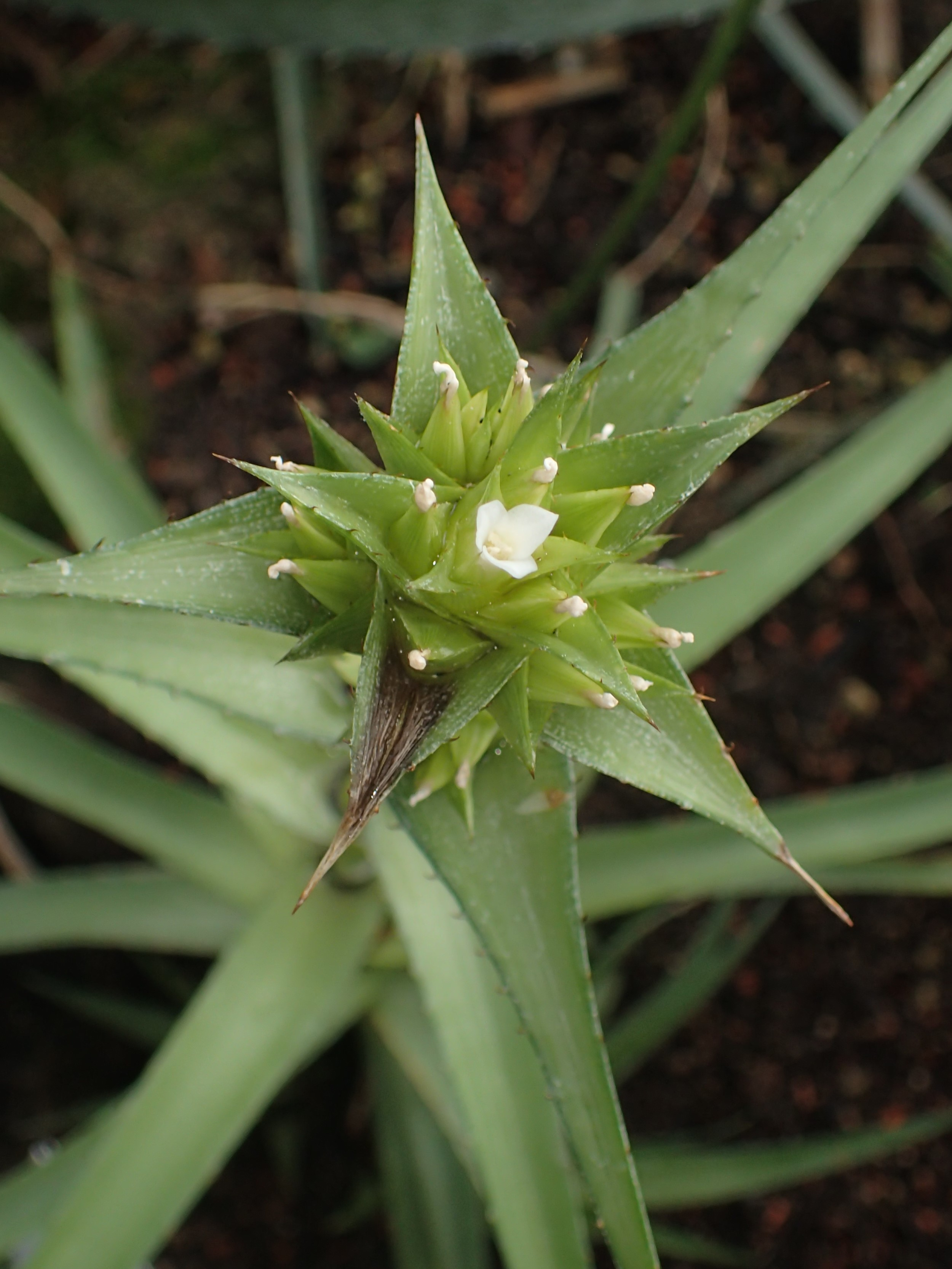

Scientific classification
- Kingdom: Plantae
- Clade: Tracheophytes
- Clade: Angiosperms
- Clade: Monocots
- Clade: Commelinids
- Order: Poales
- Family: Bromeliaceae
- Genus: Orthophytum
- Species: O. sanctum

Binomial name
- Orthophytum sanctum L.B.Sm.

= Orthophytum sanctum =

Species of flowering plant

Orthophytum sanctum is a plant species in the genus Orthophytum, endemic to Brazil.
