= Orthophytum atalaiense =

Scientific classification
- Kingdom: Plantae
- Clade: Tracheophytes
- Clade: Angiosperms
- Clade: Monocots
- Clade: Commelinids
- Order: Poales
- Family: Bromeliaceae
- Genus: Orthophytum
- Species: O. atalaiense

Binomial name
- Orthophytum atalaiense J.A.Siqueira & Leme

Species of flowering plant

Orthophytum atalaiense is a plant species in the genus Orthophytum.

The bromeliad is endemic to Alagoas state in the Atlantic Forest biome (Mata Atlantica Brasileira), located in southeastern Brazil.
