= Orthophytum lucidum =

Scientific classification
- Kingdom: Plantae
- Clade: Tracheophytes
- Clade: Angiosperms
- Clade: Monocots
- Clade: Commelinids
- Order: Poales
- Family: Bromeliaceae
- Genus: Orthophytum
- Species: O. lucidum

Binomial name
- Orthophytum lucidum Leme & H. Luther

Species of flowering plant

Orthophytum lucidum is a plant species in the genus Orthophytum. This species is native to Brazil.
