= Orthophytum magalhaesii =

Scientific classification
- Kingdom: Plantae
- Clade: Tracheophytes
- Clade: Angiosperms
- Clade: Monocots
- Clade: Commelinids
- Order: Poales
- Family: Bromeliaceae
- Genus: Orthophytum
- Species: O. magalhaesii

Binomial name
- Orthophytum magalhaesii L.B.Sm.

Species of flowering plant

Orthophytum magalhaesii is a plant species in the genus Orthophytum. This species is endemic to Brazil.

== Cultivars ==
- Orthophytum 'Iron Ore'
- Orthophytum 'Mother Lode'

== Description ==
Orthophytum magalhaesii - A terrestrial saxicolous (growing on rock) bromeliad to 2 feet tall with thick stems holding attractive lanceolate leaves that are brown with scurfy silver hairs and white teeth along the margins. These stems are topped with attractive "flower heads" of green bracts that nearly hide the small white flowers in their interior. This plant grows well in full sun along the coast but likely would appreciate part sun or light shade in hot inland. Plant in a well-drained mix where it is fairly dry growing but responds well to regular to occasional irrigation. Has proven hardy to short duration temperatures around 28°F. An unusual plant that makes a very attractive specimen in a pot or in the ground with compatible succulent plants. This plant is endemic to the Atlantic Forest biome in Brazil where it is known to grow on granite rock outcrops in the states of Minas Gerais and Espírito Santo. It was described by Lyman Smith Phytologia in 1966. Orthophytum is in the subgenus Bromelioideae and the name of the genus comes from the Greek word 'ortho' meaning "straight" and the Latin word 'phytum' meaning "plant" in reference to the long straight inflorescence bearing leaves. The specific epithet honors the botanist Geraldo Mendes Magalhães who first collected the type specimen of this plant in 1958.
