= Orthophytum compactum =

Scientific classification
- Kingdom: Plantae
- Clade: Tracheophytes
- Clade: Angiosperms
- Clade: Monocots
- Clade: Commelinids
- Order: Poales
- Family: Bromeliaceae
- Genus: Orthophytum
- Species: O. compactum

Binomial name
- Orthophytum compactum L.B.Sm.

Species of flowering plant

Orthophytum compactum is a plant species in the genus Orthophytum.

The bromeliad is endemic to the Atlantic Forest biome (Mata Atlantica Brasileira) within Minas Gerais state, located in southeastern Brazil.
