= Orthophytum sucrei =

Scientific classification
- Kingdom: Plantae
- Clade: Tracheophytes
- Clade: Angiosperms
- Clade: Monocots
- Clade: Commelinids
- Order: Poales
- Family: Bromeliaceae
- Genus: Orthophytum
- Species: O. sucrei

Binomial name
- Orthophytum sucrei H. Luther

Species of flowering plant

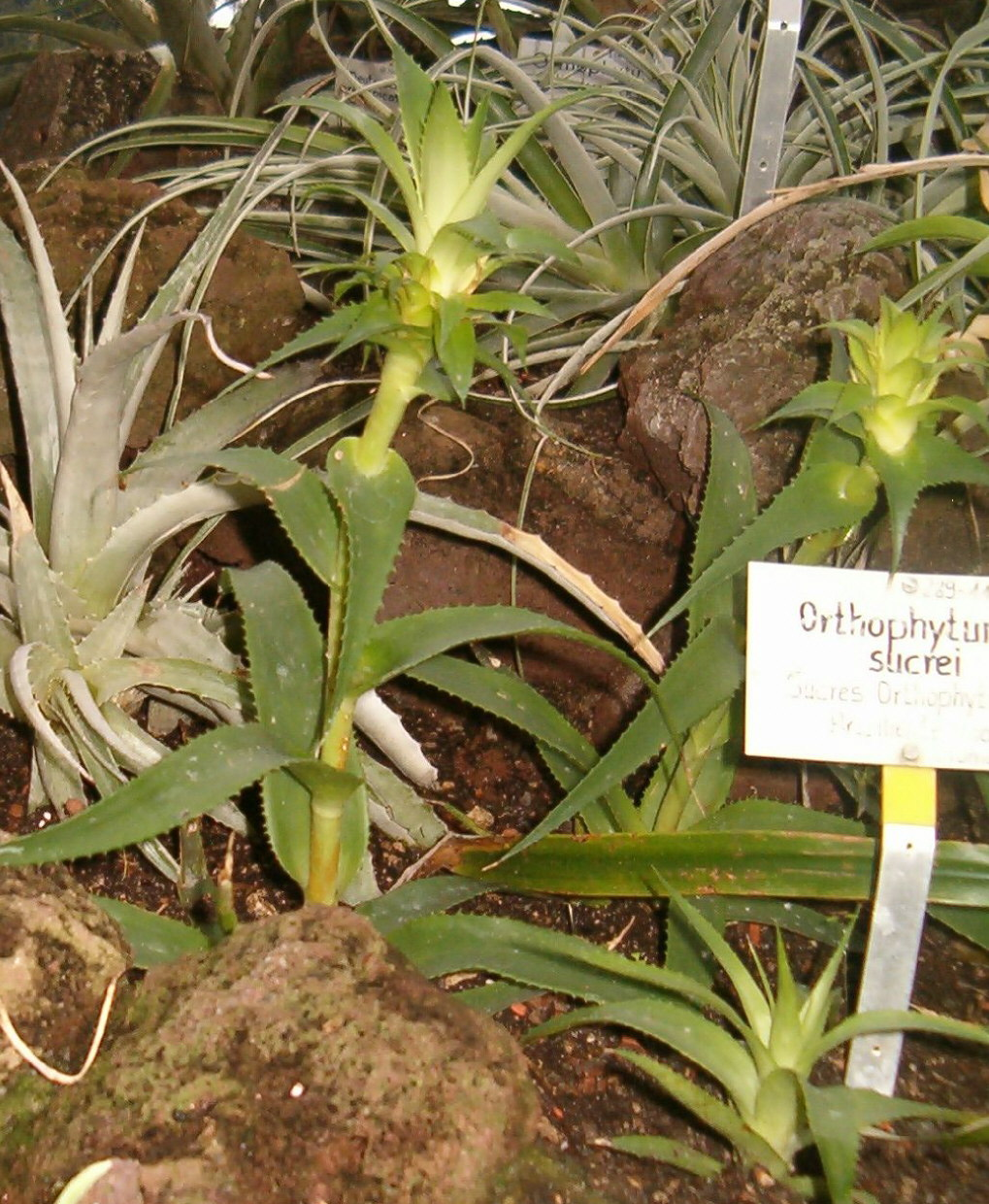
Orthophytum sucrei in Botanical Gardens Berlin Dahl

Orthophytum sucrei is a plant species in the genus of Orthophytum.

The bromeliad is endemic to the Atlantic Forest biome (Mata Atlantica Brasileira) in the Bahia state, which is located in southeastern Brazil.

== Cultivars ==
- Orthophytum 'Starlights'
