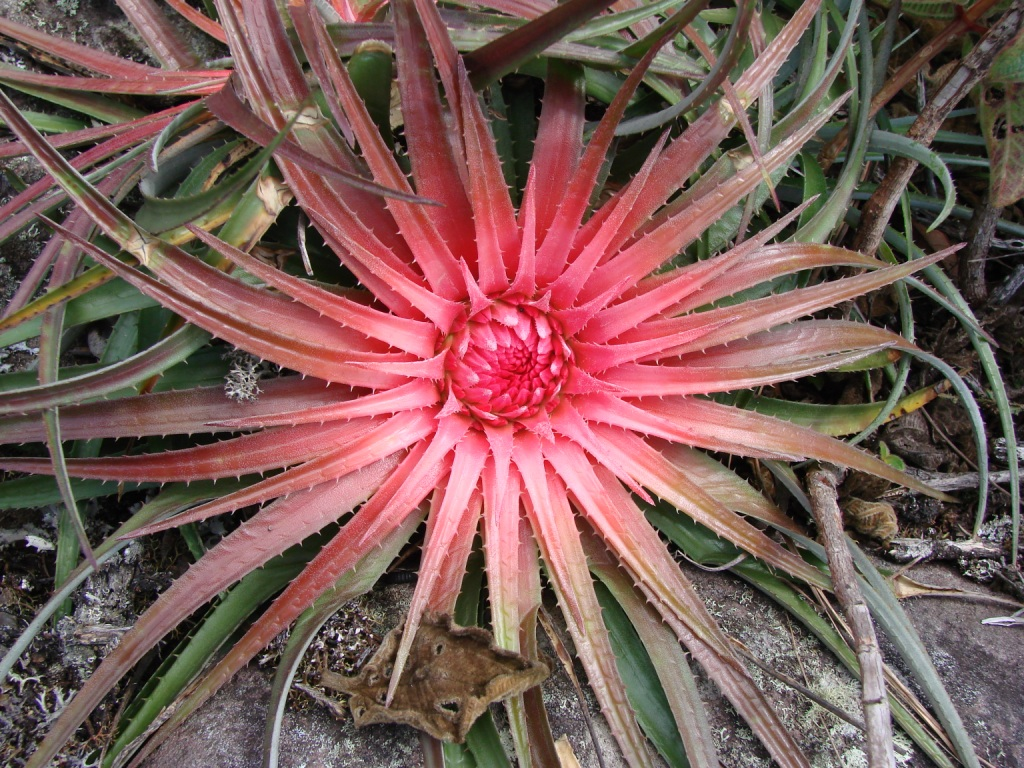
- Sincoraea amoena

Scientific classification
- Kingdom: Plantae
- Clade: Tracheophytes
- Clade: Angiosperms
- Clade: Monocots
- Clade: Commelinids
- Order: Poales
- Family: Bromeliaceae
- Subfamily: Bromelioideae
- Genus: Sincoraea; Ule

Type species
- Sincoraea amoena

Species
- See text.

= Sincoraea =

Genus of plants

Sincoraea is a genus of flowering plant in the family Bromeliaceae, native to eastern Brazil (the states of Bahia and Minas Gerais). The genus was erected by Ernst Ule in 1908.

== Species ==
As of January 2023, Plants of the World Online accepted the following species:

Image	Scientific name	Distribution
	Sincoraea albopicta (Philcox) Louzada & Wand.	Brazil (Bahia)
	Sincoraea amoena Ule	Brazil (Bahia)
	Sincoraea burle-marxii (L.B.Sm. & Read) Louzada & Wand.	Brazil (Bahia)
	Sincoraea hatschbachii (Leme) Louzada & Wand.	Brazil (Bahia)
	Sincoraea heleniceae (Leme) Louzada & Wand.	Brazil (Bahia)
	Sincoraea humilis (L.B.Sm.) Louzada & Wand.	Brazil (Minas Gerais)
	Sincoraea mucugensis (Wand. & A.A.Conc.) Louzada & Wand.	Brazil (Bahia)
	Sincoraea navioides (L.B.Sm.) Louzada & Wand.	Brazil (Bahia)
	Sincoraea ophiuroides (Louzada & Wand.) Louzada & Wand.	Brazil (Bahia)
	Sincoraea rafaelii (Leme) Louzada & Wand.	Brazil (Bahia)
	Sincoraea ulei (Louzada & Wand.) Louzada & Wand.	Brazil (Bahia)
