= Orthophytum fosterianum =

Scientific classification
- Kingdom: Plantae
- Clade: Tracheophytes
- Clade: Angiosperms
- Clade: Monocots
- Clade: Commelinids
- Order: Poales
- Family: Bromeliaceae
- Genus: Orthophytum
- Species: O. fosterianum

Binomial name
- Orthophytum fosterianum L.B.Sm.

Species of flowering plant

Orthophytum fosterianum is a plant species in the genus Orthophytum. This species is endemic to Brazil.

== Cultivars ==
- Orthophytum 'Clouds'
