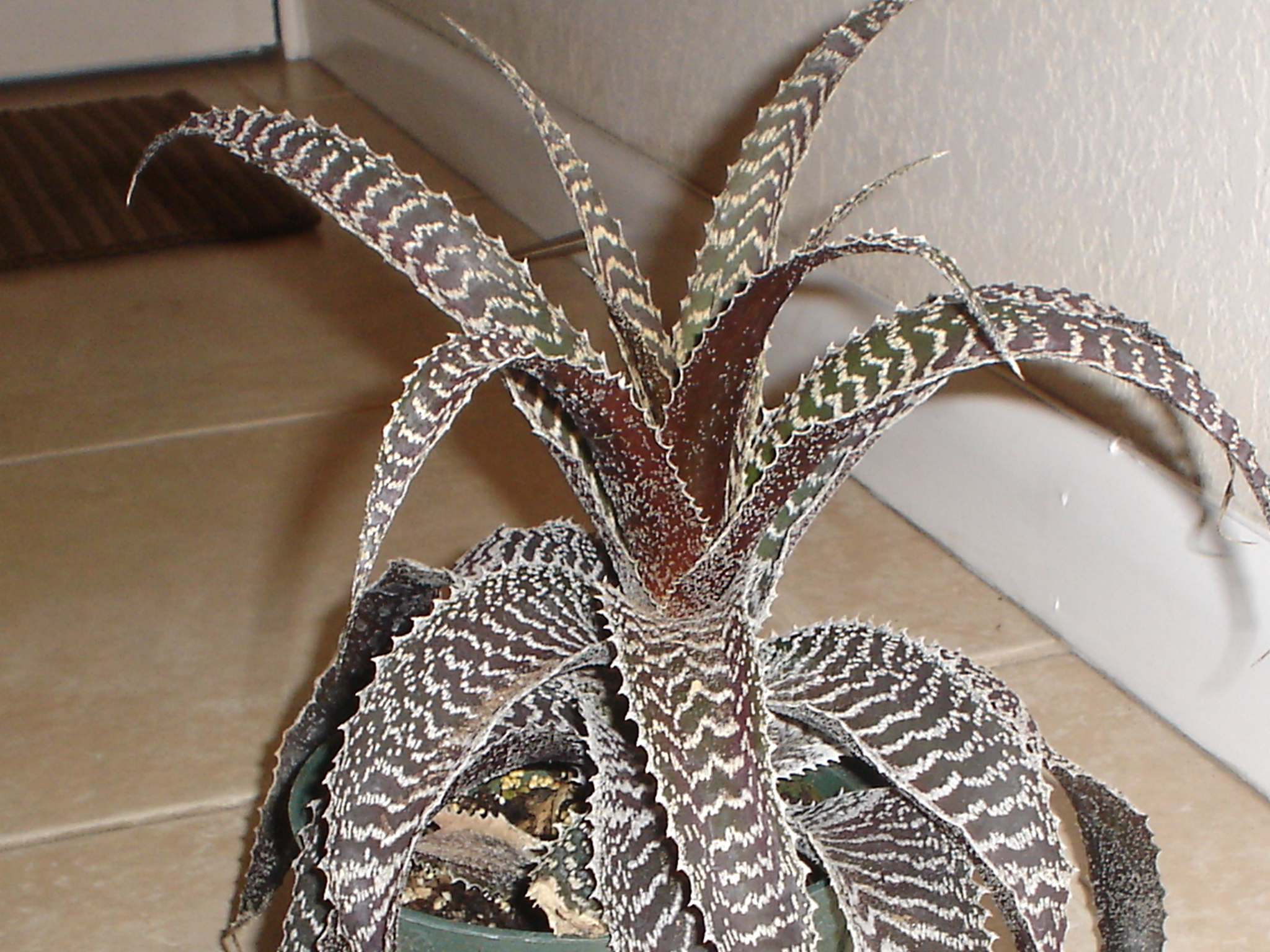

Scientific classification
- Kingdom: Plantae
- Clade: Tracheophytes
- Clade: Angiosperms
- Clade: Monocots
- Clade: Commelinids
- Order: Poales
- Family: Bromeliaceae
- Genus: Orthophytum
- Species: O. gurkenii

Binomial name
- Orthophytum gurkenii Hutchison

= Orthophytum gurkenii =

Species of flowering plant

Orthophytum gurkenii is a plant species in the genus Orthophytum.

The bromeliad is endemic to the Atlantic Forest biome (Mata Atlantica Brasileira) within Minas Gerais state, located in southeastern Brazil.

== Cultivars and hybrids ==
Cultivars and hybrids include:

- Orthophytum 'Clouds'
- Orthophytum 'Hatsumi Maertz'
- Orthophytum 'Mother Lode'
- Orthophytum 'Stardust'
- Orthophytum 'Starlights'
- Orthophytum 'Warren Loose'
