= Orthophytum leprosum =

Scientific classification
- Kingdom: Plantae
- Clade: Embryophytes
- Clade: Tracheophytes
- Clade: Spermatophytes
- Clade: Angiosperms
- Clade: Monocots
- Clade: Commelinids
- Order: Poales
- Family: Bromeliaceae
- Genus: Orthophytum
- Species: O. leprosum

Binomial name
- Orthophytum leprosum (Mez) Mez

Synonyms
- Homotypic Synonyms: Prantleia leprosa Mez

Species of flowering plant

Orthophytum leprosum is a species of flowering plant in the family Bromeliaceae. This species is endemic to Brazil.
