= Orthophytum rubrum =

Scientific classification
- Kingdom: Plantae
- Clade: Tracheophytes
- Clade: Angiosperms
- Clade: Monocots
- Clade: Commelinids
- Order: Poales
- Family: Bromeliaceae
- Genus: Orthophytum
- Species: O. rubrum

Binomial name
- Orthophytum rubrum L.B.Sm.

Species of flowering plant

Orthophytum rubrum is a plant species in the genus Orthophytum.

The bromeliad is endemic to the Atlantic Forest biome (Mata Atlantica Brasileira) in Bahia state, located in southeastern Brazil.

== Cultivars ==
- × Neophytum 'Yum Yum'
