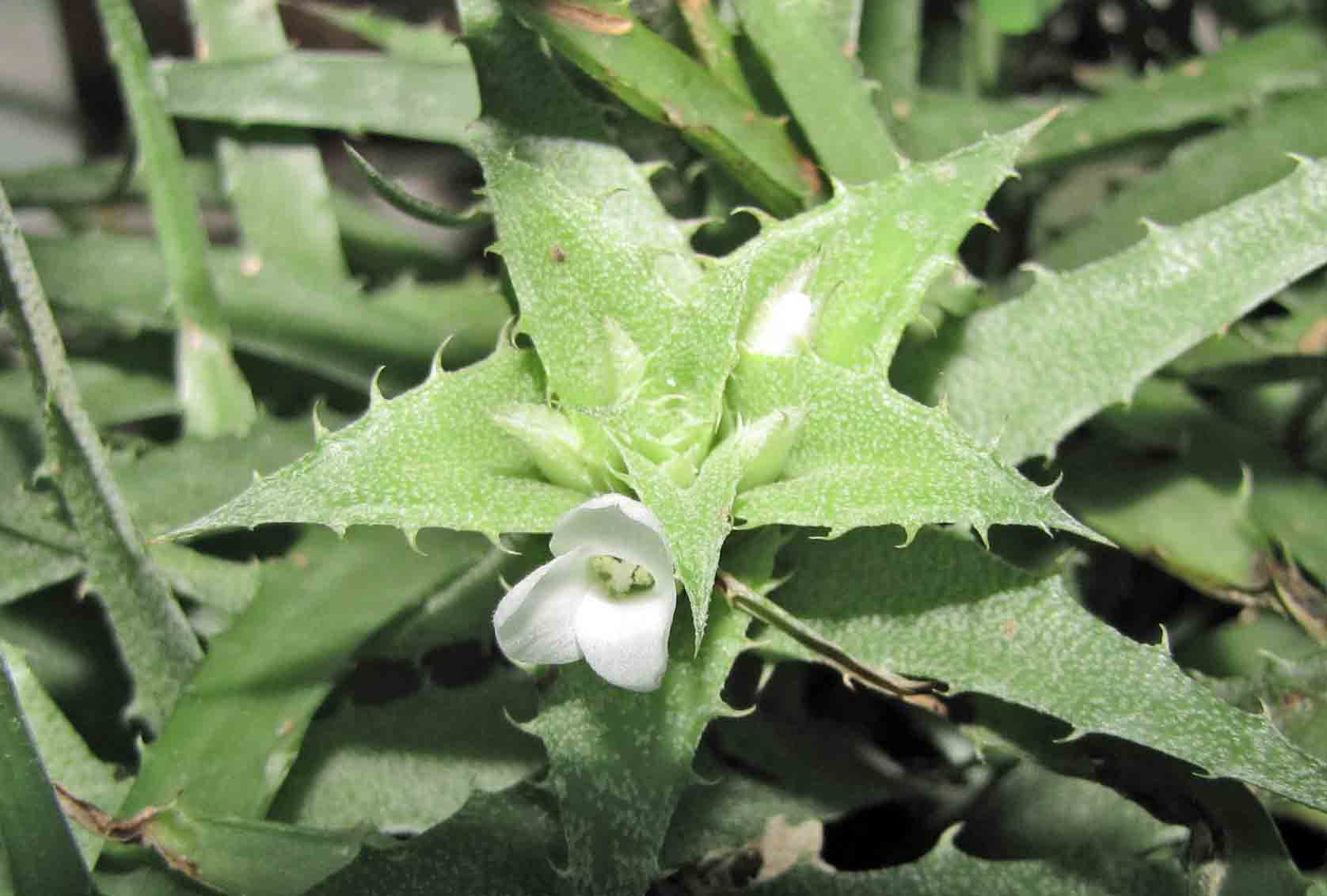

Scientific classification
- Kingdom: Plantae
- Clade: Tracheophytes
- Clade: Angiosperms
- Clade: Monocots
- Clade: Commelinids
- Order: Poales
- Family: Bromeliaceae
- Genus: Orthophytum
- Species: O. saxicola

Binomial name
- Orthophytum saxicola (Ule) L.B.Sm.

= Orthophytum saxicola =

Species of flowering plant

Orthophytum saxicola is a plant species in the genus Orthophytum.

The bromeliad is endemic to the Atlantic Forest biome (Mata Atlantica Brasileira) in Bahia state, located in southeastern Brazil.

== Cultivars ==
- Orthophytum 'Copper Penny'
- Orthophytum 'Hatsumi Maertz'
- Orthophytum 'Huntington'
- Orthophytum 'Verde'
- × Orthomea 'Pure Delight'
