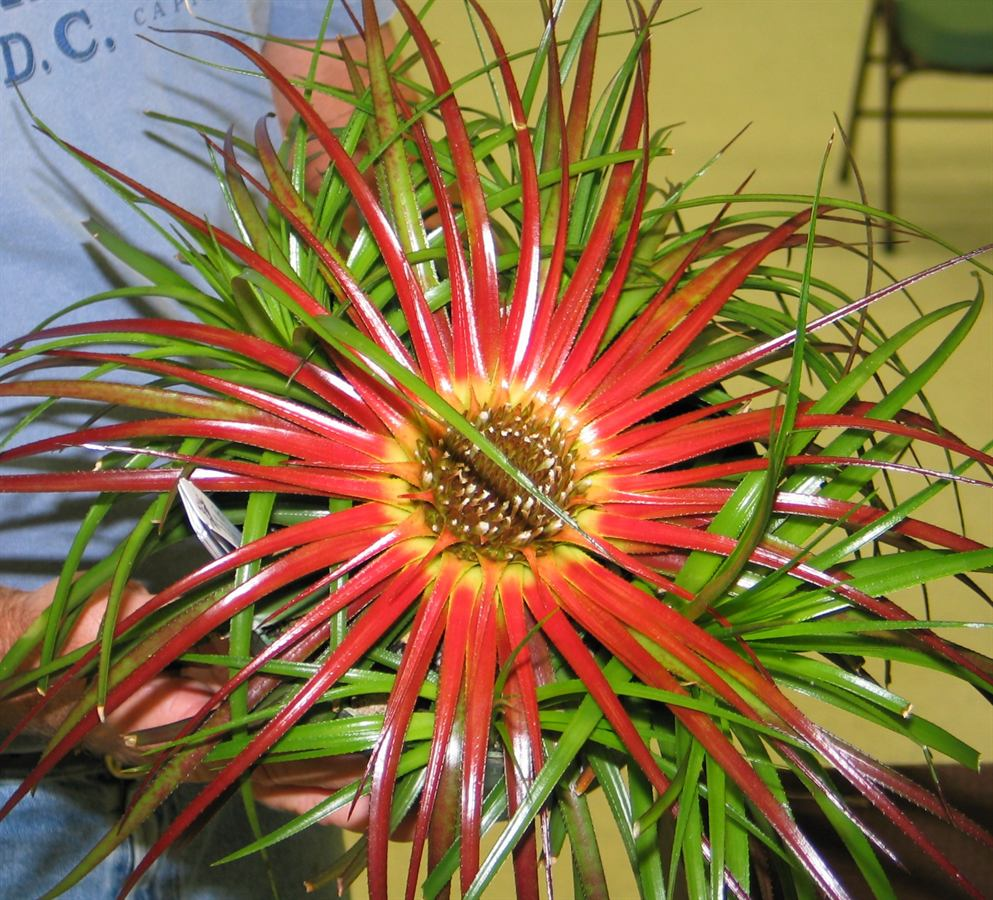

Scientific classification
- Kingdom: Plantae
- Clade: Tracheophytes
- Clade: Angiosperms
- Clade: Monocots
- Clade: Commelinids
- Order: Poales
- Family: Bromeliaceae
- Subfamily: Bromelioideae
- Genus: Sincoraea
- Species: S. heleniceae

Binomial name
- Sincoraea heleniceae (Leme) Louzada & Wand.

Synonyms
- Orthophytum heleniceae Leme

= Sincoraea heleniceae =

Species of flowering plant in Brazil

Sincoraea heleniceae is a species of flowering plant in the family Bromeliaceae, native to Brazil (the state of Bahia). It was first described in 2004 as Orthophytum heleniceae.
