= Sincoraea navioides =

Scientific classification
- Kingdom: Plantae
- Clade: Tracheophytes
- Clade: Angiosperms
- Clade: Monocots
- Clade: Commelinids
- Order: Poales
- Family: Bromeliaceae
- Subfamily: Bromelioideae
- Genus: Sincoraea
- Species: S. navioides

Binomial name
- Sincoraea navioides (L.B.Sm.) Louzada & Wand.

Synonyms
- Cryptanthopsis navioides L.B.Sm.; Orthophytum navioides (L.B.Sm.) L.B.Sm.

Species of flowering plant

Sincoraea navioides is a species of flowering plant in the family Bromeliaceae, native to Brazil (the state of Bahia). It was first described by Lyman Bradford Smith in 1940 as Cryptanthopsis navioides.
