= List of Passiflora species =

This is a list of species in the botanical genus Passiflora. There are in excess of 550 species mostly occurring in the Neotropics, but with a few species in the Nearctic and some others in Asia and Australasia. The list is incomplete.

== A ==
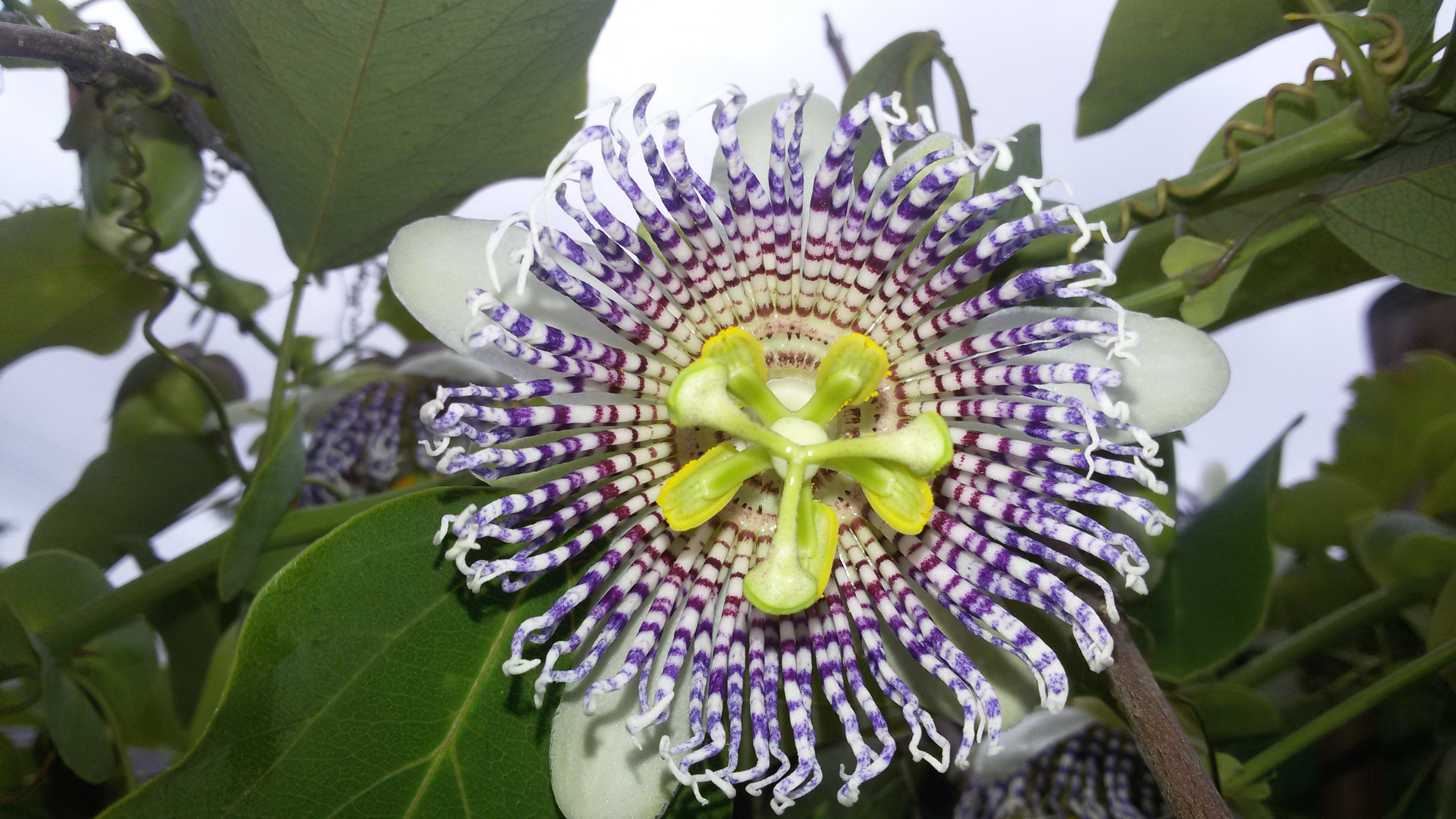
Passiflora actinia

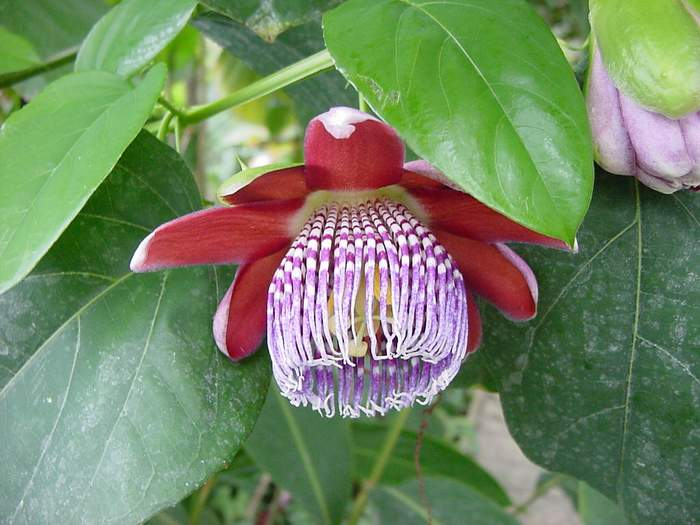
Winged-stem passion flower (Passiflora alata)

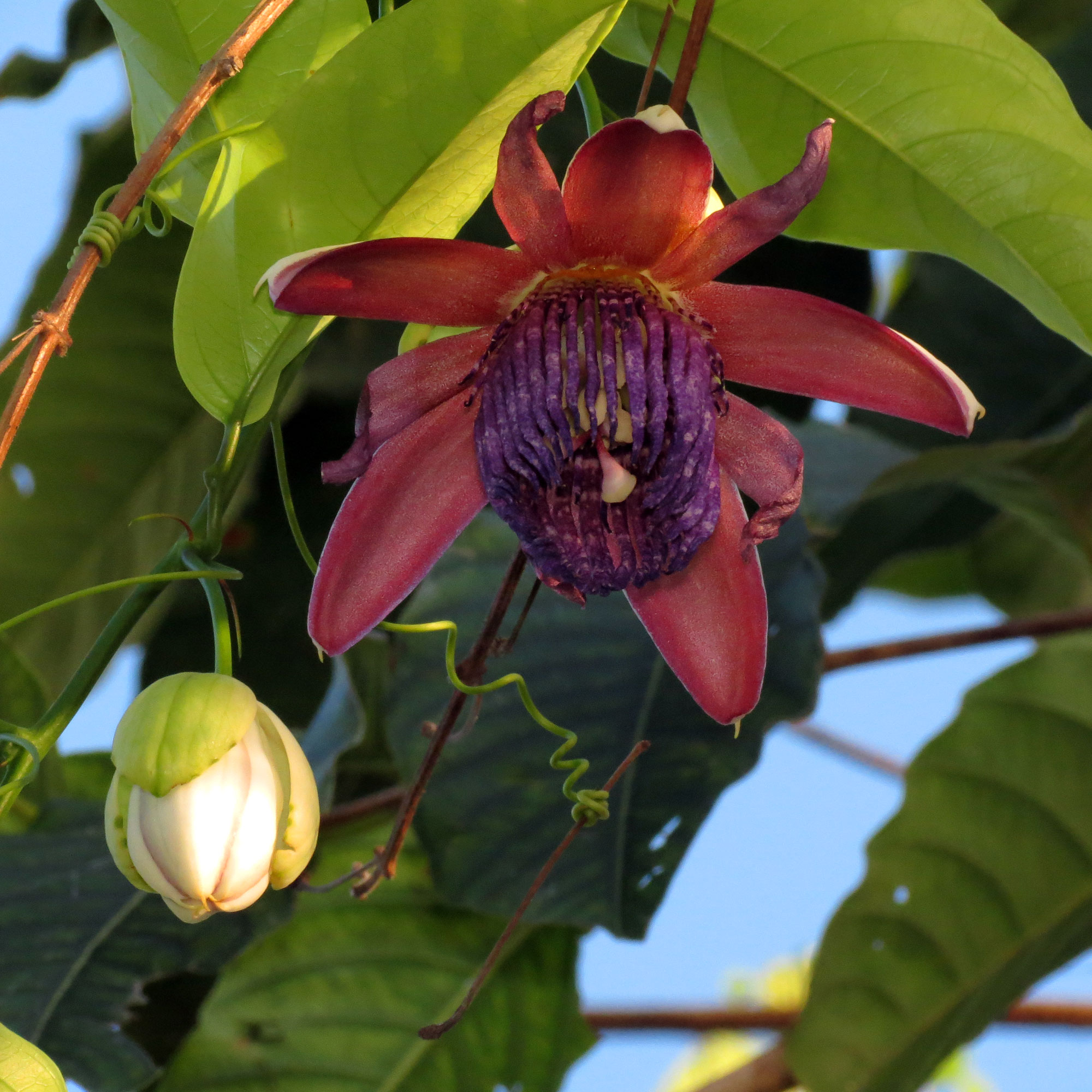
Passiflora ambigua

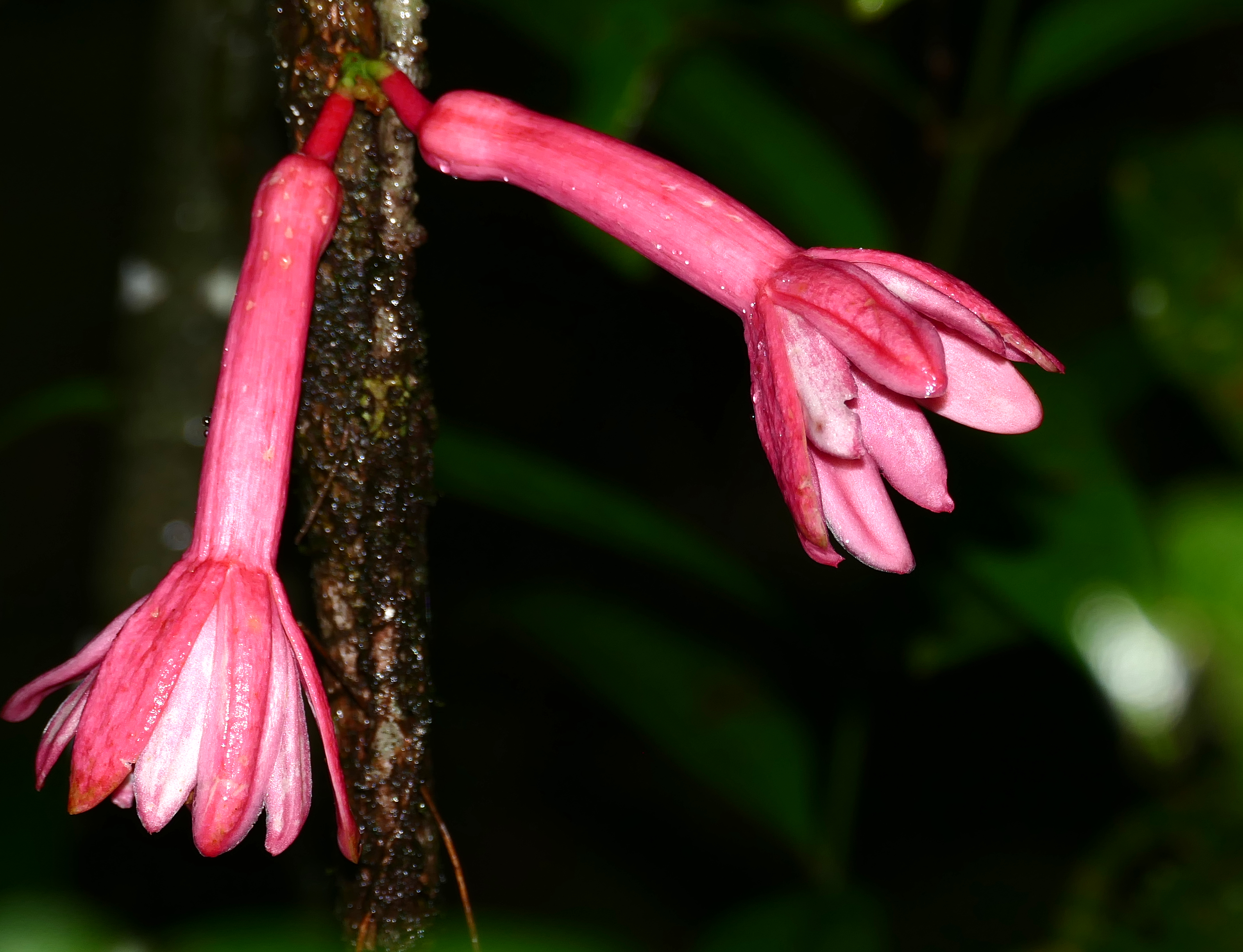
Passiflora amoena

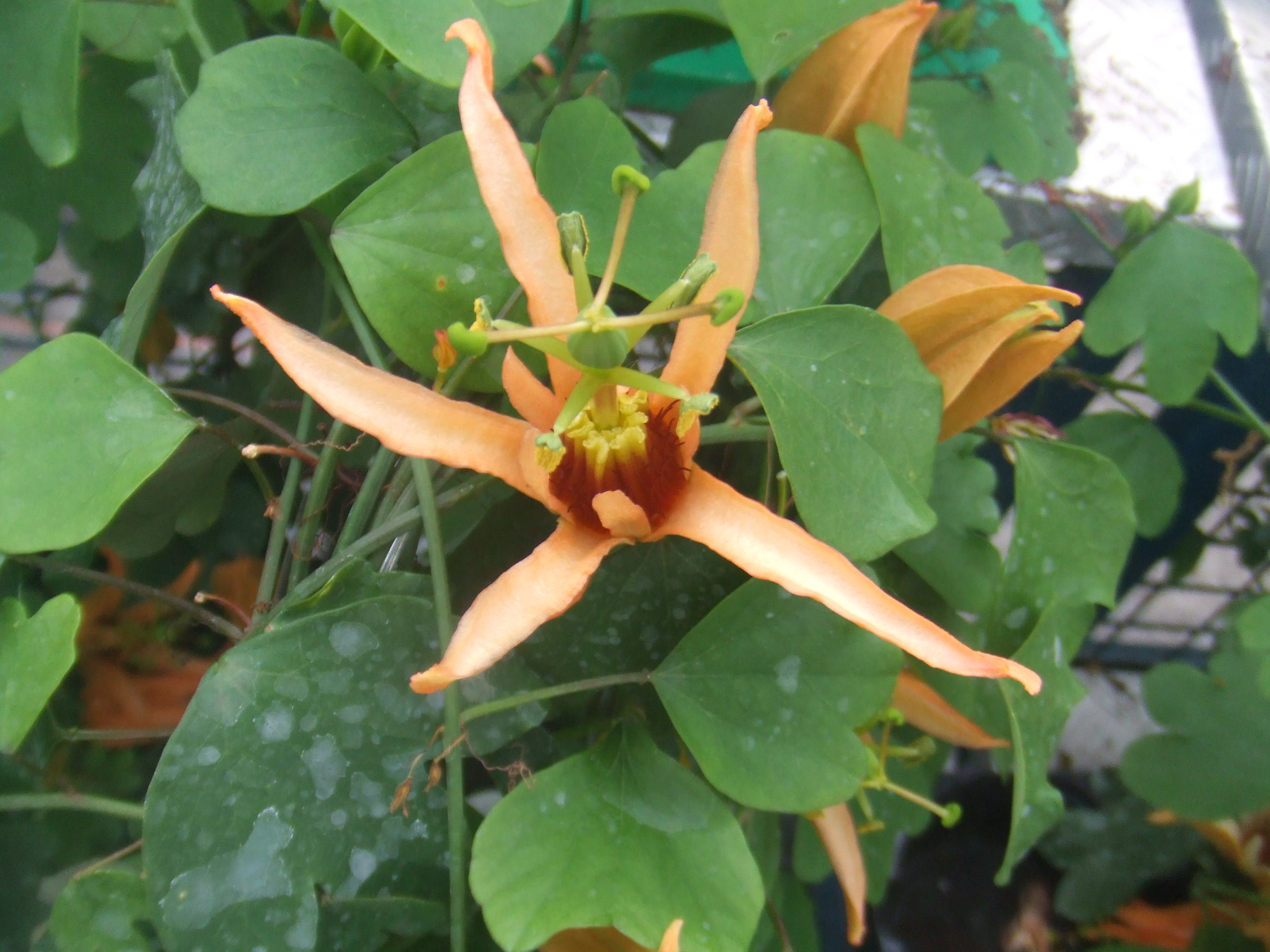
Passiflora aurantia

- Passiflora acreana Mezzonato & Silveira discovered in Brazil in 2023
- ‡ Passiflora actinia Hook. – sea anemone passion flower
- Passiflora acuminata DC.
- Passiflora adenophylla Mast.
- ‡ Passiflora adenopoda DC.
- Passiflora adulterina L.fil.
- Passiflora affinis Engelm.
- Passiflora aimae Annonay & Feuillet
- ‡ Passiflora alata Curtis – winged-stem passion flower, ouvaca
- Passiflora allantophylla Mast. ex Donn.Sm.
- Passiflora allardii Lynch
- Passiflora alnifolia Kunth
- ¤ Passiflora altebilobata Hemsl.
- Passiflora amabilis Hook.
- Passiflora amalocarpa Barb.Rodr.
- Passiflora amazonica L.K.Escobar
- ‡ Passiflora ambigua Hemsl. ex Hook.f.
- Passiflora amethystina J.C.Mikan
- Passiflora amicorum Wurdack, grows in Venezuela
- Passiflora amoena L.K.Escobar
- ‡ Passiflora ampullacea Harms
- Passiflora anadenia Urb.
- Passiflora anastomosans (Lamb. ex DC.) Kilip
- Passiflora andersonii DC.
- Passiflora andina (H.Karst.) Killip
- Passiflora andreana Mast. synonym for Passiflora harlnigii?
- Passiflora anfracta Mast. & André
- Passiflora angusta Feuillet & J.M.MacDougal, grown in prts of northern South America
- ‡ Passiflora antioquiensis H.Karst
- Passiflora apetala Killip
- Passiflora apoda Harms
- Passiflora araguensis L.K.Escobar
- Passiflora araujoi Sacco
- Passiflora arbelaezii L.Uribe
- Passiflora arborea Spreng.
- ‡ Passiflora arida (Mast. & Rose) Killip
- Passiflora aristulata Mast.
- Passiflora arizonica (Killip) D.H.Goldman
- Passiflora ascidia Feuillet
- ¤ Passiflora aurantia G.Forst.
- Passiflora aurantioides (K.Schum.) Krosnick
- Passiflora auriculata Kunth

== B ==
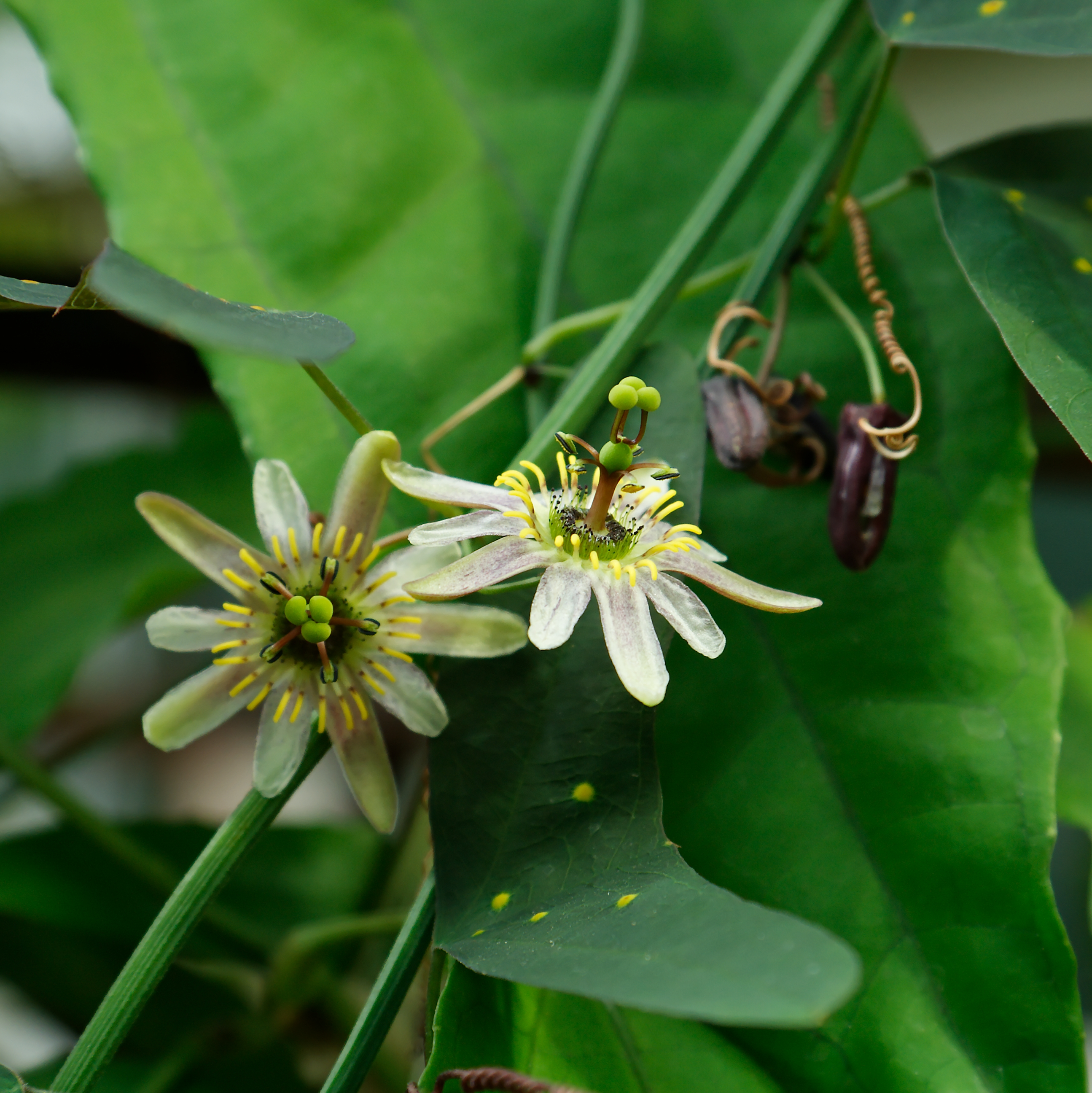
- Two flowered passion flower (Passiflora biflora)
  Passiflora bacabensis Mezzonato, Silva & Oliveira
- Passiflora bahamensis Britton
- Passiflora bahiensis Klotzsch
- Passiflora balbis Feuillet
- Passiflora barclayi (Seem.) Mast.
- Passiflora baueri (Lindl.) Mast
- Passiflora bauhiniifolia Kunth
- Passiflora bernaccii Mezzonato
- Passiflora berteroana Balb. ex DC.
- Passiflora bicornis Mill.
- Passiflora bicrura Urb.
- Passiflora bicuspidata (H.Karst.) Mast.
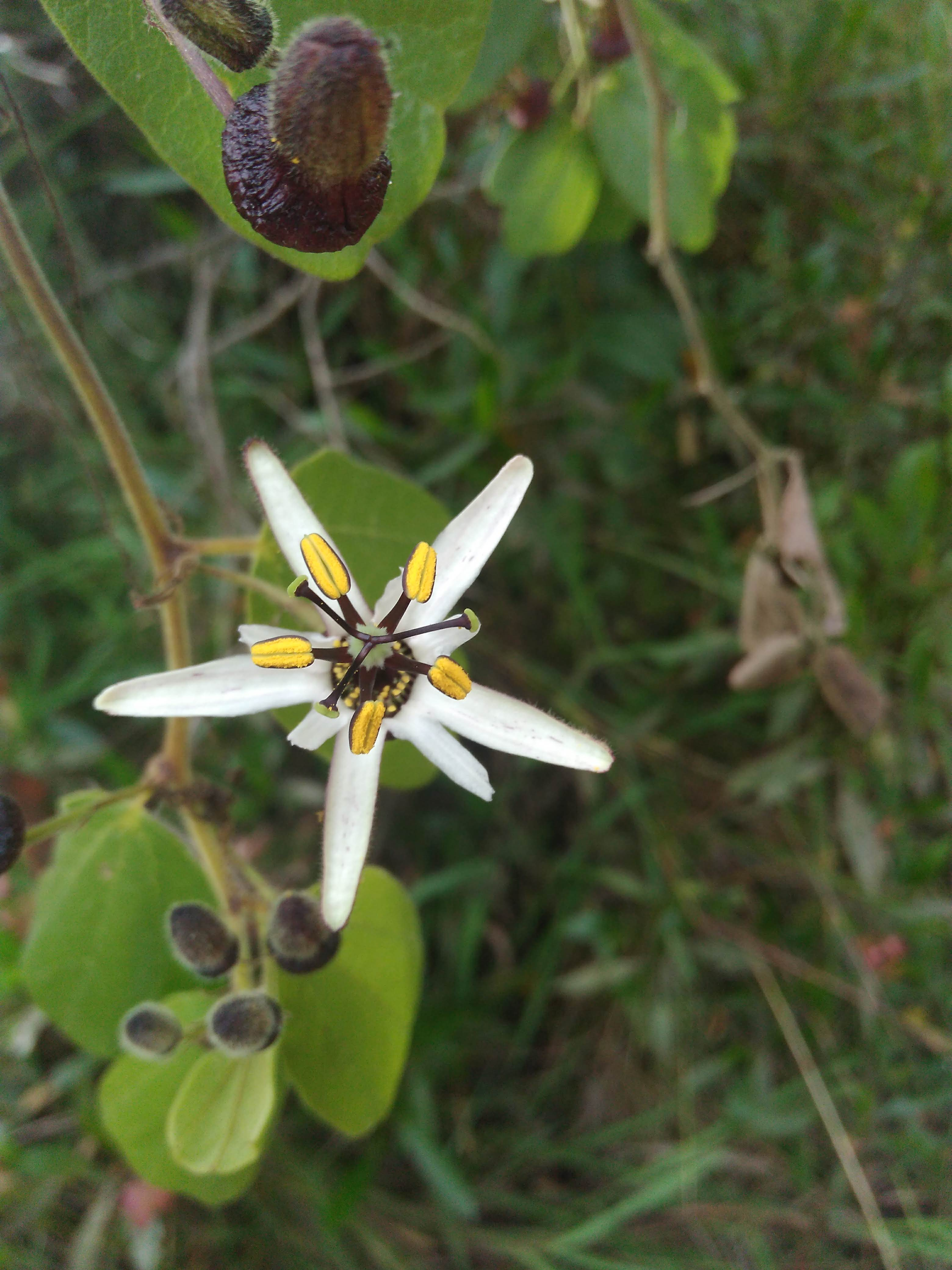
  Passiflora bogotensis
- Passiflora biflora Lam. – two-flowered passion flower
- Passiflora bilobata Juss.
- Passiflora boenderi J.M.MacDougal
- Passiflora bogotensis Benth
- Passiflora boticarioana Cervi
- Passiflora brachyantha L.K.Escobar
- Passiflora bracteosa Planch. and Linden ex Triana and Planch
- Passiflora brevifila Killip
- Passiflora bryonioides Kunth – cupped passion flower
- Passiflora bucaramangensis Killip
- Passiflora buchtienii Killip

== C ==
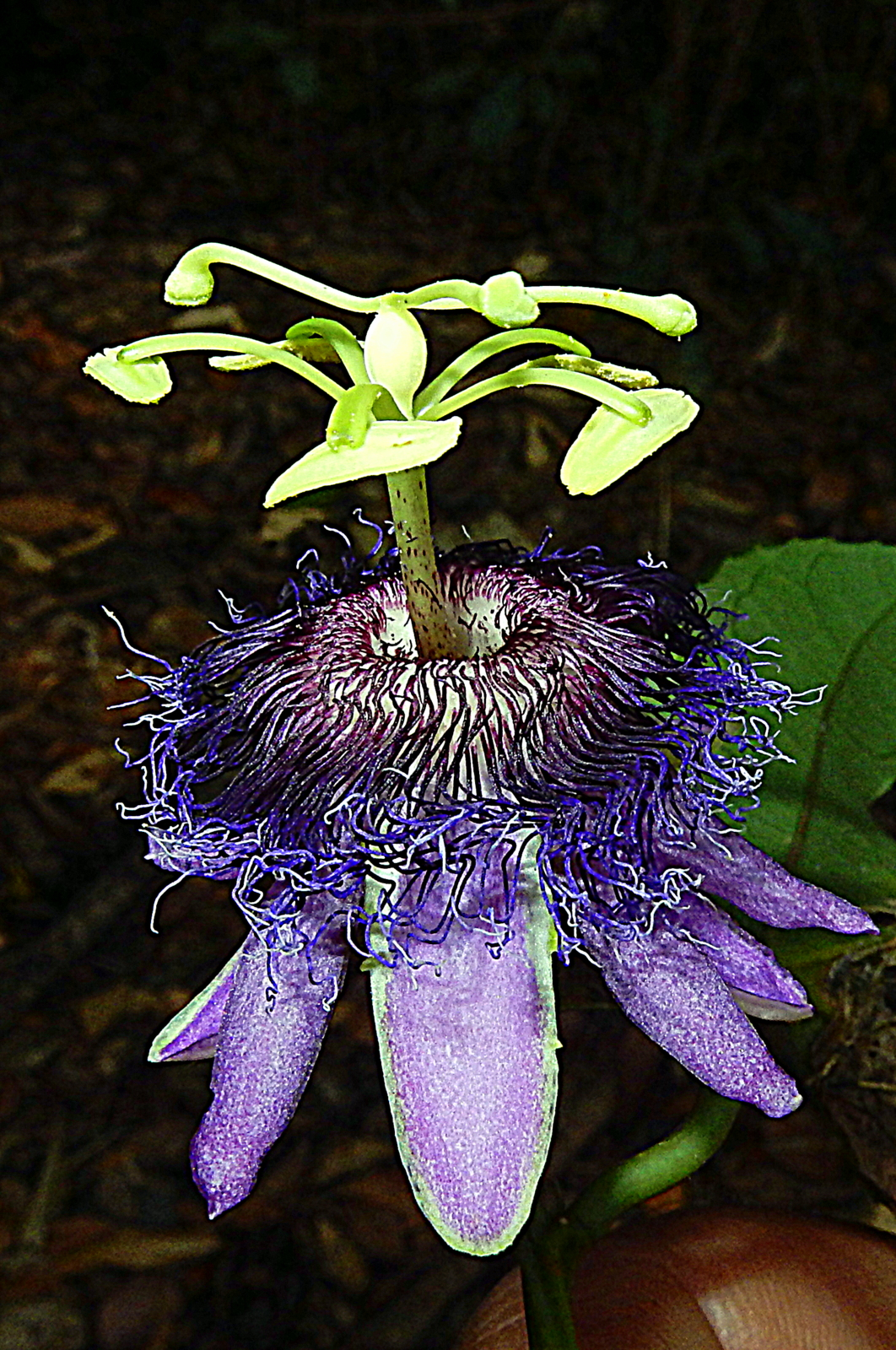
- Passiflora cacao
  Passiflora cacao Bernacci & M.M. Souza
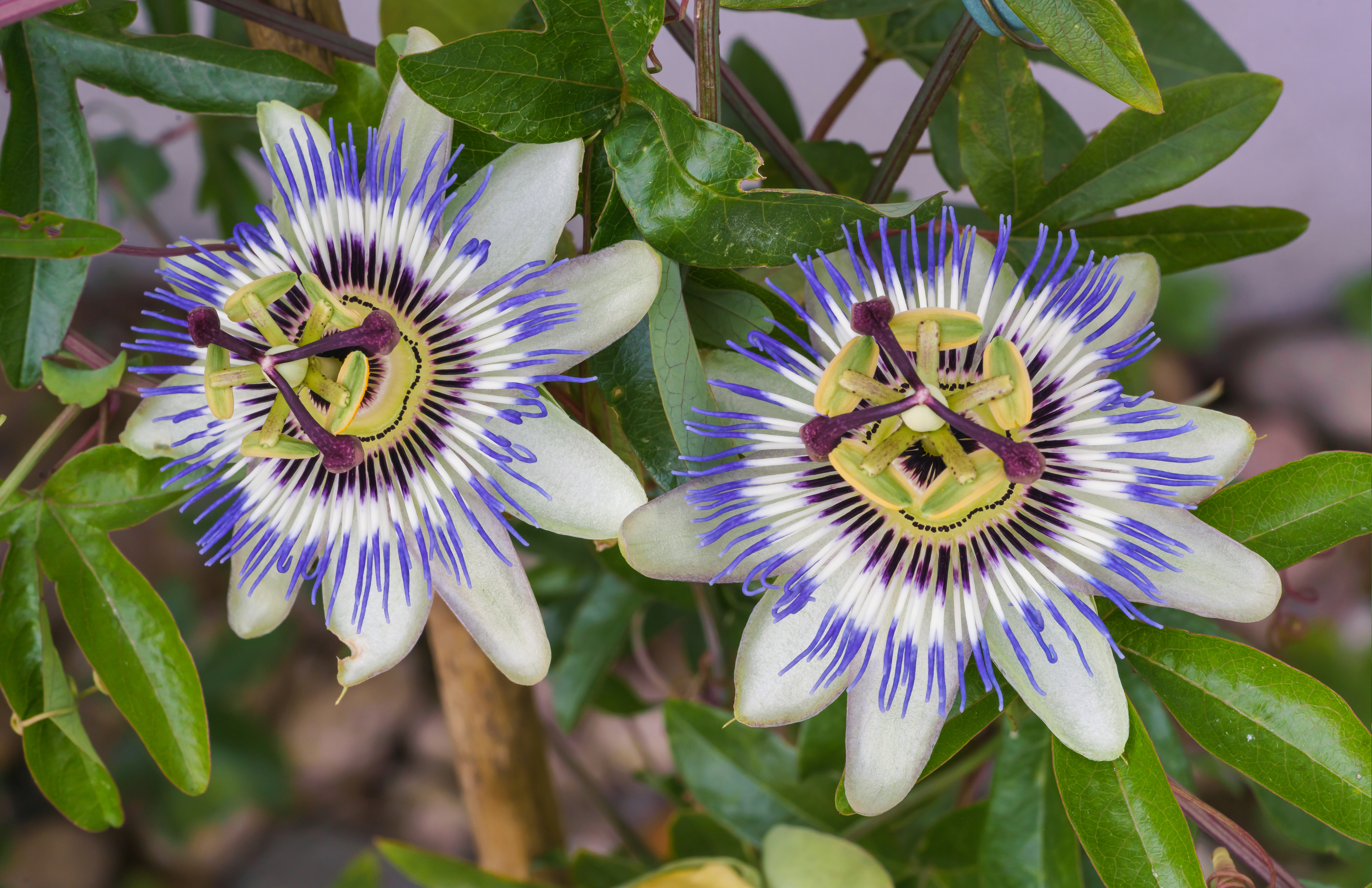
- Passiflora caerulea
  ‡ Passiflora caerulea L. – blue passion flower, common passion flower
- Passiflora campanulata Mast.
- Pasaiflora candida (Poepp. & Endl.) Mast.
- Passiflora candollei Triana and Planch.
- Passiflora canescens Killip
- Passiflora capparidifolia Killip
- Passiflora capsularis L. – red granadilla
- Passiflora cardonae Killip
- Passiflora castellanosii Sacco
- Passiflora catharinensis Sacco
- Passiflora cauliflora Harms
- Passiflora cerasina Annonay & Feuillet
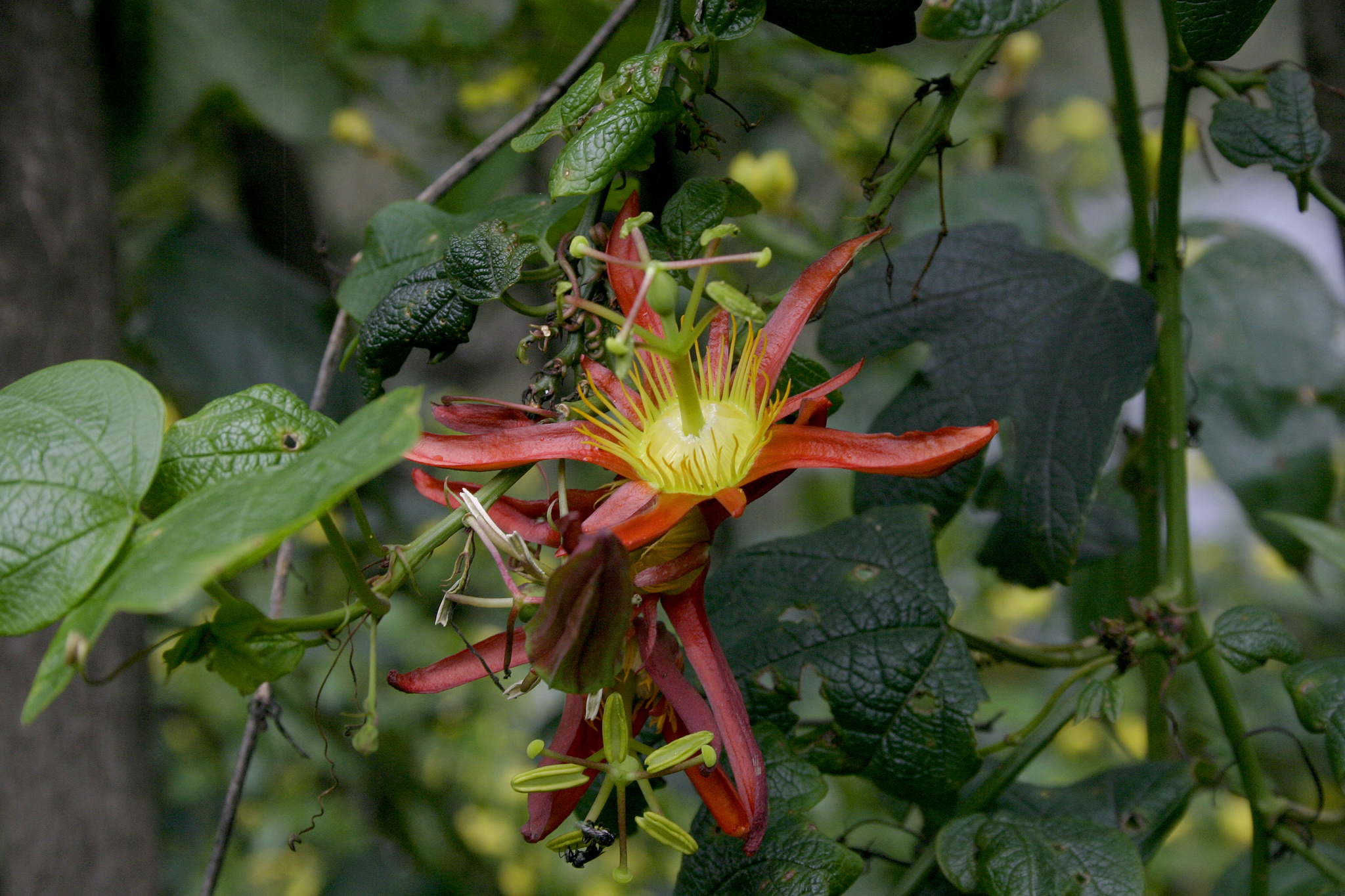
- Passiflora cinnabarina
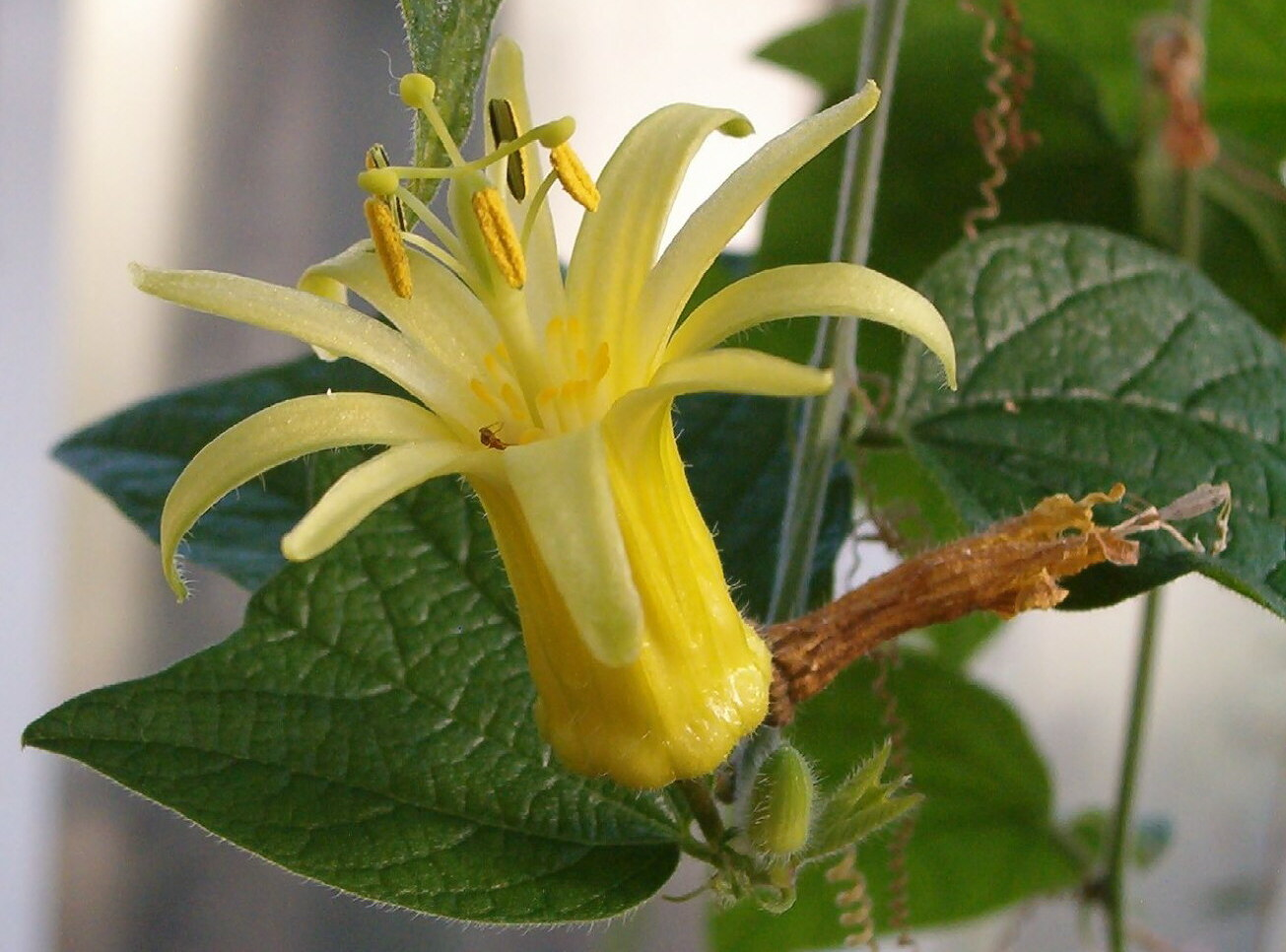
  Lemon-yellow passion flower, Passiflora citrina
  Passiflora ceratocarpa F. Silveira
- Passiflora cervii M.L. Milward de Azevedo
- Passiflora chaparensis R. Vásquez
- Passiflora chelidonea Mast.
- Passiflora chlorina L.K.Escobar
- Passiflora chocoensis G. Gerlach & Ulmer
- Passiflora choconiana S. Watson
- Passiflora chrysophylla Chodat
- Passiflora chrysosepala Schwerdtf.
- Passiflora ciliata Aiton – fringed passionflower
- Passiflora cincinnata Mast.
- ¤ Passiflora cinnabarina Lindl.
- Passiflora cirrhiflora A.Juss.
- Passiflora cirrhipes Killip
- Passiflora cissampeloides J.M.MacDougal
- Passiflora citrifolia Salisb.
- Passiflora citrina J.M.MacDougal – lemon-yellow passion flower
- Passiflora clathrata Mast.
- Passiflora clypeophylla Mast.
- Passiflora coactilis Killip
- Passiflora cobanensis Killip
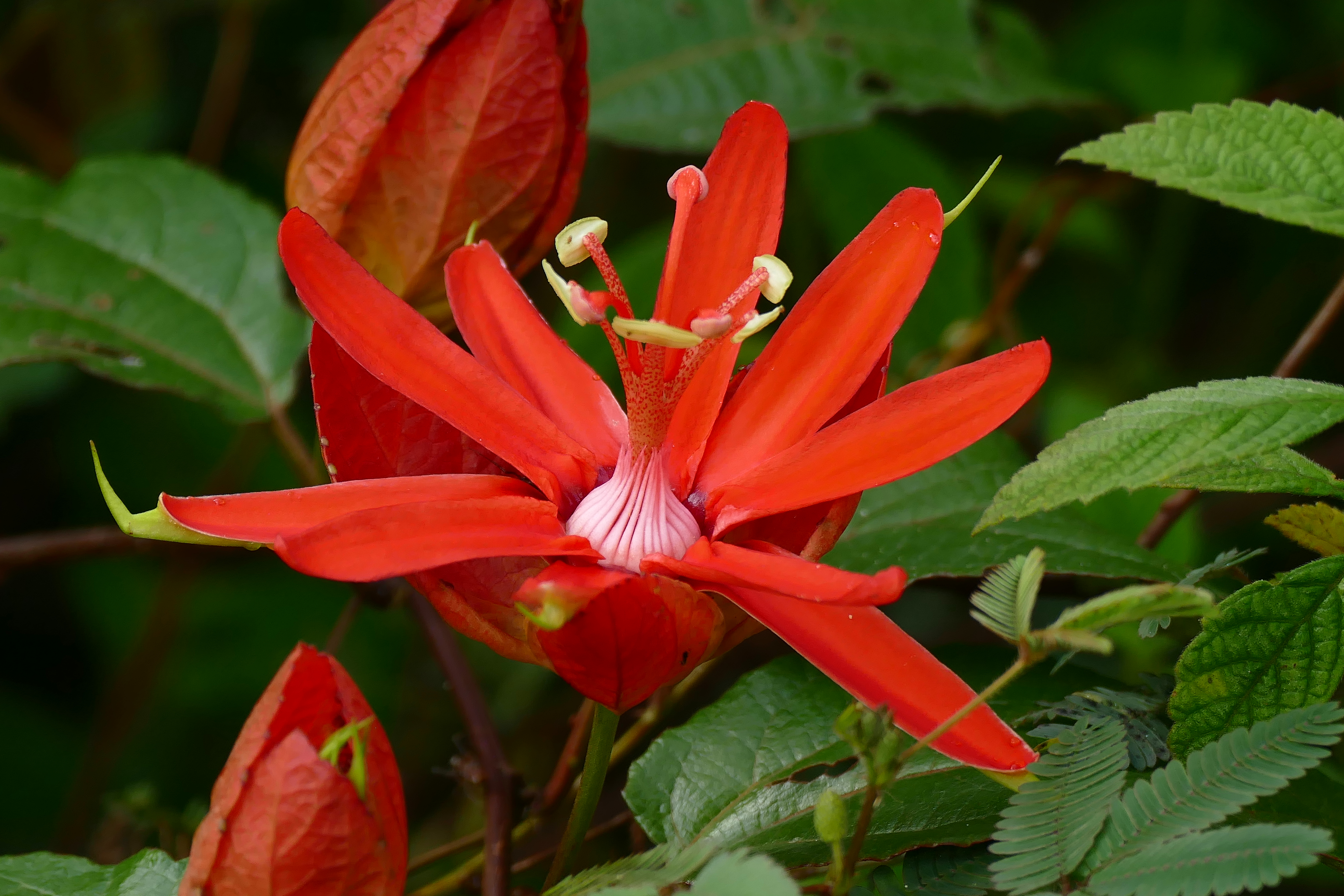
- Passiflora coccinea
  ‡ Passiflora coccinea Aubl. – Red granadilla
- ¤ Passiflora cochinchinensis Spreng.
- Passiflora cocuyensis M. Molinari
- Passiflora colimensis Mast. & Rose ex Rose
- Passiflora colinvauxii Wiggins
- Passiflora colombiana L.K. Escobar
- Passiflora compar Feuillet
- Passiflora complanata J.M.MacDougal in edit
- Passiflora contracta Vitta
- Passiflora conzattiana Killip
- Passiflora cookii Killip
- Passiflora cordistipula Cervi
- Passiflora coriacea Juss.
- Passiflora cornuta Mast.
- Passiflora costaricensis Killip
- Passiflora costata Mast.
- Passiflora crassifolia Killip
- Passiflora cremastantha Harms
- Passiflora crenata Feuillet & Cremera
- Passiflora crispolanata L. Uribe
- Passiflora cryptopetala Hoehne
- Passiflora cuatrecasasii Killip
- Passiflora cubensis Urb.
- ‡ Passiflora cumbalensis (H.Karst.) Harms
- Passiflora cuneata Willd.
- ¤ Passiflora cupiformis Mast.
- Passiflora cupraea L.
- Passiflora cuspidifolia Harms
- Passiflora cuzcoensis Killip
- Passiflora cyanea Mast.

== D ==
- Passiflora dalechampioides Killip
- Passiflora dasyadenia Urb.
- Passiflora dawei Killip
- Passiflora deficiens Mast.
- Passiflora deidamioides Harms
- Passiflora deltoifolia Holm-Niels. & J.E.Lawesson
- Passiflora dictamo DC.
- Passiflora dioscoreifolia Killip
- Passiflora discophora P.Jørg. & J.E.Lawesson
- Passiflora dispar Killip
- Passiflora dolichocarpa Killip

== E ==
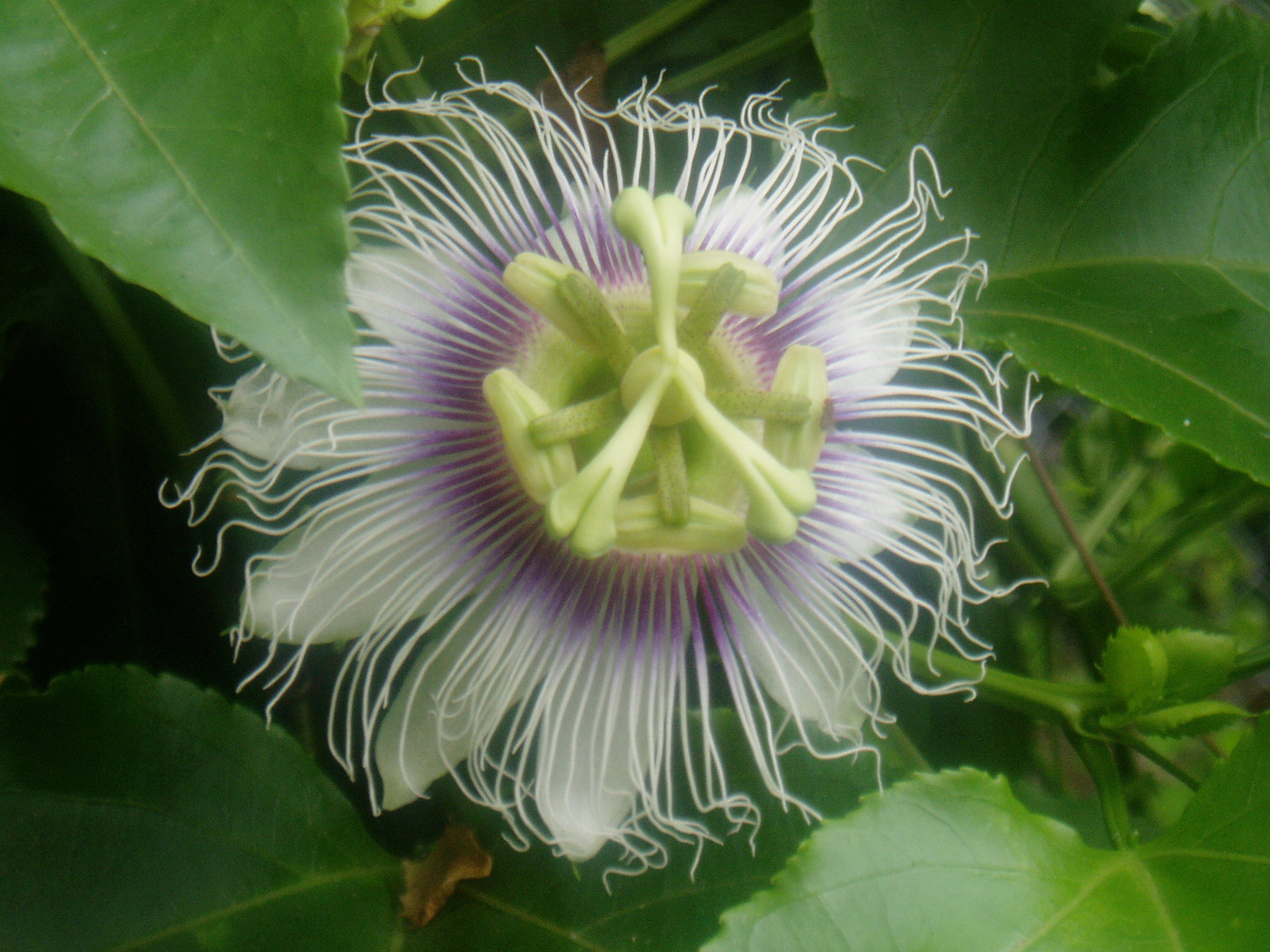
- Passionfruit (Passiflora edulis)
  ¤ Passiflora eberhardtii Gagnep.
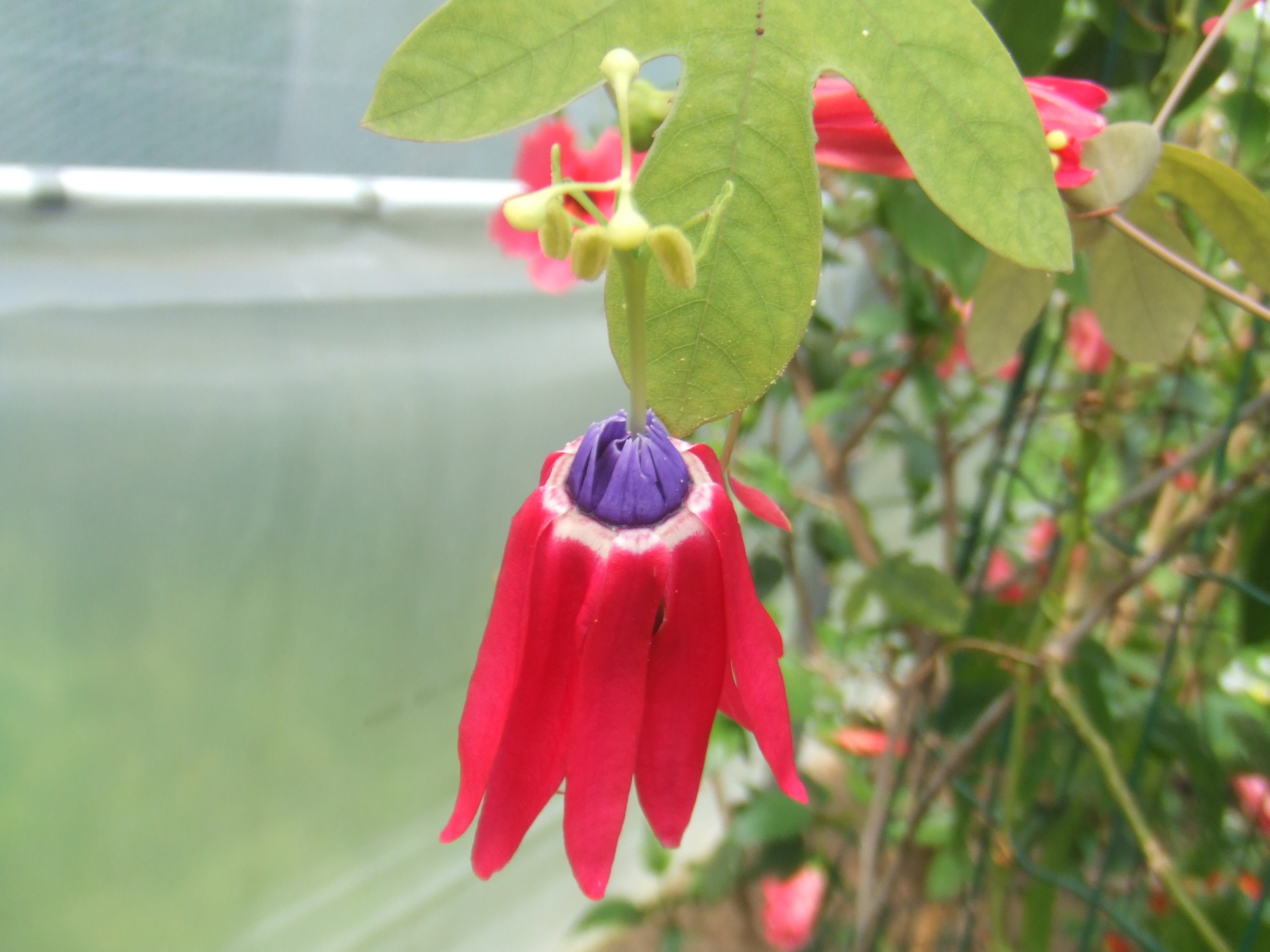
- Passiflora edmundoi
  Passiflora edmundoi Sacco
- † Passiflora edulis Sims – passion fruit, maracujá, parcha (Puerto Rico), wal dodam (Sinhalese), yellow granadilla, likkoi, marucuyá
- Passiflora eggersii Harms
- Passiflora eglandulosa J.M.MacDougal
- Passiflora eichleriana Mast.
- Passiflora ekmanii Killip & Urb.
- Passiflora elegans Mast.
- Passiflora elliptica Gardner
- Passiflora emarginata Bonpl.
- Passiflora engleriana Harms
- Passiflora ernestii Harms
- Passiflora erythrophylla Mast.
- Passiflora escobariana J.M.MacDougal
- Passiflora eueidipabulum S. Knapp & Mallet
- Passiflora exoperculata Mast.
- Passiflora exsudans Zucc.
- Passiflor exura Feuillet

== F ==
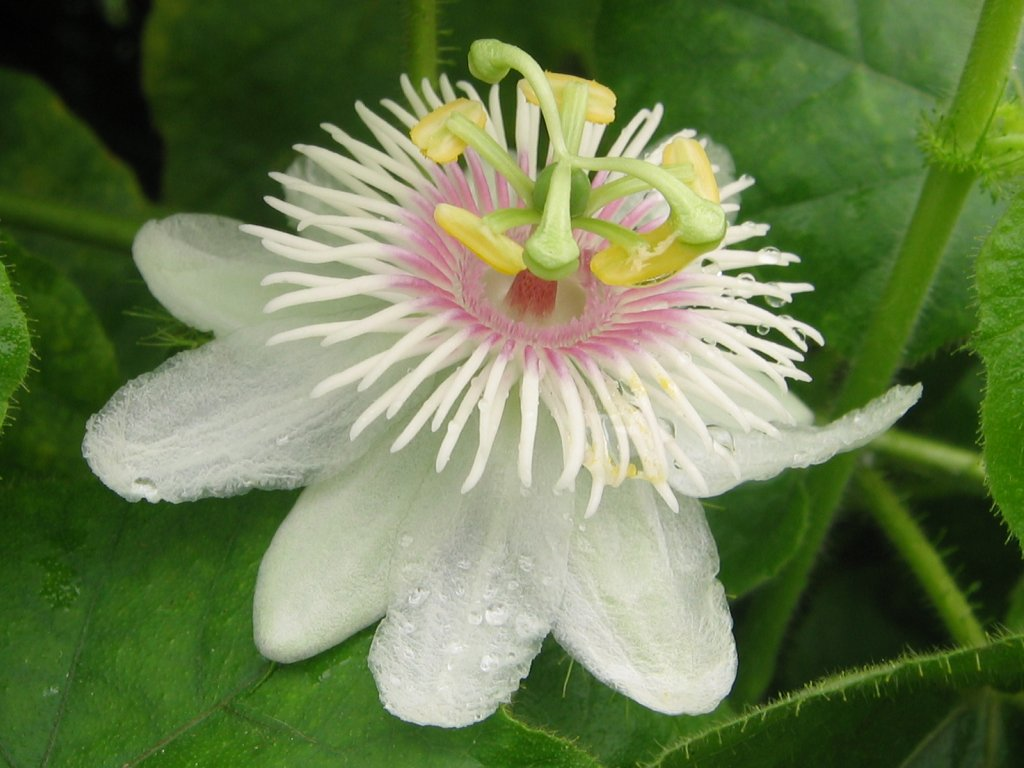
- Wild water lemon Passiflora foetida
  Passiflora fanchonae Feuillet
- Passiflora farneyi Pessoa & Cervi
- Passiflora faroana Harms
- Passiflora fernandezii L.K. Escobar
- Passiflora ferruginea Mast.
- Passiflora filamentosa Cav.
- Passiflora filipes Benth
- Passiflora fimbriatistipula Harma
- Passiflora flexipes Triana and Planch.
- ‡ Passiflora foetida L. – stinking passion flower, foetid passion flower, wild maracujá, running pop
- Passiflora frutescens Ruiz & Pav. ex Killip
- Passiflora fruticosa Killip
- Passiflora fuchsiiflora Hemsl.

== G ==
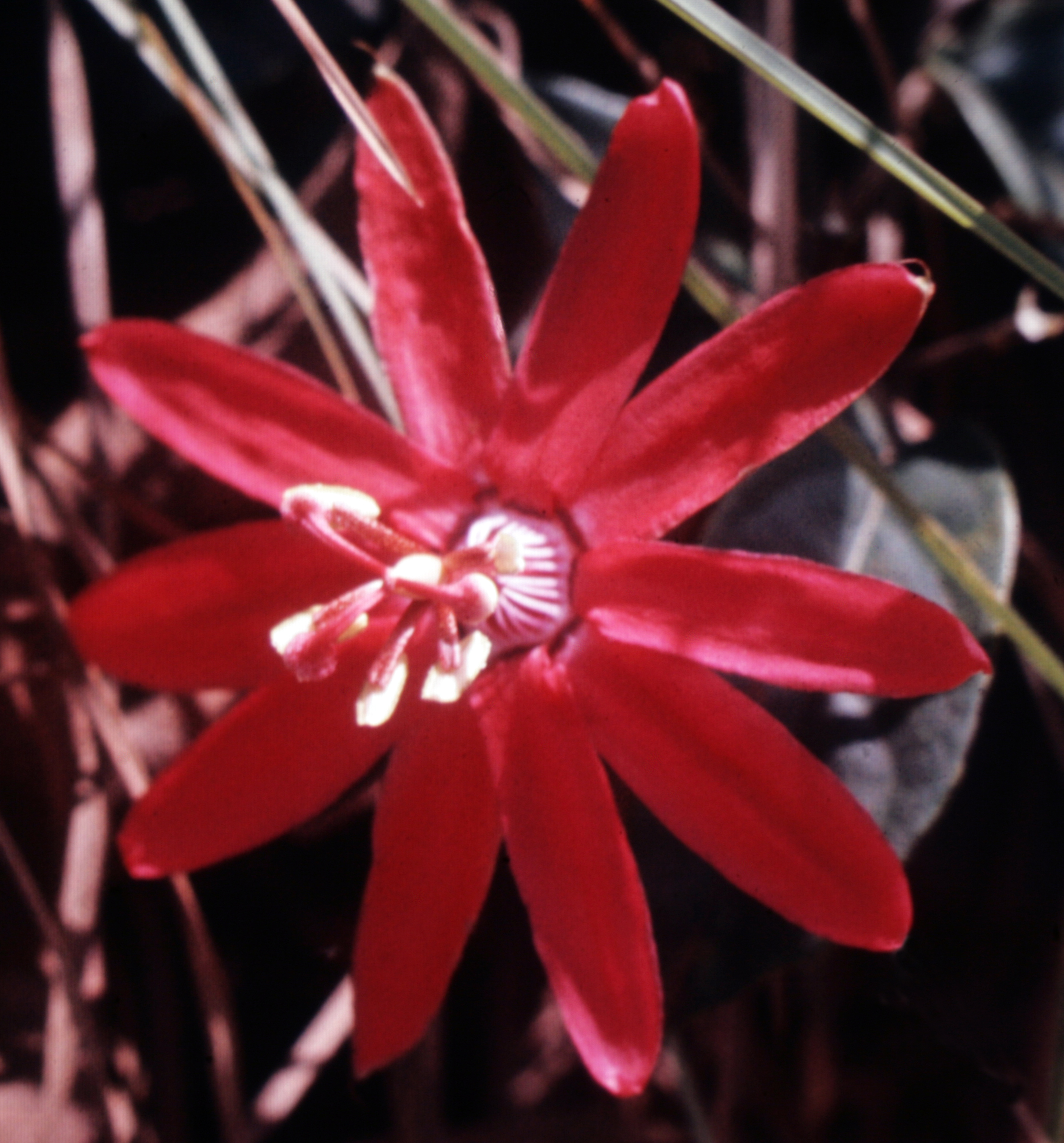
Passiflora glandulosa

- Passiflora galbana Masters
- Passiflora gardneri Masters
- Passiflora gibertii N. E. Br.
- Passiflora glandulosa Cav.
- Passiflora goniosperma Killip
- Passiflora gracillima Killip
- Passiflora guatemalensis S. Wats.

== H ==
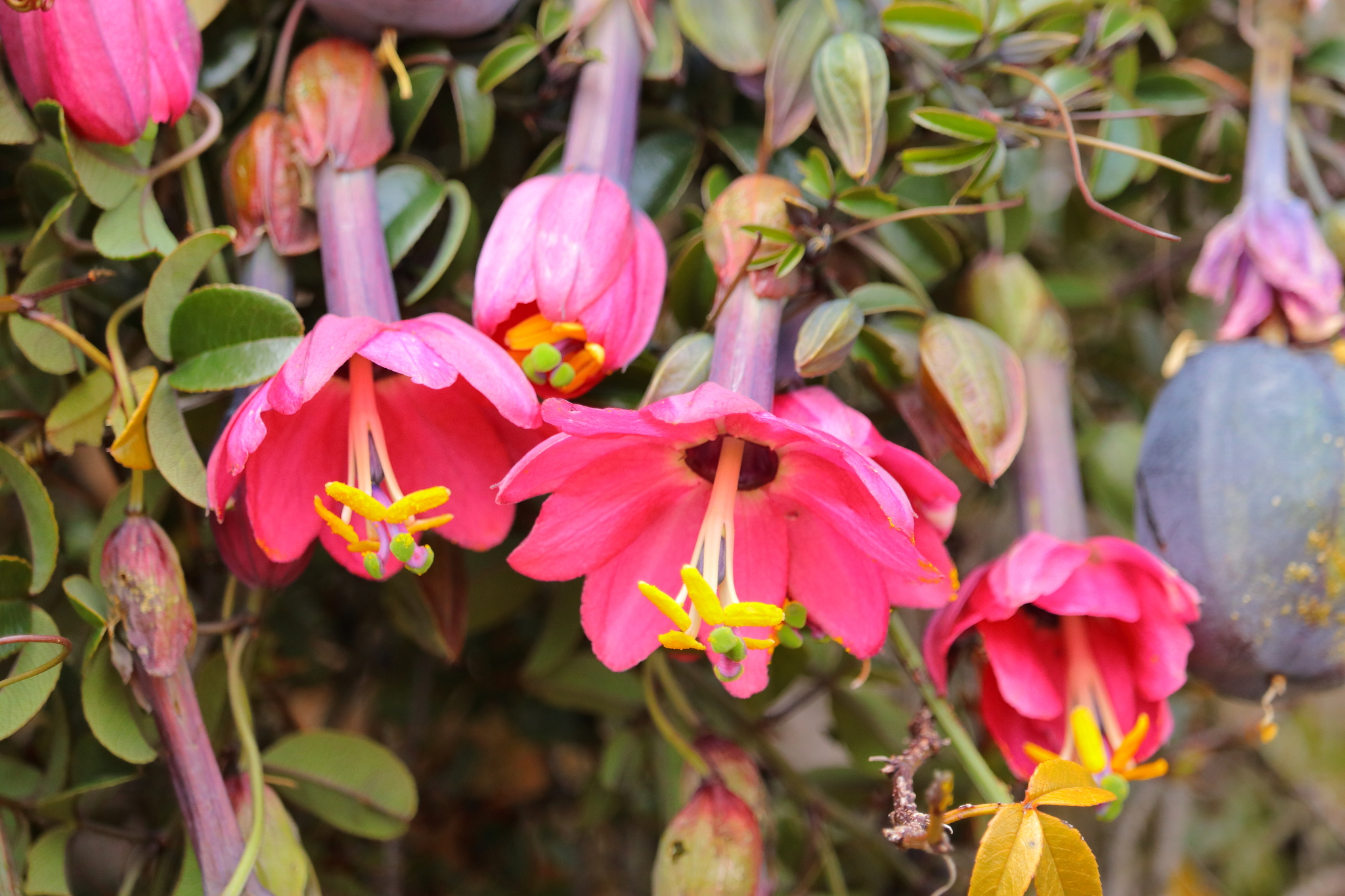
- Passiflora huamachucoensis
  Passiflora haematostigma Mast.
- Passiflora hahnii Mast.
- Passiflora harlingii Holm-Niels.
- ¤ Passiflora henryii Hemsl.
- ‡¤ Passiflora herbertiana Ker Gawl. – native passionfruit
- Passiflora hirtiflora P.Jørg. & Holm-Niels.
- ¤ Passiflora hollrungii K.Schum.
- Passiflora holosericea L.
- Passiflora hyacinthiflora Planch. & Linden

== I ==
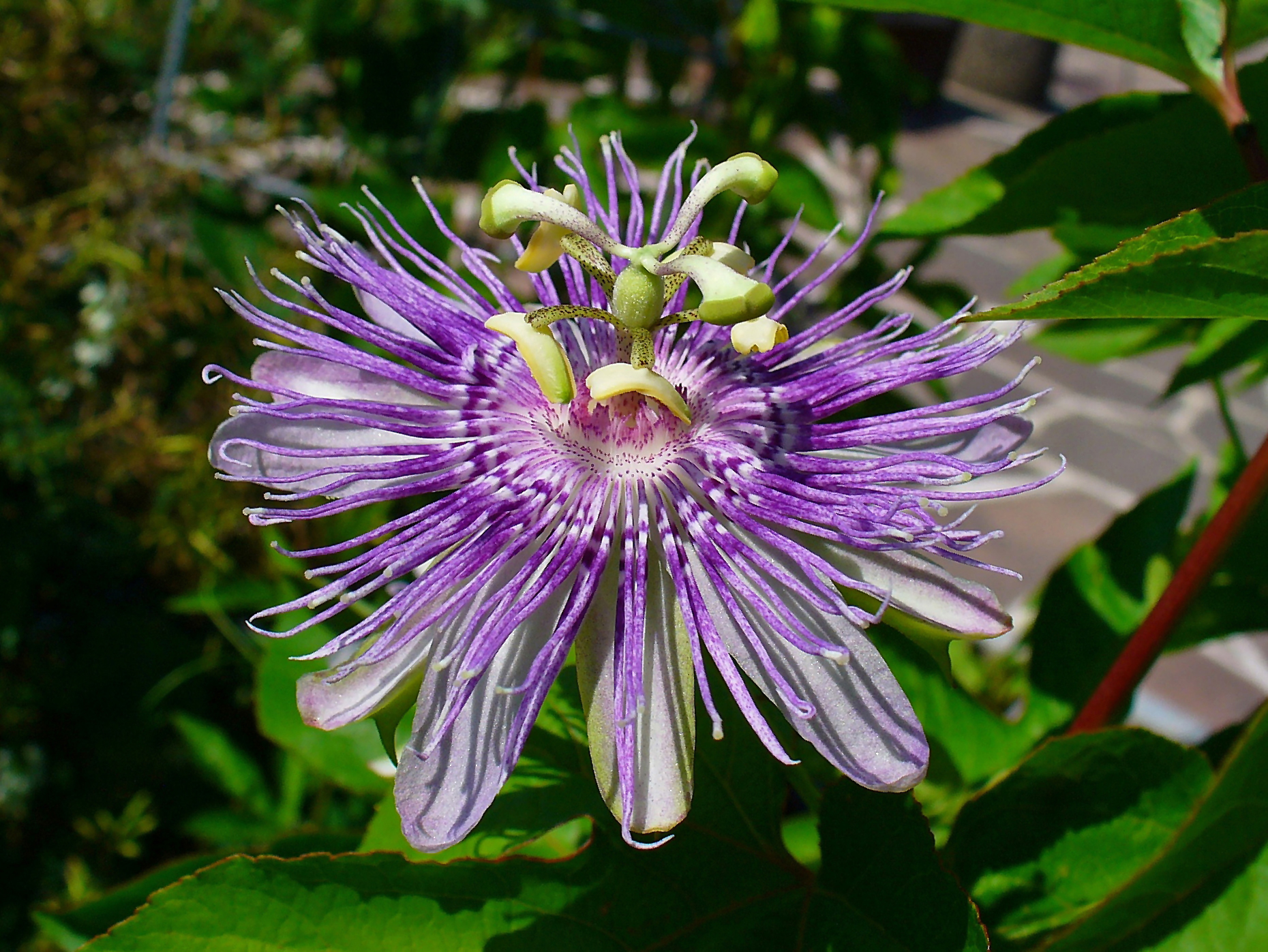
Passiflora incarnata

- ‡ Passiflora incarnata L. – maypop, purple passion flower, ocoee (Cherokee)
- Passiflora indecora Kunth
- Passiflora insignis Hook.
- Passiflora ita Mezzonato, R. S. Ribeiro & Gonella
- Passiflora involucrata (Mast.) A.H.Gentry

== J ==
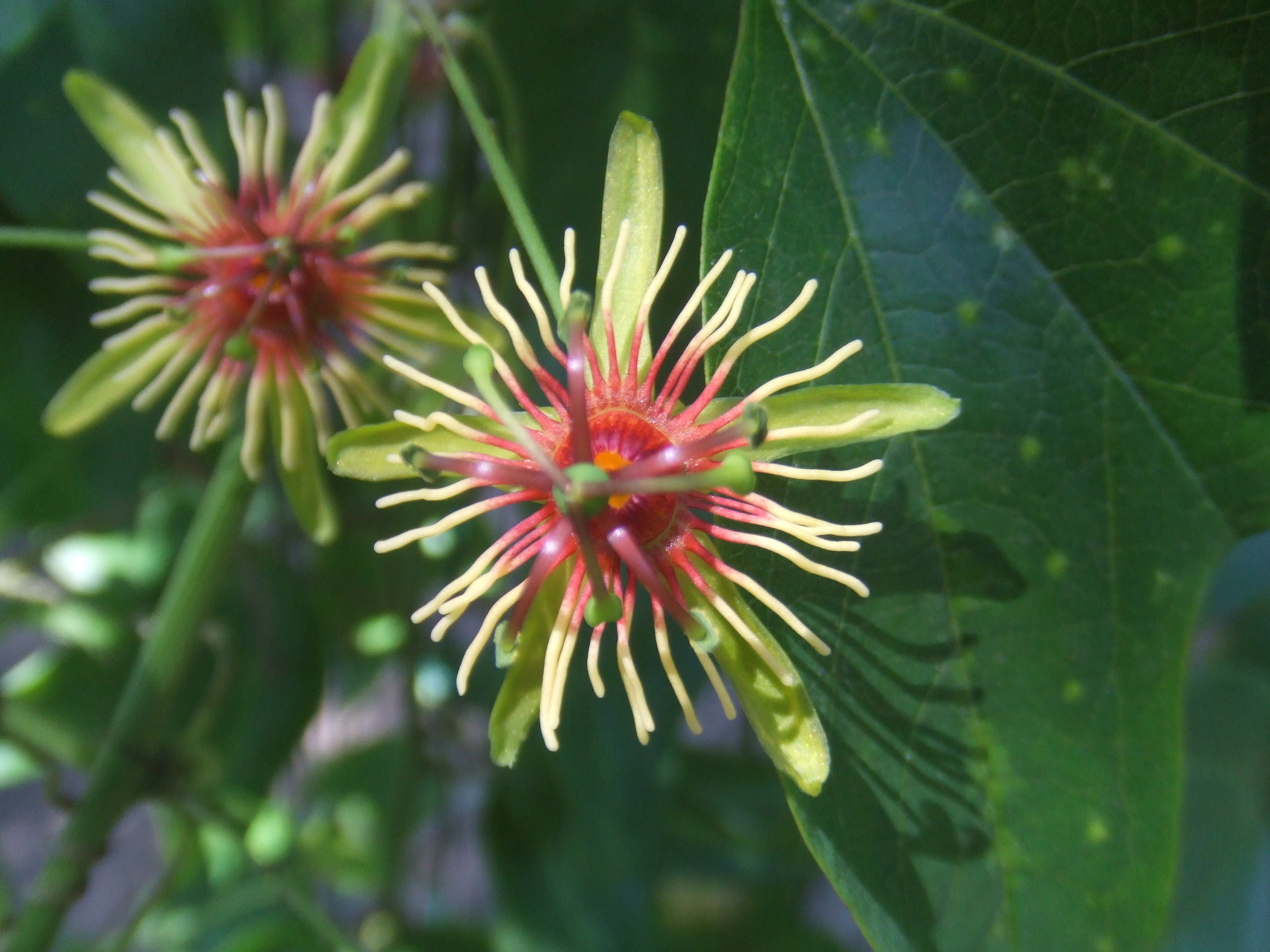
- Passiflora jorullensis
  Passiflora jamesonii L.H.Bailey
- Passiflora jatunsachensis M.Schwerdtfeger
- ¤ Passiflora jiangfengensis S.M.Hwang and Q.Huang
- Passiflora jorgeana Mezzonato
- Passiflora jorullensis Kunth.
- ¤ Passiflora jugorum W.W.Sm.
- Passiflora juliana

== K ==
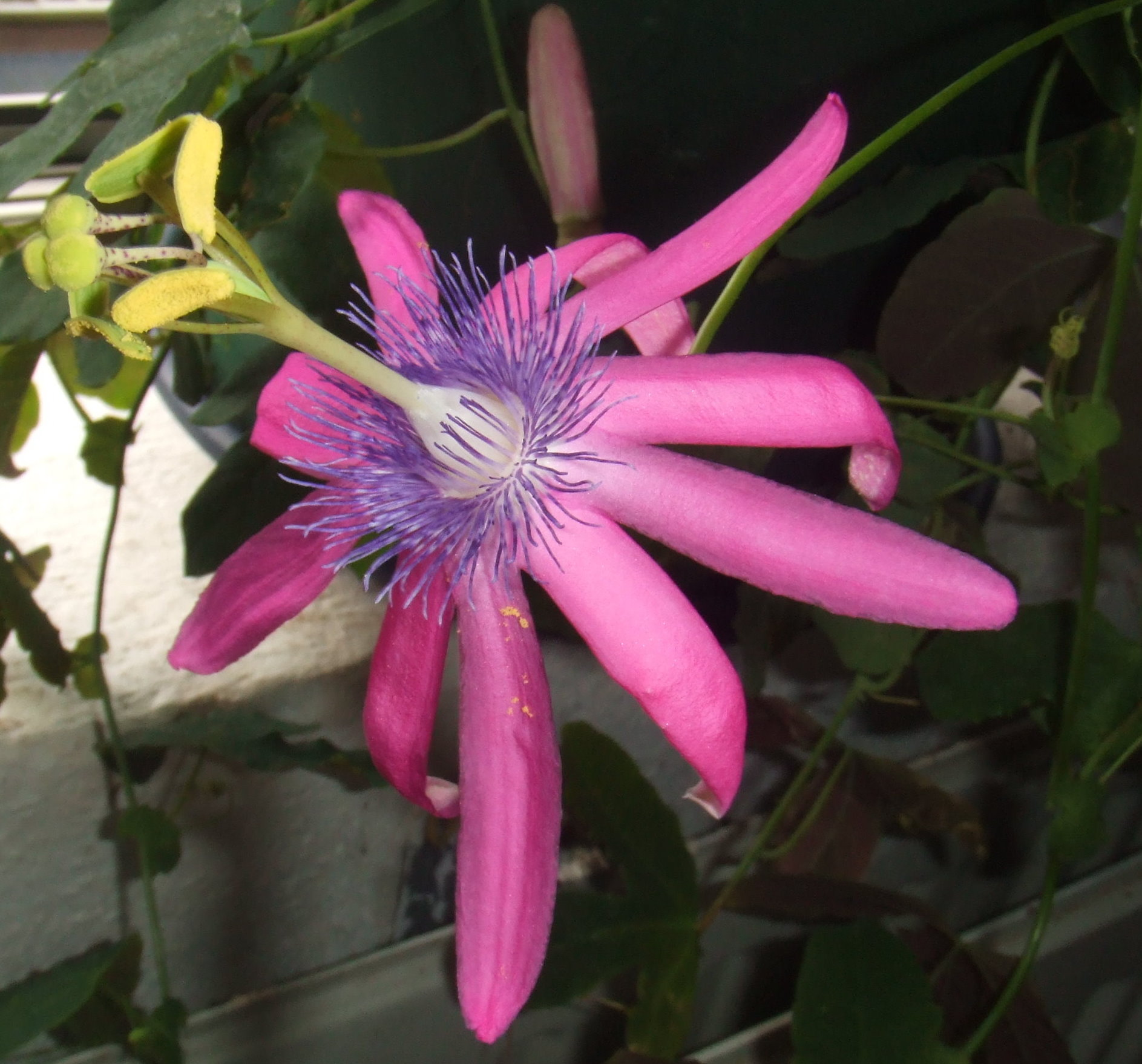
Passiflora kermesina

- Passiflora kermesina Link & Otto
- ¤ Passiflora kuranda Krosnick
- ¤ Passiflora kwangtungensis Merr.

== L ==
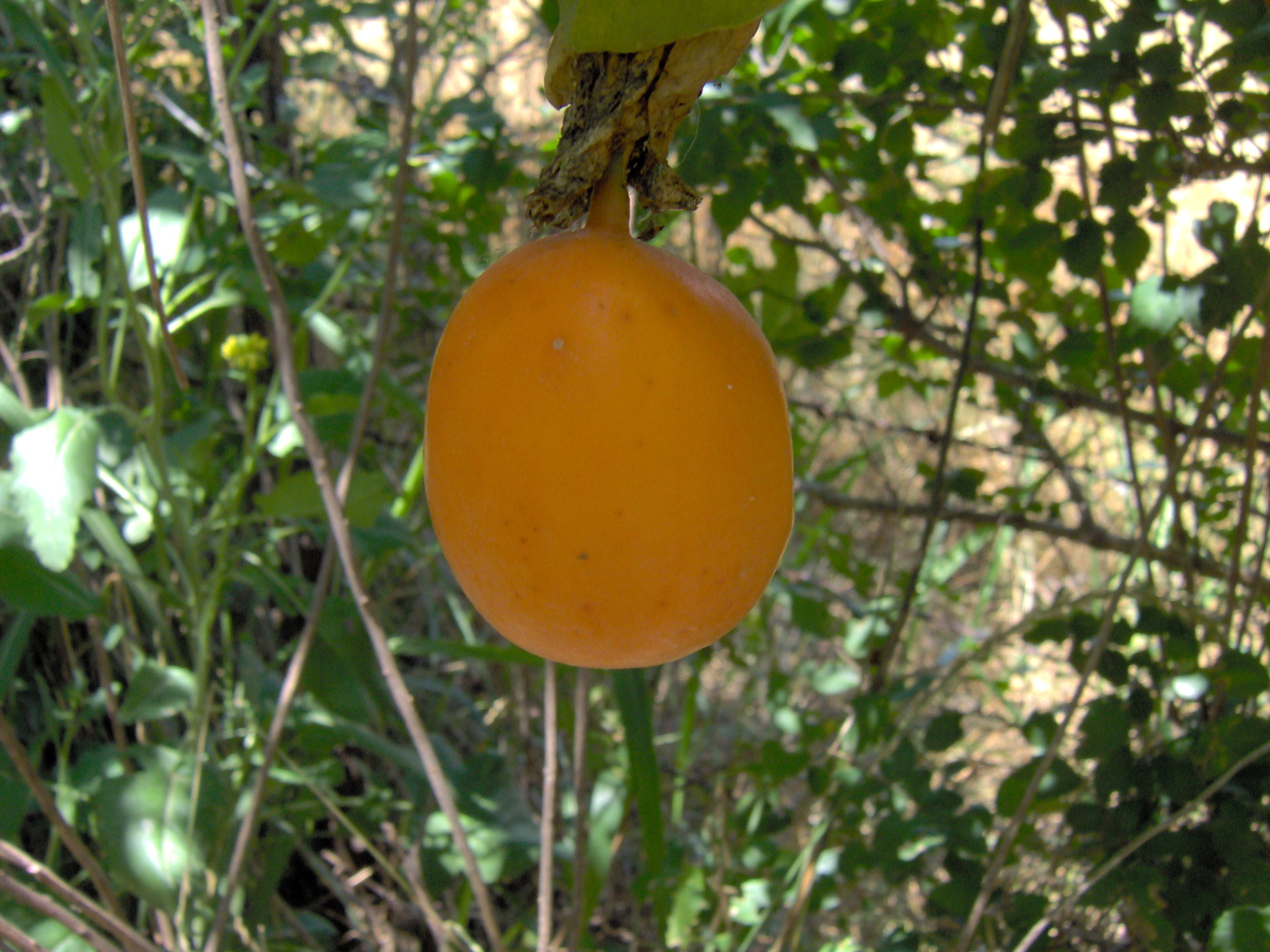
- Sweet granadilla (Passiflora ligularis)
  Passiflora lanata Poir.
- Passiflora lancifolia
- Passiflora lauana J.M.MacDougal
- † Passiflora laurifolia L. – water lemon, Jamaican honeysuckle
- ¤ Passiflora leschenaultii DC.
- † Passiflora ligularis A.Juss. – sweet granadilla
- Passiflora linda Panero
- Passiflora lindeniana Planch. ex Triana & Planch.
- Passiflora loefgrenii Vitta
- Passiflora lorenziana Mezzonato & Bernacci
- Passiflora loxensis Killip & Cuatrec.
- Passiflora lutea L. – yellow passion flower
- Passiflora luzmarina P.Jørg.
- Passiflora lyra Planch. & Linden ex Killip

== M ==
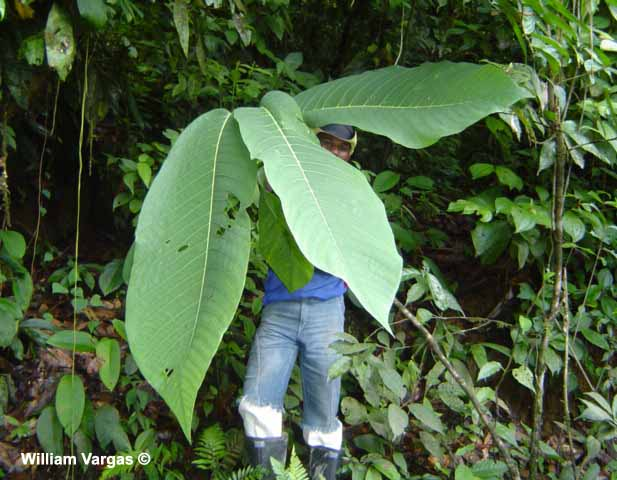
Passiflora macrophylla

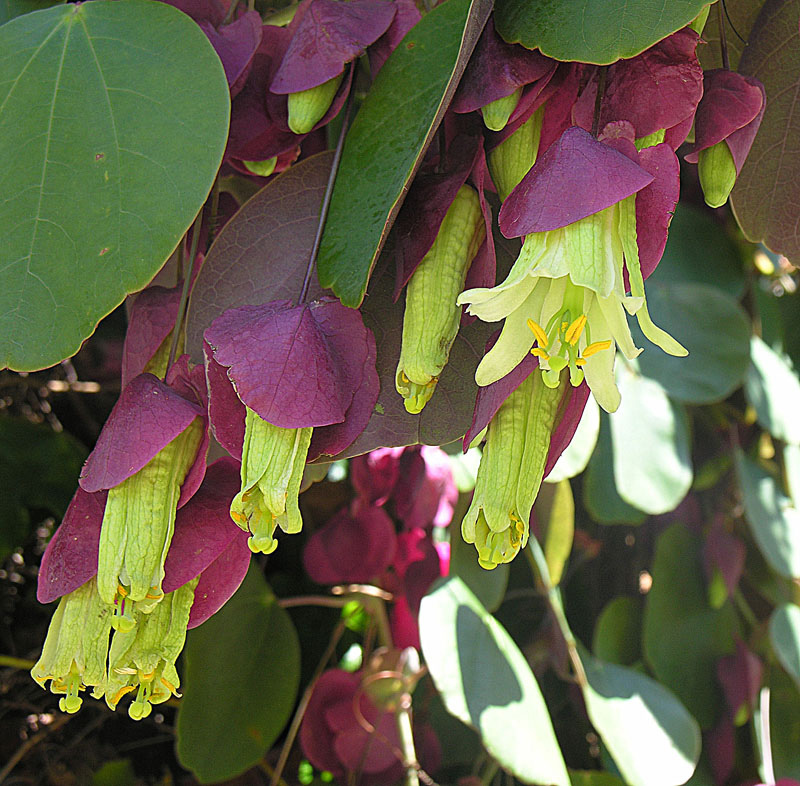
- Passiflora membranacea
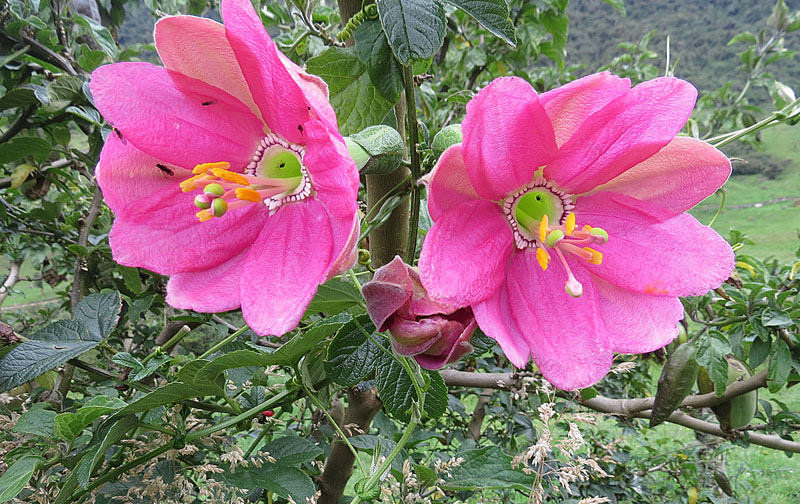
  Passiflora mixta
  Passiflora macdougaliana S.Knapp & J.Mallet
- Passiflora macfadyenii
- Passiflora macrophylla Spruce ex Mast. – tree passion flower
- Passiflora macvaughiana
- † Passiflora maliformis L. – sweet calabash
- Passiflora manicata (Juss.) Pers.
- Passiflora membranacea Benth.
- Passiflora menispermifolia Kunth
- Passiflora microstipula L.E.Gilbert & J.M.MacDougal
- Passiflora miersii Mast.
- Passiflora miniata Vanderpl.
- Passiflora misera Kunth
- ‡ Passiflora mixta L.f.
- ¤ Passiflora moluccana Reinw. ex Blume
- Passiflora monadelpha P.Jørg. & Holm-Niels.
- Passiflora montana
- Passiflora morifolia Mast. – blue sweet calabash, woodland passion flower
- Passiflora mucronata Lam.
- Passiflora multiflora L.– whiteflower passionflower
- Passiflora murucuja L.

== N ==
- ¤ Passiflora napalensis Wall.
- ‡ Passiflora nitida Kunth.– bell apple

== O ==
- Passiflora obtusifolia
- Passiflora odontophylla Harms ex Glaz.
- Passiflora oerstedii Mast.
- Passiflora organensis Gardner
- Passiflora ovalis Vell.

== P ==
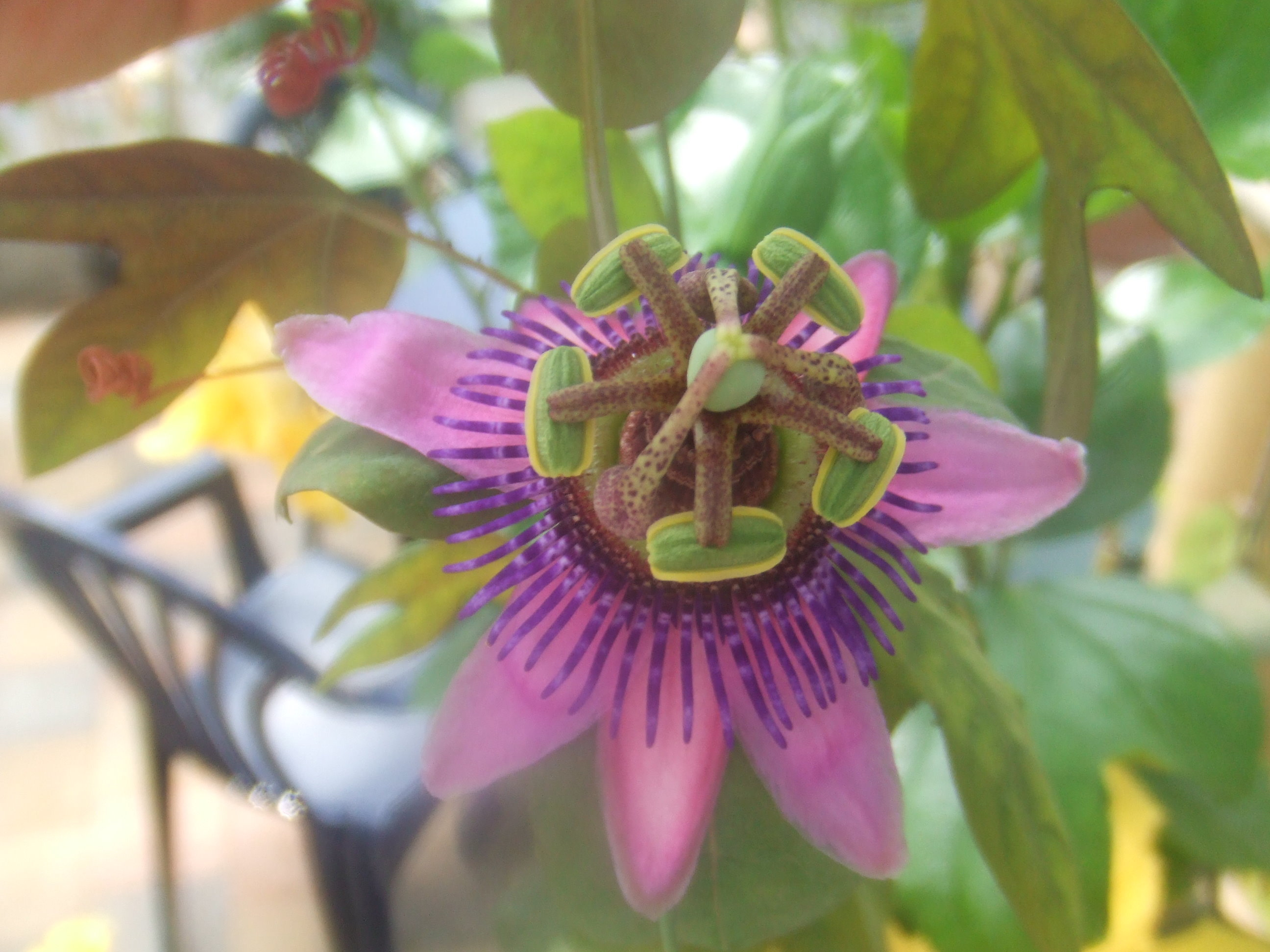
Passiflora picturata

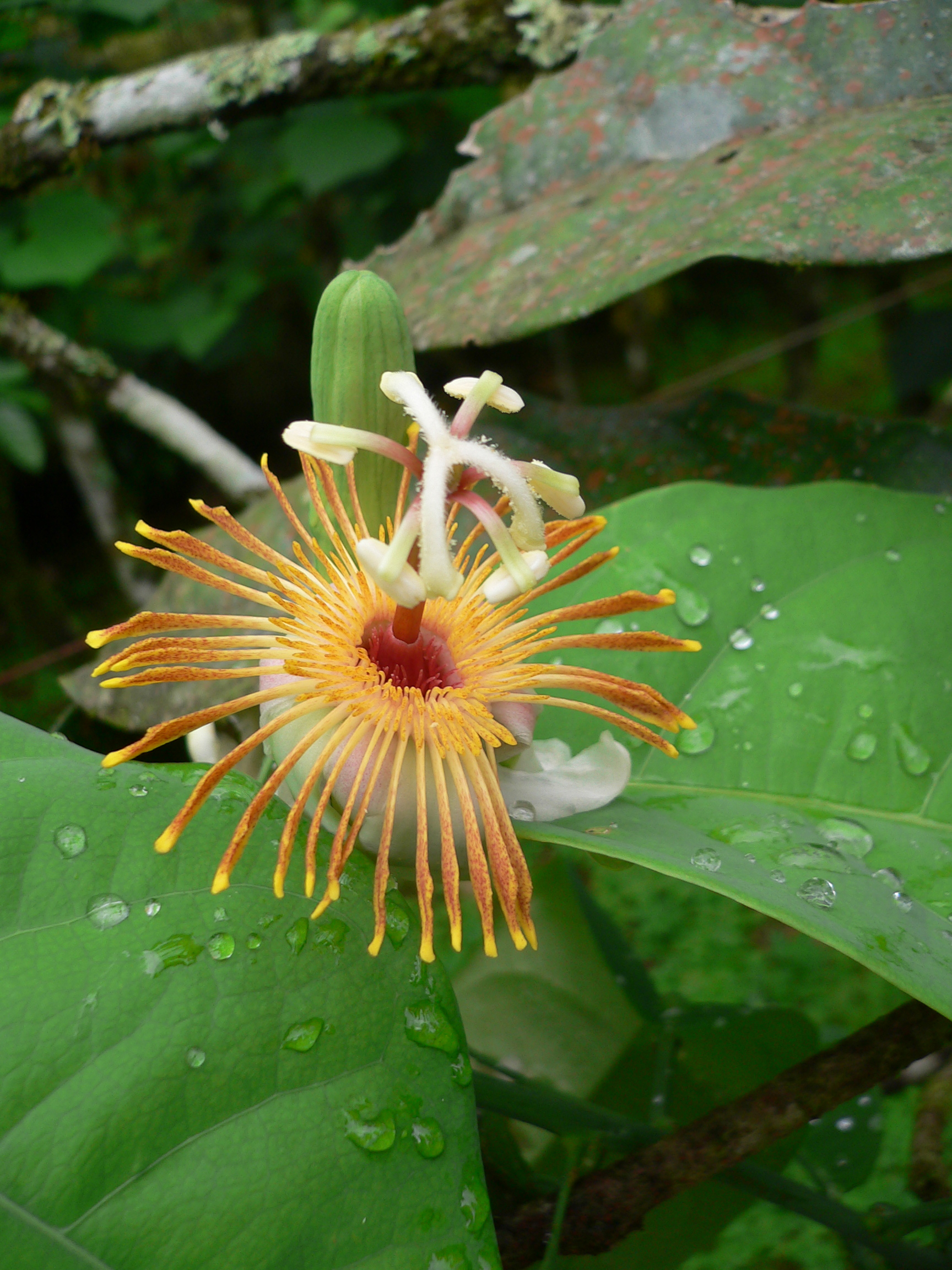
Passiflora pittieri

- Passiflora pala Planch. & Linden
- Passiflora palenquensis Holm-Nielsen & Lawesson
- Passiflora pallens Poepp. ex Masters– pineland passionflower
- Passiflora pallida
- Passiflora pamplonensis Planch. & Linden
- ¤ Passiflora papilio H.L.Li
- Passiflora pardifolia Vanderpl.
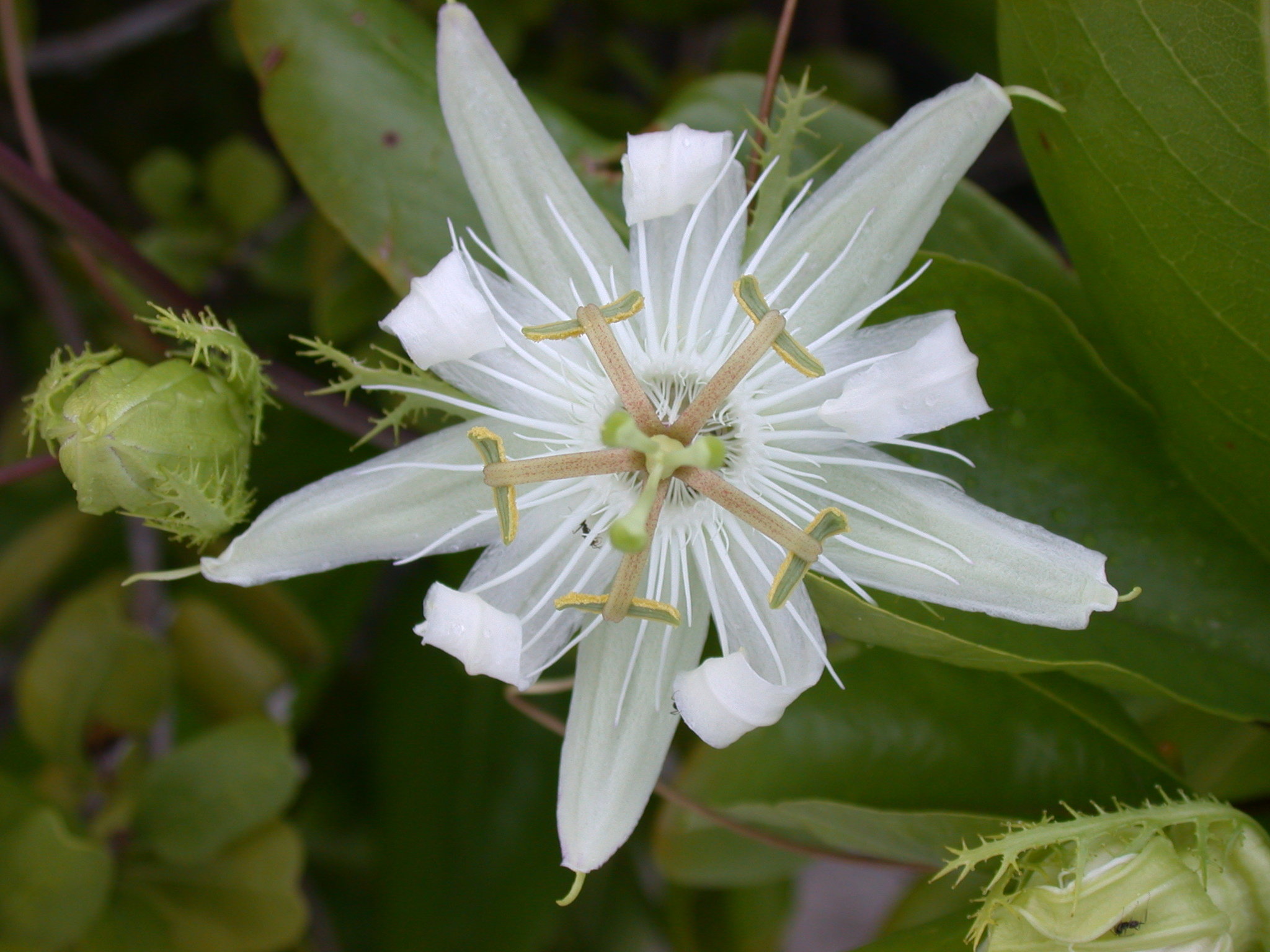
- Passiflora pectinata
  Passiflora pectinata Griseb.
- Passiflora penduliflora Bert. ex DC.
- Passiflora pentagona Mast.
- ¤ Passiflora perakensis Hallier f.
- ‡ Passiflora pergrandis Holm-Nielsen & Lawesson
- Passiflora picturata Ker Gawl.
- Passiflora pilosa Ruiz & Pavon ex DC.
- Passiflora pinnatistipula Cav.
- Passiflora pittieri Mast.
- Passiflora platyloba Killip
- Passiflora poeppigii Mast.
- Passiflora pohlii Mast.
- Passiflora popenovii Killip
- Passiflora porphyretica Mast.
- Passiflora prolata Mast.
- Passiflora punctata L.
- Passiflora purii Mezzonato, Lima & A.P.Gelli
- Passiflora pusilla J.M.MacDougal
- Passiflora pyrrhantha Harms

== Q ==
- Passiflora quadrangularis L. – giant granadilla, giant tumbo, badea
- Passiflora quetzal J.M.MacDougal

== R ==
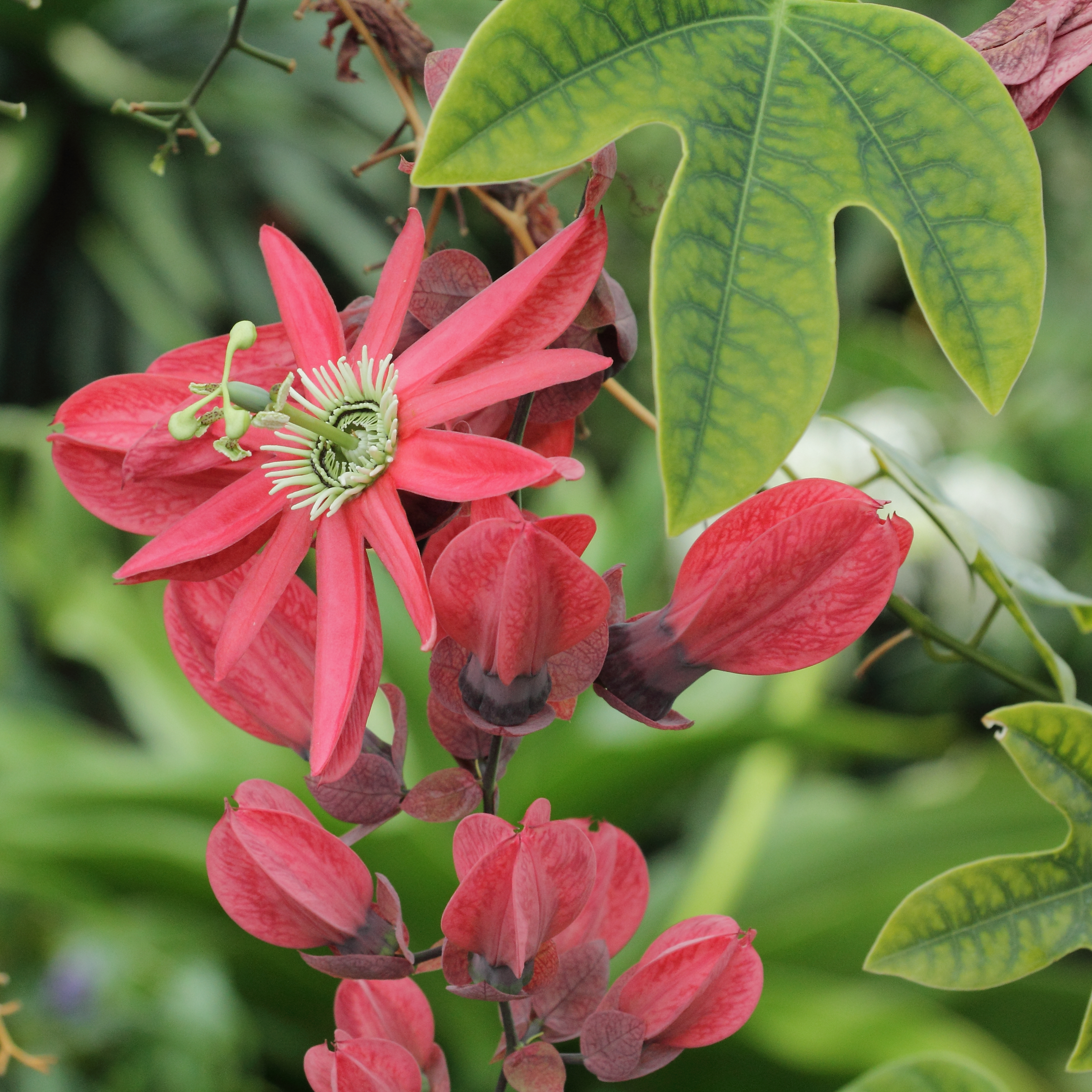
Passiflora racemosa

- Passiflora racemosa Brot.
- Passiflora recurva Mast.
- Passiflora reflexiflora Cav.
- Passiflora resticulata Mast. & André
- Passiflora retipetala Mast.
- Passiflora rhamnifolia Mast.
- Passiflora riparia Mart. ex Mast.
- Passiflora roseorum Killip
- Passiflora rubra L.
- Passiflora rugosa (Mast.) Planch. & Triana
- Passiflora rupestris Bernacci, Mezzonato & Salimena
- Passiflora rusbyi Mast.

== S ==
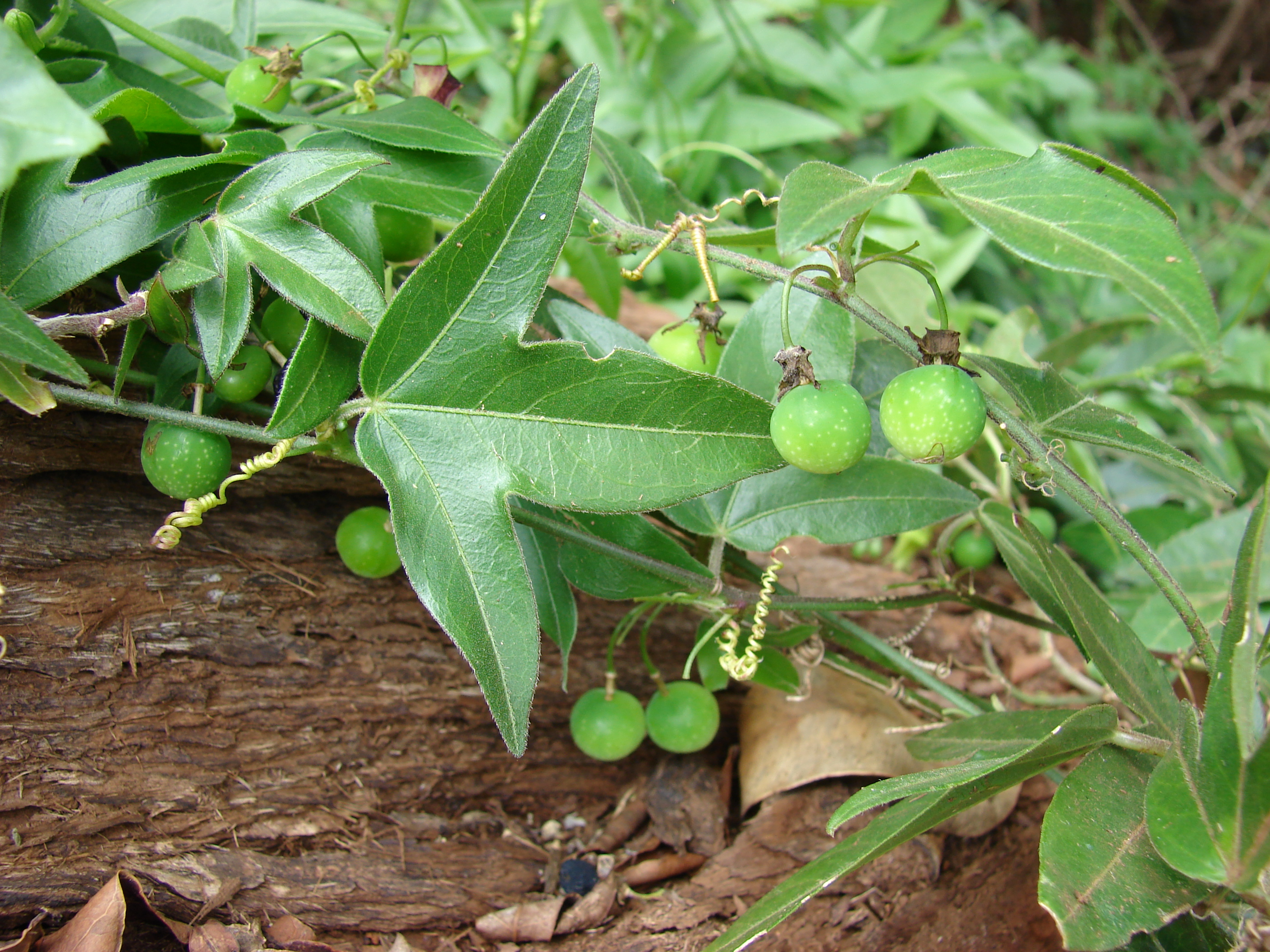
- Passiflora suberosa
  Passiflora sanctae-barbarae Holm-Nielsen & Jørgensen
- Passiflora sanguinolenta Mast. & Linden
- ‡ Passiflora schlimiana Triana & Planch.
- Passiflora securiclata Mast.
- ‡ Passiflora seemannii Griseb.
- Passiflora sexocellata
- Passiflora sexflora Juss. – goatsfoot
- Passiflora serratifolia L.
- ‡ Passiflora serratodigitata L.
- Passiflora setacea DC.
- ¤ Passiflora siamica Craib
- Passiflora sicyoides Schlecht. & Cham.
- Passiflora smilacifolia J.M.MacDougal
- Passiflora sodiroi Harms
- Passiflora speciosa Gardner
- Passiflora spicata Mast.
- Passiflora spinosa (Poepp. & Endl.) Mast.
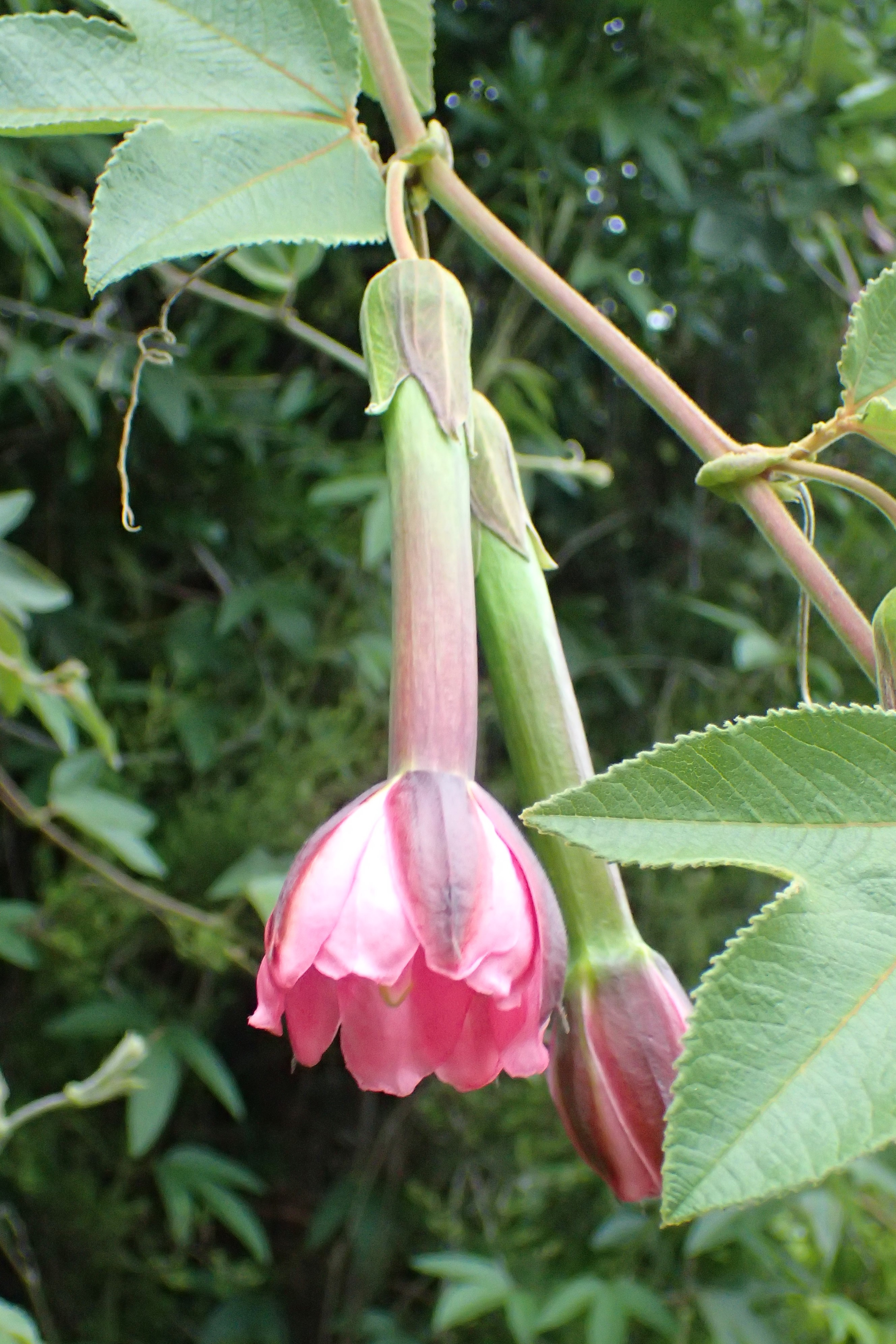
- Passiflora tripartita
  Passiflora sprucei Mast.
- Passiflora suberosa L. – corky-stemmed passion flower
- Passiflora sublanceolata (Killip) J.M.MacDougal
- Passiflora subpeltata Ortega – white passion flower
- Passiflora subpurpurea Jørgensen & Holm-Nielsen
- Passiflora subrotunda Mast.
- Passiflora subulata Mast.
- ¤ Passiflora sumatrana Blume

== T ==
- † Passiflora tarminiana Coppens & V.Barney – banana passion flower, curuba India, curuba ecuatoriana, banana pōka (Hawaiʻi), curuba quiteña (Colombia), tacso amarillo (Ecuador)
- Passiflora telesiphe Knapp & Mallet
- ¤ Passiflora tetrandra Banks & Sol. ex DC
- Passiflora tenuifila Killip
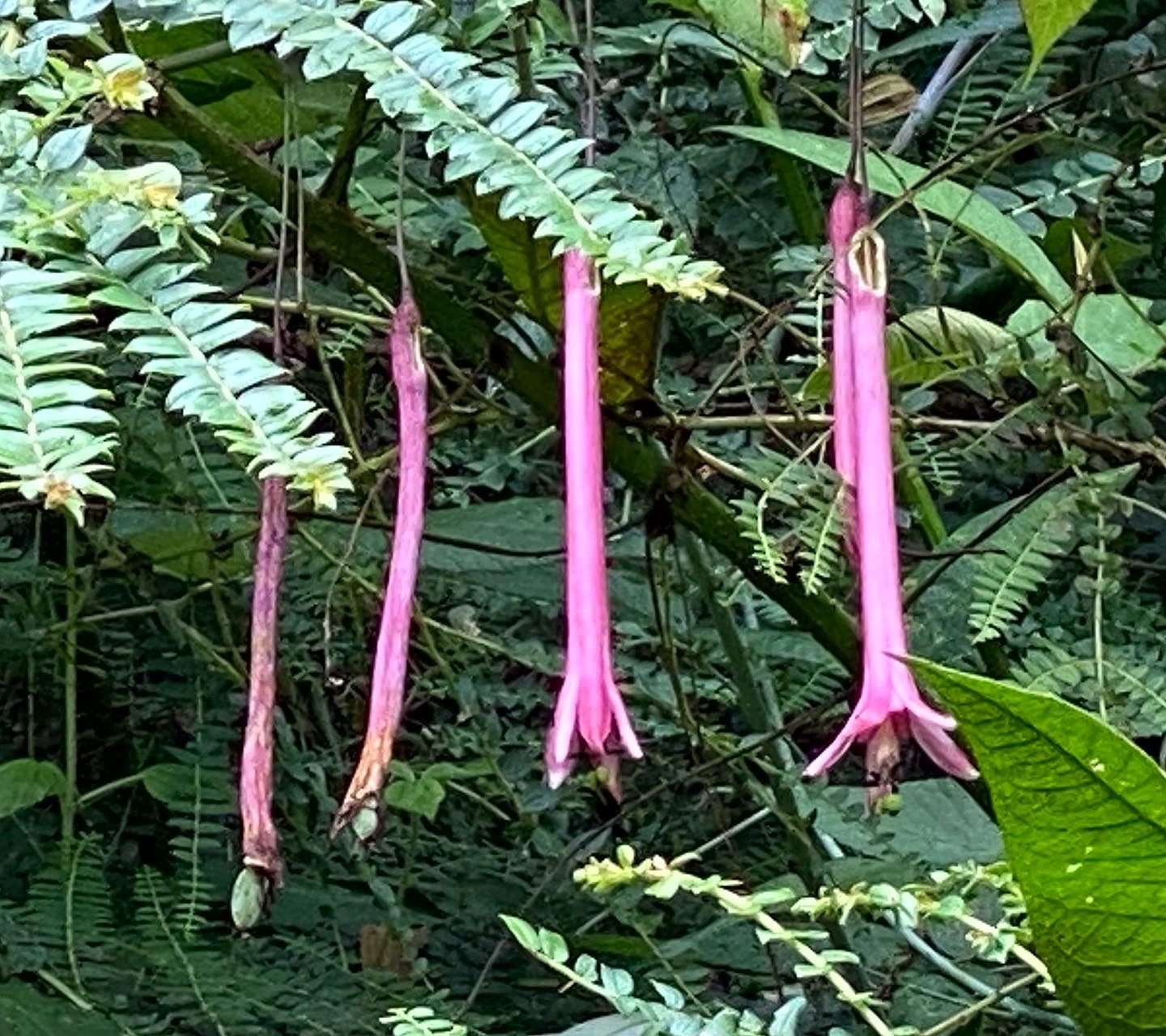
  Passiflora trinervia
- Passiflora tenuiloba
- Passiflora tica Gómez-Laurito & L.D.Gómez
- ¤ Passiflora tonkinensis W.J.de Wilde
- Passiflora transversa Mast.
- Passiflora trialata Feuillet & J.M.MacDougal
- Passiflora tricuspis Mast.
- Passiflora tridactylites
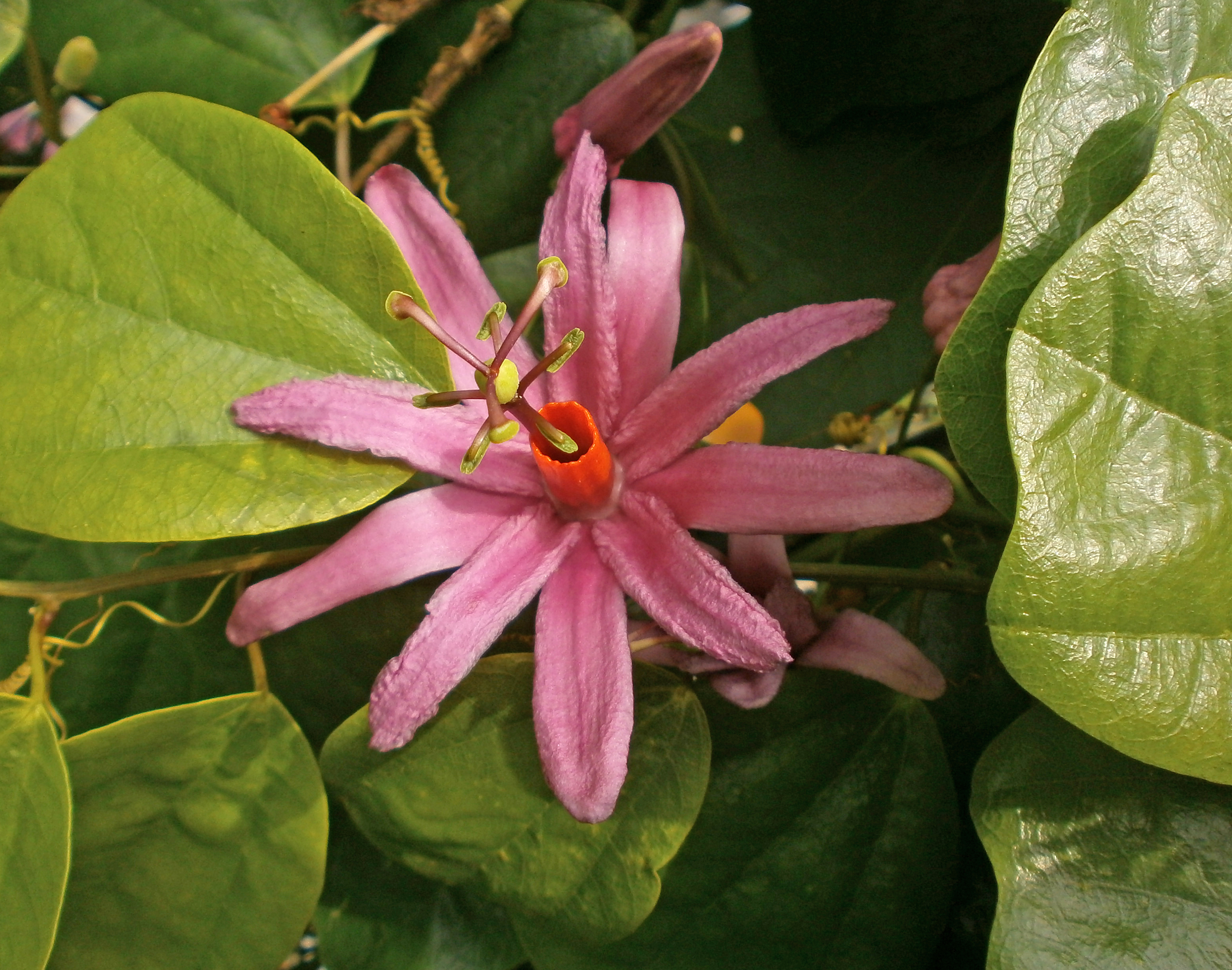
  Passiflora tulae
- Passiflora trifasciata Lem.
- Passiflora trinervia (Juss.) Poir
- Passiflora trinifolia Mast.
- Passiflora tripartita (Juss.) Poir
  - † Passiflora tripartita var. mollissima
- Passiflora trisecta Mast.
- Passiflora trisulca Mast.
- Passiflora trochlearis Jørgensen
- Passiflora tulae Urb.

== U ==
- Passiflora ulmeri Schwerdtfeger
- Passiflora umbilicata (Griseb.) Harms
- Passiflora urbaniana Killip

== V ==
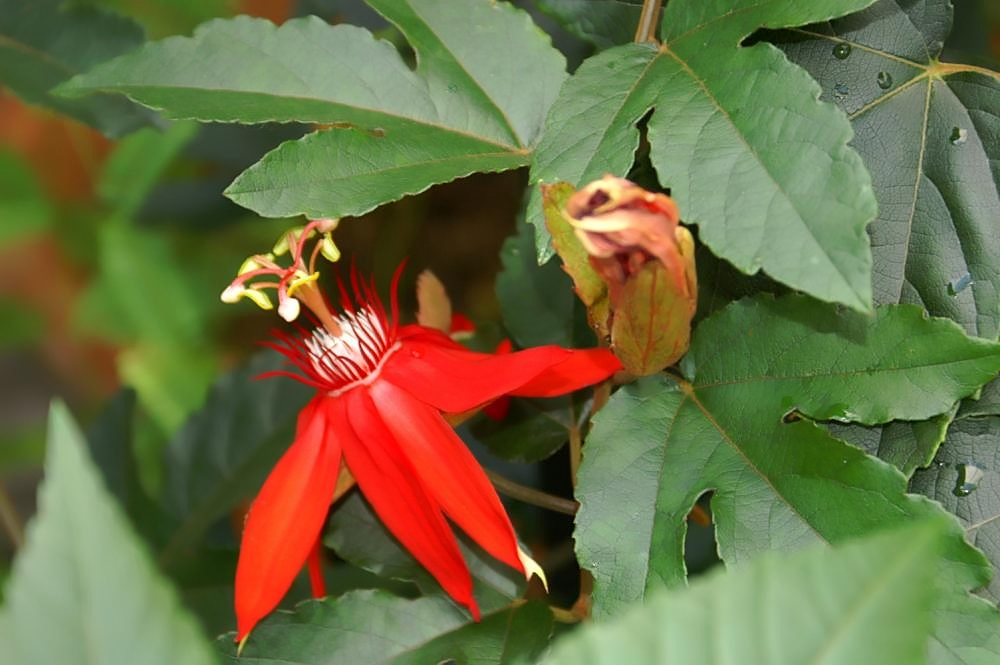
Passiflora vitifolia

- Passiflora vellozii Gardner
- Passiflora vesicaria L.
- Passiflora viridescens L.K. Escobar
- Passiflora viridiflora
- † Passiflora vitifolia Kunth

== W ==
- Passiflora watsoniana Mast.
- Passiflora weberbaueri Harms
- Passiflora weigendii Ulmer & Schwerdtf.
- Passiflora wilsonii Hemsl.

== X ==
- Passiflora xiikzodz
- ¤ Passiflora xishuangbannaensis Krosnick

== Y ==
- Passiflora yucatanensis Killip

== Z ==
- Passiflora zamorana Killip

== Horticultural hybrids ==
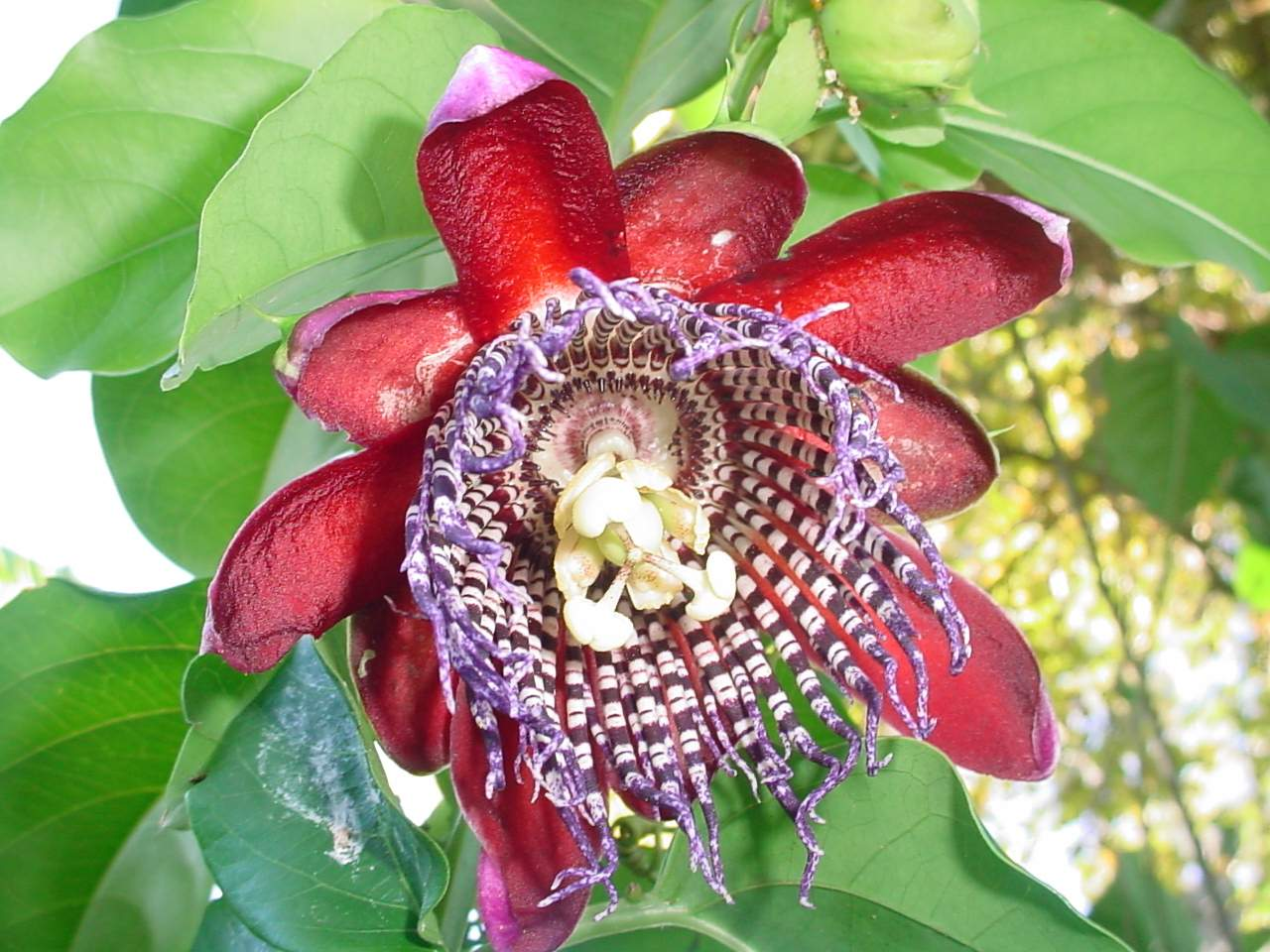
Passiflora × decaisneana

- Passiflora × allardii Lynch (P. caerulea × quadrangularis)
- Passiflora × belotii Pépin (P. alata × caerulea)
- Passiflora × colvillii Sweet (P. incarnata × caerulea)
- Passiflora × decaisneana G.Nicholson (P. alata × quadrangularis)
- Passiflora × exoniensis Mast. (P. antioquiensis × tripartita var. mollissima)
- Passiflora × kewensis Nicholson (P. caerulea × kermesina)
- Passiflora × lawsoniana Mast. (P. alata × racemosa)
- Passiflora × loudonii Loudon (P. racemosa × kermesina)
- Passiflora × smythiana Mast. (P. manicata × tripartita var. mollissima)
- Passiflora × violacea Loisel. (P. racemosa × caerulea)

== Footnotes ==
† - principal culinary species fide Ulmer and MacDougall
‡ - other species with edible fruits fide Ulmer and MacDougall
¤ - Old World species fide Krosnick
