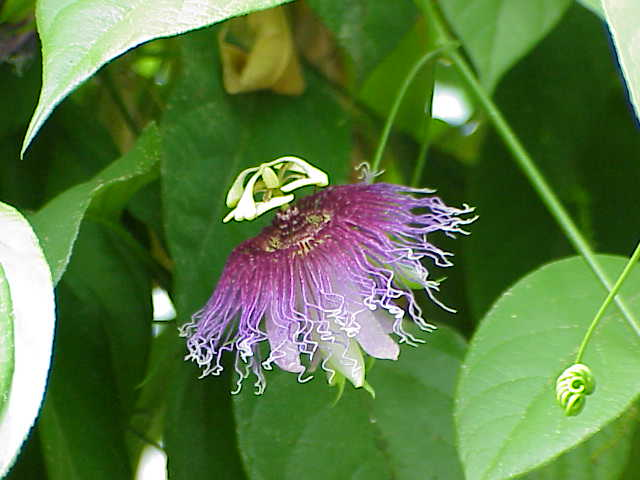

Scientific classification
- Kingdom: Plantae
- Clade: Tracheophytes
- Clade: Angiosperms
- Clade: Eudicots
- Clade: Rosids
- Order: Malpighiales
- Family: Passifloraceae
- Genus: Passiflora
- Species: P. serratifolia

Binomial name
- Passiflora serratifolia Linnaeus, 1753

= Passiflora serratifolia =

Species of vine

Passiflora serratifolia is a species of Passiflora from Suriname.
