= Passiflora indecora =

Conservation status
- Least Concern (IUCN 3.1)

Scientific classification
- Kingdom: Plantae
- Clade: Tracheophytes
- Clade: Angiosperms
- Clade: Eudicots
- Clade: Rosids
- Order: Malpighiales
- Family: Passifloraceae
- Genus: Passiflora
- Species: P. indecora

Binomial name
- Passiflora indecora Kunth

Species of vine

Passiflora indecora is a species of plant in the family Passifloraceae. It is found in Ecuador and possibly Peru.
