= Passiflora serratodigitata =

Scientific classification
- Kingdom: Plantae
- Clade: Embryophytes
- Clade: Tracheophytes
- Clade: Angiosperms
- Clade: Eudicots
- Clade: Rosids
- Order: Malpighiales
- Family: Passifloraceae
- Genus: Passiflora
- Species: P. serratodigitata

Binomial name
- Passiflora serratodigitata Linnaeus

Synonyms
- Passiflora serrata L.

Species of vine

Passiflora serratodigitata is a liana species of Passiflora with a native range stretching from Panama down to the South American tropics of Brazil, Bolivia, and Peru, and also up in the Caribbean. It bears edible fruit but is mostly consumed locally.
