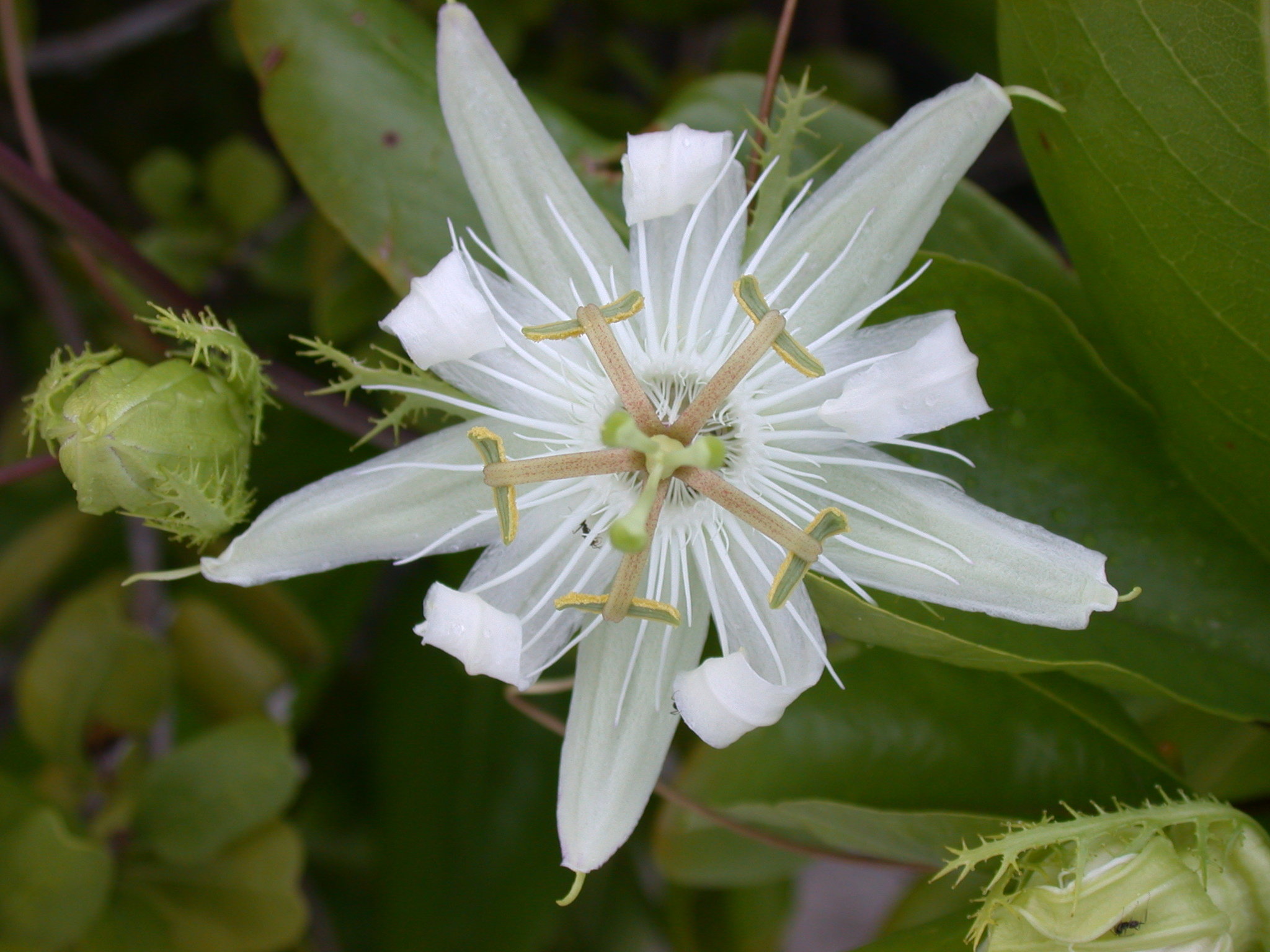

Conservation status
- Least Concern (IUCN 3.1)

Scientific classification
- Kingdom: Plantae
- Clade: Tracheophytes
- Clade: Angiosperms
- Clade: Eudicots
- Clade: Rosids
- Order: Malpighiales
- Family: Passifloraceae
- Genus: Passiflora
- Species: P. pectinata

Binomial name
- Passiflora pectinata Griseb.

= Passiflora pectinata =

Species of vine

Passiflora pectinata is a species of flowering plant native to the West Indies.

== Taxonomy ==
Passiflora pectinata has been assigned to subgenus Passiflora, section Dysosmia.

== Etymology ==
The species is named for the pectinate (comb-shaped) involucral bracts.

== Description ==
The vine is glabrous throughout. The stem is subangular, striate, and rather stout. Stipules are deeply cleft into linear or subulate, gland-tipped segments. Petioles are 1 to 2 cm long, often bearing a few stiff, gland-tipped hairs. Leaves are cordate-deltoid, 4 to 7 cm long, 3 to 6 cm wide, obscurely hastate or not lobed, acute or obtusish at apex, deeply cordate at base, repand-crenulate (often with minute glands in the sinuses of the crenations at the tips of the nerves), 5-nerved, coriaceous, often sublustrous. Peduncles are solitary, 2 to 3 cm long. Bracts are 2 to 3 cm, long pectinate or once pinnatifid (segments gland-tipped, scarcely longer than width of rachis), rarely bipinnatifid, but the rachis at least 2 mm. wide. Flowers are 5 to 8 cm wide, white. Sepals are linear or linear-lanceolate, 2.5 to 3.5 cm long, 5 to 8 mm wide at base, obtuse, corniculate just below apex, the horn being up to 7 mm long, subfoliaceous. Petals are linear, 2 to 3 cm. long, 4 to 6 mm wide, obtuse, white. Coronal filaments are in several series, with the 2 outer narrowly ligulate, the outermost 1 to 1.5 cm long, the second 6 to 8 mm long, the succeeding 2 or 3 series consisting of filiform threads 2 to 3 mm long. The operculum is membranous, barely 1 mm high, denticulate. The ovary is ovoid, tapering at apex. Fruit is subglobose, 2 to 3 cm in diameter, deep pink. Seeds are oblong, about 5 mm. long, 4 mm. wide, tridentate at apex, shallowly coarsely reticulate.

== Distribution and habitat ==
Passiflora pectinata is native to the Bahamas, Bermuda, Hispaniola (the Dominican Republic and Haiti) and the Turks and Caicos, where it is frequently found growing in sand dunes and low scrub.
