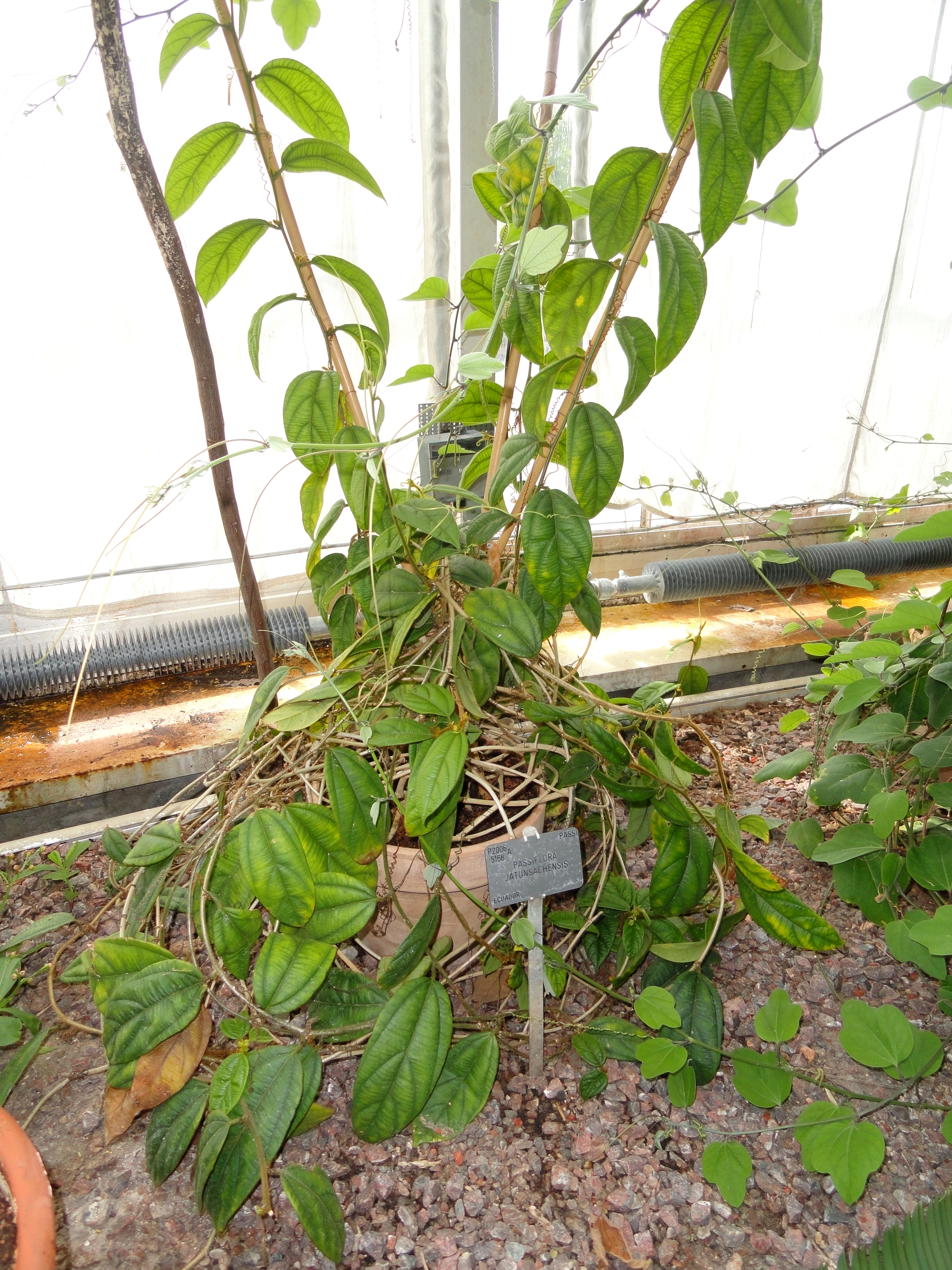

Conservation status
- Vulnerable (IUCN 3.1)

Scientific classification
- Kingdom: Plantae
- Clade: Embryophytes
- Clade: Tracheophytes
- Clade: Angiosperms
- Clade: Eudicots
- Clade: Rosids
- Order: Malpighiales
- Family: Passifloraceae
- Genus: Passiflora
- Species: P. jatunsachensis

Binomial name
- Passiflora jatunsachensis Schwerdtfeger

= Passiflora jatunsachensis =

Species of vine

Passiflora jatunsachensis is a species of plant in the family Passifloraceae. It is endemic to Ecuador.
