= Passiflora viridescens =

Scientific classification
- Kingdom: Plantae
- Clade: Tracheophytes
- Clade: Angiosperms
- Clade: Eudicots
- Clade: Rosids
- Order: Malpighiales
- Family: Passifloraceae
- Genus: Passiflora
- Species: P. viridescens

Binomial name
- Passiflora viridescens L.K.Escobar

Synonyms
- Passiflora cuspidifolia Holm-Nielson 1988, auct non Harms 1893; Passiflora ulmeri Schwerdtfeger

Species of plant

Passiflora viridescens is a plant species native to Peru and Ecuador.

Passiflora viridescens is a woody liana climbing over other vegetation to a height of over 8 m. Leaves are broadly lanceolate to ovate, up to 14 cm long, forming three points at the tip in a W-shaped pattern. Flowers are up to 10 cm in diameter, light green with purple styles. The fruit is elliptical to egg-shaped, up to 6 cm long, green with minute hairs.
