= Passiflora sprucei =

Conservation status
- Least Concern (IUCN 3.1)

Scientific classification
- Kingdom: Plantae
- Clade: Tracheophytes
- Clade: Angiosperms
- Clade: Eudicots
- Clade: Rosids
- Order: Malpighiales
- Family: Passifloraceae
- Genus: Passiflora
- Species: P. sprucei

Binomial name
- Passiflora sprucei Mast.

Species of vine

Passiflora sprucei is a species of flowering plant in the family Passifloraceae. It is found in western Ecuador and Northern Peru.
