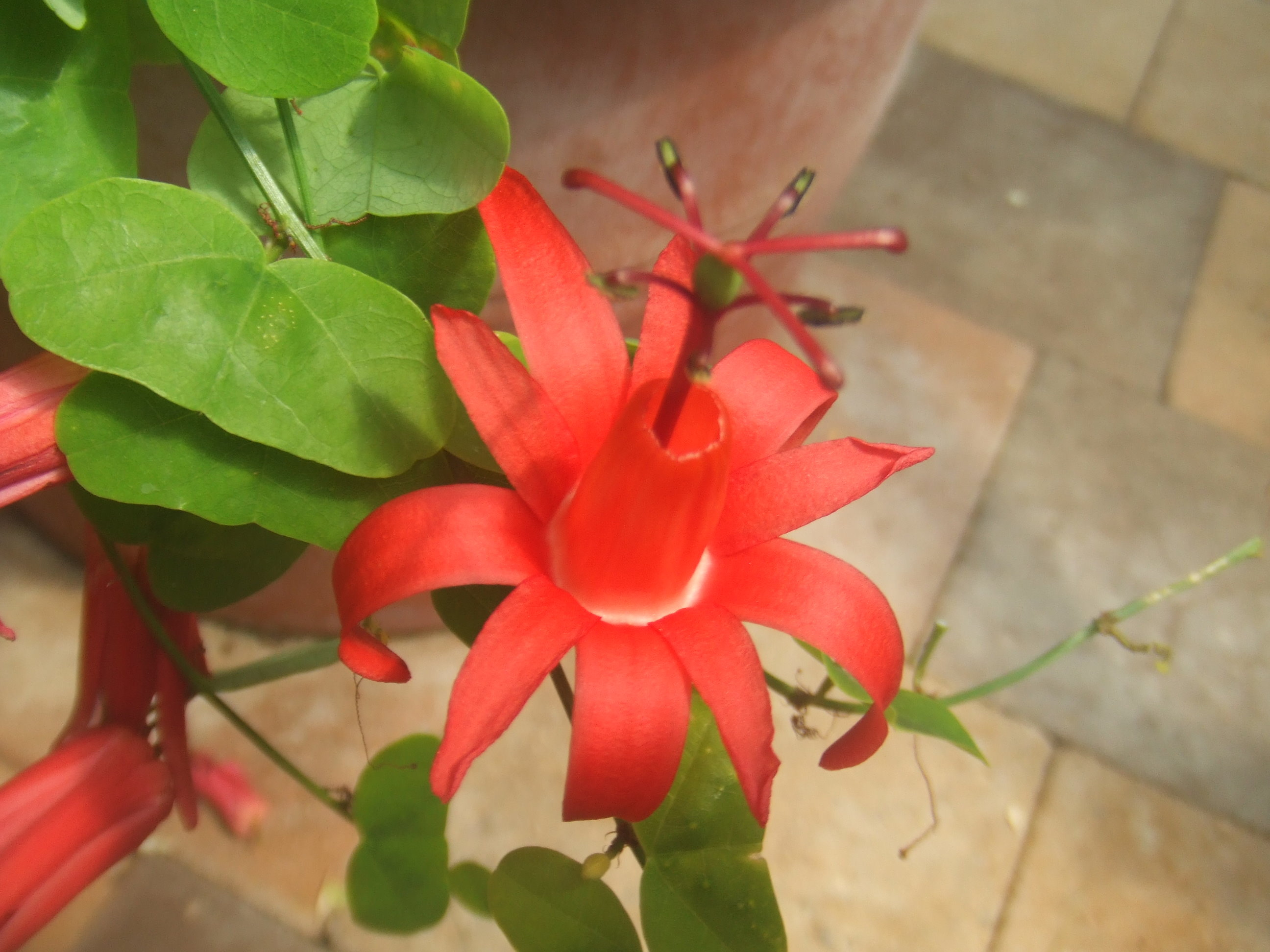

Scientific classification
- Kingdom: Plantae
- Clade: Tracheophytes
- Clade: Angiosperms
- Clade: Eudicots
- Clade: Rosids
- Order: Malpighiales
- Family: Passifloraceae
- Genus: Passiflora
- Species: P. murucuja

Binomial name
- Passiflora murucuja L.

= Passiflora murucuja =

Species of vine

Passiflora murucuja, the Virgin Islands passionflower, is a species in the family Passifloraceae. It is a fragrant Passion flower.
