= P. macrophylla =

P. macrophylla may refer to different species of plants, animals, algae, and fungi. The specific epithet macrophylla derives from Greek μακροϛ (macros) and φυλλον (phyllon) and means 'large leaves'.

- Padina macrophylla, a seaweed in the family Dictyotaceae
- Paeonia macrophylla, now called Paeonia daurica subsp. macrophylla, a plant in the family Paeoniaceae
- Pagamea macrophylla, a plant in the family Rubiaceae
- Pancovia macrophylla, a plant in the family Sapindaceae
- Paradrymonia macrophylla, a plant in the family Gesneriaceae
- Paralyxia macrophylla, a plant in the family Apocynaceae
- Paramitranthes macrophylla, now called Siphoneugena densiflora, a plant in the family Myrtaceae
- Parashorea macrophylla, a plant in the family Dipterocarpaceae
- Paravallaris macrophylla, a plant in the family Apocynaceae
- Parietaria macrophylla, a plant in the family Urticaceae
- Parinari macrophylla, now called Neocarya macrophylla, a plant in the family Chrysobalanaceae
- Parmeliella macrophylla, a lichen in the family Pannariaceae
- Parmentiera macrophylla, a plant in the family Bignoniaceae
- Parsonsia macrophylla, a plant in the family Apocynaceae
- Passiflora macrophylla, a plant in the family Passifloraceae
- Paullinia macrophylla, a plant in the family Sapindaceae
- Pavetta macrophylla, a plant in the family Rubiaceae
- Pavonia macrophylla, a plant in the family Malvaceae
- Paxistima macrophylla, a plant in the family Celastraceae
- Payena macrophylla, a plant in the family Sapotaceae
- Peckia macrophylla, a plant in the family Primulaceae
- Pedersenia macrophylla, a plant in the family Amaranthaceae
- Peixotoa macrophylla, a plant in the family Malpighiaceae
- Peliosanthes macrophylla, a plant in the family Asparagaceae
- Pellionia macrophylla, a plant in the family Urticaceae
- Pentace macrophylla, a plant in the family Malvaceae
- Pentaclethra macrophylla, a plant in the family Fabaceae
- Pentagonia macrophylla, a plant in the family Rubiaceae
- Peperomia macrophylla, a plant in the family Piperaceae
- Peplonia macrophylla, a plant in the family Apocynaceae
- Perebea macrophylla, a plant in the family Moraceae
- Persicaria macrophylla, now called Bistorta macrophylla, a plant in the family Polygonaceae
- Pertya macrophylla, a plant in the family Asteraceae
- Petrea macrophylla, a plant in the family Verbenaceae
- Phelline macrophylla, a plant in the family Phellinaceae
- Phinaea macrophylla, a plant in the family Gesneriaceae
- Phlomis macrophylla, a plant in the family Lamiaceae
- Phlomoides macrophylla, a plant in the family Lamiaceae
- Phoebe macrophylla, a plant in the family Lauraceae
- Phreatia macrophylla, a plant in the family Orchidaceae
- Phthirusa macrophylla, a plant in the family Loranthaceae
- Phyllophaga macrophylla, a scarab beetle in the family Scarabaeidae
- Phylloserica macrophylla, a beetle in the family Melolonthidae
- Phyllostegia macrophylla, a plant in the family Lamiaceae
- Physcia macrophylla, a lichen in the family Physciaceae
- Physochlaina macrophylla, a plant in the family Solanaceae
- Phytocrene macrophylla, a plant in the family Icacinaceae
- Pilea macrophylla, a plant in the family Urticaceae
- Pimelandra macrophylla, a plant in the family Primulaceae
- Pimpinella macrophylla, a plant in the family Apiaceae
- Pinguicula macrophylla, a plant in the family Lentibulariaceae
- Piptocoma macrophylla, a plant in the family Asteraceae
- Piresia macrophylla, a plant in the family Poaceae
- Pistacia macrophylla, a plant in the family Anacardiaceae
- Plantago macrophylla, a plant in the family Plantaginaceae
- Platanthera macrophylla, a plant in the family Orchidaceae
- Plectronia macrophylla, a plant in the family Rubiaceae
- Pleiospora macrophylla, a plant in the family Fabaceae
- Pleiotaxis macrophylla, a plant in the family Asteraceae
- Pleopeltis macrophylla, a plant in the family Polypodiaceae
- Plettkea macrophylla, a plant in the family Caryophyllaceae
- Pleurothallis macrophylla, a plant in the family Orchidaceae
- Pluchea macrophylla, a plant in the family Asteraceae
- Pneumonanthe macrophylla, a plant in the family Gentianaceae
- Podandrogyne macrophylla, a plant in the family Cleomaceae
- Podocarpus macrophylla, a plant in the family Podocarpaceae
- Poecilochroma macrophylla, a plant in the family Solanaceae
- Pogonia macrophylla, a plant in the family Orchidaceae
- Poikilogyne macrophylla, a plant in the family Melastomataceae
- Pojarkovia macrophylla, a plant in the family Asteraceae
- Pollalesta macrophylla, a plant in the family Asteraceae
- Pollia macrophylla, a plant in the family Commelinaceae
- Polyadenia macrophylla, a plant in the family Lauraceae
- Polygonella macrophylla, now called Polygonum smallianum, a plant in the family Polygonaceae
- Polymnia macrophylla, a plant in the family Asteraceae
- Polysphaeria macrophylla, a plant in the family Rubiaceae
- Polytoca macrophylla, a plant in the family Poaceae
- Pottia macrophylla, a plant in the family Pottiaceae
- Pouteria macrophylla, a plant in the family Sapotaceae
- Premna macrophylla, now called Premna serratifolia, a plant in the family Lamiaceae
- Prenanthes macrophylla, a plant in the family Asteraceae
- Prestonia macrophylla, a plant in the family Apocynaceae
- Primula macrophylla, a plant in the family Primulaceae
- Protomegabaria macrophylla, a plant in the family Phyllanthaceae
- Prunus macrophylla, now called Prunus zippeliana, a plant in the family Rosaceae
- Psammisia macrophylla, a plant in the family Ericaceae
- Pseudarthria macrophylla, a plant in the family Fabaceae
- Pseudobaccharis macrophylla, a plant in the family Asteraceae
- Pseudolmedia macrophylla, a plant in the family Moraceae
- Pseudomantalania macrophylla, a plant in the family Rubiaceae
- Pseudotrewia macrophylla, a plant in the family Euphorbiaceae
- Pseuduvaria macrophylla, a plant in the family Annonaceae
- Psoralea macrophylla, a plant in the family Fabaceae
- Psychotria macrophylla, a plant in the family Rubiaceae
- Ptarmica macrophylla, a plant in the family Asteraceae
- Pteris macrophylla, a plant in the family Pteridaceae
- Pycnocoma macrophylla, a plant in the family Euphorbiaceae
- Pycnophyllopsis macrophylla, a plant in the family Caryophyllaceae
- Pyrostria macrophylla, a plant in the family Rubiaceae

== See also ==
- P. macrophyllum
- P. microphyllus
- P. microphylla
