= P. microphylla =

P. microphylla may refer to different species of plants, algae, fungi, and even animals. The specific epithet microphylla derives from Greek μικροϛ (micros) and φυλλον (phyllon) and means 'small leaves'.

- Pannaria microphylla, a lichen in the family Pannariaceae
- Paraerva microphylla, a plant in the family Amaranthaceae
- Paraquilegia microphylla, a plant in the family Ranunculaceae
- Paratrophis microphylla, a tree in the family Moraceae
- Paravallaris microphylla, a plant in the family Apocynaceae
- Parietaria microphylla, a plant in the family Parietarieae
- Parkinsonia microphylla, a palo verde tree in the family Fabaceae
- Parmelia microphylla, a lichen in the family Parmeliaceae
- Parmeliella microphylla, a lichen in the family Pannariaceae
- Paronychia microphylla, a plant in the family Paronychieae
- Parosela microphylla, a plant in the family Fabaceae
- Passerina microphylla, a plant in the family Thymelaeaceae
- Patellaria microphylla, a fungus in the family Patellariaceae
- Pauridiantha microphylla, a plant in the family Rubiaceae
- Pavetta microphylla, a plant in the family Rubiaceae
- Payena microphylla, a tree in the family Sapotaceae
- Pedicularis microphylla, a plant in the family Orobanchaceae
- Peixotoa microphylla, a plant in the family Malpighiaceae
- Pellaea microphylla, currently called Argyrochosma microphylla, a fern in the family Pteridaceae
- Pellegrinia microphylla, a plant in the family Ericaceae
- Peltigera microphylla, a lichen in the family Peltigeraceae
- Penaea microphylla, a plant in the family Penaeaceae
- Pentameris microphylla, a plant in the family Poaceae
- Pentanisia microphylla, a plant in the family Rubiaceae
- Pentaschistis microphylla, a plant in the family Poaceae
- Pentzia microphylla, a plant in the family Asteraceae
- Peperomia microphylla, a plant in the family Piperoideae
- Pernettya microphylla, a plant in the family Ericaceae
- Persea microphylla, a plant in the family Lauraceae
- Persoonia microphylla, a plant in the family Proteaceae
- Phaca microphylla, a plant in the family Fabaceae
- Phaulopsis microphylla, a plant in the family Acanthaceae
- Philistina microphylla, a beetle in the family Cetoniidae
- Phlomis microphylla, a plant in the family Lamiaceae
- Phoebe microphylla, a plant in the family Lauraceae
- Phthirusa microphylla, a plant in the family Loranthaceae
- Phyllophaga microphylla, a scarab beetle in the family Scarabaeidae
- Phyllostachys microphylla, a bamboo in the family Poaceae
- Phyllostegia microphylla, a plant in the family Lamiaceae
- Physcia microphylla, a lichen in the family Physciaceae
- Pilea microphylla, a plant the family Urticaceae
- Pimelea microphylla, a plant in the family Thymelaeaceae
- Pinalia microphylla, a plant in the family Orchidaceae
- Piptadenia microphylla, currently Anadenanthera colubrina var. cebil, a plant in the family Fabaceae
- Pisonia microphylla, a plant in the family Nyctaginaceae
- Pityrogramma microphylla, a plant in the family Pteridaceae
- Placopsis microphylla, a lichen in the family Agyriaceae
- Plagiochila microphylla, a plant in the family Plagiochilaceae
- Planchonella microphylla, a plant in the family Sapotaceae
- Platea microphylla, a plant in the family Icacinaceae
- Plectaneia microphylla, a plant in the family Apocynaceae
- Pleione microphylla, a plant in the family Orchidaceae
- Pleurothallis microphylla, a plant in the family Orchidaceae
- Podalyria microphylla, a plant in the family Fabaceae
- Podospadix microphylla, a plant in the family Araceae
- Poincianella microphylla, a plant in the family Fabaceae
- Polygala microphylla, a plant in the family Polygalaceae
- Polylepis microphylla, a plant in the family Rosaceae
- Popowia microphylla, a plant in the family Annonaceae
- Porandra microphylla, a plant in the family Commelinaceae
- Poranthera microphylla, a plant in the family Phyllanthaceae
- Porlieria microphylla, a plant in the family Zygophyllaceae
- Porphyra microphylla, a seaweed in the family Bangiaceae
- Portulaca microphylla, currently known as Portulaca quadrifida, a plant in the family Portulacaceae
- Potameia microphylla, a plant in the family Lauraceae
- Potentilla microphylla, currently known as Argentina microphylla, a plant in the family Rosaceae
- Praravinia microphylla, a plant in the family Rubiaceae
- Premna microphylla, a tree in the family Lamiaceae
- Primula microphylla, a plant in the family Primulaceae
- Prostanthera microphylla, a plant in the family Westringieae
- Prunus microphylla, a shrub in the family Rosaceae
- Pseudoleskea microphylla, a plant in the family Leskeaceae
- Psora microphylla, a lichen in the family Psoraceae
- Psychotria microphylla, a plant in the family Rubiaceae
- Ptelea microphylla, a plant in the family Rutaceae
- Pteris microphylla, a fern in the family Pteridaceae
- Pteronia microphylla, a plant in the family Asteraceae
- Pterostylis microphylla, a plant in the family Orchidaceae
- Pultenaea microphylla, a plant in the family Fabaceae
- Purdiaea microphylla, a plant in the family Clethraceae
- Putoria microphylla, a plant in the family Rubiaceae
- Pyrenaria microphylla, a plant in the family Theaceae
- Pyrus microphylla, currently called Cotoneaster microphyllus, a plant in the family Rosaceae

== See also ==
- P. macrophyllum
- P. microphyllus
- P. macrophylla
