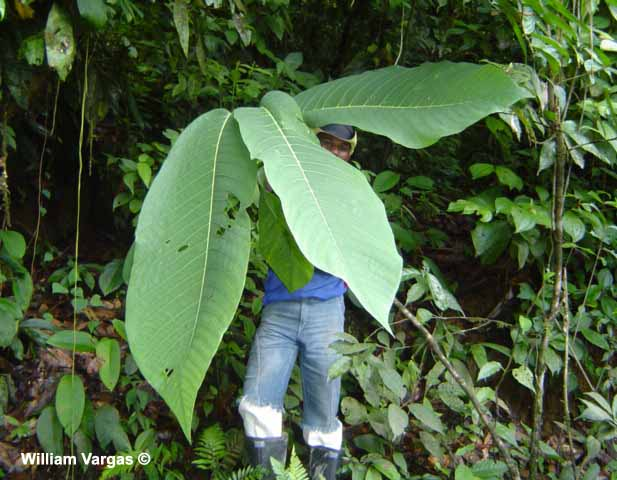
- Passiflora macrophylla

Scientific classification
- Kingdom: Plantae
- Clade: Tracheophytes
- Clade: Angiosperms
- Clade: Eudicots
- Clade: Rosids
- Order: Malpighiales
- Family: Passifloraceae
- Genus: Passiflora
- Subgenus: Passiflora subg. Astrophea (DC.) Mast. (1871)

Type species
- Passiflora glauca Dryand.

Species
- See text

Synonyms
- Astrophea Lam. ex M.Roem.

= Passiflora subg. Astrophea =

Subgenus of flowering plants

Passiflora subg. Astrophea is a group of Passiflora species that are lianas, shrubs and trees found in South America.

== Taxonomy ==
It was first published as Passiflora sect. Astrophea DC. by Augustin Pyramus de Candolle in 1822. The lectotype is Passiflora glauca. It was elevated to the subgenus Passiflora subg. Astrophea (DC.) Mast. published by Maxwell T. Masters in 1871.

=== Species ===
Supersection	Section	Series	Image	Scientific name	Distribution
Astrophea	Astrophea			Passiflora araguensis	Venezuela (Aragua, Distrito Federal, and Miranda)
Astrophea	Astrophea			Passiflora arborea	Colombia (Antioquia, Boyacá, Caldas, Cundinamarca, Huila, Magdalena, Nariño, Quindío, Risaralda, Tolima, Valle del Cauca), Ecuador (Morona-Santiago and Zamora-Chinchipe), Peru (Cajamarca)
Astrophea	Astrophea			Passiflora callistemma	Colombia (Bolívar)
Astrophea	Astrophea			Passiflora caucaense	Colombia (Cauca department)
Astrophea	Astrophea			Passiflora emarginata	Colombia (Cauca, Chocó, Nariño, Tolima, Valle del Cauca)
Astrophea	Astrophea			Passiflora engleriana	Colombia (Antioquia and Cundinamarca)
Astrophea	Astrophea			Passiflora frutescens	Peru (Huánuco)
Astrophea	Astrophea			Passiflora lindeniana	Colombia (Norte de Santander), Venezuela (Aragua, Falcón, and Mérida)
Astrophea	Astrophea			Passiflora macrophylla	Colombia (Antioquia and Chocó), Ecuador (Bolívar, Cañar, Chimborazo, Cotopaxi, El Oro, Esmeraldas, Guayas, Loja, Los Ríos, Manabí, Napo, Pichincha, Santo Domingo de los Tsáchilas), Panama (Darién)
Astrophea	Astrophea			Passiflora ocanensis	Colombia (Norte de Santander)
Astrophea	Astrophea			Passiflora ovata	Colombia (Magdalena), French Guiana (Cayenne), Guyana, Venezuela (Bolívar)
Astrophea	Astrophea			Passiflora pubera	Colombia (Antioquia, Huila, Magdalena, Santander, Tolima, and Valle del Cauca)
Astrophea	Astrophea			Passiflora putumayensis	Colombia (Caquetá), Ecuador (Napo and Zamora-Chinchipe), Peru (Amazonas and Pasco)
Astrophea	Astrophea			Passiflora schultzei	Colombia (Cundinamarca)
Astrophea	Astrophea			Passiflora sphaerocarpa	Colombia (Cundinamarca, Norte de Santander, Putumayo, Risaralda, Santander, Tolima, Valle de Cauca)
Astrophea	Astrophea			Passiflora tica	Colombia (Antioquia and Chocó), Costa Rica (Alajuela, Cartago, Guanacaste, Heredia, Limón, San José), Panama (Bocas del Toro, Chiriquí, Colón, Darién, Panamá, San Blas)
Astrophea	Capreolata			Passiflora cauliflora	Colombia (Amazonas and Vichada), Ecuador (Napo), Peru (Amazonas, Loreto, Madre de Dios, San Martín, Ucayali), Venezuela (Amazonas)
Astrophea	Capreolata			Passiflora ceratocarpa	Brazil (Maranhão and Pará)
Astrophea	Capreolata			Passiflora cerradensis	Brazil (Mato Grosso)
Astrophea	Capreolata			Passiflora faroana	Brazil (Amazonas, Maranhão, and Pará)
Astrophea	Capreolata			Passiflora haughtii	Colombia (Santander)
Astrophea	Capreolata			Passiflora hexagonocarpa	Brazil (Rondônia and Amazonas)
Astrophea	Capreolata			Passiflora jussieui	French Guiana
Astrophea	Capreolata			Passiflora maguirei	Guyana (Mazaruni-Potaro), Venezuela (Amazonas)
Astrophea	Capreolata			Passiflora mariquitensis	Colombia (Tolima)
Astrophea	Capreolata			Passiflora mutisii	Colombia
Astrophea	Capreolata			Passiflora nuriensis	Venezuela (Bolívar)
Astrophea	Capreolata			Passiflora pittieri	Belize (Toledo), Bolivia (Santa Cruz), Colombia (Antioquia, Chocó, Tolima), Costa Rica (Alajuela, Guanacaste, Heredia, Puntarenas), Guatemala (Izabal), Nicaragua (Atlántico Sur and Río San Juan), Panama (Chiriquí, Colón, Darién, Panamá, San Blas, Veraguas)
Astrophea	Capreolata			Passiflora quelchii	Guyana (Rupununi) and Suriname (Sipaliwini)
Astrophea	Capreolata			Passiflora tina	Ecuador (Esmeraldas and Pichincha)
Astrophea	Leptopoda			Passiflora leptopoda	Brazil (Amazonas and Roraima), Guyana (Runpununi), Suriname (Sipaliwini)
Astrophea	Leptopoda			Passiflora plumosa	French Guiana (Sommet Tabulaire)
Pseudoastrophea	Pseudoastrophea			Passiflora alliacea	Brazil (Rio de Janeiro)
Pseudoastrophea	Pseudoastrophea			Passiflora candida	Brazil (Amazonas and Pará), French Guiana (Cayenne), Guyana (Essequibo)
Pseudoastrophea	Pseudoastrophea			Passiflora cardonae	Venezuela (Bolívar and Amazonas)
Pseudoastrophea	Pseudoastrophea			Passiflora chlorina	Brazil (Mina Gerais)
Pseudoastrophea	Pseudoastrophea			Passiflora cirrhipes	Peru (San Martín)
Pseudoastrophea	Pseudoastrophea			Passiflora costata	Brazil (Amapá, Amazonas, Pará, Rondônia), Guyana (Essequibo and Mazaruni-Potaro), Peru (Amazonas and Loreto); Suriname (Brokopondo, Coronie, Sipaliwini districts), Venezuela (Amazonas and Bolívar)
Pseudoastrophea	Pseudoastrophea			Passiflora deficiens	Guyana (Mazaruni-Potaro)
Pseudoastrophea	Pseudoastrophea			Passiflora elliptica	Brazil (Bahia and Rio de Janeiro)
Pseudoastrophea	Pseudoastrophea			Passiflora grandis	Colombia (Norte de Santander)
Pseudoastrophea	Pseudoastrophea			Passiflora haematostigma	Brazil (Minas Gerais, Paraná, Rio de Janeiro, São Paulo)
Pseudoastrophea	Pseudoastrophea			Passiflora kawensis	French Guiana (Cayenne)
Pseudoastrophea	Pseudoastrophea			Passiflora mansoi	Brazil (Mato Grosso, Mato Grosso do Sul, Minas Gerais, and Rio Grande do Sul)
Pseudoastrophea	Pseudoastrophea			Passiflora pentagona	Brazil (Espírito Santo and Rio de Janeiro)
Pseudoastrophea	Pseudoastrophea			Passiflora phaeocaula	Colombia (Guainía), Brazil (Amazonas)
Pseudoastrophea	Pseudoastrophea			Passiflora rhamnifolia	Brazil (Bahia, Minas Gerais, and Rio de Janeiro)
Pseudoastrophea	Pseudoastrophea			Passiflora sclerophylla	Guyana, Venezuela (Amazonas and Bolívar)
Pseudoastrophea	Pseudoastrophea			Passiflora skiantha	Ecuador (Orellana) and Peru (Loreto)
Pseudoastrophea	Pseudoastrophea			Passiflora tessmannii	Ecuador (Sucumbíos), Peru (Loreto and San Martín)
Pseudoastrophea	Pseudoastrophea			Passiflora trochlearis	Ecuador (Pichincha)
Pseudoastrophea	Pseudoastrophea			Passiflora venosa	Bolivia (Cochabamba and La Paz)
Pseudoastrophea	Pseudoastrophea			Passiflora vescoi	French Guiana (Cacao)
Pseudoastrophea	Botryastrophea	Botryastrophea		Passiflora aurantiflorescentis	Venezuela
Pseudoastrophea	Botryastrophea	Botryastrophea		Passiflora holtii	Brazil (Amazonas and Goiás), Colombia (Guainía and Vaupés), Peru (Lorento), Venezuela (Amazonas)
Pseudoastrophea	Botryastrophea	Botryastrophea		Passiflora pyrrhantha	Colombia (Guaviare), Ecuador (Morona-Santiago, Napo, Pastaza, Sucumbíos, Zamora-Chinchipe), Peru (Amazonas, Loreto and San Martín), Venezuela (Amazonas, Mérida and Táchira)
Pseudoastrophea	Botryastrophea	Botryastrophea		Passiflora rusbyi	Bolivia (Pando), Brazil (Acre and Amazonas), Ecuador (Napo)
Pseudoastrophea	Botryastrophea	Botryastrophea		Passiflora securiclata	Brazil (Acre and Roraima), Colombia (Caquetá, Meta, and Vichada), Guyana (Essequibo), Venezuela (Amazonas, Anzoátegui, Apure, Bolívar, Delta Amacuro, Zulia)
Pseudoastrophea	Botryastrophea	Botryastrophea		Passiflora spicata	Brazil (Amazonas)
Pseudoastrophea	Botryastrophea	Botryastrophea		Passiflora spinosa	Bolivia (Beni and Pando), Brazil (Amazonas, Pará, Paraíba, Roraima); Colombia (Amazonas, Antioquia, Caquetá, Córdoba, Cundinamarca, Santander), Ecuador (Zamora-Chinchipe, Napo, Orellana, Morona-Santiago), Peru (Amazonas, Loreto, Madre de Dios, San Martín, Ucayali), Venezuela (Amazonas)
Pseudoastrophea	Botryastrophea	Botryastrophea		Passiflora amoena	French Guiana and Guyana
Pseudoastrophea	Botryastrophea	Botryastrophea		Passiflora ascidia	Venezuela (Bolívar) and Guyana (Potaro-Siparuni)
Pseudoastrophea	Botryastrophea	Botryastrophea		Passiflora balbis	Brazil (Roraima and Amazonas), Guyana (Potaro-Siparuni and Essequibo), Venezuela (Bolívar and Amazonas)
Pseudoastrophea	Botryastrophea	Botryastrophea		Passiflora fuchsiflora	Surinam, French Guiana, Guyana, Brazil (Amapá), Venezuela (Bolívar)
Pseudoastrophea	Botryastrophea	Botryastrophea		Passiflora longiracemosa	Brazil (Pará), Guyana (Takutu and Essequibo)
Pseudoastrophea	Botryastrophea	Botryastrophea		Passiflora saulensis	French Guiana (Saül commune)
