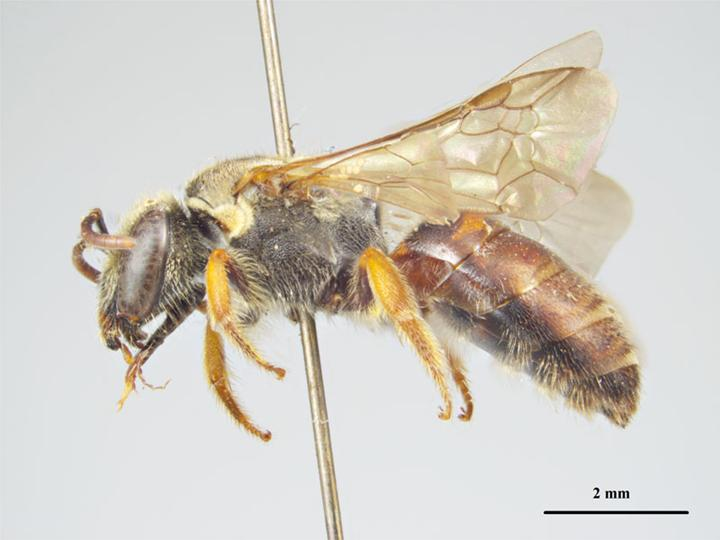
- Female
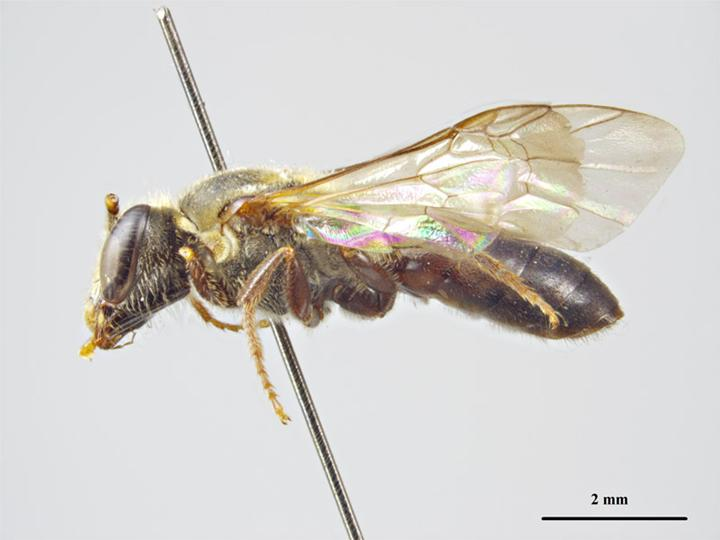
- Male

Scientific classification
- Kingdom: Animalia
- Phylum: Arthropoda
- Clade: Pancrustacea
- Class: Insecta
- Order: Hymenoptera
- Family: Halictidae
- Genus: Lasioglossum
- Species: L. leichardti

Binomial name
- Lasioglossum leichardti (Cockerell, 1906)

Synonyms
- Halictus leichardti Cockerell, 1906; Parasphecodes basilautus Cockerell, 1910; Halictus paracolletinus Cockerell, 1910; Parasphecodes vau Cockerell, 1910; Halictus doddi Cockerell, 1914; Halictus pilicollis Friese, 1924; Halictus scutellatus Friese, 1924

= Lasioglossum leichardti =

Species of bee

Lasioglossum leichardti, or Lasioglossum (Parasphecodes) leichardti, is a species of bee in the family Halictidae and subfamily Halictinae. It is endemic to Australia. It was described by British-American entomologist Theodore Dru Alison Cockerell in 1906.

== Description ==
Integumental colouration is mainly black, with reddish markings.

== Distribution and habitat ==
The species occurs in eastern Australia. Type localities include Mackay and Kuranda.

== Behaviour ==
The adults are flying mellivores. Flowering plants visited by the bees include Pollia, Aotus, Eucalyptus, Lophostemon, Melaleuca, Tristaniopsis, Alphitonia, Canthium, Atalaya and Solanum species.
