= Phylloserica brenskei =

Scientific classification
- Kingdom: Animalia
- Phylum: Arthropoda
- Class: Insecta
- Order: Coleoptera
- Suborder: Polyphaga
- Infraorder: Scarabaeiformia
- Family: Scarabaeidae
- Genus: Phylloserica
- Species: P. brenskei

Binomial name
- Phylloserica brenskei (Brancsik, 1892)

Synonyms
- Pleophylla brenskei Brancsik, 1892

Species of beetle

Phylloserica brenskei is a species of beetle of the family Scarabaeidae. It is found in Madagascar.

== Description ==
Adults reach a length of about 8 mm. They are similar to Phylloserica unicolor, but the raised lines on the elytra are less distinct and the row of larger punctures bearing longer hairs is absent on the outer side of the suture and the primary raised longitudinal lines.
