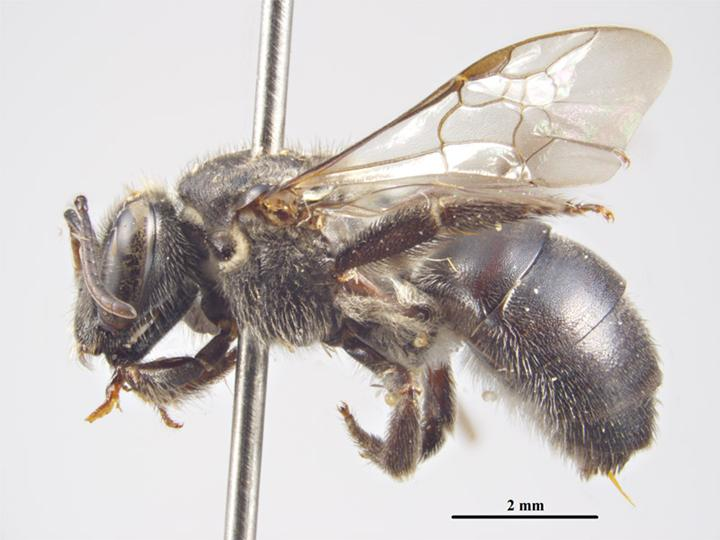
- Female
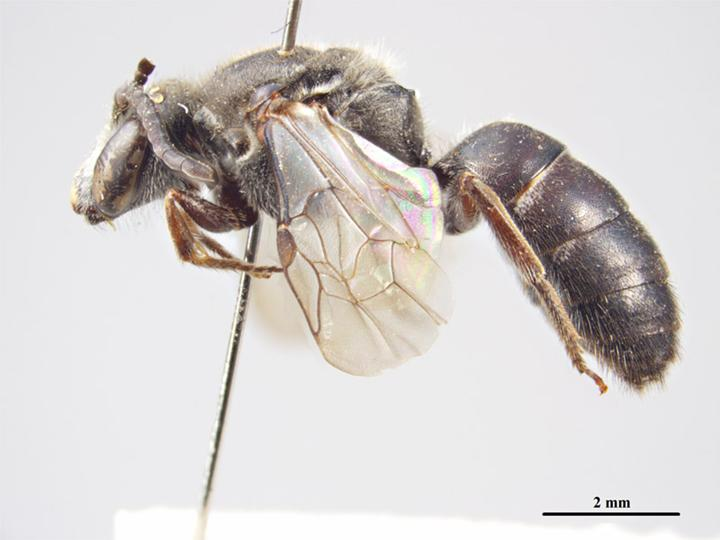
- Male

Scientific classification
- Kingdom: Animalia
- Phylum: Arthropoda
- Clade: Pancrustacea
- Class: Insecta
- Order: Hymenoptera
- Family: Halictidae
- Genus: Lasioglossum
- Species: L. atronitens

Binomial name
- Lasioglossum atronitens (Cockerell, 1914)

Synonyms
- Parasphecodes atronitens Cockerell, 1914; Parasphecodes paramelaenus Cockerell, 1922

= Lasioglossum atronitens =

Species of bee

Lasioglossum atronitens, or Lasioglossum (Parasphecodes) atronitens, is a species of bee in the family Halictidae and subfamily Halictinae. It is endemic to Australia. It was described by British-American entomologist Theodore Dru Alison Cockerell in 1914.

== Description ==
Female body length is about 9.5 mm. Integumental colouration is black, with white to greyish hair.

== Distribution and habitat ==
The species occurs in eastern Australia. Type localities include Caloundra and Lamington National Park.

== Behaviour ==
The adults are flying mellivores. Flowering plants visited by the bees include Pollia, Jacksonia, Leptospermum, Tristaniopsis and Pittosporum species.
