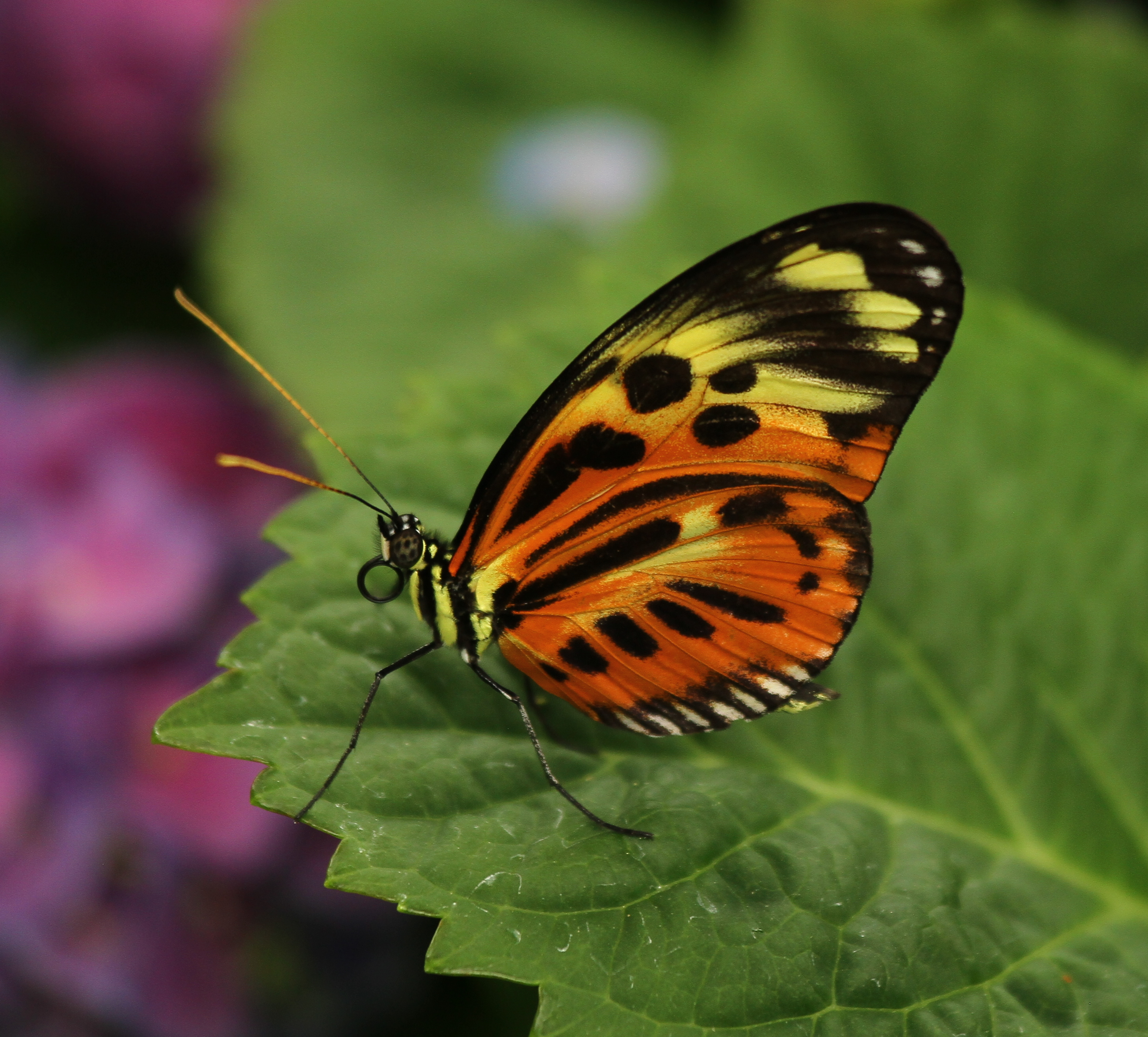
- Heliconius numata, underside
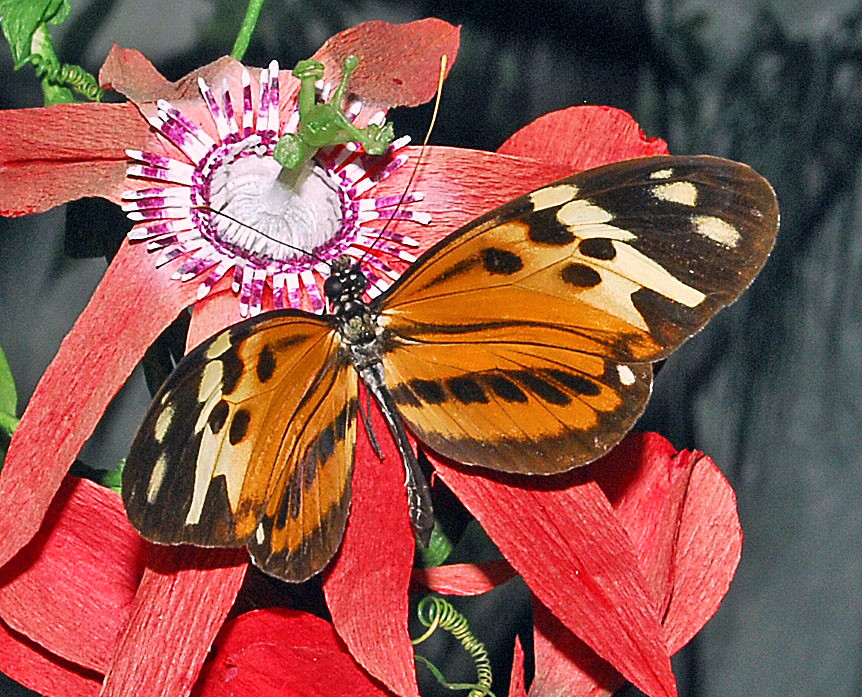
- H. numata on Passiflora flower. Upperside

Scientific classification
- Kingdom: Animalia
- Phylum: Arthropoda
- Clade: Pancrustacea
- Class: Insecta
- Order: Lepidoptera
- Family: Nymphalidae
- Genus: Heliconius
- Species: H. numata

Binomial name
- Heliconius numata (Cramer, 1780)

Subspecies
- 28, see text

Synonyms
- List: Papilio numata Cramer, [1780]; Eueides pione Hübner, 1816; Heliconius numata var. melanops Weymer, 1894; Heliconius numata var. guiensis Riffarth, 1900; Heliconius numata isabellinus f. intermedia Boullet & Le Cerf, 1909; Heliconius numata f. melanopors Joicey & Kaye, 1917; Papilio silvana Stoll, [1781]; Heliconius diffusus Butler, 1873; Heliconius silvana var. divisus Kaye, 1906; Heliconius numata silvaniformis Joicey & Kaye, 1917; Heliconius silvana atakama Neustetter, 1931; Heliconius dryalus Hopffer, 1869; Heliconius ethra ab. brasiliensis Neustetter, 1907; Heliconius ethra var. hopfferi Neustetter, 1907; Heliconia aristiona Hewitson, [1853]; Heliconius aristiona var. peruana Hopffer, 1879; Heliconius aristiona var. splendidus Weymer, 1894; Heliconius aurora Bates, 1862; Heliconius numata var. isabellinus Bates, 1862; Heliconius eupharius Weymer, 1890; Heliconius gordius Weymer, 1894; Heliconius floridus Weymer, 1894; Heliconius seraphion Weymer, 1894; Heliconius gradatus Weymer, 1894; Heliconius aristiona aurora f. michaeli Neustetter, 1931; Heliconius aristiona aurora f. deflavata Neustetter, 1932; Heliconius aristiona idalion f. excelsa Neustetter, 1932; Heliconius euphone C. & R. Felder, 1862; Heliconius idalion Weymer, 1894; Heliconius tleson Riffarth, 1901; Heliconius aganippe Riffarth, 1901; Heliconius aristiona lepidus Riffarth, 1907; Heliconius idalion f. confluens Neustetter, 1912; Heliconius euphone ab. nephele Seitz, 1916; Heliconius euphone ab. confluxus Seitz, 1916; Heliconius aristiona euphorbius Stichel, 1923; Heliconius mixta Apolinar, 1927; Heliconius numatus laura Neustetter, 1932; Heliconius messene C. & R. Felder, 1862; Heliconius sikinos Riffarth, 1901; Heliconius aristiona messene f. juncta Neustetter, 1925; Heliconius aristiona colombiana Apolinar, 1927; Heliconius aristiona messene f. euphrasinus Neustetter, 1928; Heliconius bicoloratus Butler, 1873; Heliconius numatus sincerus Riffarh, 1907; Heliconia numilia Herrich-Schäffer, 1865; Heliconius aulicus Weymer, 1883; Heliconius lenaeus Weymer, 1891; Heliconius colepta Riffarth, 1901; Heliconius lyrcaeus Weymer, 1891; Heliconius timaeus Weymer, 1894; Heliconius geminatus Weymer, 1894; Heliconius mirus var. illustris Weymer, 1894; Heliconius silvana mirificus Stichel, 1906; Heliconius novatus subnutilus Stichel, 1906; Heliconius superioris var. mavors Weymer, 1894; Heliconius numata superioris ab. translata Joicey & Kaye, 1917; Heliconius mirus Weymer, 1894; Heliconius leopardus Weymer, 1894; Heliconius spadicarius Weeks, 1901; Heliconius arethusa Riffarth, 1901; Helicons novatus obscurior Stichel, 1906; Heliconius novatus artemis Riffarth, 1907; Heliconius insolitus Avinoff, 1926; Heliconius novatus f. confluens Neustetter, 1931; Heliconius aristiona tarapotensis Riffarth, 1901; Heliconius staudingeri Weymer, 1894; Heliconius staudingeri var. pretiosus Weymer, 1894; Heliconius aristiona lepidus f. gracilis Riffarth, 1907; Heliconius aristiona timaeus f. aristeus Neustetter, 1931; Heliconius aristiona staudingeri f. lutea Neustetter, 1931

= Heliconius numata =

Numata longwing

Species of butterfly

Heliconius numata, the Numata longwing, is a brush-footed butterfly species belonging to the family Nymphalidae, subfamily Heliconiinae.

== Distribution and habitat ==
This species is native to most of South America, from Venezuela to southern Brazil (Guyana, French Guiana, Surinam, Guatemala, Venezuela, Ecuador, Bolivia, Brazil and Peru). H. numata is a neotropical species, less common in virgin forest than in areas of secondary growth. It occurs at an elevation of 0–1,800 metres (0–5,906 ft) above sea level in tall forests.

== Subspecies ==
Subspecies include:

- Heliconius numata numata (Surinam, French Guiana, Guyana)
- Heliconius numata silvana (Stoll, 1781) (Surinam, Guyana, Venezuela, Guatemala, Brazil: Pará, Amazonas)
- Heliconius numata ethra (Hübner, [1831]) (Brazil: Espírito Santo)
- Heliconius numata aristiona Hewitson, [1853] (Bolivia, Peru)
- Heliconius numata aurora Bates, 1862 (Brazil: Amazonas, Colombia, Bolivia, Peru)
- Heliconius numata euphone C. & R. Felder, 1862 (Colombia, Ecuador)
- Heliconius numata messene C. & R. Felder, 1862 (Colombia)
- Heliconius numata bicoloratus Butler, 1873 (Peru)
- Heliconius numata arcuella Druce, 1874 (Peru)
- Heliconius numata nubifer Butler, 1875 (Brazil: Amazonas)
- Heliconius numata superioris Butler, 1875 (Brazil: Amazonas, Pará, Venezuela)
- Heliconius numata robigus Weymer, 1875 (Venezuela)
- Heliconius numata aulicus Weymer, 1883 (Venezuela)
- Heliconius numata lenaeus Weymer, 1891 (Ecuador)
- Heliconius numata lyrcaeus Weymer, 1891 (Peru)
- Heliconius numata geminatus Weymer, 1894 (Brazil: Amazonas)
- Heliconius numata illustris Weymer, 1894(Peru)
- Heliconius numata mavors Weymer, 1894 (Brazil: Amazonas)
- Heliconius numata mirus Weymer, 1894 (Bolivia)
- Heliconius numata tarapotensis Riffarth, 1901 (Peru)
- Heliconius numata zobrysi Fruhstorfer, 1910 (Brazil: Mato Grosso)
- Heliconius numata ignotus Joicey & Kaye, 1917 (Peru)
- Heliconius numata talboti Joicey & Kaye, 1917 (Peru)
- Heliconius numata pratti Joicey & Kaye, 1917 (Peru)
- Heliconius numata peeblesi Joicey & Talbot, 1925 (Venezuela)
- Heliconius numata jiparanaensis Neustetter, 1931 (Brazil: Rondônia)
- Heliconius numata holzingeri Fernández & Brown, 1976 (Venezuela)
- Heliconius numata sourensis Brown, 1976 (Brazil: Pará)

== Description ==
Heliconius numata has a wingspan of 78 millimetres (3.1 in). These very large butterflies have long and rounded wings of brown and orange color, with very variable markings due to its capacity of mimicry with several species. The caterpillar is white with black spots and black thorns.

== Biology ==
H. numata is known for its mimicry of Melinaea butterflies. Both H. numata and the species of Melinaea it resembles are unpalatable to predators, making this a case of Müllerian mimicry, a mutualistic reinforcement of the same negative signal.

Both males and females are attracted to red or orange flowers, or indeed to pieces of cloth colored red or orange. Eggs typically are found on low-growing vines of Passiflora. Caterpillars mainly feed on plants from the subgenera Granadilla, Astrophea and Distephana (Passifloraceae) and from the genera Tetrastyli and Dilkea.

== Gallery ==
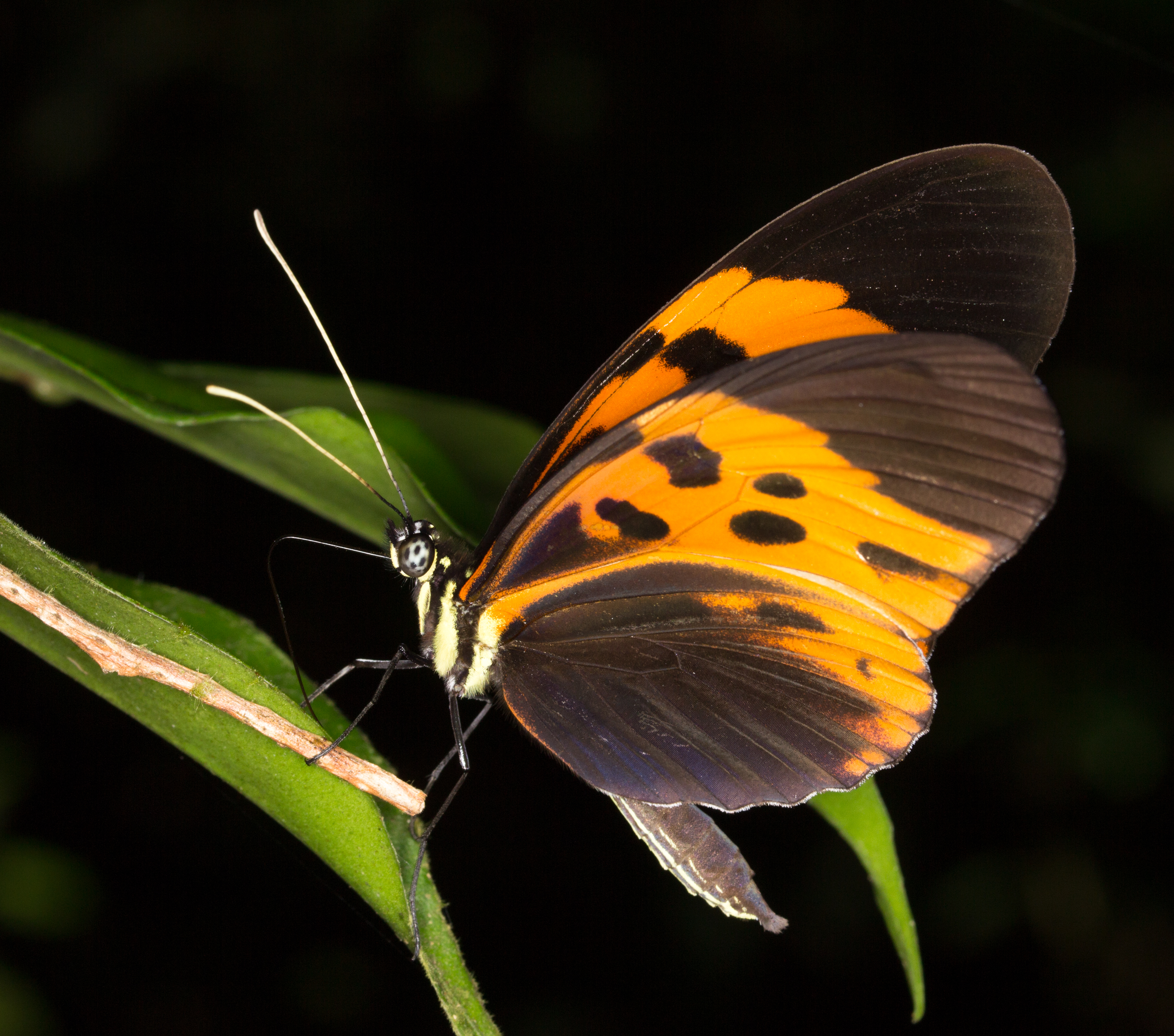
Heliconius numata bicoloratus

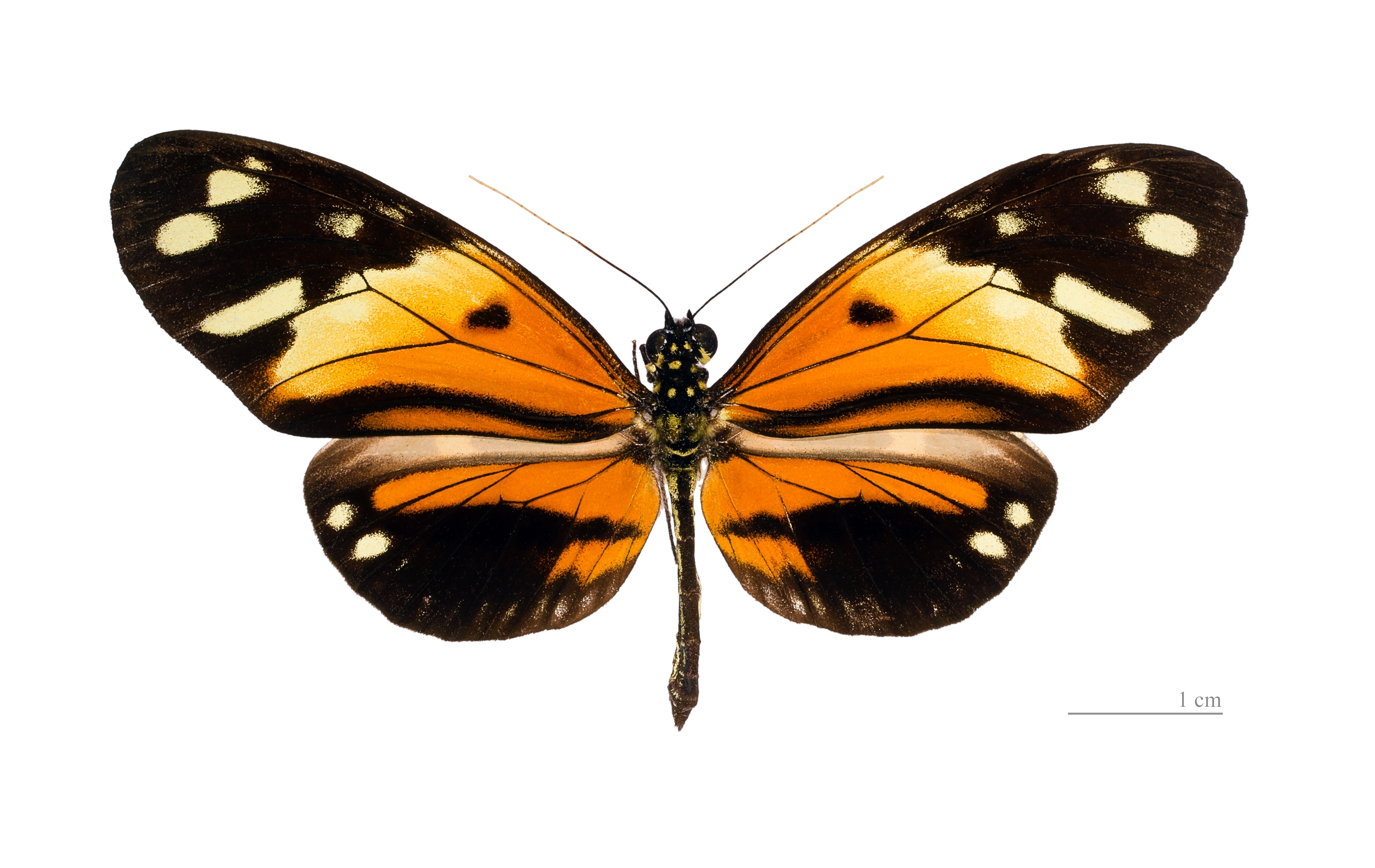
Heliconius numata numata, dorsal, MHNT

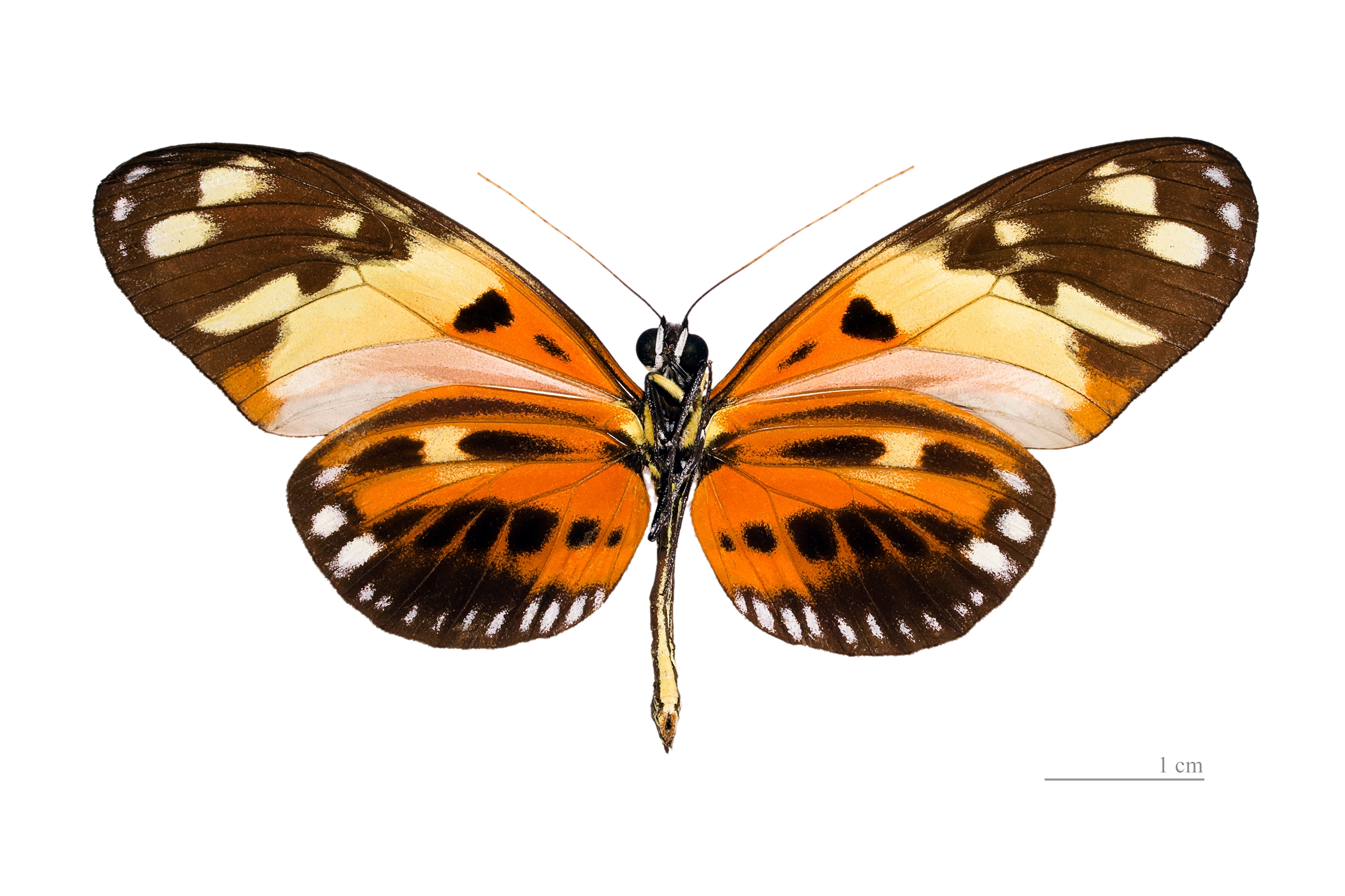
Heliconius numata numata, ventral, MHNT

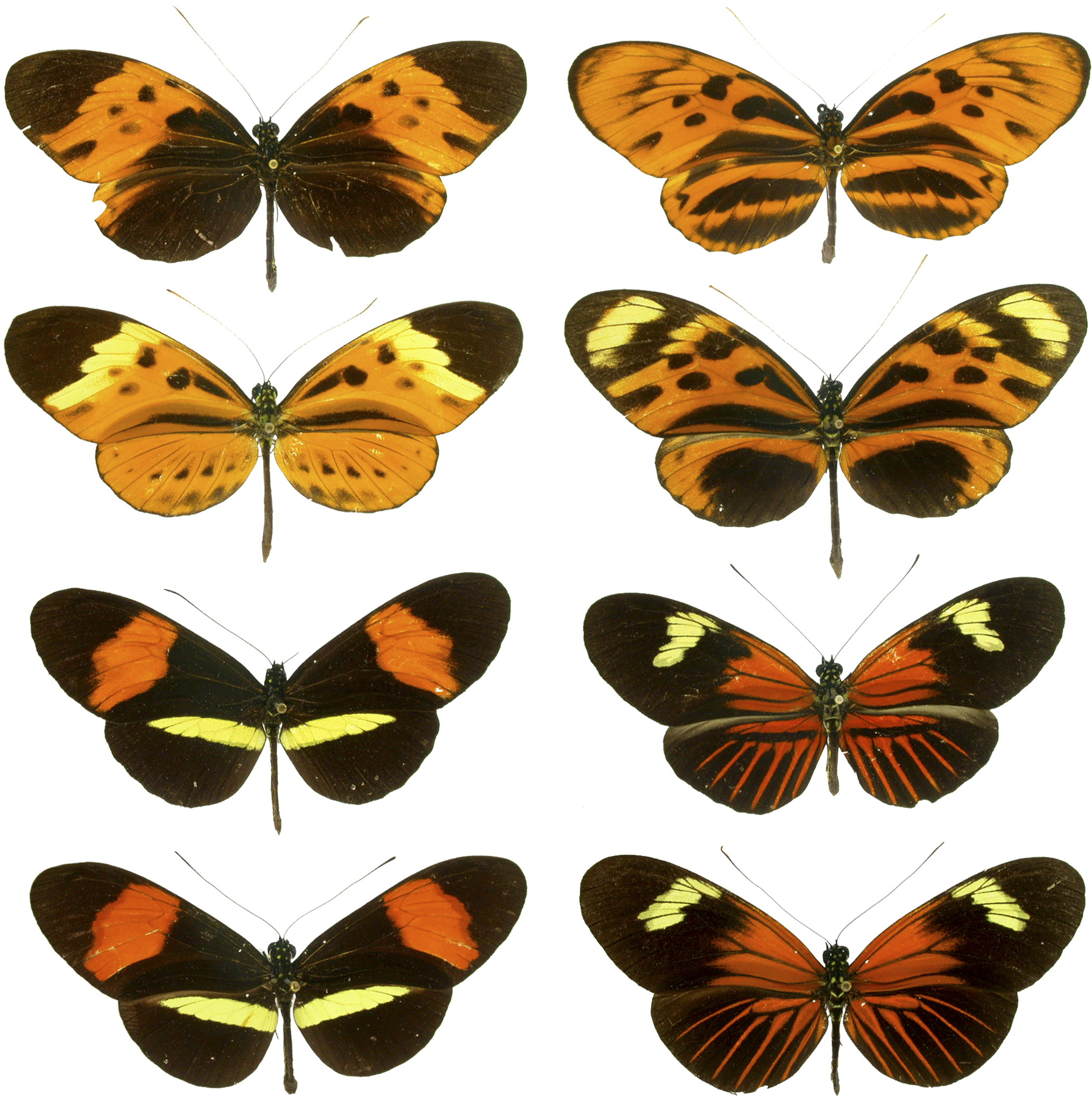
Top four are forms of Heliconius numata, bottom four are H. melpomene and H. erato

== Bibliography ==
- Brown K. S. 1981 The Biology of Heliconius and Related Genera. Annual Review of Entomology 26, 427-456.
- Cramer, Pieter [1721_1776] 1780. De uitlandische Kapellen voorkomende in de drie Waereld-Deelen Asia, Africa en America. Papillons exotiques des trois parties du monde l'Asie, l'Afrique et l'Amérique. Amsteldam, S. J. Baalde; Utrecht, Barthelemy Wild and J. Van Schoonho-ven & Comp.
