= Manse (disambiguation) =

Manse can refer to:

- Manse, a minister's house, usually used in the context of certain Christian traditions
- The Old Manse, a historic house in Massachusetts famous for its American literary associations
- Manse, Nevada, a ghost town
- Manse, a nickname for the city of Tampere, Finland, named after being called the Manchester of Finland
- Manse (만세), the Korean term for ten thousand years
- The Manse Demonstrations, another name for the March 1st Movement
- Mansus or manse, unit of land assessment in medieval France
- Manse (DJ), Swedish DJ, born Michael Hansen

== See also ==
- The Manse (disambiguation)
- Mosses from an Old Manse, a short story collection by Nathaniel Hawthorne
- MAN SE
