= The Manse =

The Manse may refer to:

- The Manse (Northampton, Massachusetts), listed on the NRHP in Massachusetts
- The Manse (Natchez, Mississippi), listed on the NRHP in Mississippi
- The Manse, Mount Druitt, a museum in Sydney, Australia

== See also ==
- Manse (disambiguation)
