= Siphoneugena crassifolia =

Conservation status
- Least Concern (IUCN 3.1)

Scientific classification
- Kingdom: Plantae
- Clade: Tracheophytes
- Clade: Angiosperms
- Clade: Eudicots
- Clade: Rosids
- Order: Myrtales
- Family: Myrtaceae
- Genus: Siphoneugena
- Species: S. crassifolia

Binomial name
- Siphoneugena crassifolia (DC.) Proença & Sobral

Synonyms
- Calycorectes widgrenianus (O.Berg) Nied.; Eugenia crassifolia DC.; Eugenia widgreniana (O.Berg) Kiaersk.; Mitranthes pubescens Burret; Mitranthes widgreniana (O.Berg) Burret; Siphoneugena widgreniana O.Berg

Species of plant

Siphoneugena crassifolia (synonym Siphoneugenia widgreniana) is a species of plant in the family Myrtaceae. It is endemic to Brazil. Under the synonym Siphoneugenia widgreniana, it was considered vulnerable.
