= Phylloserica =

Scientific classification
- Kingdom: Animalia
- Phylum: Arthropoda
- Class: Insecta
- Order: Coleoptera
- Suborder: Polyphaga
- Infraorder: Scarabaeiformia
- Family: Scarabaeidae
- Subfamily: Sericinae
- Tribe: Sericini
- Genus: Phylloserica; Brenske, 1899

Genus of leaf beetles

Phylloserica is a genus of beetles belonging to the family Scarabaeidae.

== Species ==
- Phylloserica amberensis Moser, 1920
- Phylloserica brenskei (Brancsik, 1892)
- Phylloserica candezei Brenske, 1900
- Phylloserica gracilis Moser, 1915
- Phylloserica macrophylla Moser, 1911
- Phylloserica unicolor (Snellen Van Vollenhoven, 1877)
