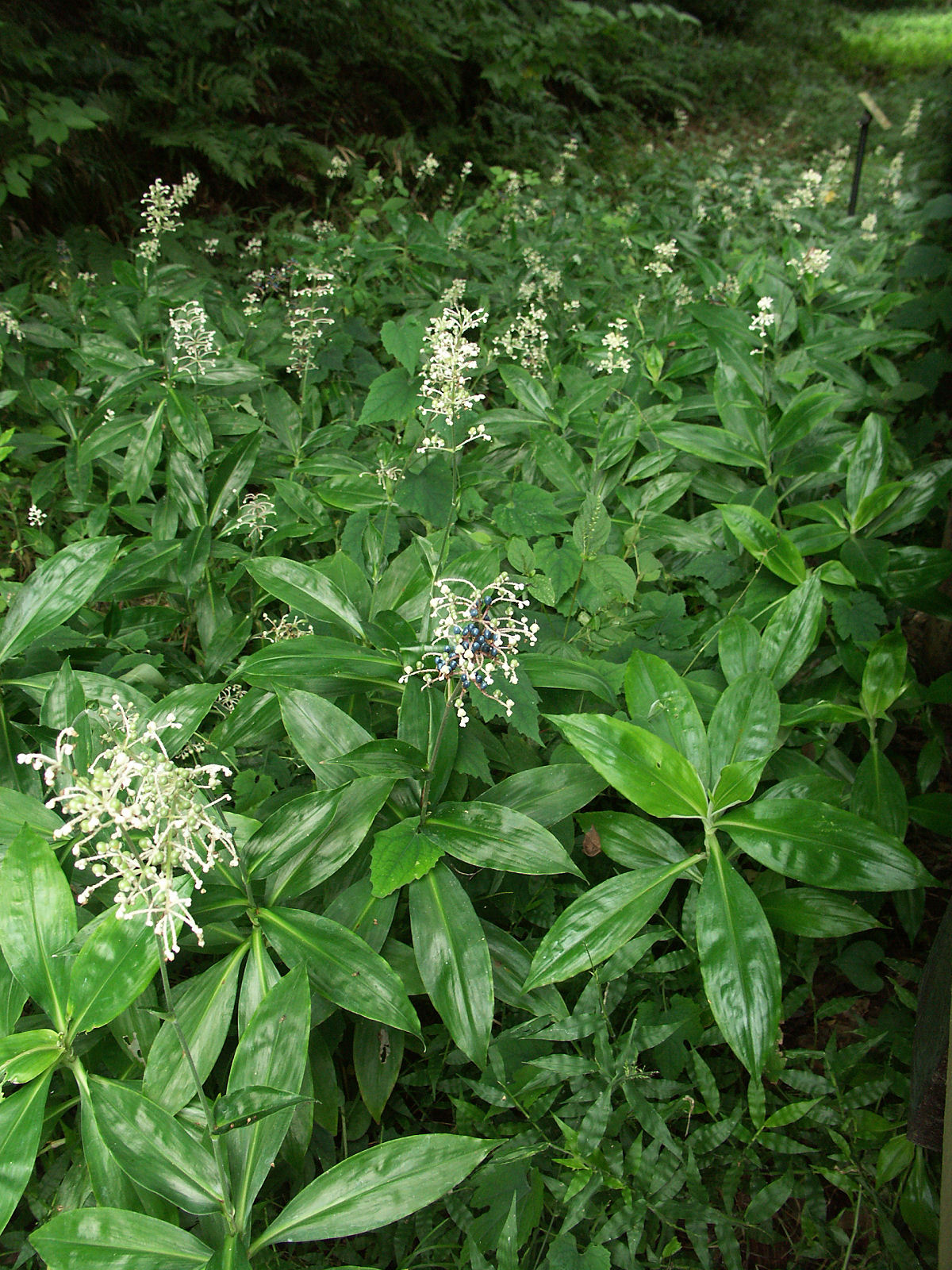

Scientific classification
- Kingdom: Plantae
- Clade: Tracheophytes
- Clade: Angiosperms
- Clade: Monocots
- Clade: Commelinids
- Order: Commelinales
- Family: Commelinaceae
- Genus: Pollia
- Species: P. japonica

Binomial name
- Pollia japonica Thunb.

= Pollia japonica =

Species of plant

Pollia japonica, known as East Asian pollia in English, yabumyoga (ヤブミョウガ) in Japanese, and dùruò (杜若) in Chinese, is a perennial flowering plant native to East Asia. Its habitat is forests of 0–1200 m of altitude. It is native in Anhui, Fujian, Guangdong, Guangxi, Guizhou, Hubei, Hunan, Jiangxi, and Sichuan Provinces of China. It is also found in Taiwan, Japan, and Korea.
