= Phylloserica candezei =

Scientific classification
- Kingdom: Animalia
- Phylum: Arthropoda
- Class: Insecta
- Order: Coleoptera
- Suborder: Polyphaga
- Infraorder: Scarabaeiformia
- Family: Scarabaeidae
- Genus: Phylloserica
- Species: P. candezei

Binomial name
- Phylloserica candezei Brenske, 1900

Species of beetle

Phylloserica candezei is a species of beetle of the family Scarabaeidae. It is found in Madagascar.

== Description ==
Adults reach a length of about 7 mm. They have an oblong-ovate, light reddish-brown body. The pronotum is very finely punctate. The secondary ribs are present on the weakly convex elytra and the setae next to the ribs are fine, and on the lateral margin rib they are densely packed.
