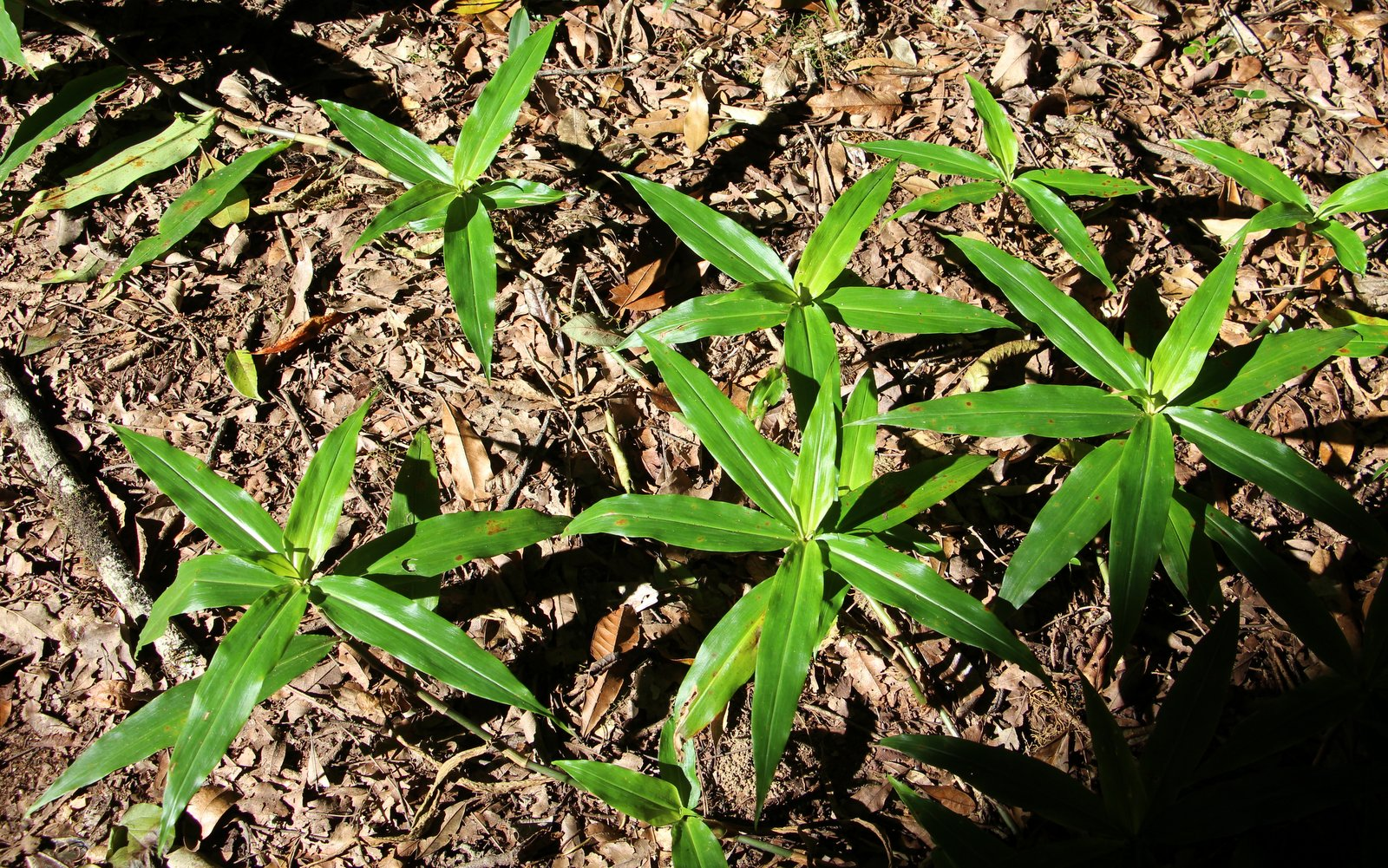
- Killiekrankie Mountain, New England National Park, Australia
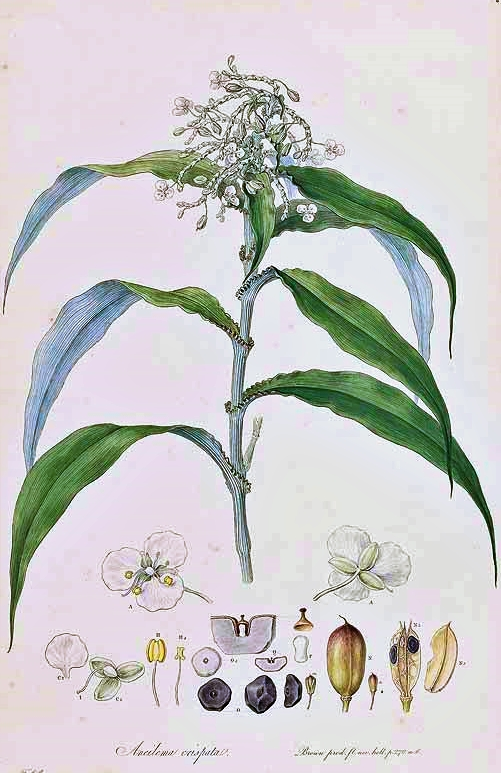
- Illustration by Ferdinand Bauer

Scientific classification
- Kingdom: Plantae
- Clade: Tracheophytes
- Clade: Angiosperms
- Clade: Monocots
- Clade: Commelinids
- Order: Commelinales
- Family: Commelinaceae
- Genus: Pollia
- Species: P. crispata

Binomial name
- Pollia crispata (R.Br.) Benth.

Synonyms
- Aneilema crispatum R.Br.

= Pollia crispata =

Species of plant

Pollia crispata is a perennial herb found in rainforest or rainforest margins in eastern Australia. The specific epithet crispata is derived from Latin, meaning "wavy". Found from near Nowra in New South Wales to tropical Queensland.

It is one of the many plants first described by Robert Brown with the type known as "(J.) v.v." Published in his Prodromus Florae Novae Hollandiae et Insulae Van Diemen in 1810, the plant was later moved by the systematic botanist George Bentham into the genus Pollia.
