= Siphoneugena occidentalis =

Conservation status
- Vulnerable (IUCN 2.3)

Scientific classification
- Kingdom: Plantae
- Clade: Tracheophytes
- Clade: Angiosperms
- Clade: Eudicots
- Clade: Rosids
- Order: Myrtales
- Family: Myrtaceae
- Genus: Siphoneugena
- Species: S. occidentalis

Binomial name
- Siphoneugena occidentalis D.Legrand

Synonyms
- Siphoneugena parviflora Kausel

Species of flowering plant

Siphoneugena occidentalis is a species of flowering plant in the family Myrtaceae. It is a tree native to northwestern Argentina (Salta Province), southern Bolivia, Paraguay, and west-central Brazil. In Argentina and Bolivia it grows in Piedmont forest on the eastern slope of the Andes. It is threatened by habitat loss.
