= The Manse, Mount Druitt =

The Manse
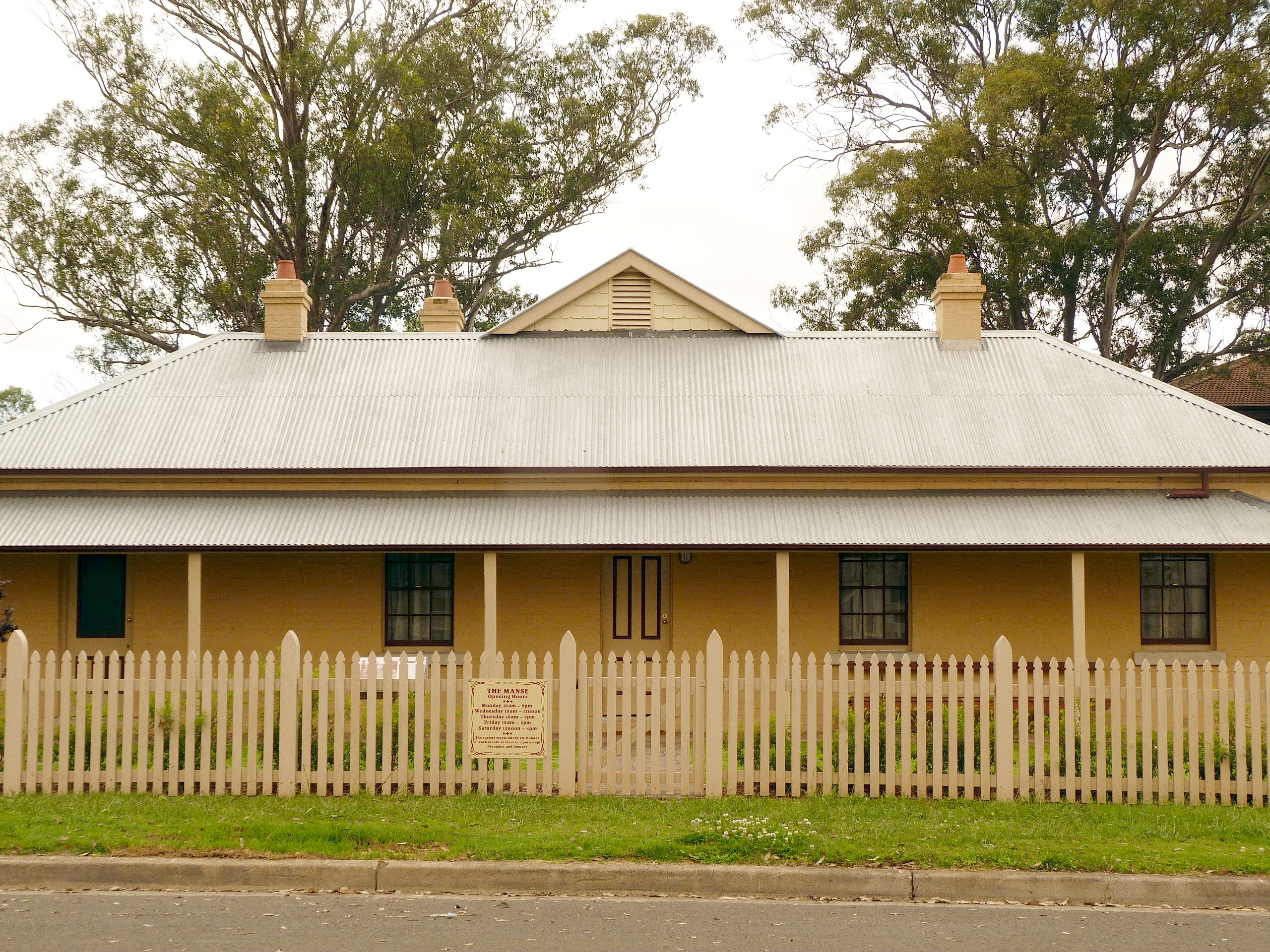
- The Manse, 2010

- Location within Sydney
- 33°46′12″S 150°48′49″E
- Location: 23 The Avenue, Mount Druitt, Sydney, New South Wales, Australia

History
- Built: c. 1880s

Site notes
- Owner: Blacktown City Council

New South Wales Heritage Register
- Official name: The Manse; Methodist Manse
- Type: State heritage (built)
- Designated: 2 April 1999
- Reference no.: 206
- Type: Presbytery/Rectory/ Vicarage/Manse
- Category: Religion
- Builders: probably by local notable, John Harris

The Manse is a heritage-listed former residence and now community museum at 23 The Avenue, Mount Druitt, Sydney, New South Wales, Australia. It was probably built by local notable, John Harris. It is also known as Methodist Manse. The property is owned by Blacktown City Council. It was added to the New South Wales State Heritage Register on 2 April 1999.

== History ==
The Mount Druitt area played an important part in the early colonial history of New South Wales. It was one of three areas along with Prospect and Colyton, clustered some 45 kilometres (28 mi) west of the Sydney Cove settlement at Port Jackson.

In 1821 Governor Macquarie granted 1000 acres to Major George Druitt (1775–1842), officer of the 48th Regiment, magistrate and Chief Engineer of roads and buildings during Macquarie's term (1810–21). Druitt became a notable figure in the life of the colony. Macquarie appointed him colonial engineer and inspector of public works, and he supervised construction of many of architect Francis Greenway's buildings.

This original "Mount Druitt" estate was bounded on the south by the Great Western Road (now Great Western Highway) commencing at Ropes Creek Bridge and on the east by a line bearing west to Ropes Creek and bounded in the west by the creek itself.

The land on which the Manse sits today was originally part of land granted to Major Druitt in November 1837. Between 1837 and 1881 the land had repeated changes of ownership.

In March 1881, a Strathfield real estate agent, George Kennedy King purchased two large sections of land that had formed part of the original Mt Druitt estate. These two sections comprised a total area of 310 acres and were created via Lees' 1855 subdivision. Upon purchase of the land, King engaged Sydney-based surveyors, Dawson and Stephen, to facilitate two further large subdivisions of the land. The first subdivision of approximately 200 acres was located south of the railway line and was advertised as the "Garfield subdivision" - this subdivision included the land upon which The Manse was later built.

No definitive construction date is known for The Manse, but it appears to have been constructed c. late 1880s following subdivision of the Druitt Estate. It comprises a single storey brick residence in rectangular plan, distinctly Victorian Georgian in architectural style, with hipped roof and skillion verandah on two sides. It was probably built by local notable, John Harris of Shanes Park. The property was owned and occupied by the Kennedy family until c. 1895 when they donated it to the Presbyterian Church.

The Kennedys were devout Presbyterians and when a new church was being built there was nowhere for the Minister to live. The Kennedys donated the house to the Church and it became a manse.

From 1896 onwards The Manse continued as the Presbyterian minister's residence housing a succession of ministers of the Mount Druitt congregation. Reverend George Milne occupying The Manse from about 1913 until 1930

After a split in the Church, Blacktown City Council bought the house in 2001 and rented it out as a residence. During this period a fireplace, an organ and other items disappeared from the building. From 2007 to 2008 Council have undertaken conservation and restoration works to the property to prepare it for a community use.

The Manse today houses the Mount Druitt Historical Society.

A very fine and largely intact early country style dwelling, it is the oldest remaining building in Mount Druitt.

== Description ==
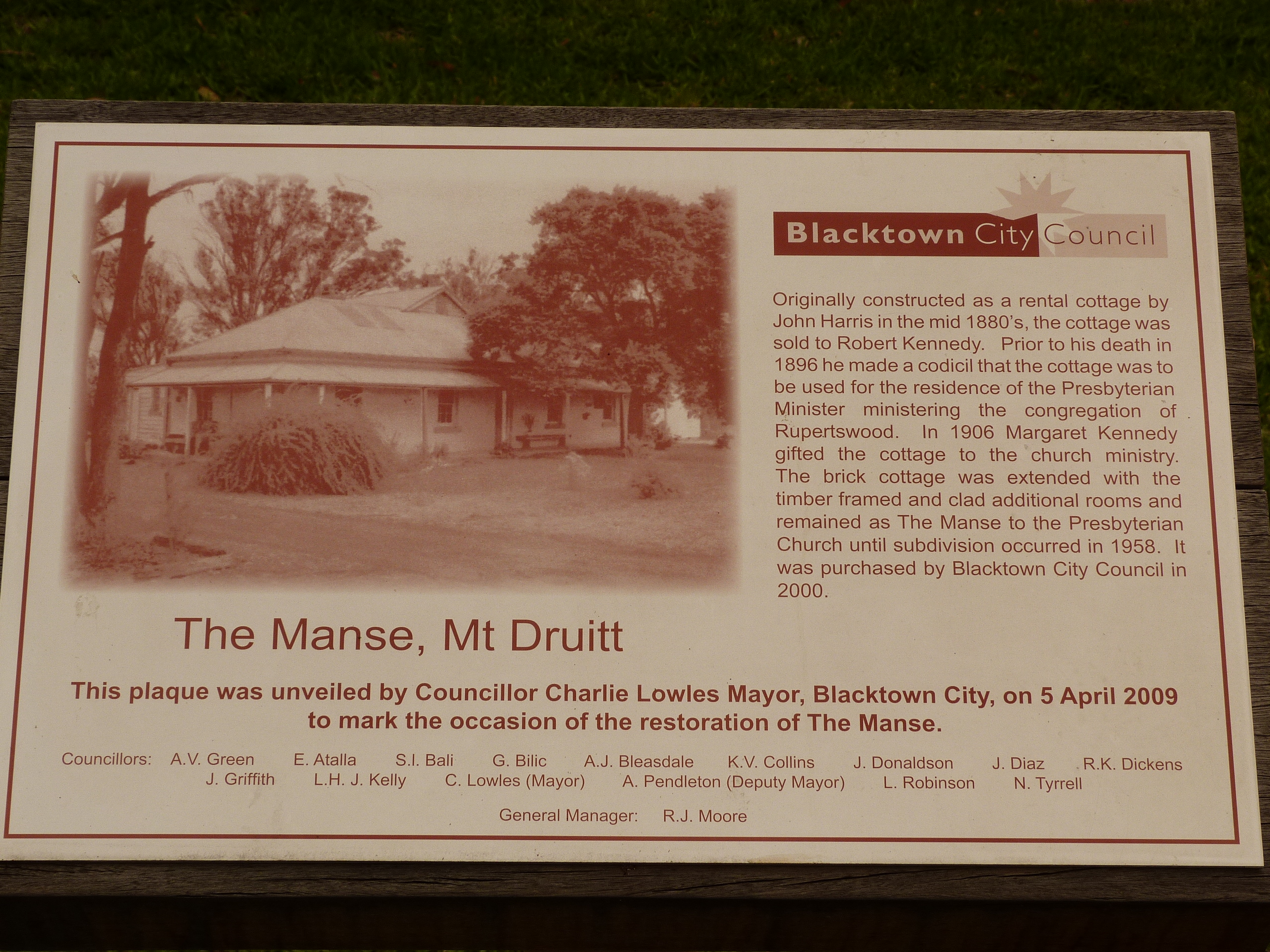
Information board, 2010

=== The Manse ===
A Victorian Georgian single storey brick house in rectangular plan with hipped roof and separately roofed verandah on two sides. The centrally placed small gable roof ventilator and replacement of the verandah floor are more recent modifications.

=== The Manse Reserve ===
The Reserve is segregated into a number of interconnected visual units by nature of its layout and facilities. The most visible part is located at the corner of The Avenue and Mount Druitt Road. This is largely undeveloped with a large stand of remnant Eucalyptus woodland with an understorey of long grasses. To the frontage along The Avenue an asphalt car park is located at the corner with koppers log fencing.

An open grass area and informal gravel car park connects this area to The Manse. The heritage building is located towards the eastern end of the site, with remnant trees and open grass. The building although forming a strong character in the Reserve is in poor condition and is fenced with unattractive chain link fencing. The Manse is currently undergoing renovation & repairs.

The adjoining land uses include the "Meals on Wheels" facility and areas of undeveloped land. The area to the south and east of The Manse consists of mown paddock grass and a scattered stand of endemic Eucalyptus woodland and is partially broken up by post and wire farm fencing with a dense clump of privet to the south western corner.

=== Reserve's remnant Cumberland Plain Woodland ===
Although no flora survey was prepared as part of the plan of management process, the remnant native trees area consistent with the vegetation community found at the nearby Dr. Charles McKay Reserve at Beames Avenue, Mount Druitt which is dominated by grey box (Eucalyptus punctata) and narrow-leafed ironbark (E.crebra) Woodland.

Although little endemic understorey exists on site; the remnant native trees are consistent with this community and may have potential for regeneration. The typical structure of the community would be scattered woodland to open forest and the understorey characterised by the shrubs blackthorn (Bursaria spinosa), spider flower (Grevillea juniperina), ham and eggs (Pultenaea microphylla) and the pea flower, Dillwynia juniperina. Common grasses would include kangaroo grass (Themeda australis), Danthonia sp. and Microlaena stipoides.

=== Garden planting ===
Little heritage planting appears to remain in association with The Manse. These cultural plantings are not of significance and include privet (Ligustrum sp.), oleander (Nerium oleander cv.) and cypress pine (Callitris sp.).

There have been no improvements for open space or recreational usage on the site other than the car park and some fencing. The Reserve is to all intents undeveloped for recreational or community use. The car park and associated fencing on the corner of Mount Druitt Road & The Avenue are partially within the Reserve boundaries. The asphalt surface is uneven and in poor repair. There is an unformed informal car park adjacent to the Manse.

=== Fencing ===
There are a number of differing fences within the Reserve, including boundary fencing, post & rail fencing, security fencing around The Manse and sections of remnant post and wire farm fencing to the rear of The Manse, reminiscent of the sites earlier semi-rural land use. The majority of these fences within the Reserve are in poor repair.

== Heritage listing ==
The Manse was listed on the New South Wales State Heritage Register on 2 April 1999.
