= Phylloserica amberensis =

Scientific classification
- Kingdom: Animalia
- Phylum: Arthropoda
- Clade: Pancrustacea
- Class: Insecta
- Order: Coleoptera
- Suborder: Polyphaga
- Infraorder: Scarabaeiformia
- Family: Scarabaeidae
- Genus: Phylloserica
- Species: P. amberensis

Binomial name
- Phylloserica amberensis Moser, 1920

Species of beetle

Phylloserica amberensis is a species of beetle of the family Scarabaeidae. It is found in Madagascar.

== Description ==
Adults reach a length of about 6.5 mm. They are reddish-yellow. The frons is sparsely punctate. The pronotum is medium densely punctate.
