= Phylloserica gracilis =

Scientific classification
- Kingdom: Animalia
- Phylum: Arthropoda
- Clade: Pancrustacea
- Class: Insecta
- Order: Coleoptera
- Suborder: Polyphaga
- Infraorder: Scarabaeiformia
- Family: Scarabaeidae
- Genus: Phylloserica
- Species: P. gracilis

Binomial name
- Phylloserica gracilis Moser, 1915

Species of beetle

Phylloserica gracilis is a species of beetle of the family Scarabaeidae. It is found in Madagascar.

== Description ==
Adults reach a length of about 7 mm. The reddish-yellow, elongate, narrow body. The frons is widely punctured and the antennae are yellowish-brown. The pronotum is finely and moderately densely punctate, the base is finely margined, the anterior margin is slightly arched in the middle and, like the lateral margins, sparsely covered with setae. The elytra are fairly densely punctate, with narrow, smooth ribs that are more or less clearly visible.
