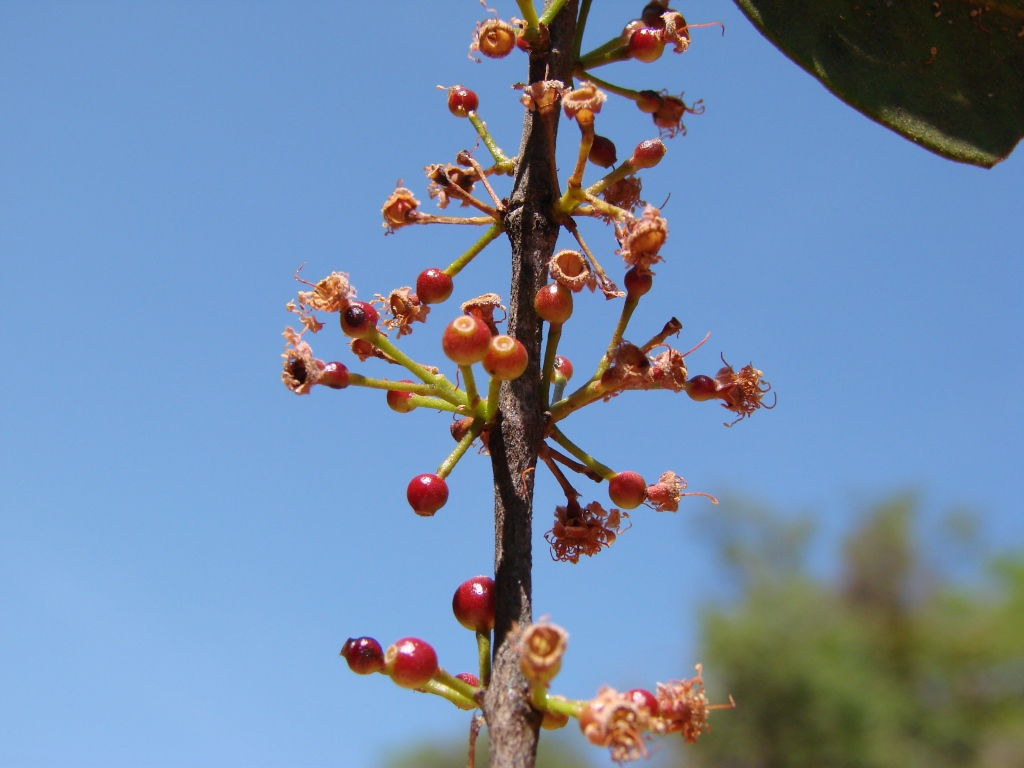
- Siphoneugena densiflora fruits forming

Scientific classification
- Kingdom: Plantae
- Clade: Tracheophytes
- Clade: Angiosperms
- Clade: Eudicots
- Clade: Rosids
- Order: Myrtales
- Family: Myrtaceae
- Subfamily: Myrtoideae
- Tribe: Myrteae
- Genus: Siphoneugena; O.Berg

Synonyms
- Calycorectes subgen. Siphoneugenia (O.Berg) Nied.; Eugenia subgen. Siphoneugena (O.Berg) Kiaersk.; Paramitranthes Burret

= Siphoneugena =

Genus of flowering plants in the myrtle family

Siphoneugena is a genus of the botanical family Myrtaceae, first described as a genus in 1856. It is native to Central and South America as well as the West Indies.

== Species ==
15 species are accepted.

- Siphoneugena carolyniae T.Fern. & J.M.A.Braga – Rio de Janeiro
- Siphoneugena crassifolia (DC.) Proença & Sobral – Minas Gerais, Paraná
- Siphoneugena delicata Sobral & Proença – Espírito Santo
- Siphoneugena densiflora O.Berg – Brazil
- Siphoneugena dussii (Krug & Urb.) Proença – Costa Rica, Panama, Puerto Rico, Lesser Antilles, Venezuela, Suriname, Guyana, Ecuador, Peru, Brazil
- Siphoneugena glabrata Loza & P.Jørg. – Bolivia
- Siphoneugena guilfoyleiana Proença – São Paulo
- Siphoneugena itatiaiensis D.K.D.Caldas & Stadnik – Rio de Janeiro
- Siphoneugena kiaerskoviana (Burret) Kausel – SE Brazil
- Siphoneugena kuhlmannii Mattos – eastern Brazil
- Siphoneugena martinellii (G.M.Barroso & Peixoto) Stadnik & Sobral – Rio de Janeiro
- Siphoneugena minima Loza & A.Fuentes – La Paz
- Siphoneugena occhionii (D.Legrand) Stadnik & Proença – Rio de Janeiro
- Siphoneugena occidentalis D.Legrand – WC Brazil, S Bolivia, Paraguay, Salta
- Siphoneugena reitzii D.Legrand – S + SE Brazil
