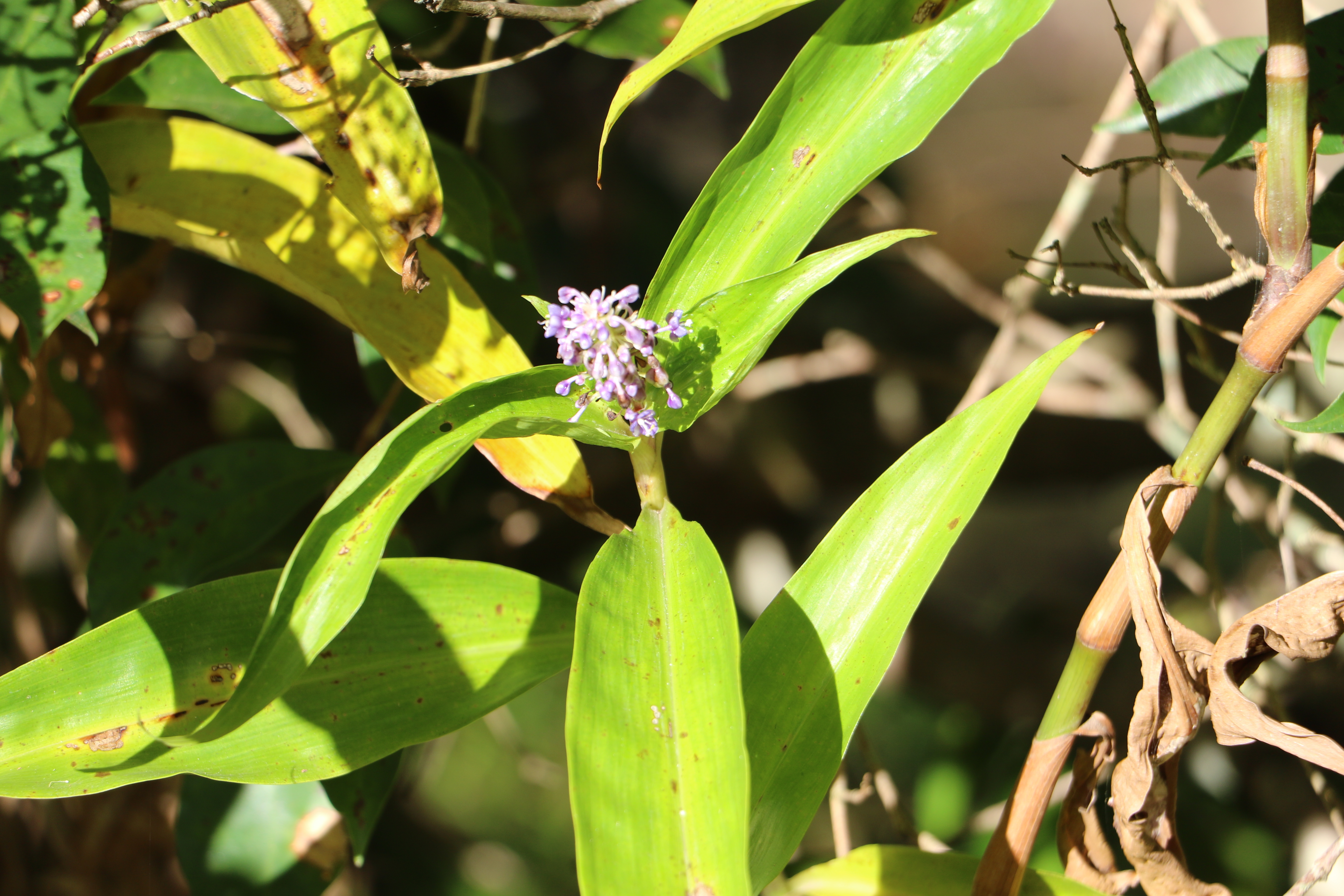

Scientific classification
- Kingdom: Plantae
- Clade: Tracheophytes
- Clade: Angiosperms
- Clade: Monocots
- Clade: Commelinids
- Order: Commelinales
- Family: Commelinaceae
- Genus: Pollia
- Species: P. macrophylla

Binomial name
- Pollia macrophylla (R.Br.) Benth.

Synonyms
- Aneilema macrophyllum R.Br.

= Pollia macrophylla =

Species of herb

Pollia macrophylla is a perennial herb found in rainforest in eastern Australia.
