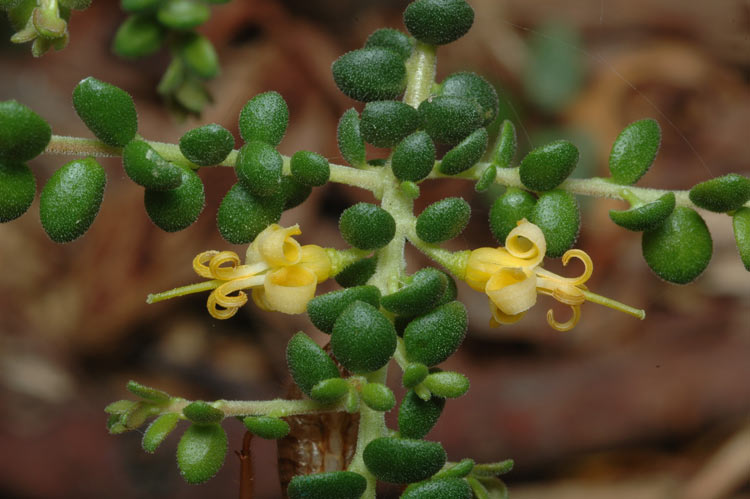
- In the Australian National Botanic Gardens

Scientific classification
- Kingdom: Plantae
- Clade: Tracheophytes
- Clade: Angiosperms
- Clade: Eudicots
- Order: Proteales
- Family: Proteaceae
- Genus: Persoonia
- Species: P. microphylla

Binomial name
- Persoonia microphylla R.Br.

Synonyms
- Persoonia oxycoccoides var. microphylla (R.Br.) Domin

= Persoonia microphylla =

Species of shrub

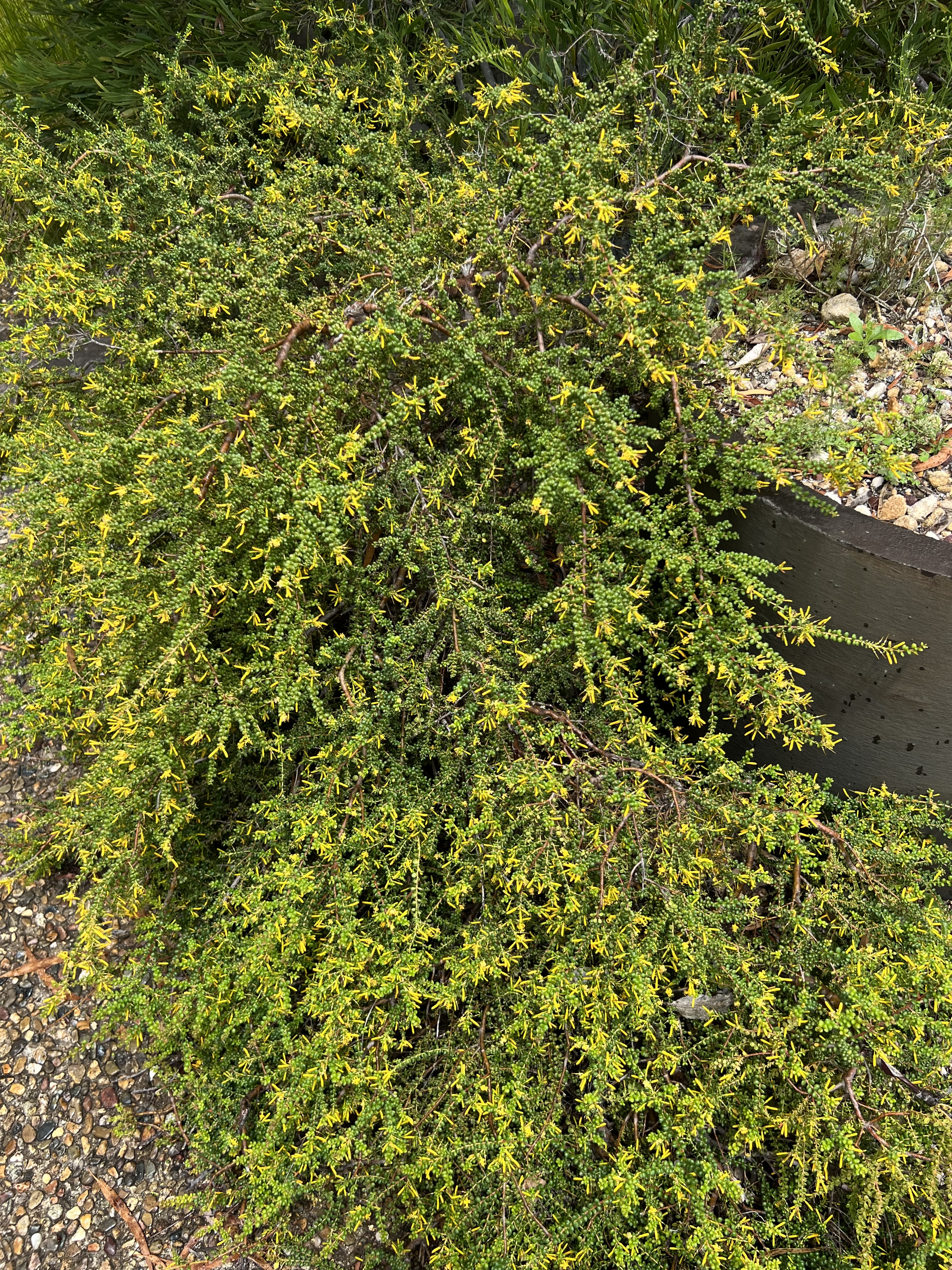
Habit

Persoonia microphylla is a species of flowering plant in the family Proteaceae and is endemic to New South Wales. It is an erect to prostrate shrub with elliptic to egg-shaped leaves and yellow flowers in groups of up to fourteen on a rachis up to 30 mm (1.2 in) long.

== Description ==
Persoonia microphylla is an erect to prostrate shrub that typically grows to a height of about 2 m (6 ft 7 in) and has smooth bark, its young branchlets covered with whitish or greyish hairs. The leaves are broadly elliptical to broadly egg-shaped, 3–9 mm (0.12–0.35 in) long and 2–5 mm (0.079–0.197 in) wide with the edges turned downwards. The flowers are arranged in groups of up to fourteen along a rachis up to 30 mm (1.2 in) long that grows into a leafy shoot after flowering. Each flower is on a pedicel about 1–3 mm (0.039–0.118 in) long, usually with a leaf at the base. The tepals are yellow, 8–10 mm (0.31–0.39 in) long and hairy on the outside. Flowering occurs from December to February and the fruit is a green drupe with purple stripes.

== Taxonomy ==
Persoonia microphylla was first formally described in 1830 by Robert Brown in the 1830 supplement to his Prodromus from specimens collected in 1823 near Port Jackson. According to Brown, the type collection was made by "D. Cunningham", but in 1991, Peter Weston and Lawrie Johnson nominated the holotype, collected by Allan Cunningham in April 1824, and stored in the British Museum.

== Distribution and habitat ==
This species of Persoonia grows in heath and forest in eastern New South Wales at altitudes between 600 and 1,200 m (2,000 and 3,900 ft), occurring disjunctly near Taralga and in river catchments of the Budawang Range.
