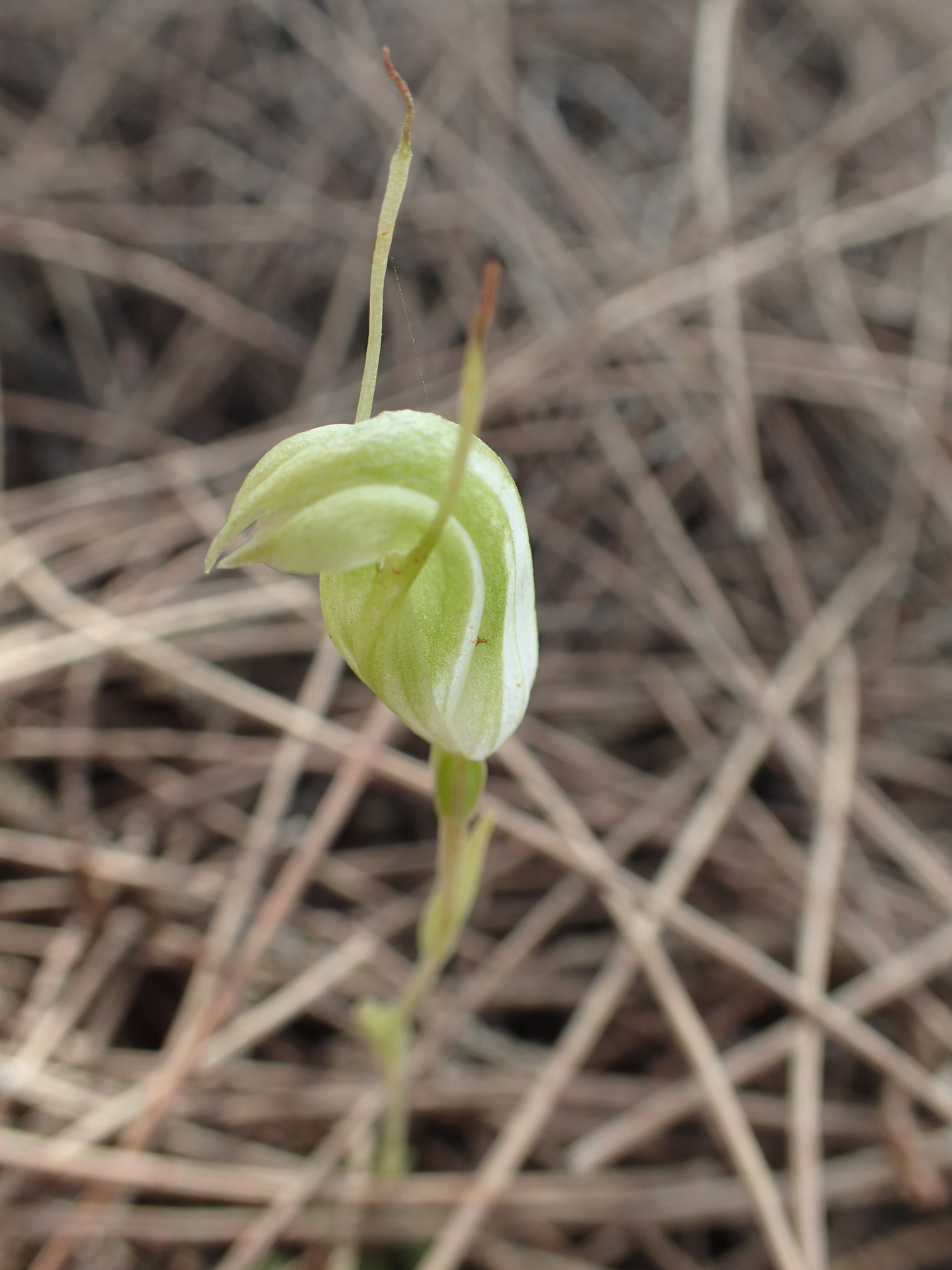
- Pterostylis microphylla at the type location near Gull Rock

Scientific classification
- Kingdom: Plantae
- Clade: Tracheophytes
- Clade: Angiosperms
- Clade: Monocots
- Order: Asparagales
- Family: Orchidaceae
- Subfamily: Orchidoideae
- Tribe: Cranichideae
- Genus: Pterostylis
- Species: P. microphylla

Binomial name
- Pterostylis microphylla D.L.Jones & C.J.French

Synonyms
- Diplodium microphyllum (D.L.Jones & C.J.French) D.L.Jones & M.A.Clem.

= Pterostylis microphylla =

Small rosette snail orchid

Species of orchid

Pterostylis microphylla, commonly known as the small rosette snail orchid, is a species of orchid endemic to the south-west of Western Australia. As with similar greenhoods, the flowering plants differ from those which are not flowering. The non-flowering plants have a rosette of leaves flat on the ground but the flowering plants have a single flower with leaves on the flowering spike. In this species, the flower is white and green with narrow, erect lateral sepals and a small labellum.

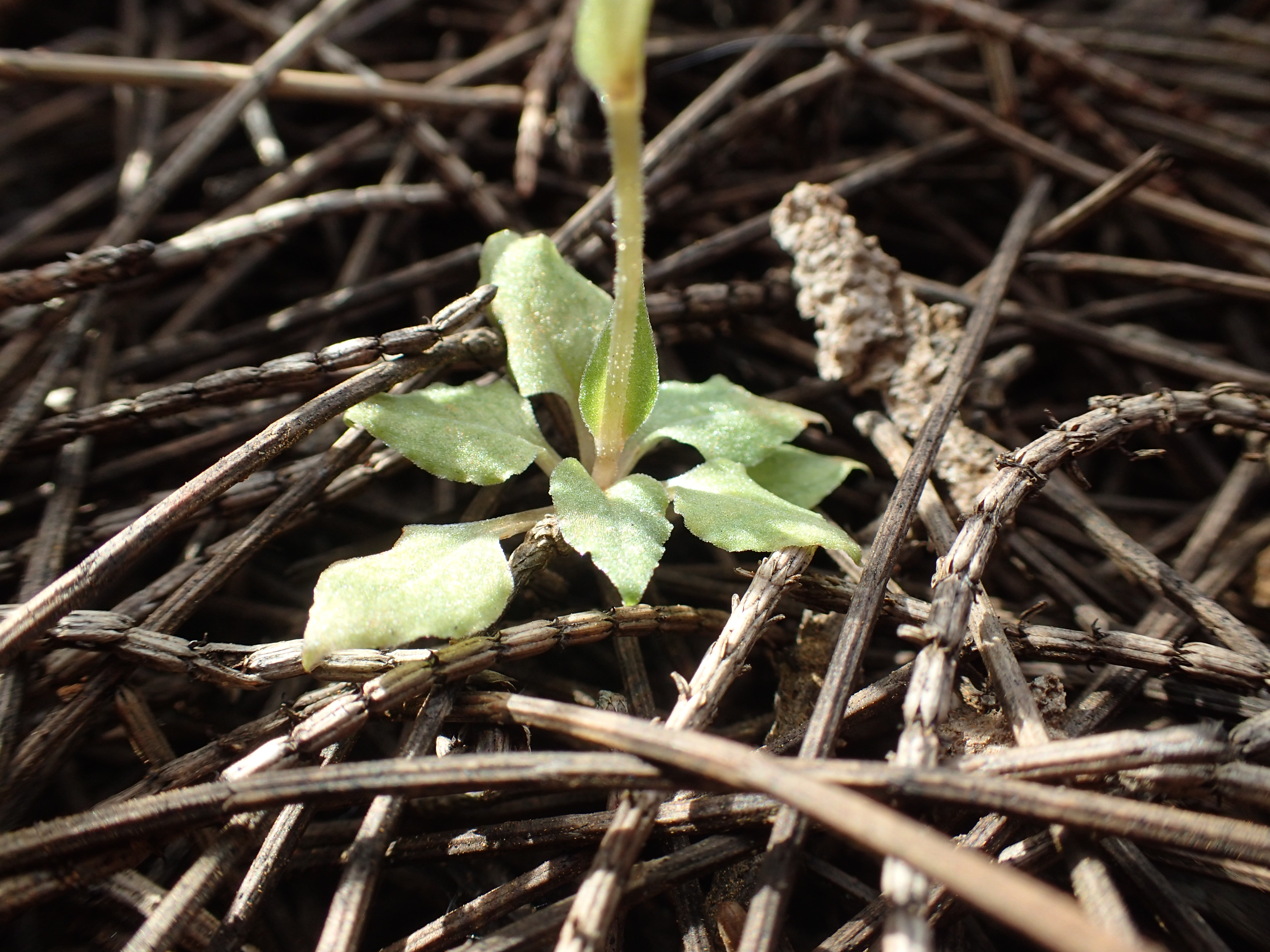
leaf rosette

== Description ==
Pterostylis microphylla is a terrestrial, perennial, deciduous, herb with an underground tuber and when not flowering, a rosette of small leaves. The rosette is 10–20 mm (0.4–0.8 in) in diameter. Flowering plants have a single green and white flower 10–15 mm (0.4–0.6 in) long and 4–6 mm (0.16–0.24 in) wide on a flowering stem 60–150 mm (2–6 in) high. There are two or three stem leaves 6–10 mm (0.2–0.4 in) long and 2–4 mm (0.08–0.2 in) wide on the flowering stem. The dorsal sepal and petals are fused, forming a hood or "galea" over the column and the dorsal sepal has a short point. The lateral sepals are held closely against the galea, 10–20 mm (0.4–0.8 in) long and have thin, erect tips. The labellum is small and not visible from outside the flower. Flowering occurs from August to October.

== Taxonomy and naming ==
Pterostylis microphylla was first formally described in 2014 by David Jones and Christopher French from a specimen collected near Gull Rock Road east of Albany and the description was published in Australian Orchid Review. The specific epithet (microphylla) is derived from the Ancient Greek words mikros meaning "small" or "little" and phyllon meaning "leaf".

== Distribution and habitat ==
The small rosette snail orchid grows under dense shrubs in swampy places between Augusta and Albany in the Jarrah Forest and Warren biogeographic regions.

== Conservation ==
Pterostylis microphylla is listed as "not threatened" by the Government of Western Australia Department of Parks and Wildlife.
