= Phylloserica unicolor =

Scientific classification
- Kingdom: Animalia
- Phylum: Arthropoda
- Class: Insecta
- Order: Coleoptera
- Suborder: Polyphaga
- Infraorder: Scarabaeiformia
- Family: Scarabaeidae
- Genus: Phylloserica
- Species: P. unicolor

Binomial name
- Phylloserica unicolor (Snellen Van Vollenhoven, 1877)

Synonyms
- Pleophylla unicolor Snellen Van Vollenhoven, 1877

Species of beetle

Phylloserica unicolor is a species of beetle of the family Scarabaeidae. It is found in Madagascar.

== Description ==
Adults reach a length of about 8 mm. They have an oblong-oval, glossy brownish-red body. The head and thorax are punctate and the antennae are darker. The pronotum is finely edged along the lateral and posterior margins, bordered all around by a row of reddish setae. The elytra are yellowish-reddish-brown, coarsely punctured, with a finely edged margin along the costa and posterior margin, and a fairly wide margin along the suture. There are four faintly raised striae on each elytron, and between these the faint indication of three other striae. The elytra have a few reddish hairs, mainly towards the margin.
