= Phylloserica macrophylla =

Scientific classification
- Kingdom: Animalia
- Phylum: Arthropoda
- Clade: Pancrustacea
- Class: Insecta
- Order: Coleoptera
- Suborder: Polyphaga
- Infraorder: Scarabaeiformia
- Family: Scarabaeidae
- Genus: Phylloserica
- Species: P. macrophylla

Binomial name
- Phylloserica macrophylla Moser, 1911

Species of beetle

Phylloserica macrophylla is a species of beetle of the family Scarabaeidae. It is found in Madagascar.

== Description ==
Adults reach a length of about 6–7 mm. They are brown and shiny. The head is sparsely but weakly punctate. The pronotum is moderately densely punctate. The punctation of the elytra is coarser and denser than on the pronotum. The ribs are barely indicated and the lateral margins are fringed with brown hairs, and there are also some hairs next to them.
