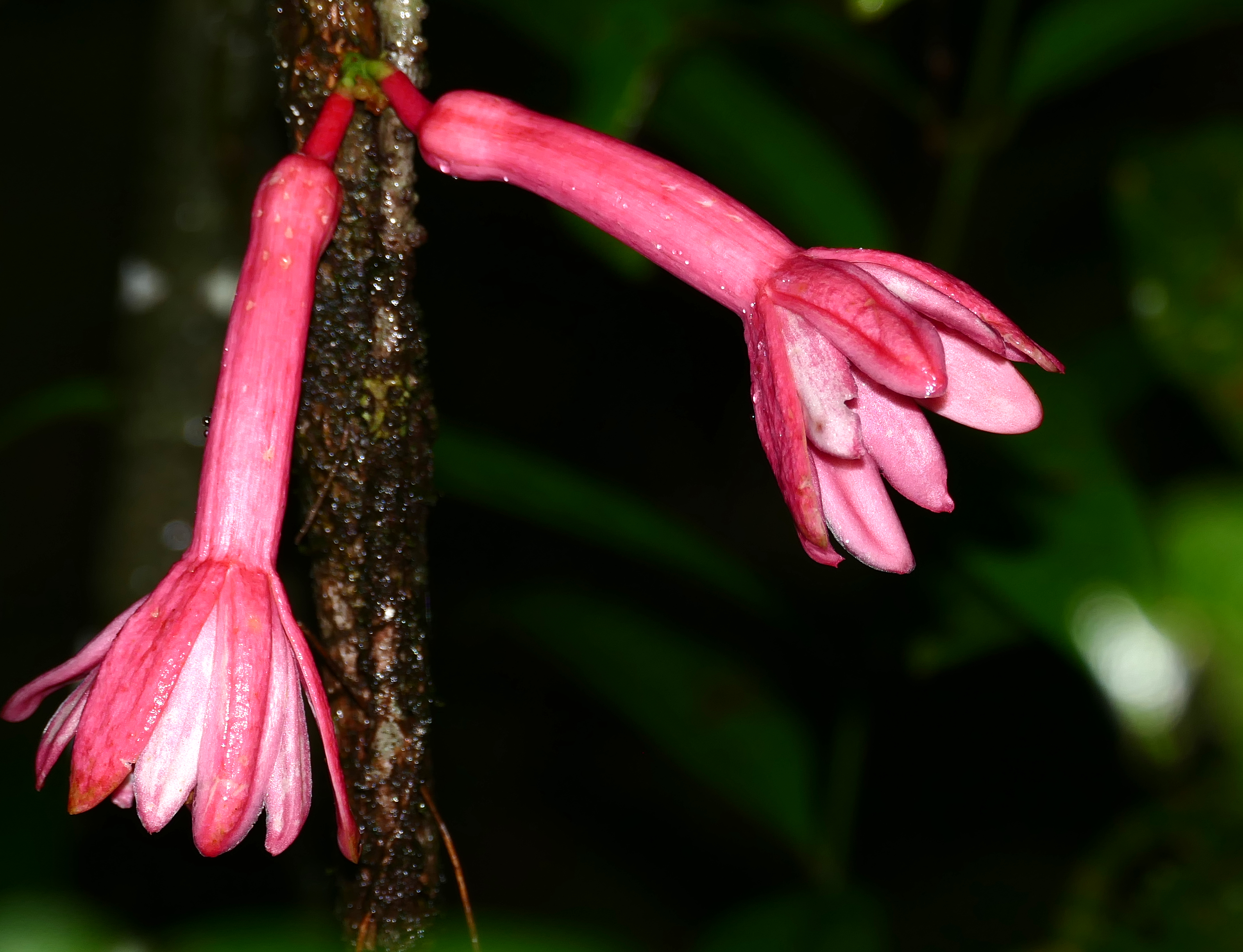

Scientific classification
- Kingdom: Plantae
- Clade: Tracheophytes
- Clade: Angiosperms
- Clade: Eudicots
- Clade: Rosids
- Order: Malpighiales
- Family: Passifloraceae
- Genus: Passiflora
- Species: P. amoena

Binomial name
- Passiflora amoena L.K.Escobar

= Passiflora amoena =

Species of vine

Passiflora amoena is a species of plant in the family Passifloraceae. It is endemic to lowland forests of Guyana and French Guiana, distinguished by its coriaceous pink flowers with a triangle-shaped outer corona.
