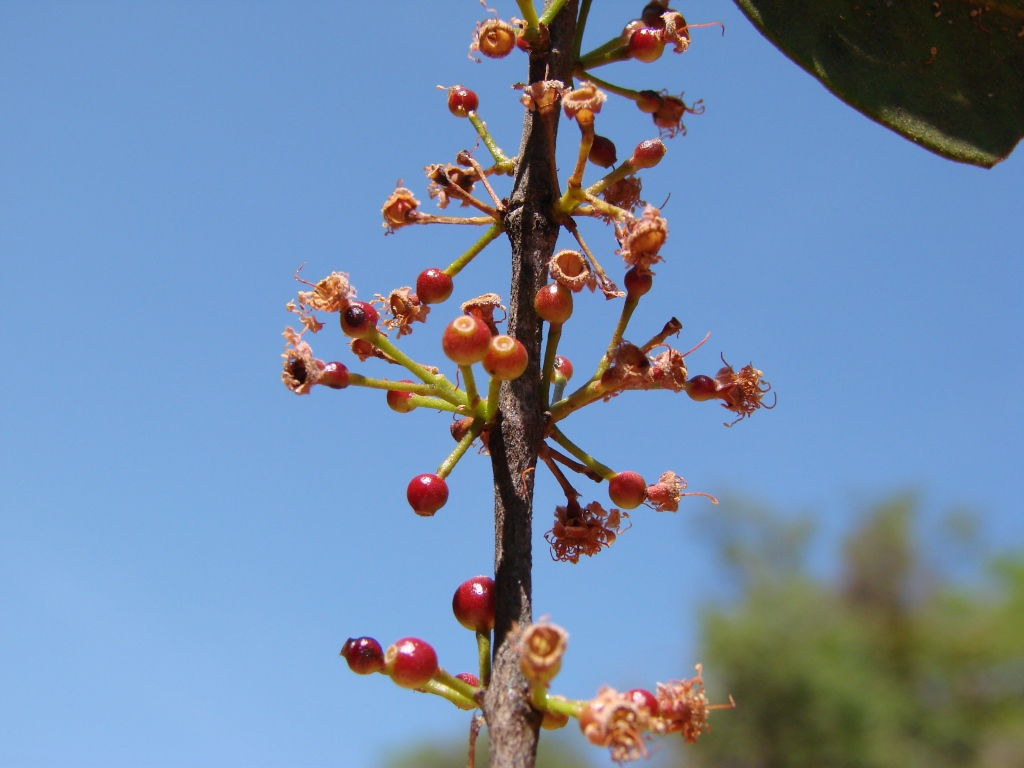
- Siphoneugena densiflora fruits forming

Conservation status
- Least Concern (IUCN 3.1)

Scientific classification
- Kingdom: Plantae
- Clade: Tracheophytes
- Clade: Angiosperms
- Clade: Eudicots
- Clade: Rosids
- Order: Myrtales
- Family: Myrtaceae
- Genus: Siphoneugena
- Species: S. densiflora

Binomial name
- Siphoneugena densiflora O.Berg

Synonyms
- Calycorectes densiflorus (O.Berg) Nied.; Eugenia chnoosepala Kiaersk.; Eugenia chnoosepala var. chnoosepala; Eugenia chnoosepala var. latifolia Kiaersk.; Eugenia chnoosepala var. regnelliana Kiaersk.; Paramitranthes bracteata Burret; Paramitranthes chnoosepala (Kiaersk.) Burret; Paramitranthes densiflora (O.Berg) Burret; Paramitranthes macrophylla Burret; Paramitranthes regnelliana (Kiaersk.) Burret; Siphoneugena bracteata (Burret) Kausel; Siphoneugena chnoosepala (Kiaersk.) Kausel; Siphoneugena chnoosepala var. macrophylla (Burret) Mattos & N.Silveira; Siphoneugena chnoosepala var. pilosa Mattos & N.Silveira; Siphoneugena densiflora var. densiflora; Siphoneugena macrophylla (Burret) Kausel; Siphoneugena macrophylla var. brasiliae Mattos; Siphoneugena regnelliana (Kiaersk.) Kausel

= Siphoneugena densiflora =

Species of tree in the myrtle family

Siphoneugena densiflora is a species of plant in the family Myrtaceae. It is endemic to Brazil. Typically found as a shrub up to 3 metres (9.8 ft) tall, and more rarely as a tree up to between 12 and 13 metres (39 and 43 ft) tall, this plant produces edible purplish-black fruit that are less than 10 mm (0.39 in) in diameter.
