= Manse, Nevada =

- Ghost town
- Location within the state of Nevada Manse, Nevada (the United States)
- Coordinates: 36°09′17″N 115°54′08″W
- Country: United States
- State: Nevada
- County: Nye
- Elevation: 2,779 ft (847 m)
- Time zone: UTC-8 (Pacific (PST))
  - Summer (DST): UTC-7 (PDT)
- GNIS feature ID: 851448

Manse is a ghost town in Nye County, in the U.S. state of Nevada. The GNIS classifies it as a populated place.

== History ==
Manse began as a ranch that was the only place to stop for prospectors travelling west from Las Vegas. A post office was established at Manse in 1891, serving all of Pahrump Valley. Later in the 1890s, the ranch had incorporated a large house, storerooms, corrals, and barns. Stagecoaches from Ivanpah, California and Bullfrog, Nevada would stop for food and water. By 1911, the population around Manse was about 50. Despite the post office closing on March 31, 1914, the ranch still functioned. Stage lines stopped running through the area in the 1910s, leaving Manse only for agricultural purposes. Manse is a name derived from a Native American language meaning "brush". Manse was also known as Manse Ranch, Whites Ranch and Younts Ranch.

Manse Ranch has is still functioning as a dairy farm.
