= Passiflora trochlearis =

Conservation status
- Vulnerable (IUCN 3.1)

Scientific classification
- Kingdom: Plantae
- Clade: Tracheophytes
- Clade: Angiosperms
- Clade: Eudicots
- Clade: Rosids
- Order: Malpighiales
- Family: Passifloraceae
- Genus: Passiflora
- Species: P. trochlearis

Binomial name
- Passiflora trochlearis P.Jørg.

Species of vine

Passiflora trochlearis is a species of plant in the family Passifloraceae. It is endemic to the coastal lowlands of Ecuador. It is named after its purple trochlea which stands out from its light green androgynophore.
