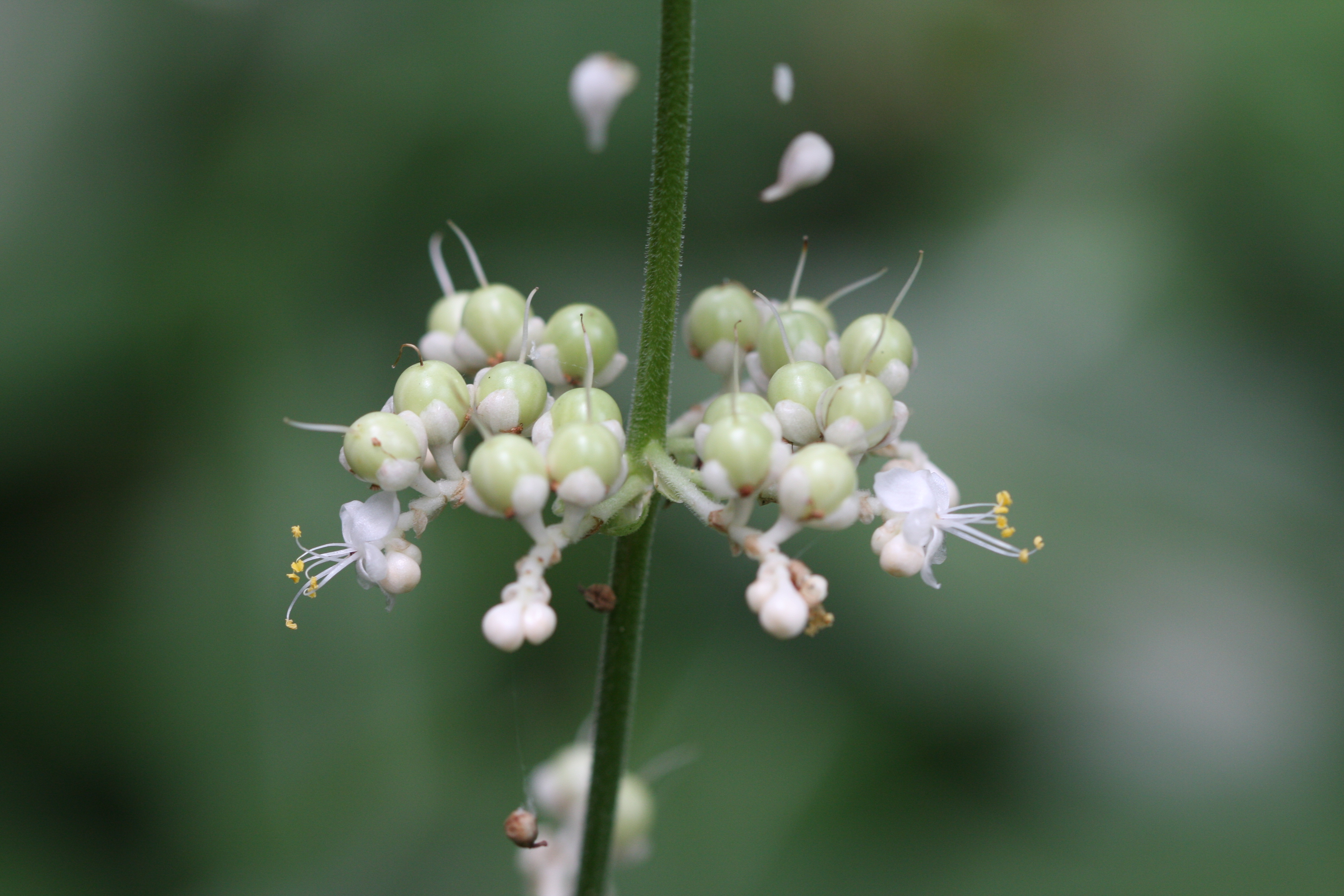
- Flower and young fruit of Pollia japonica

Scientific classification
- Kingdom: Plantae
- Clade: Tracheophytes
- Clade: Angiosperms
- Clade: Monocots
- Clade: Commelinids
- Order: Commelinales
- Family: Commelinaceae
- Subfamily: Commelinoideae
- Tribe: Commelineae
- Genus: Pollia; Thunb. 1781

Synonyms
- Aclisia E.Mey. ex C.Presl; Lamprocarpus Blume

= Pollia (plant) =

Genus of plants

Pollia is a genus of flowering plants in the family Commelinaceae, first described in 1781. It is widespread through the Old World Tropics: Africa, southern Asia, northern Australia, etc. There is also one species endemic to Panama.

Species

- Pollia americana Faden - Panama
- Pollia bracteata K.Schum. - Tanzania
- Pollia condensata C.B.Clarke - much of tropical Africa
- Pollia crispata (R.Br.) Benth. - Queensland, New South Wales
- Pollia gracilis C.B.Clarke - Comoros, Madagascar
- Pollia hasskarlii R.S.Rao - southern China, Himalayas, Indochina, Peninsular Malaysia, Java
- Pollia × horsfieldii C.B.Clarke - Java (P. secundiflora × P. thyrsiflora)
- Pollia japonica Thunb. - China, Japan, Korea, Taiwan, Vietnam
- Pollia macrobracteata D.Y.Hong - Guangxi
- Pollia macrophylla (R.Br.) Benth. - Queensland, New Guinea, Solomon Islands, Philippines, Vietnam
- Pollia mannii C.B.Clarke - from Ivory Coast to Tanzania + Angola
- Pollia miranda (H.Lév.) H.Hara - China, Japan, Ryukyu Islands, Taiwan
- Pollia papuana Ridl. - New Guinea
- Pollia pentasperma C.B.Clarke - Assam
- Pollia sambiranensis H.Perrier - Madagascar
- Pollia secundiflora (Blume) Bakh.f. - China, Taiwan, Ryukyu Islands, Indian Subcontinent, Southeast Asia, New Guinea, New Caledonia
- Pollia subumbellata C.B.Clarke - southern China, Himalayas, Peninsular Malaysia
- Pollia sumatrana Hassk. - Peninsular Malaysia, Borneo, Sumatra, Philippines
- Pollia thyrsiflora (Blume) Steud. - southern China, Assam, Southeast Asia
- Pollia verticillata Hallier f. - New Guinea
- Pollia × zollingeri (Hassk.) C.B.Clarke - Java (P. hasskarlii × P. secundiflora)
