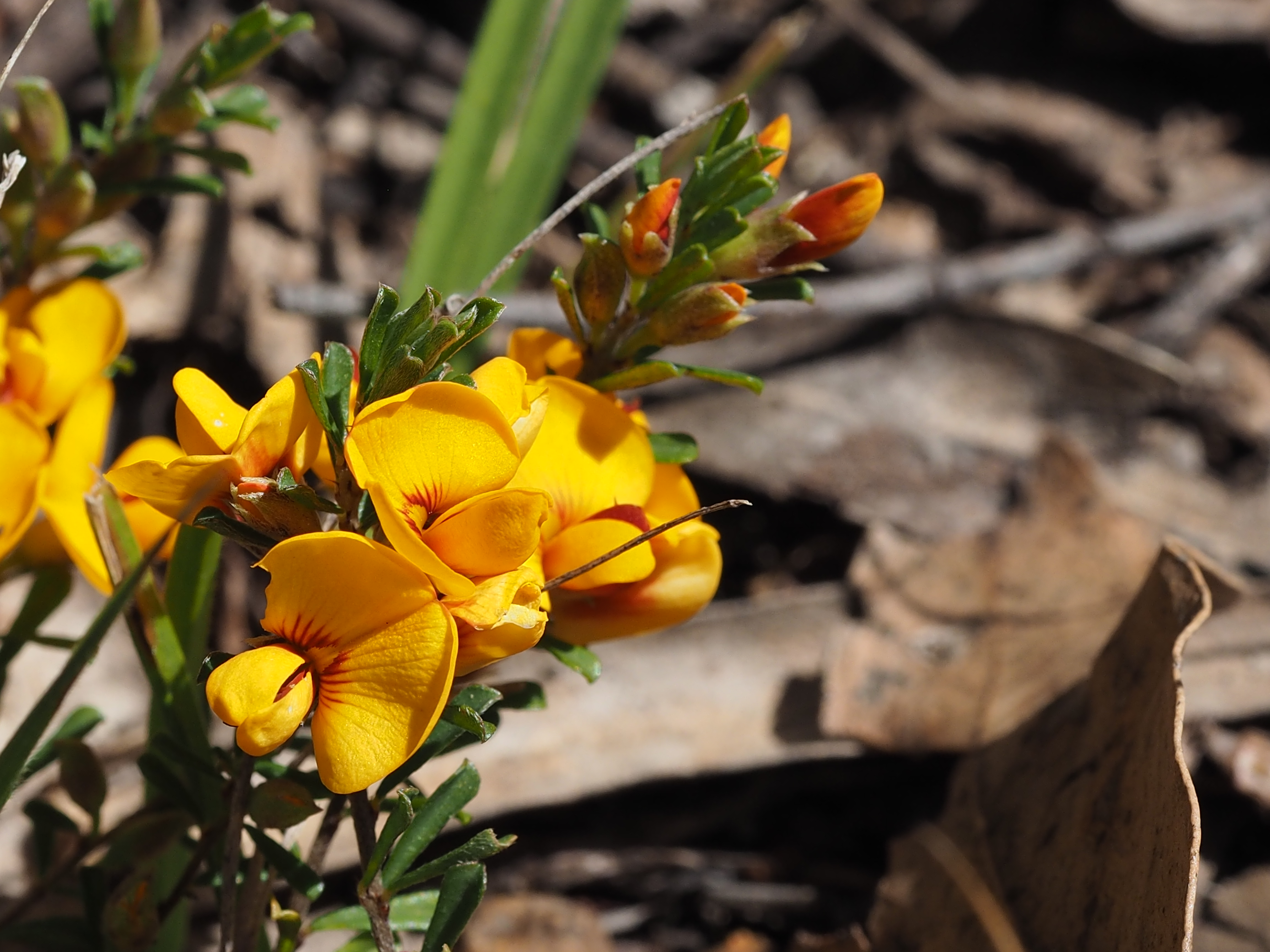
- Near Armidale

Scientific classification
- Kingdom: Plantae
- Clade: Tracheophytes
- Clade: Angiosperms
- Clade: Eudicots
- Clade: Rosids
- Order: Fabales
- Family: Fabaceae
- Subfamily: Faboideae
- Genus: Pultenaea
- Species: P. microphylla

Binomial name
- Pultenaea microphylla Sieber ex DC.

Synonyms
- Pultenaea microphylla Sieber ex DC. var. microphylla; Pultenaea stenophylla A.Cunn. ex G.Don; Pultenaea uncinata A.Cunn. ex Benth.

= Pultenaea microphylla =

Species of flowering plant

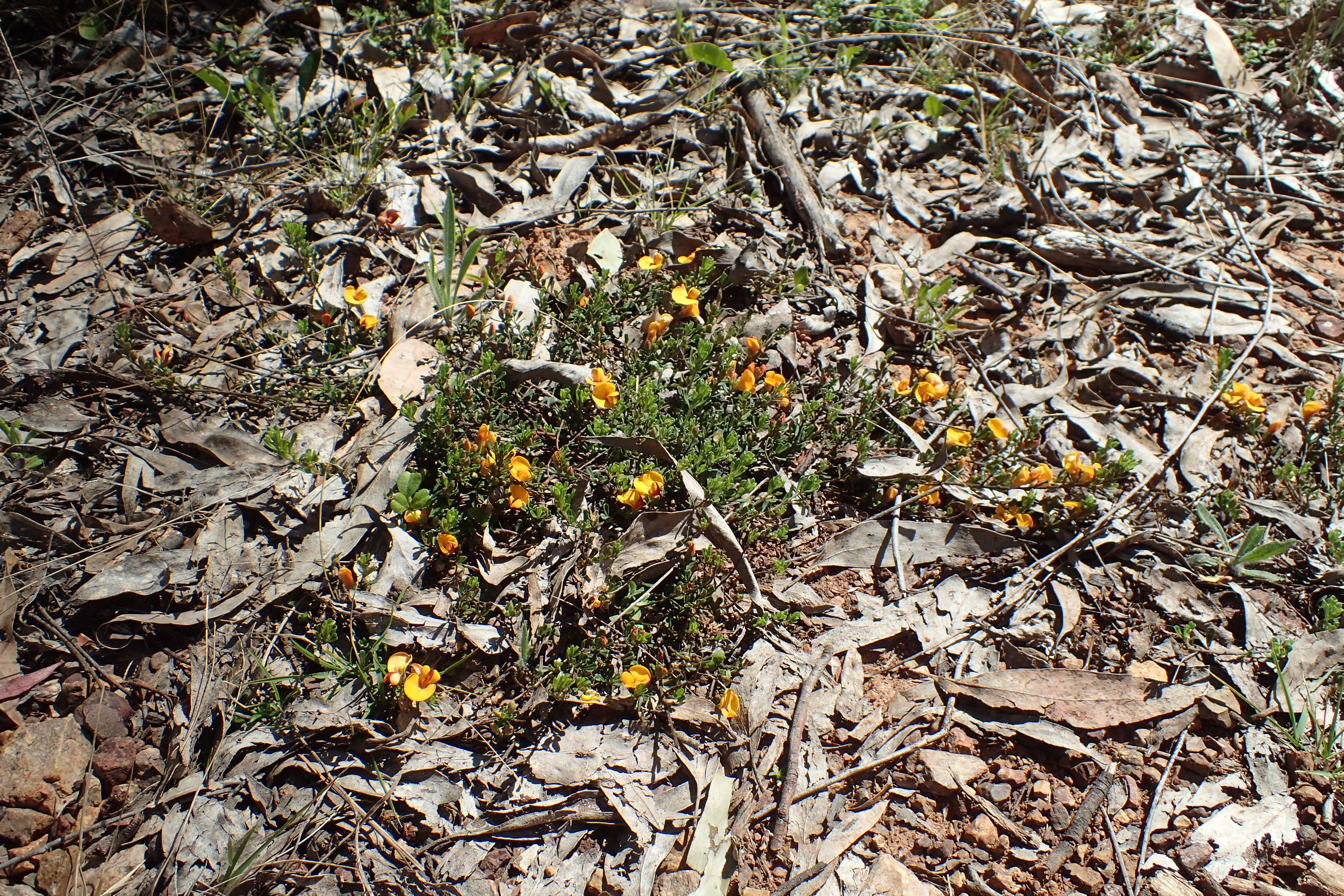
Habit (prostrate form)

Pultenaea microphylla is a species of flowering plant in the family Fabaceae and is endemic to eastern Australia. It is an erect to prostrate shrub with narrow egg-shaped leaves with the narrower end towards the base, and clusters of up to ten yellow to red flowers with reddish markings.

== Description ==
Pultenaea microphylla is an erect to prostrate shrub that typically grows to a height of up to 2 m (6 ft 7 in) and has softly-hairy stems. The leaves are arranged alternately, linear to narrow egg-shaped leaves with the narrower end towards the base, 2–15 mm (0.079–0.591 in) long and 1–2 mm (0.039–0.079 in) wide with a small point on the end. The flowers are arranged singly or in clusters of up to ten near the ends of branchlets, each flower about 5–10 mm (0.20–0.39 in) long on pedicels 1.0–1.5 mm (0.039–0.059 in) long with hairy, narrow triangular bracteoles 1–3 mm (0.039–0.118 in) long attached to the base of the sepal tube. The sepals are 2.5–6 mm (0.098–0.236 in) long and hairy. The standard petal is yellow with red markings and 7–12 mm (0.28–0.47 in) long, the wings yellow and the keel dark red. Flowering occurs from September to December and the fruit is a flat pod 3–5 mm (0.12–0.20 in) long.

== Taxonomy and naming ==
Pultenaea microphylla was first formally described in 1825 by Augustin Pyramus de Candolle in Prodromus Systematis Naturalis Regni Vegetabilis from an unpublished description by Franz Sieber.

== Distribution and habitat ==
This pultenaea grows in woodland and forest and is widespread in the Australian Capital Territory, New South Wales and south-eastern Queensland. There is a single record from Tubbut in far north-eastern Victoria.
