= P. macrophyllum =

P. macrophyllum may refer to:

- Phoradendron macrophyllum, the Colorado desert mistletoe, bigleaf mistletoe or Christmas mistletoe, a flowering plant species native to western North America
- Polygonum macrophyllum, a synonym for Bistorta macrophylla, a plant species found in Asia
