= P. microphyllus =

P. microphyllus may refer to:

- Philadelphus microphyllus, the littleleaf mock-orange, a plant species native to northern Mexico and the southwestern quadrant of the United States as far north as Wyoming
- Pilocarpus microphyllus, a shrub species found in Brazil
