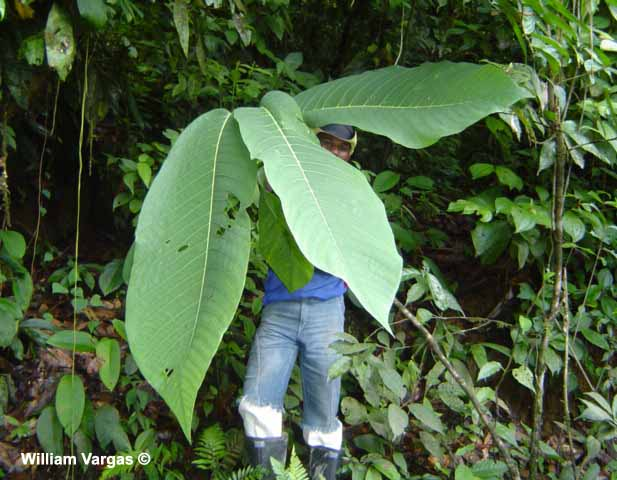

Conservation status
- Least Concern (IUCN 3.1)

Scientific classification
- Kingdom: Plantae
- Clade: Tracheophytes
- Clade: Angiosperms
- Clade: Eudicots
- Clade: Rosids
- Order: Malpighiales
- Family: Passifloraceae
- Genus: Passiflora
- Species: P. macrophylla

Binomial name
- Passiflora macrophylla Spruce ex Mast.

Synonyms
- P. gigantifolia Harms; P. lorifera Mast. & André

= Passiflora macrophylla =

Species of vine

Passiflora macrophylla is a species of flowering plant in the family Passifloraceae. It is commonly called the tree passion flower, and is one of the relatively few species in Passiflora with a tree-like growth pattern (growing to 10–20 ft). The leaves can grow up to three feet long by one foot wide. Flowers are borne as inflorescences from the trunk as the plant does not often branch. The flowers have white petals and a yellow corona. Rounded fruits follow and may reach 2 in (5.1 cm) in diameter. It is native to humid and wet lowland regions of Ecuador with one collection reported from Colombia.
