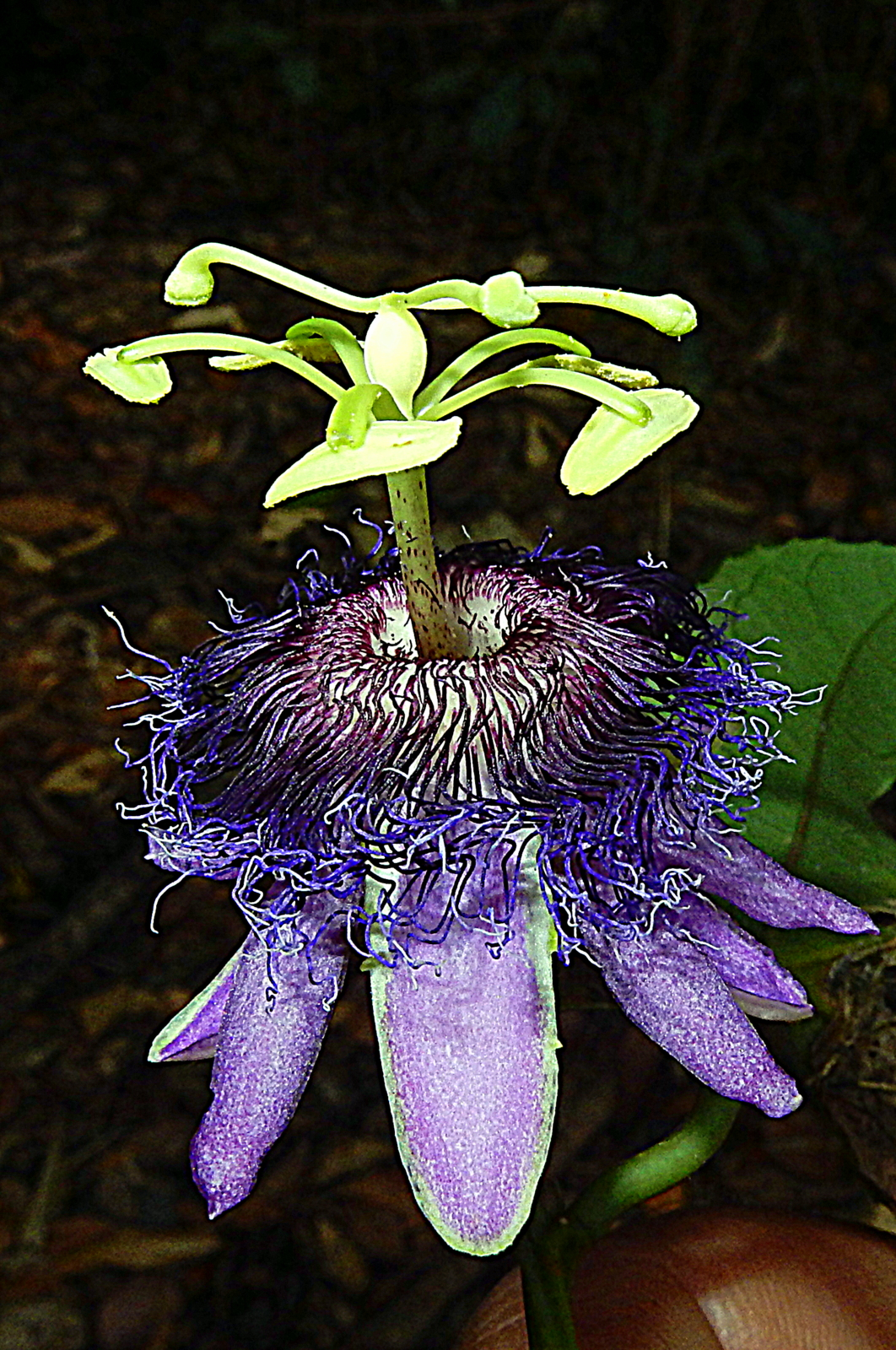

Scientific classification
- Kingdom: Plantae
- Clade: Tracheophytes
- Clade: Angiosperms
- Clade: Eudicots
- Clade: Rosids
- Order: Malpighiales
- Family: Passifloraceae
- Genus: Passiflora
- Species: P. cacao

Binomial name
- Passiflora cacao Bernacci & M. M. Souza 2012

= Passiflora cacao =

Species of plant

Passiflora cacao is a species of Passiflora found in São Paulo and Southern Bahia, Brazil. The plant flowers in the winter in habitat

== Gallery ==
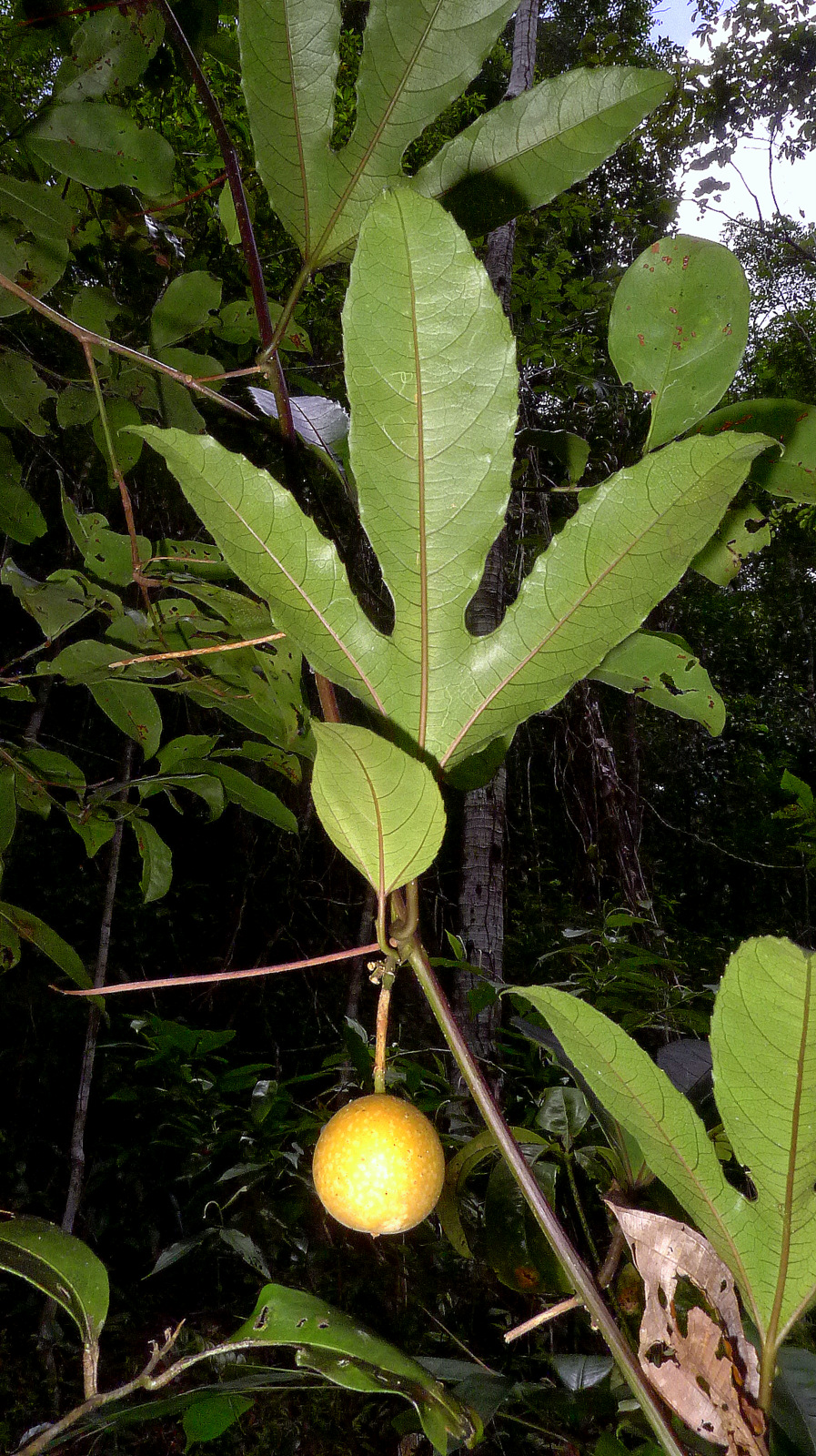
fruit

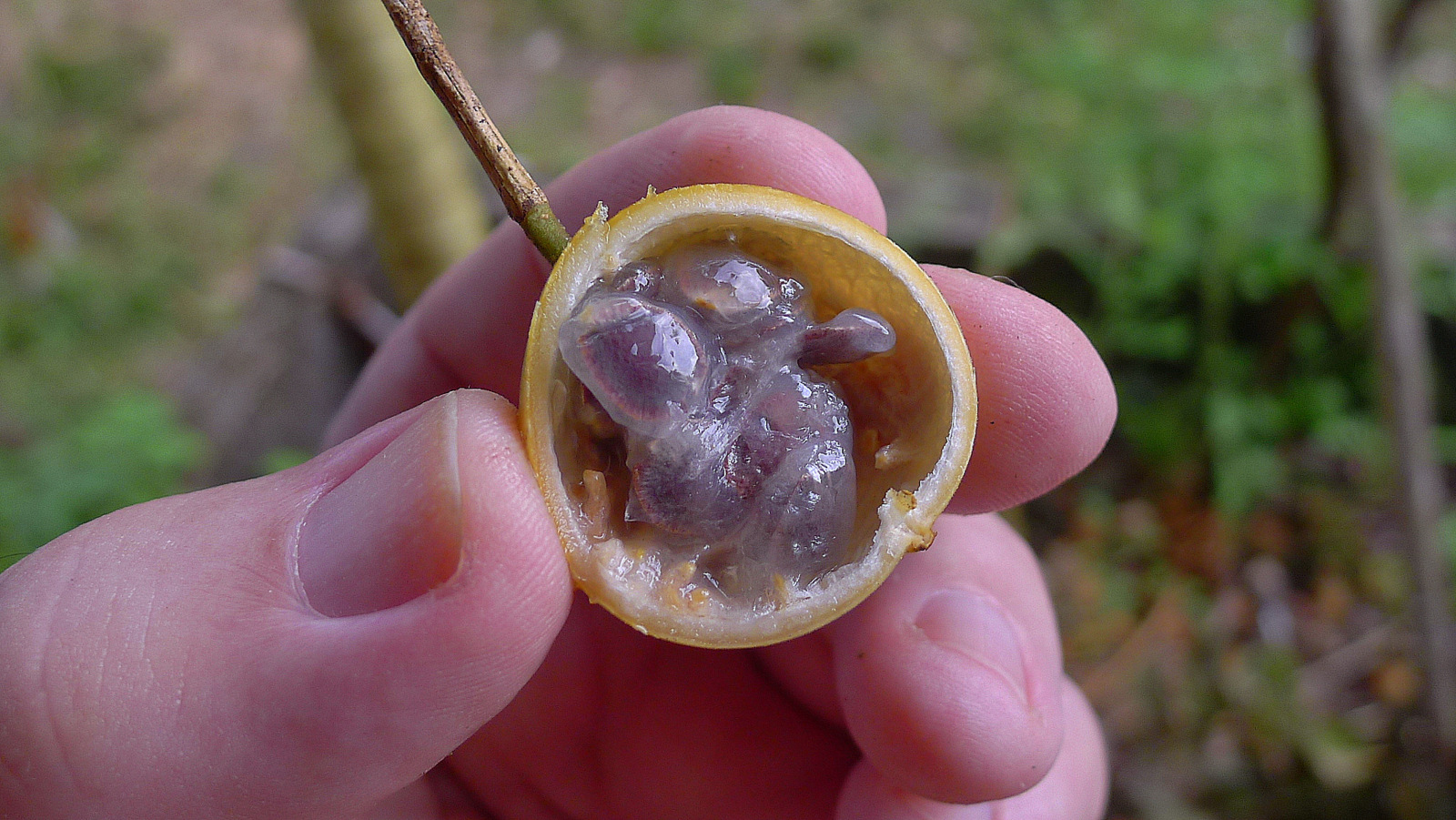
fruit cross section

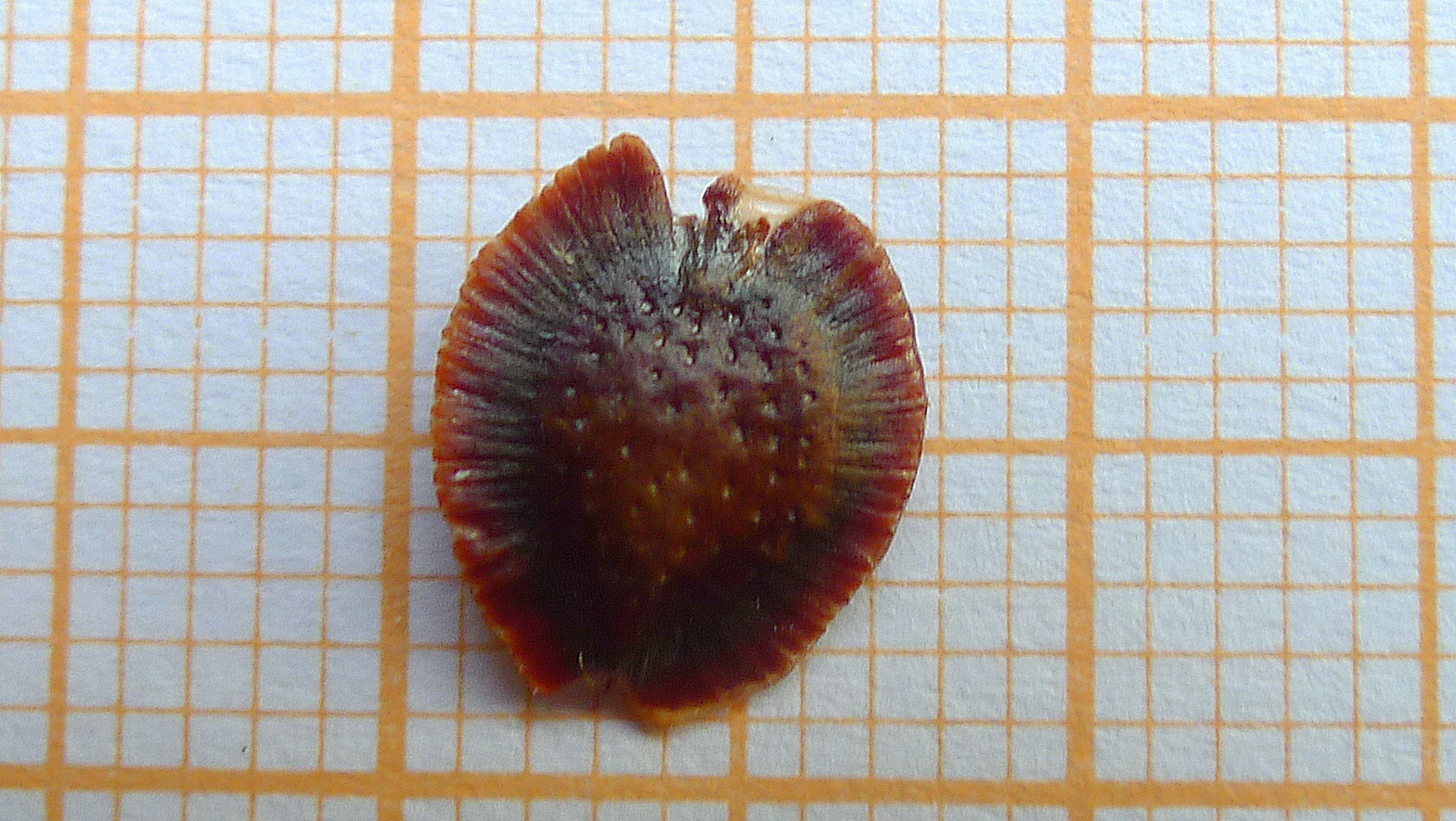
seed

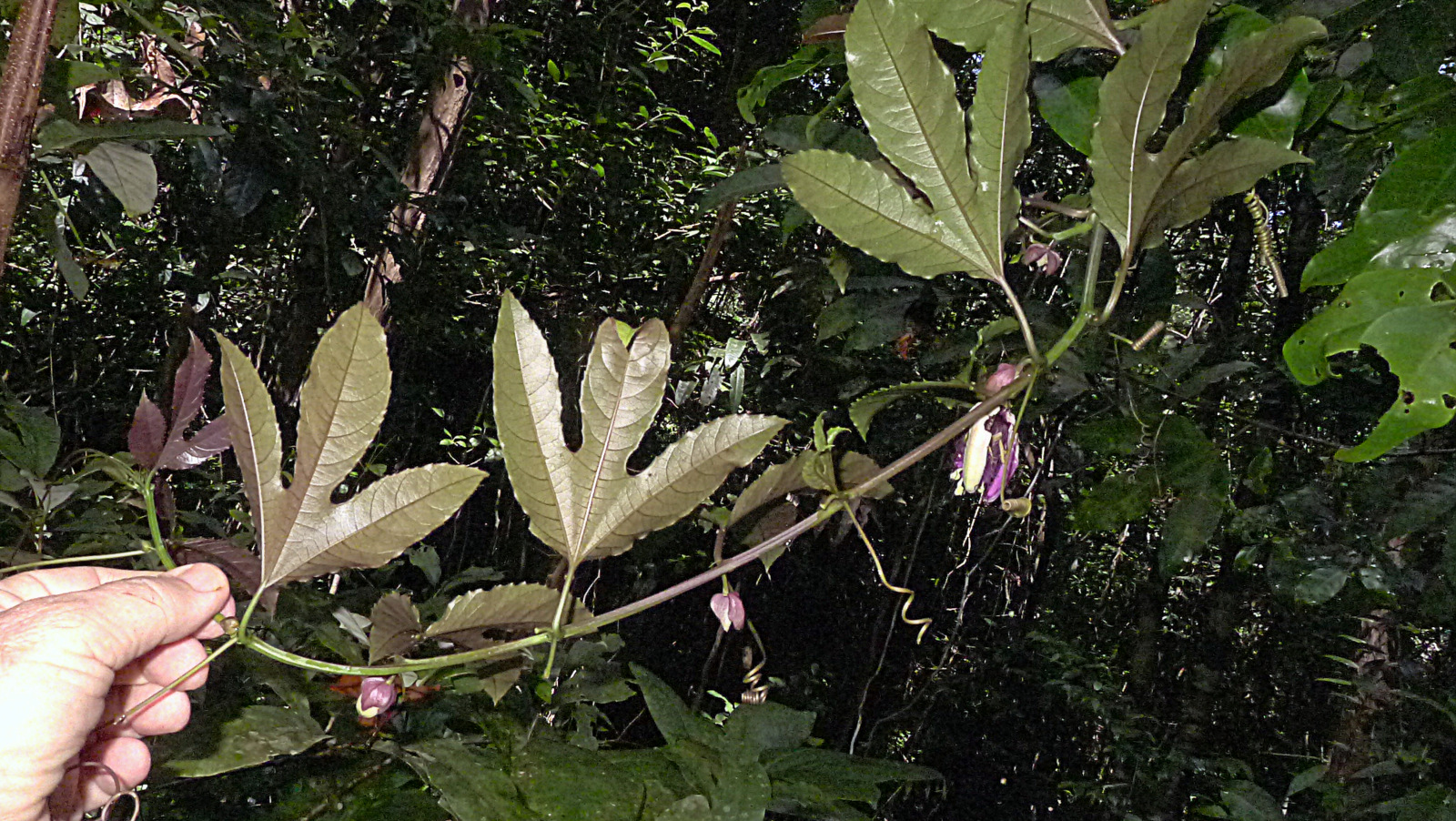
Leaf back

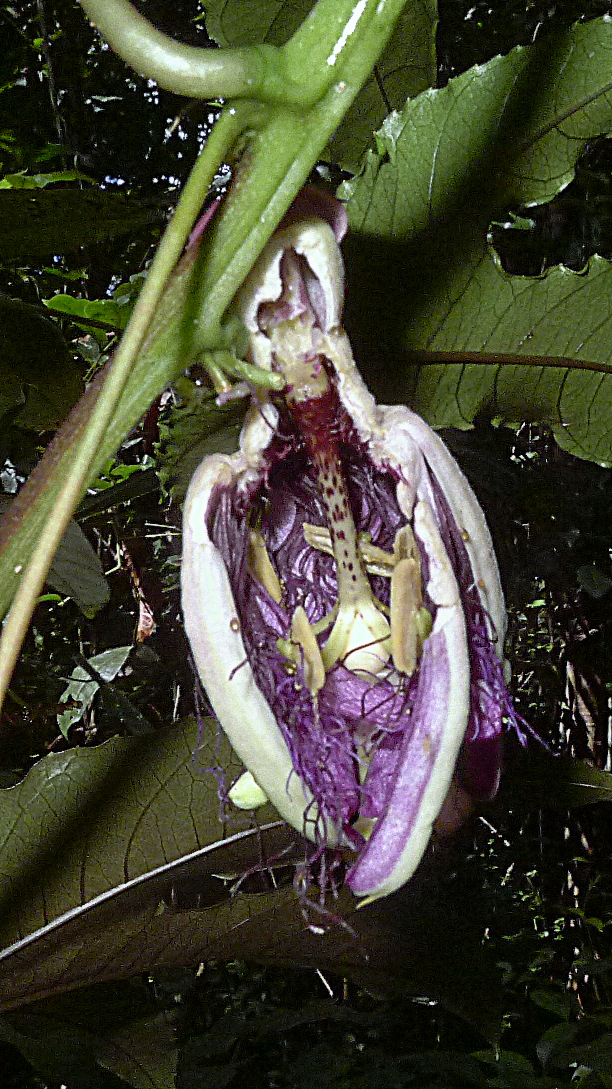
Bud cross section

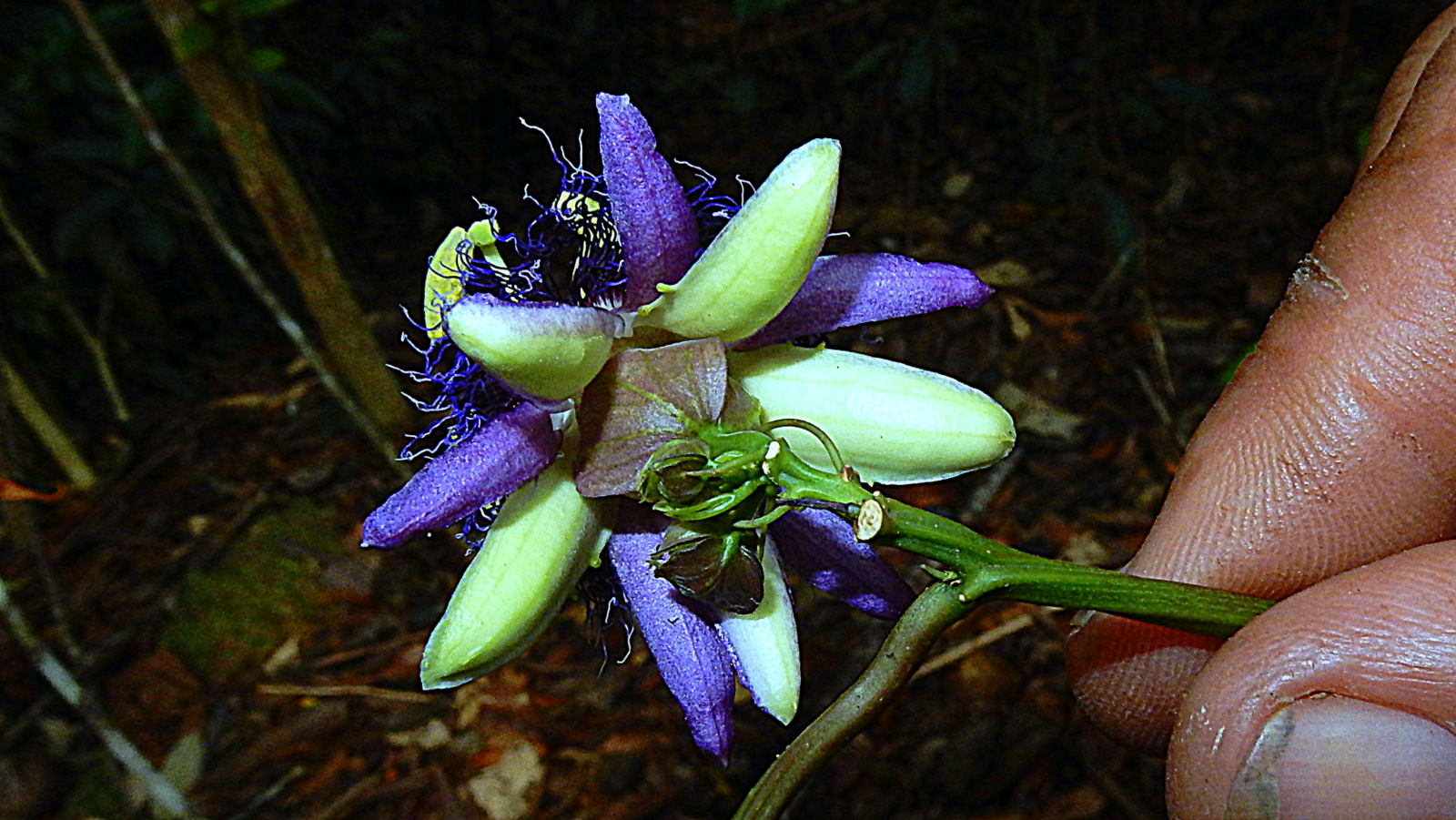
top of flower
