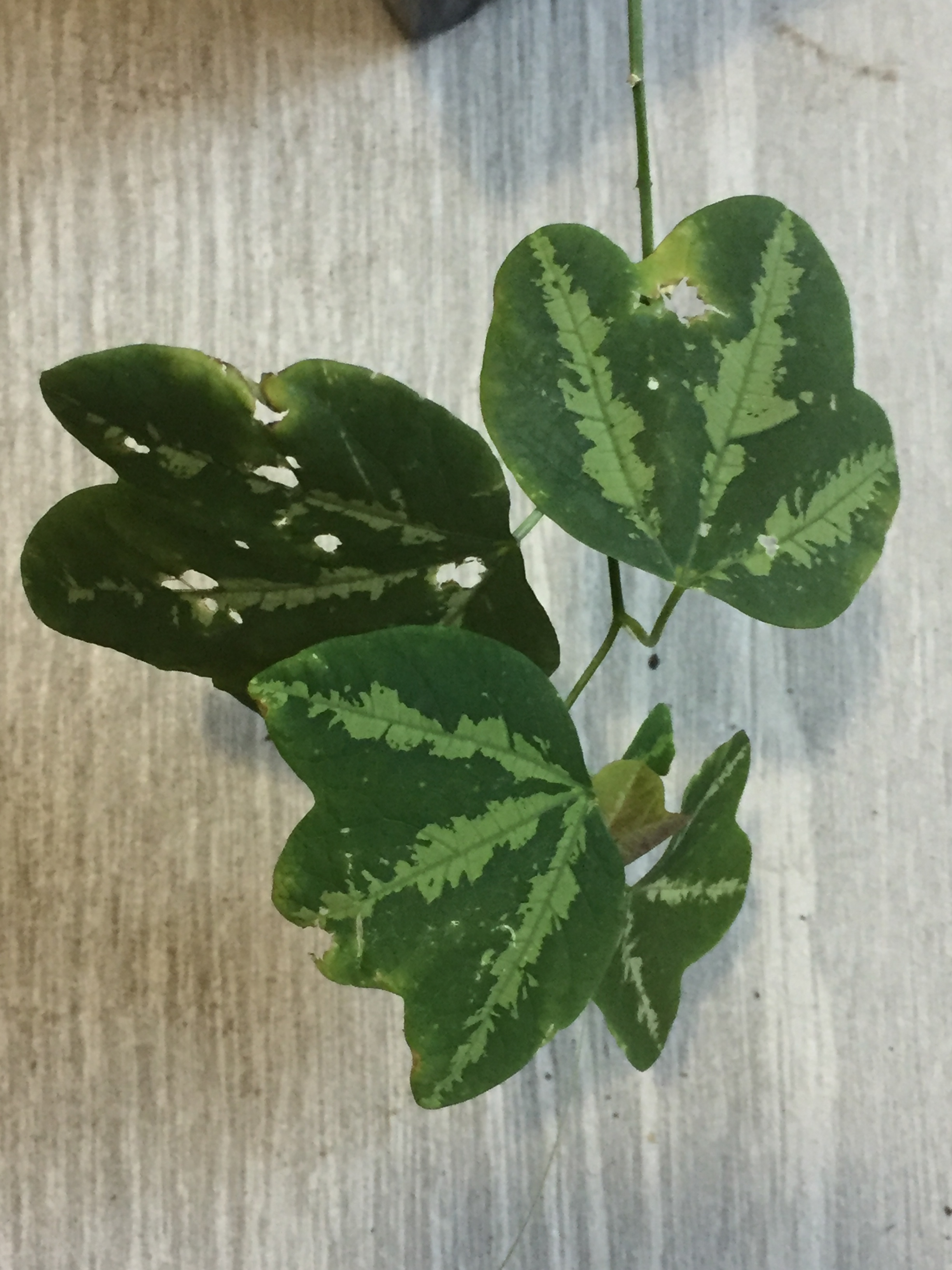

Scientific classification
- Kingdom: Plantae
- Clade: Embryophytes
- Clade: Tracheophytes
- Clade: Angiosperms
- Clade: Eudicots
- Clade: Rosids
- Order: Malpighiales
- Family: Passifloraceae
- Genus: Passiflora
- Species: P. trifasciata

Binomial name
- Passiflora trifasciata Lem.

= Passiflora trifasciata =

Species of flowering plant

Passiflora trifasciata is an endangered species of South American passionflower, native to the area spanning Ecuador to western Bolivia. Classified in subgenus Decaloba and supersection Decaloba, it is a liana with variegated leaves and small, fragrant white flowers.
