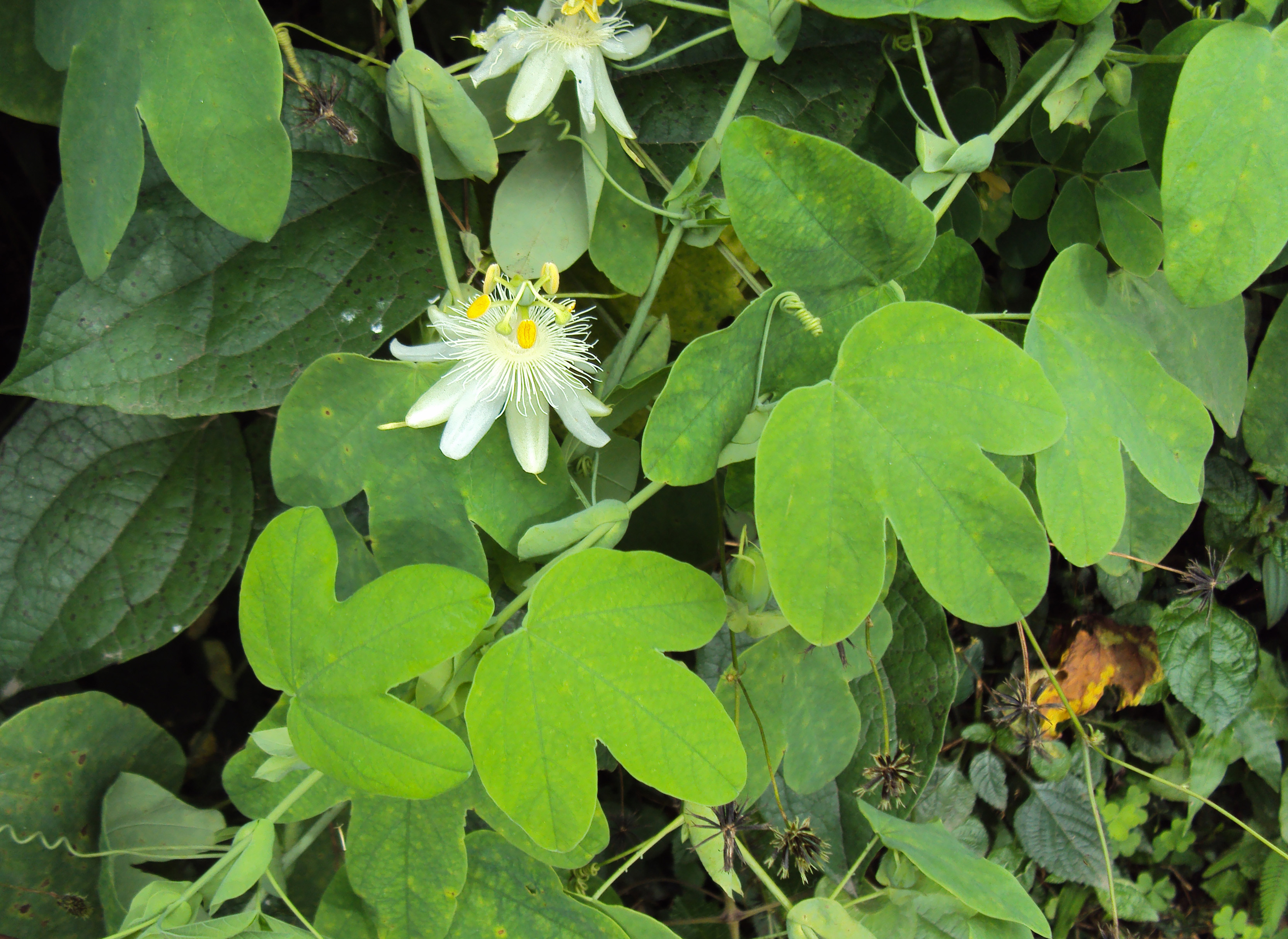

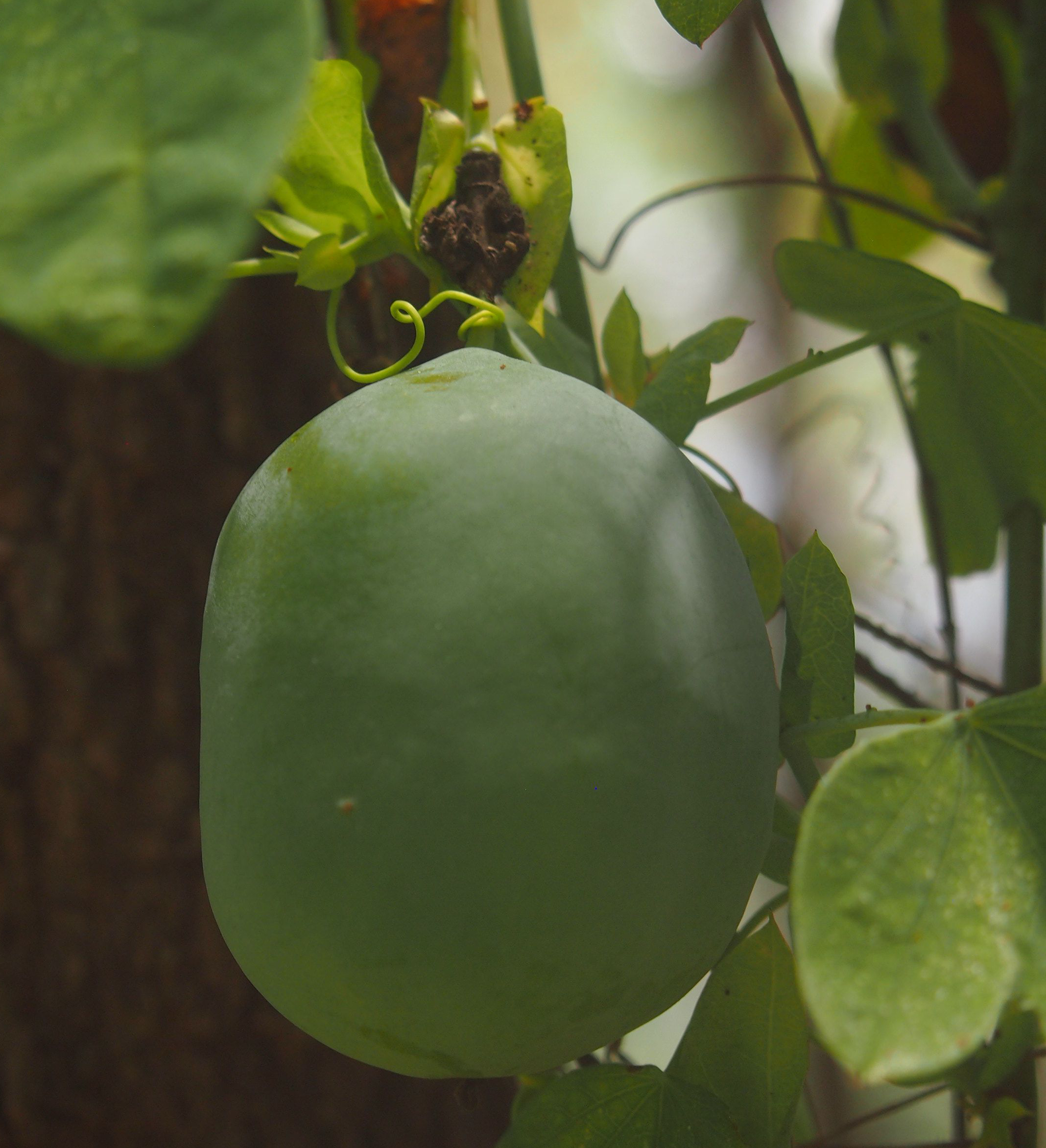

Scientific classification
- Kingdom: Plantae
- Clade: Tracheophytes
- Clade: Angiosperms
- Clade: Eudicots
- Clade: Rosids
- Order: Malpighiales
- Family: Passifloraceae
- Genus: Passiflora
- Species: P. subpeltata

Binomial name
- Passiflora subpeltata Ortega

= Passiflora subpeltata =

White passionflower

Species of vine

Passiflora subpeltata, commonly known as white passionflower, is a passion flower bearing yellow-green fruits. It is a vining plant with three-lobed leaves and 2-3 ornate flowers. It is grown as an ornamental plant. This vine is also a marginal pest in areas.

== See also ==
- Passion fruit
