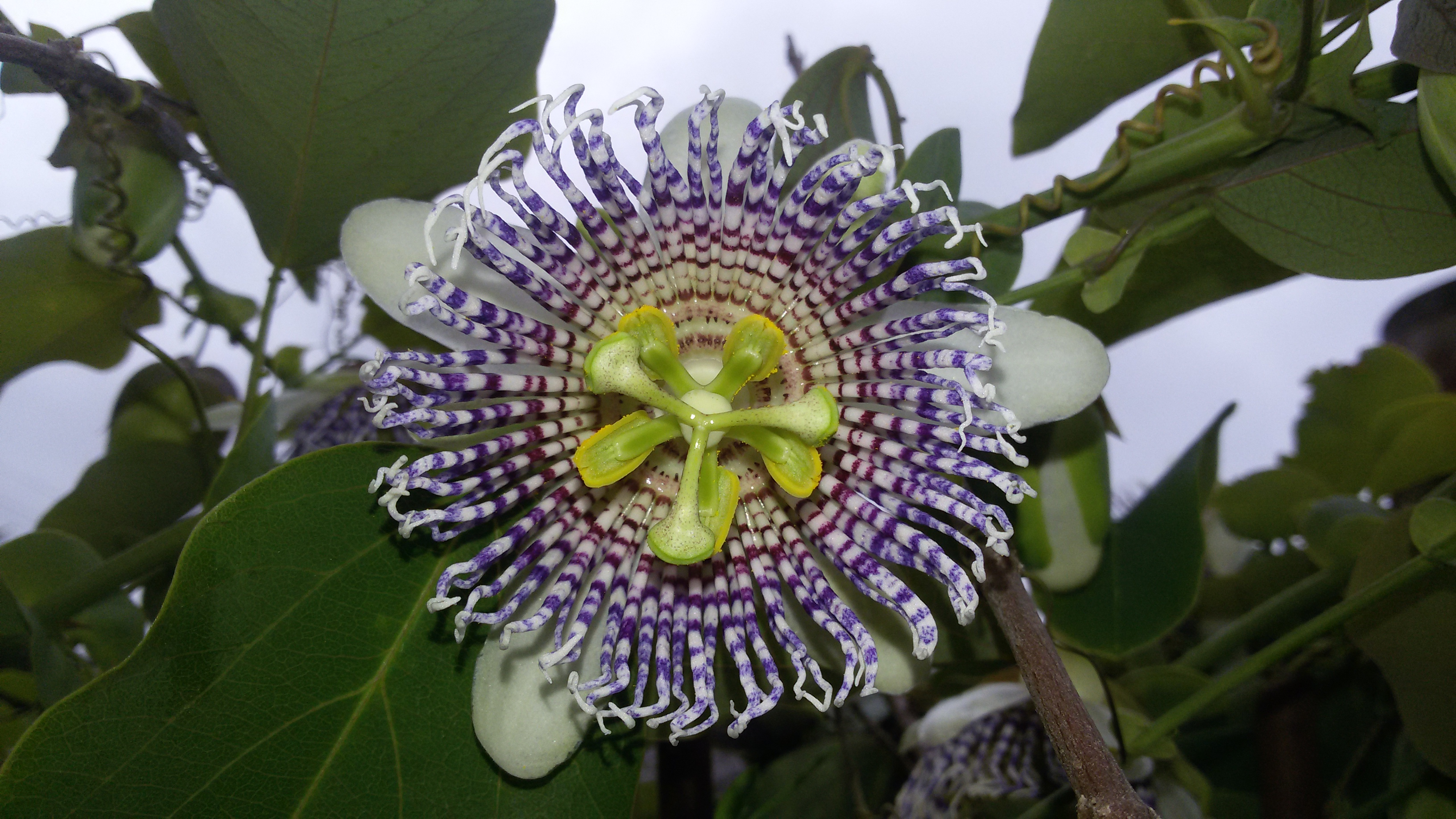

Scientific classification
- Kingdom: Plantae
- Clade: Embryophytes
- Clade: Tracheophytes
- Clade: Angiosperms
- Clade: Eudicots
- Clade: Rosids
- Order: Malpighiales
- Family: Passifloraceae
- Genus: Passiflora
- Species: P. actinia

Binomial name
- Passiflora actinia Hook.

Synonyms
- P. paulensis Killip

= Passiflora actinia =

Species of vine

Passiflora actinia, also known as the sea anemone passion flower, is a species of passion flower (passionfruit) of the Passifloraceae. It flowers mainly in early spring, producing white, mauve (purple), and blue flowers about 9 cm wide.

Passiflora actinia is an evergreen vine. Native to Brazil, it is a relatively cold tolerant passion flower, and can be seen in gardens in England. Its edible fruit (a passionfruit) is golden orange when ripe, and about 10 cm long. Passion fruit is a good source of nutrients, especially fiber, vitamin C, and provitamin A.

A single purple passion fruit contains (1Trusted Source):

- Calories: 17
- Fiber: 2 grams
- Vitamin C: 9% of the Daily Value (DV)
- Vitamin A: 8% of the DV
- Iron: 2% of the DV
- Potassium: 2% of the D

Its specific name might be in reference to the scientific name of the sea anemones (Actiniara), since it resembles one.
