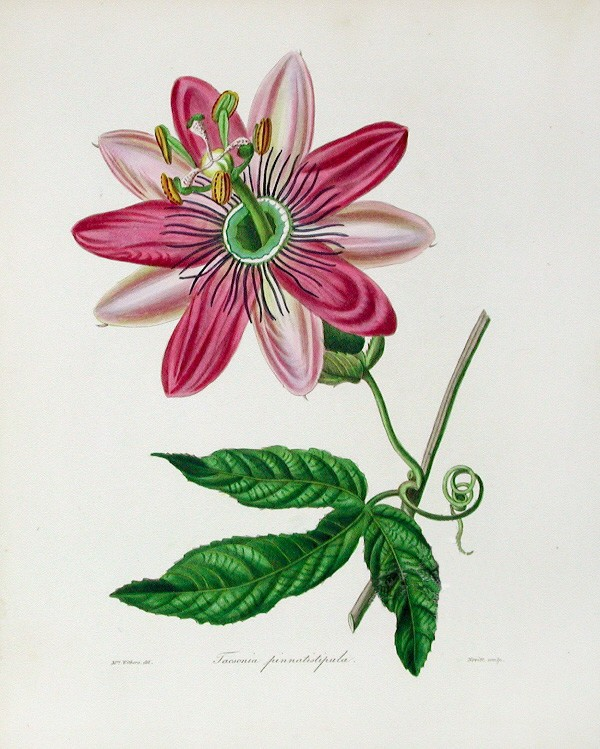

Scientific classification
- Kingdom: Plantae
- Clade: Tracheophytes
- Clade: Angiosperms
- Clade: Eudicots
- Clade: Rosids
- Order: Malpighiales
- Family: Passifloraceae
- Genus: Passiflora
- Species: P. pinnatistipula

Binomial name
- Passiflora pinnatistipula Cav.

= Passiflora pinnatistipula =

Species of vine

Passiflora pinnatistipula, commonly known as poro poro or gulupa (Colombia), is a climbing perennial that grows in the Cajamarca region of Peru. The departments of Cundinamarca and Boyaca in Colombia produce the purple variety; the yellow, "Hawaiiana" variety is mainly grown in the Valley of Cauca. It has also been cultivated in Australia, India, U.S. (Hawaii & Florida), Kenya, Java, Sumatra, Malaysia, Fiji, Papua New Guinea and Taiwan.

The species is listed on the Ark of Taste with other San Marcos Andean Fruits that are in danger of extinction. It produces impressive flowers and yellow fruit with an oblong shape containing many small seeds. The flesh is reminiscent of an orange and is used for beverages, jams, sorbets and salad dressing.
