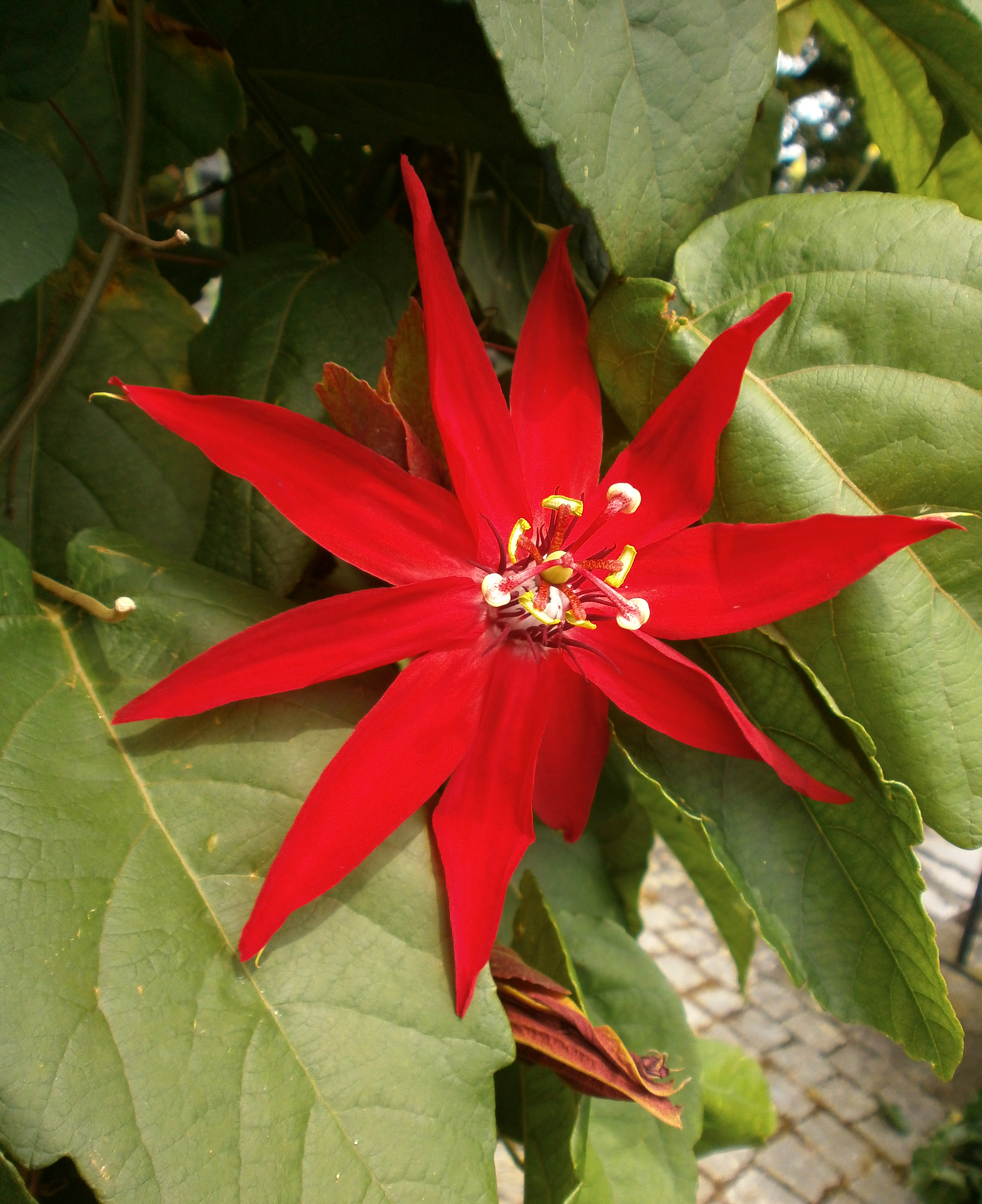

Scientific classification
- Kingdom: Plantae
- Clade: Tracheophytes
- Clade: Angiosperms
- Clade: Eudicots
- Clade: Rosids
- Order: Malpighiales
- Family: Passifloraceae
- Genus: Passiflora
- Species: P. miniata

Binomial name
- Passiflora miniata Vanderpl.

= Passiflora miniata =

Species of flowering plant

Passiflora miniata, commonly known as the red passionflower, is a flowering plant of the passion flower family (Passifloraceae). It is a vine with tendrils up to 33 cm (13 in) long, and red flowers with a purple corona; these flowers, up to 13 cm (5.1 in) wide, are among the largest in the genus.
