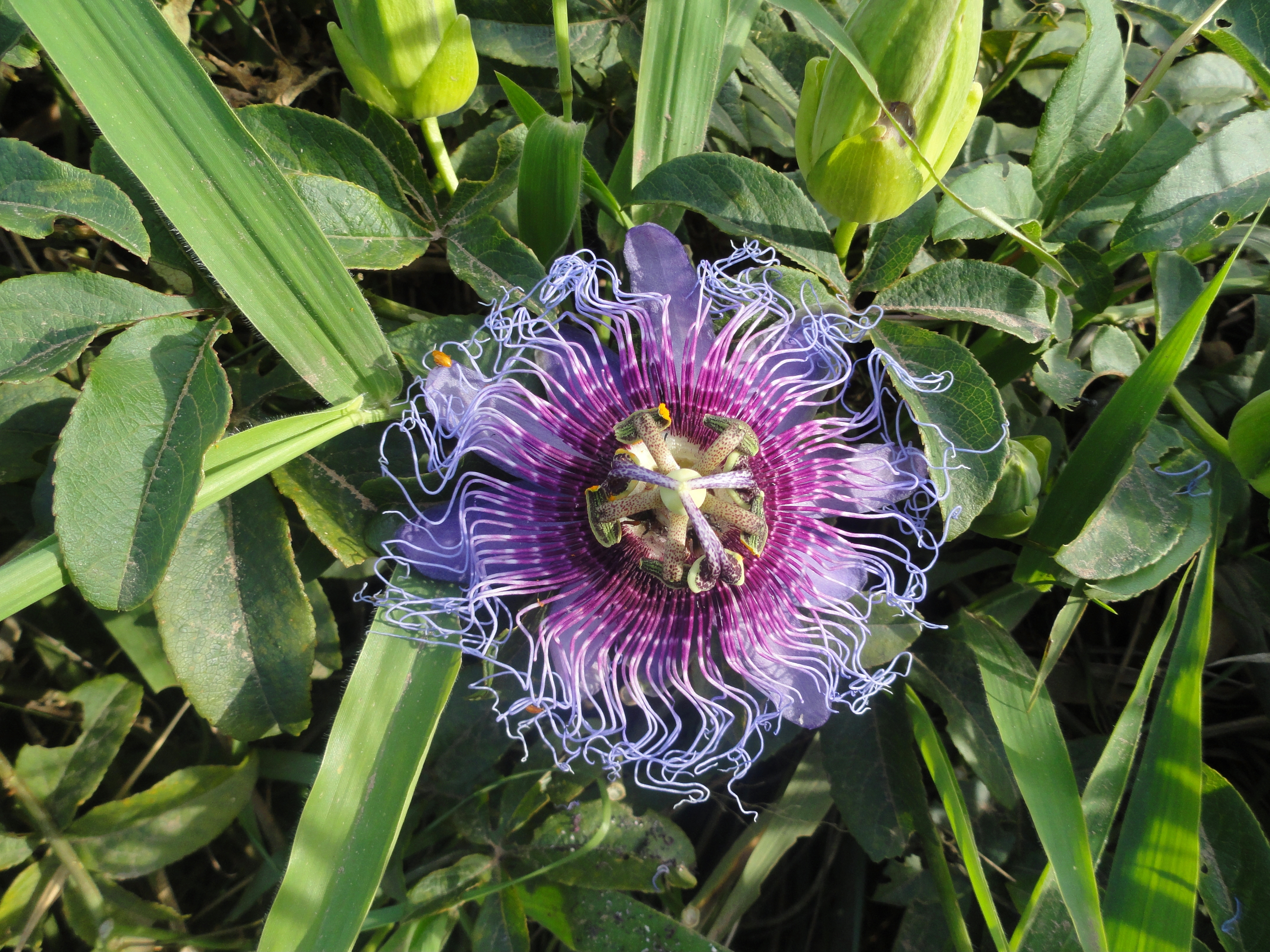

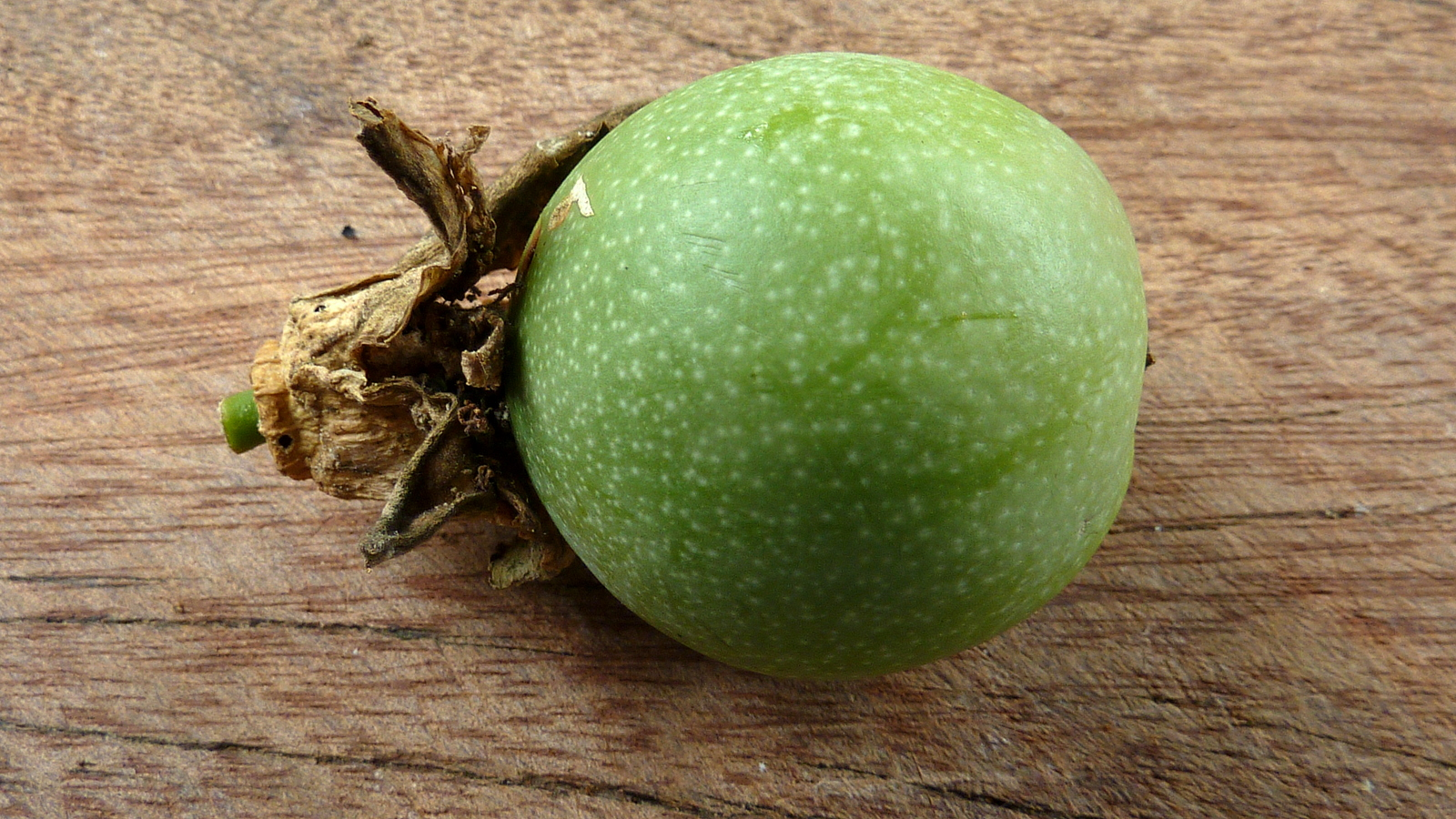

Scientific classification
- Kingdom: Plantae
- Clade: Tracheophytes
- Clade: Angiosperms
- Clade: Eudicots
- Clade: Rosids
- Order: Malpighiales
- Family: Passifloraceae
- Genus: Passiflora
- Species: P. cincinnata

Binomial name
- Passiflora cincinnata Mast.

Synonyms
- Heterotypic Synonyms: Passiflora cincinnata var. imbricata Chodat & Hassl.; Passiflora cincinnata var. minor Hoehne; Passiflora perlobata Killip; Passiflora pisonis Kostel.

= Passiflora cincinnata =

Species of vine

Passiflora cincinnata is a species of flowering plant in the family Passifloraceae. It is native to Argentina, Bolivia, Brazil, Colombia, Paraguay, and Venezuela.
