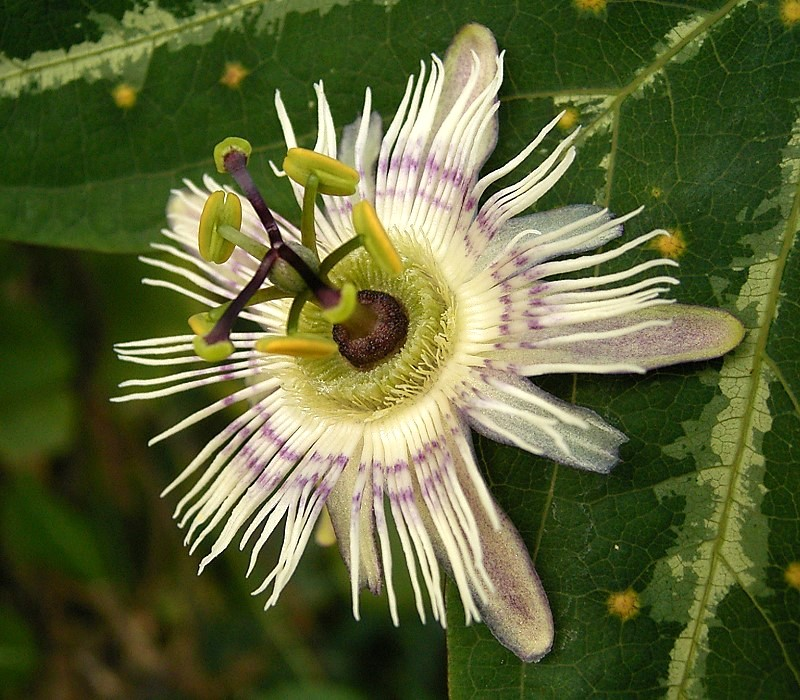
- P. pardifolia was only described in 2006

Scientific classification
- Kingdom: Plantae
- Clade: Tracheophytes
- Clade: Angiosperms
- Clade: Eudicots
- Clade: Rosids
- Order: Malpighiales
- Family: Passifloraceae
- Genus: Passiflora
- Species: P. pardifolia

Binomial name
- Passiflora pardifolia Vanderpl.

= Passiflora pardifolia =

Species of vine

Passiflora pardifolia is a small Passiflora with very distinct leaf markings. The leaf markings of P. pardifolia look very similar to the dumbcane. The fruits of P. pardifolia looks similar to the blueberry.
