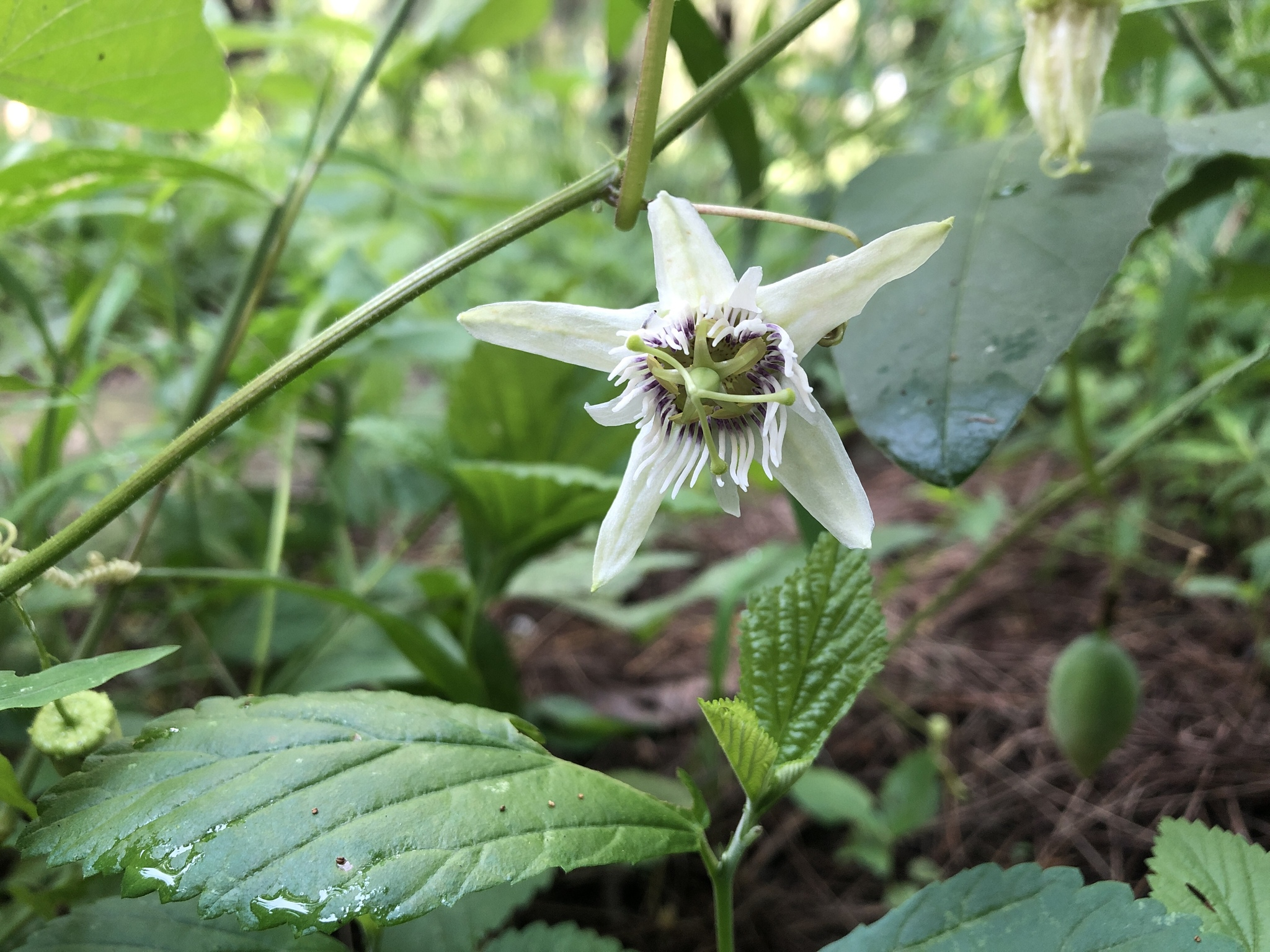

Scientific classification
- Kingdom: Plantae
- Clade: Tracheophytes
- Clade: Angiosperms
- Clade: Eudicots
- Clade: Rosids
- Order: Malpighiales
- Family: Passifloraceae
- Genus: Passiflora
- Species: P. bryonioides

Binomial name
- Passiflora bryonioides Kunth.

Synonyms
- Decaloba bryonioides (Kunth) M. Roem.; Passiflora bryonifolia Kunth ex Spreng.; Passiflora inamoena A. Gray; Passiflora karsteniana A. Dietr.; Passiflora serrata L.

= Passiflora bryonioides =

Species of vine

Passiflora bryonioides, the cupped passionflower, is a plant in the genus Passiflora, family Passifloraceae. It is native to northern Mexico (Sonora, Chihuahua, Sinaloa and Guanajuato) and the south-western United States (Arizona).

The plant is a perennial vine up to 2 m tall that climbs via tendrils and has palmately-lobed leaves. Flowers are white with purple stripes along the petals. Fruits are pale green and ovoid.
