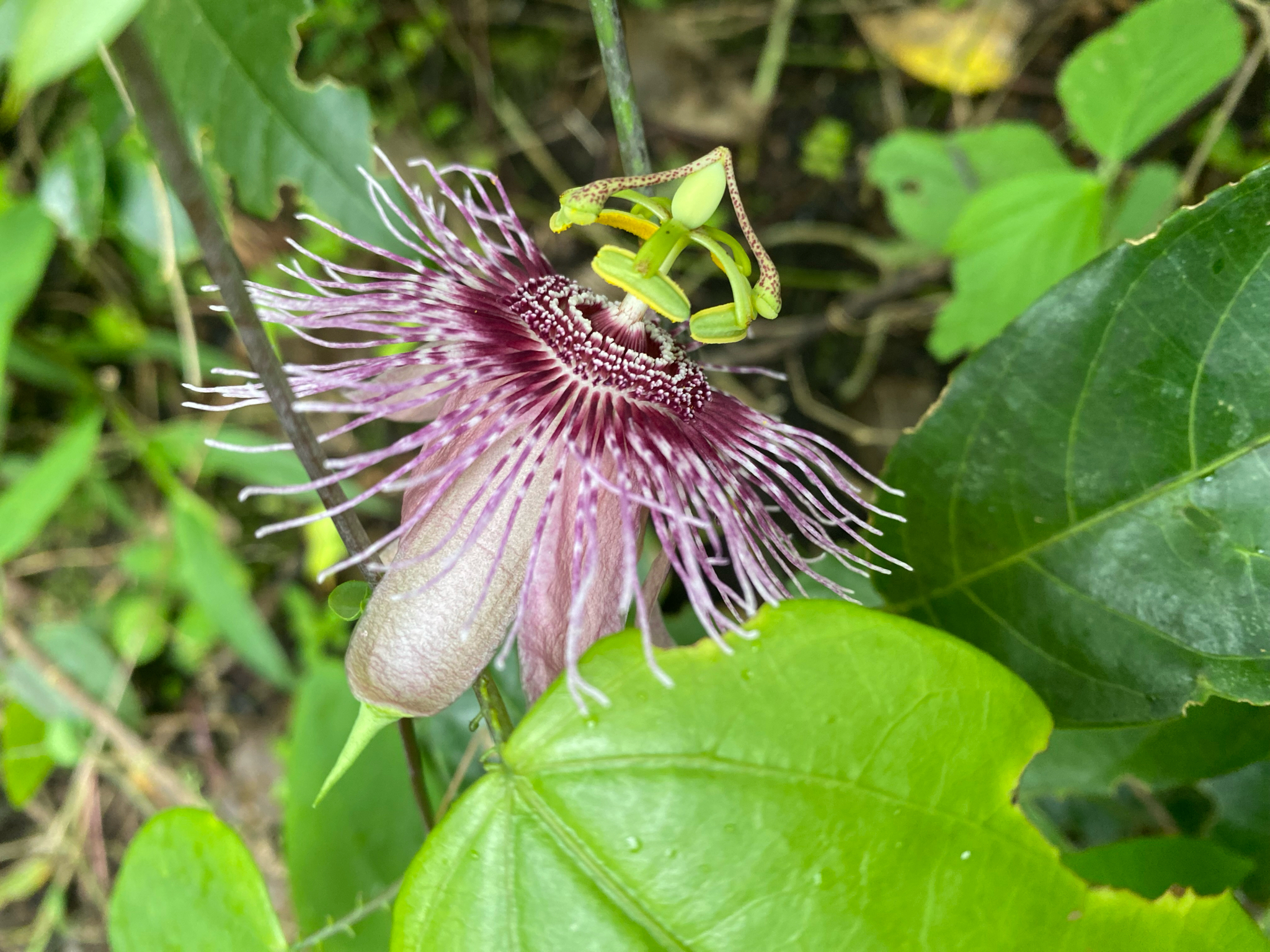

Scientific classification
- Kingdom: Plantae
- Clade: Tracheophytes
- Clade: Angiosperms
- Clade: Eudicots
- Clade: Rosids
- Order: Malpighiales
- Family: Passifloraceae
- Genus: Passiflora
- Species: P. oerstedii

Binomial name
- Passiflora oerstedii Mast.

= Passiflora oerstedii =

Species of plant

Passiflora oerstedii is a species of passionflower. It was first described by Maxwell T. Masters in 1872.

== Description ==
Passiflora oerstedii is a member of the passionflower genus Passiflora.

== Range ==
It is native to Belize, Bolivia, Brazil, Colombia, Costa Rica, Ecuador, Guatemala, Honduras, Mexico, Nicaragua, Panamá, Paraguay, and Venezuela.

== Etymology ==
It was named by Maxwell T. Masters after the Danish botanist Anders Sandøe Ørsted.
