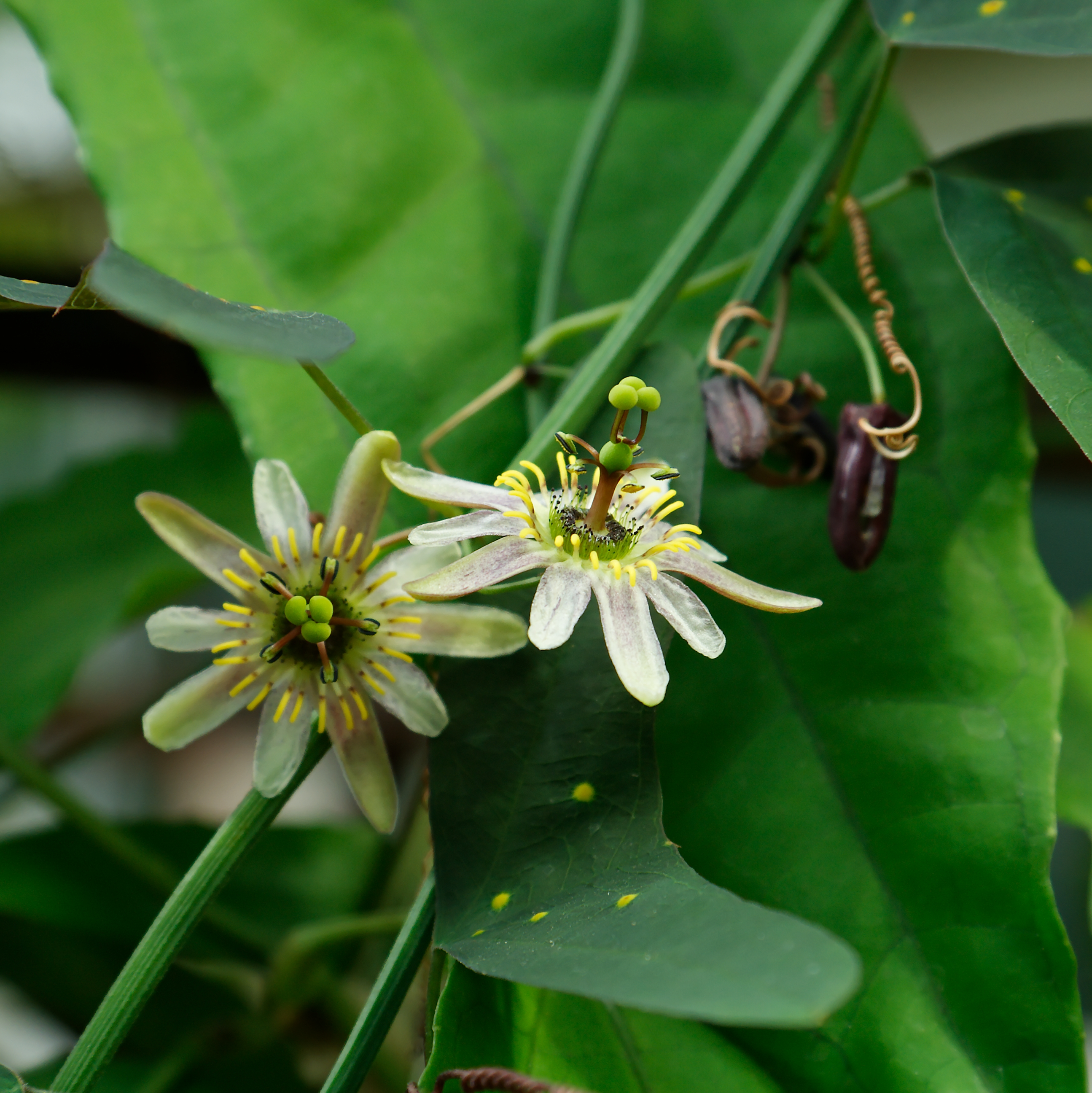

Scientific classification
- Kingdom: Plantae
- Clade: Tracheophytes
- Clade: Angiosperms
- Clade: Eudicots
- Clade: Rosids
- Order: Malpighiales
- Family: Passifloraceae
- Genus: Passiflora
- Species: P. biflora

Binomial name
- Passiflora biflora Lam.

= Passiflora biflora =

Species of vine

Passiflora biflora, the twoflowered passionflower, is a vine with paired peduncles and flowers up to 3.5 cm (1.4 in) wide. It is native to the New World from Mexico to Colombia, Venezuela, and the West Indies. In Florida, P. biflora has been classified by the Exotic Pest Plant Council as a non-native species that has the "potential to disrupt native plant communities." Besides the paired flowers, its other unique feature is its corona which is entirely yellow.

== Uses ==
Van den Bergh 1994 and Ochse & van den Brink 1980 report the flowers are eaten in Indonesia and Malaysia.
