= Passiflora coactilis =

Scientific classification
- Kingdom: Plantae
- Clade: Tracheophytes
- Clade: Angiosperms
- Clade: Eudicots
- Clade: Rosids
- Order: Malpighiales
- Family: Passifloraceae
- Genus: Passiflora
- Species: P. coactilis

Binomial name
- Passiflora coactilis (Mast.) Killip

Synonyms
- Homotypic Synonyms: Tacsonia coactilis Mast.; Heterotypic Synonyms: Passiflora mariae (Sodiro) Harms; Tacsonia mariae Sodiro; Tacsonia mariae var. chimborazensis Sodiro

Species of flowering plant

Passiflora coactilis is a species of passion flower belonging to the Maypop Family, Passifloraceae. It is native to Colombia and Ecuador. Its most unique feature is its very long androgynophore (a central column to which the stamens and the pistil and eventually the fruit are all attached) which is up to 11 cm (4.3 in) in length.
