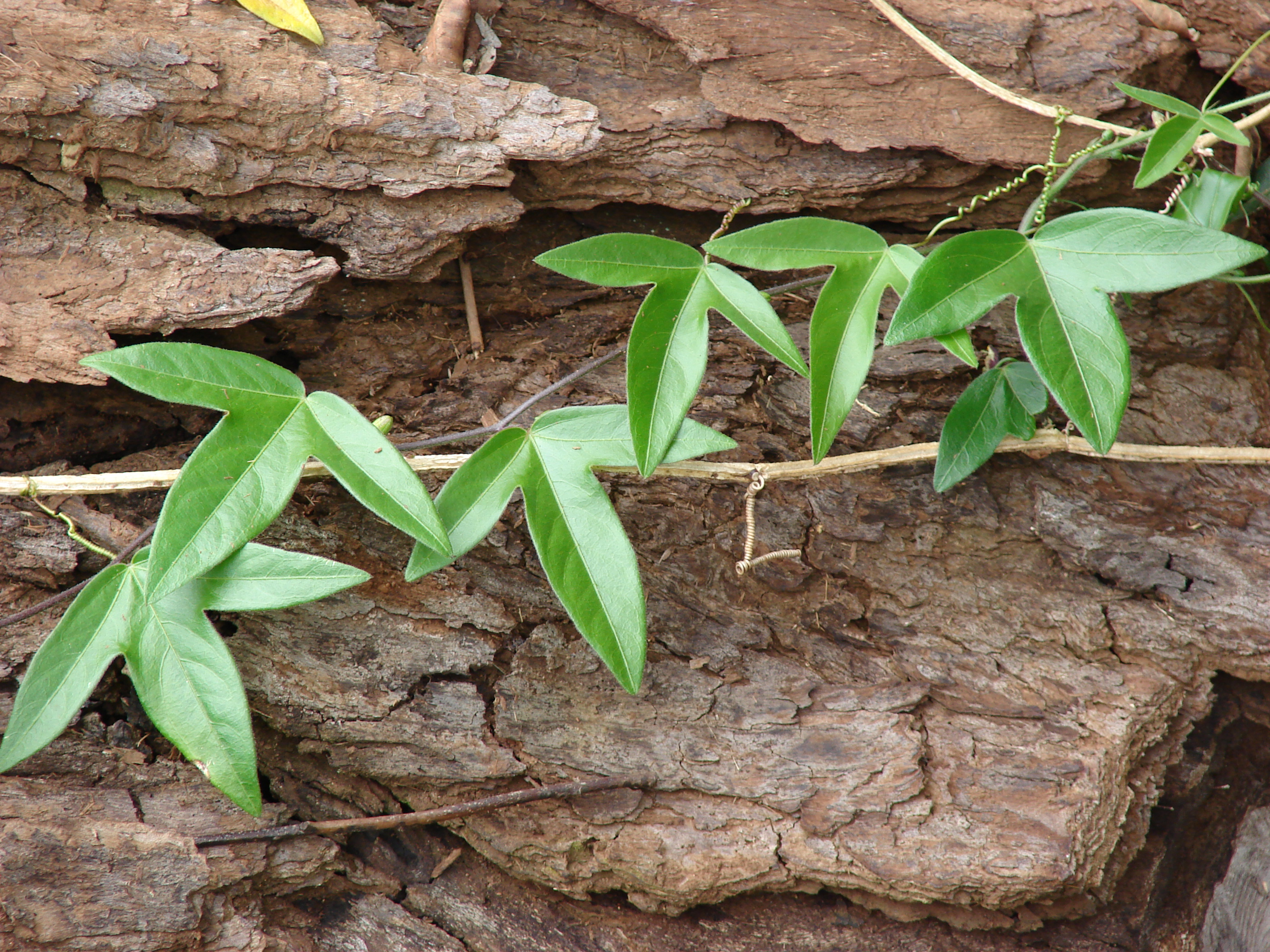

Conservation status
- Secure (NatureServe)

Scientific classification
- Kingdom: Plantae
- Clade: Tracheophytes
- Clade: Angiosperms
- Clade: Eudicots
- Clade: Rosids
- Order: Malpighiales
- Family: Passifloraceae
- Genus: Passiflora
- Species: P. suberosa

Binomial name
- Passiflora suberosa L.

Synonyms
- Passiflora pallida L.

= Passiflora suberosa =

Species of plant

Passiflora suberosa is a species of passionflower that is native to the Americas. It is commonly known as corkystem passionflower due to the corkiness of older stems. Other common names include corky passion vine, cork-bark passion flower, corkstem passionflower and corky passionfruit. In Latin America it is called Meloncillo. It is possibly also cryptic and have multiple species in one.

== Description ==
=== Leaves and stems ===
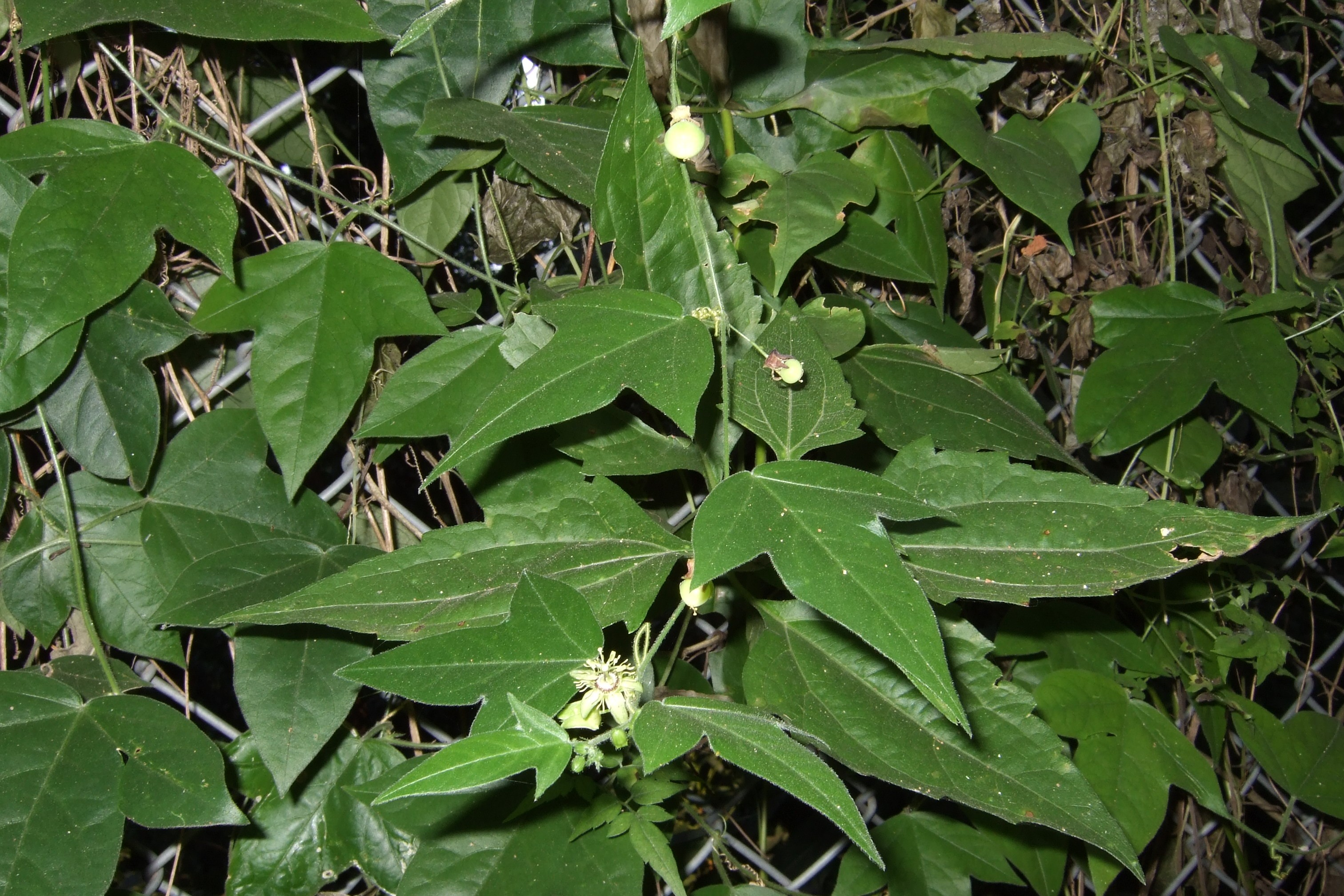
Leaves of plant

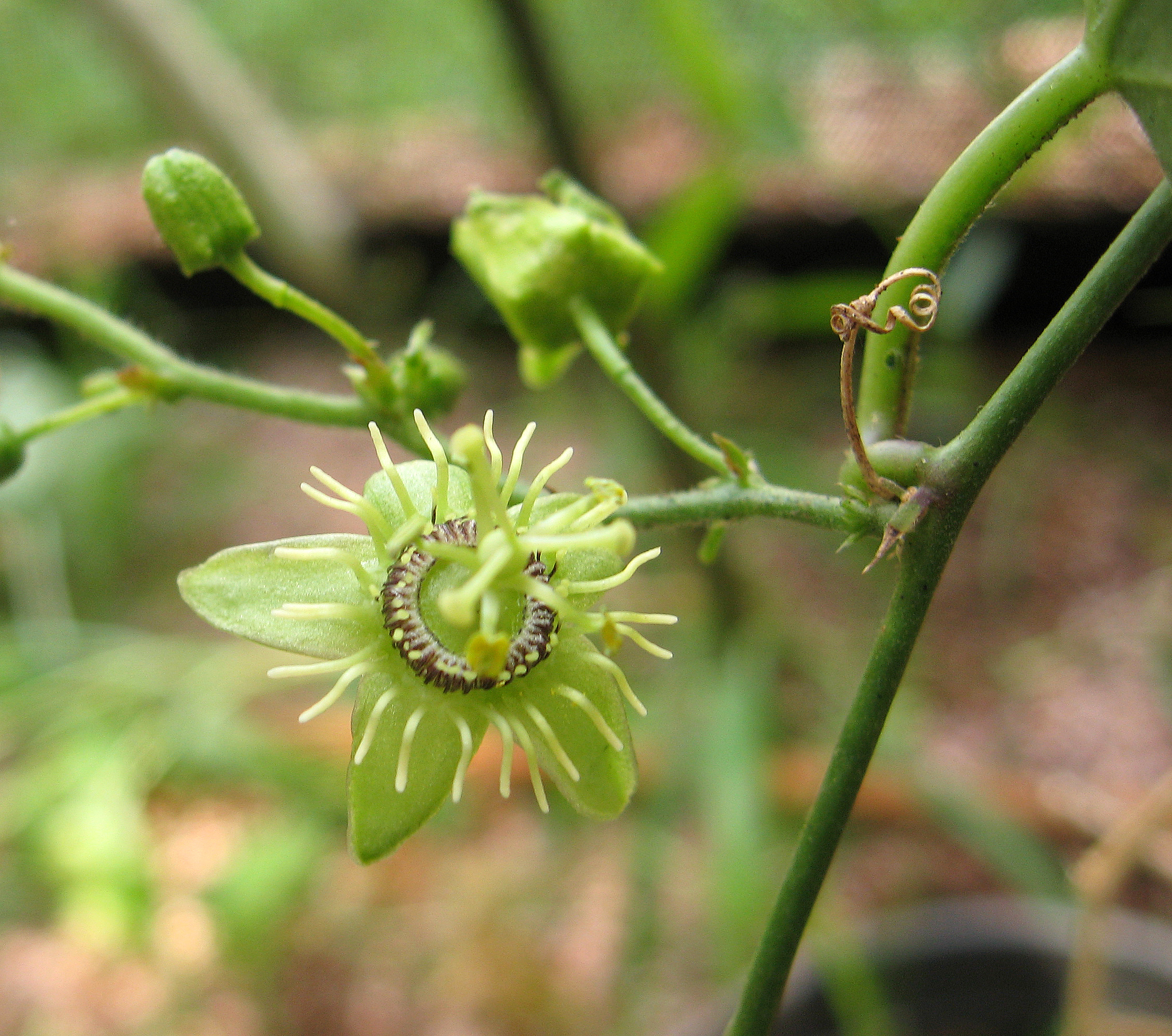
Flower

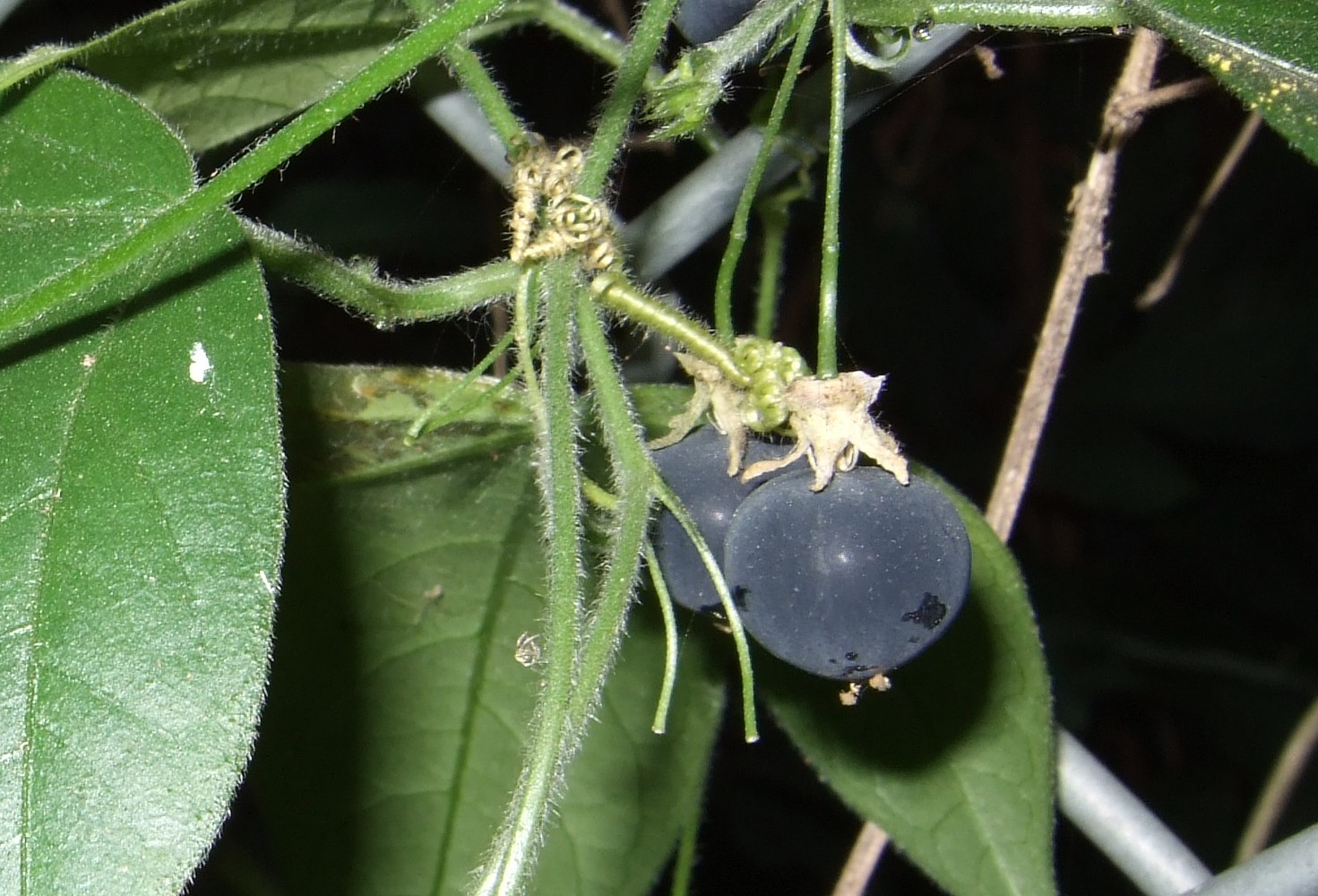
Fruit

It is a creeping or climbing perennial liana up to 6 meters long. It has suberous stems in its lower part, glabrous to puberulent.

The leaves are simple, alternate, entire to three-lobed, with both sides glabrous, shiny green. They are 4 to 12 centimeters long when elliptical and up to 5 cm long and 7 cm wide when deeply lobed, sharp lobes, base rounded to truncated, glabrous to puberulent; petioles 0.5–4 cm long, with a pair of conspicuous and stipitate glands in upper half; linear stipules.

The plant is known for the fact that the leaves on one and the same plant vary greatly in shape and size. Another well-known phenomenon is that the lower part of the trunk becomes corky with aging.

=== Flowers and fruit ===
The melliferous flowers are solitary or in pairs, and grow in the leaf axils. Greenish or yellowish in color, they have 5 lanceolate sepals, but no petals. Flowering takes place from late summer to late winter.

The inedible fruit is not hardy and transitions from green to indigo, purple and, lastly, black as it ripens. The glabrous fruits contain a multitude of tiny seeds in a dark blue pulp, which are dispersed by birds.

(Not able to verify original reference(6). Forms .org/.edu reference this particular fruit as edible for people but may not have the best of flavor depending on ripeness.)

== Range ==
Its range stretches from Florida and the Lower Rio Grande Valley of Texas in the United States south through Mexico, Central America, and the Caribbean to South America. In 1909, it was introduced in Polynesia and Australia.

It is extremely prolific (up to 1000 seeds per square meter), smothering any vegetation it grows on, including trees. In New Caledonia, it is prohibited to introduce the species into the wild.

== Reproduction ==
Many clones of the plant are self-pollinating. In winter, the plant is hardy down to temperatures around 7 °C. It can be propagated by sowing or cuttings.

This species is a host plant for the caterpillars of the Gulf fritillary (Agraulis vanillae), Julia heliconian (Dryas iulia), Mexican silverspot (Dione moneta), red postman (Heliconius erato), and zebra heliconian (Heliconius charithonia). It is a larval host plant for the glasswing butterfly (Acraea andromacha) in Australia.
