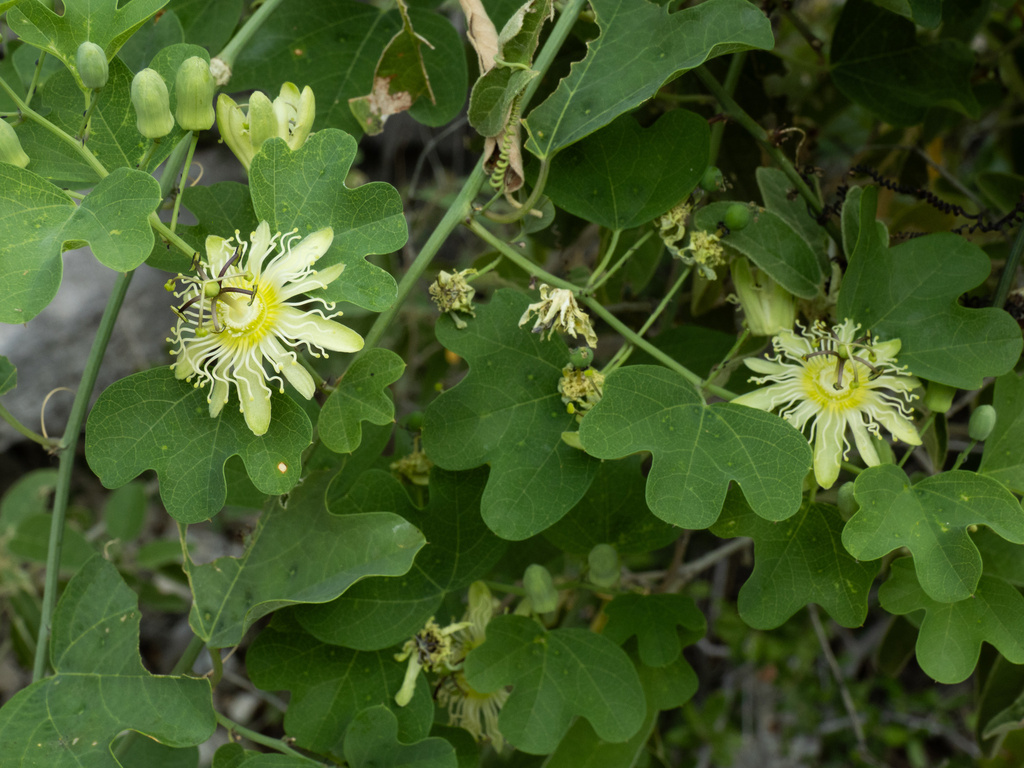

Conservation status
- Secure (NatureServe)

Scientific classification
- Kingdom: Plantae
- Clade: Embryophytes
- Clade: Tracheophytes
- Clade: Angiosperms
- Clade: Eudicots
- Clade: Rosids
- Order: Malpighiales
- Family: Passifloraceae
- Genus: Passiflora
- Species: P. affinis

Binomial name
- Passiflora affinis Engelm.

= Passiflora affinis =

Species of flowering plant

Passiflora affinis, the bracted passionflower, is a species of flowering perennial vine of Texas and northeast Mexico. The vine has three-lobed leaves and a small yellow-green bloom with delicate filaments arranged in a starburst. It is a larval host plant for several butterfly species.

== Description ==
Passiflora affinis is a perennial climbing vine that can reach up to 4.5 m (15 ft) in length. Leaves have two to three rounded lobes and are broader than they are long, typically measuring 6–10 cm (2.4–3.9 in) wide and 3–7 cm (1.2–2.8 in) long with a petiole of 3 cm (1.2 in).

Flowers grow singly or in pairs from the connection between petiole and stem. The flower is yellow-green overall and consists of 5 longer sepals alternating with 5 shorter petals underneath a disc of delicate filaments. P. affinis blooms July through August. The fruit is a purple-black berry.

== Range ==
Passiflora affinis is distributed across the Edwards Plateau geographic region of central Texas. It occurs in the following counties: Bandera, Bell, Bexar, Comal, Edwards, Fayette, Gillespie, Hays, Kerr, Kimble, Kinney, Llano, Sutton, Travis, Uvalde, and Val Verde. It is also found in northeast Mexico.

== Habitat ==
Passiflora affinis grows in the limestone soils common to the Edward's Plateau and prefers sun or partial shade.

== Ecology ==
Like other central Texas passionflower vines, Passiflora affinis is a larval host plant for the Gulf Fritillary and the Zebra Longwing. The caterpillars may completely defoliate the vine but if a plant is well established it is capable of growing back.
