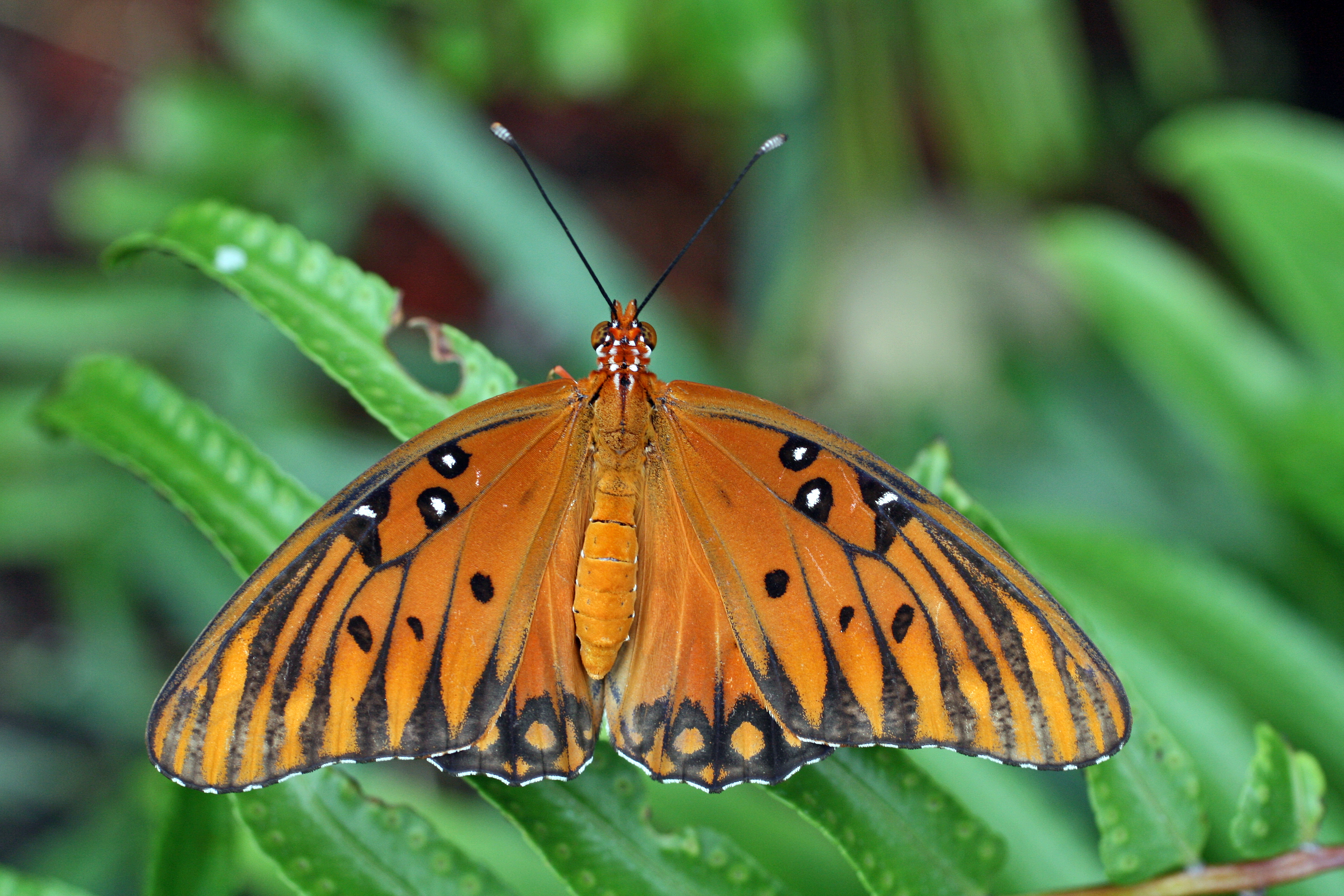
- Dorsal view
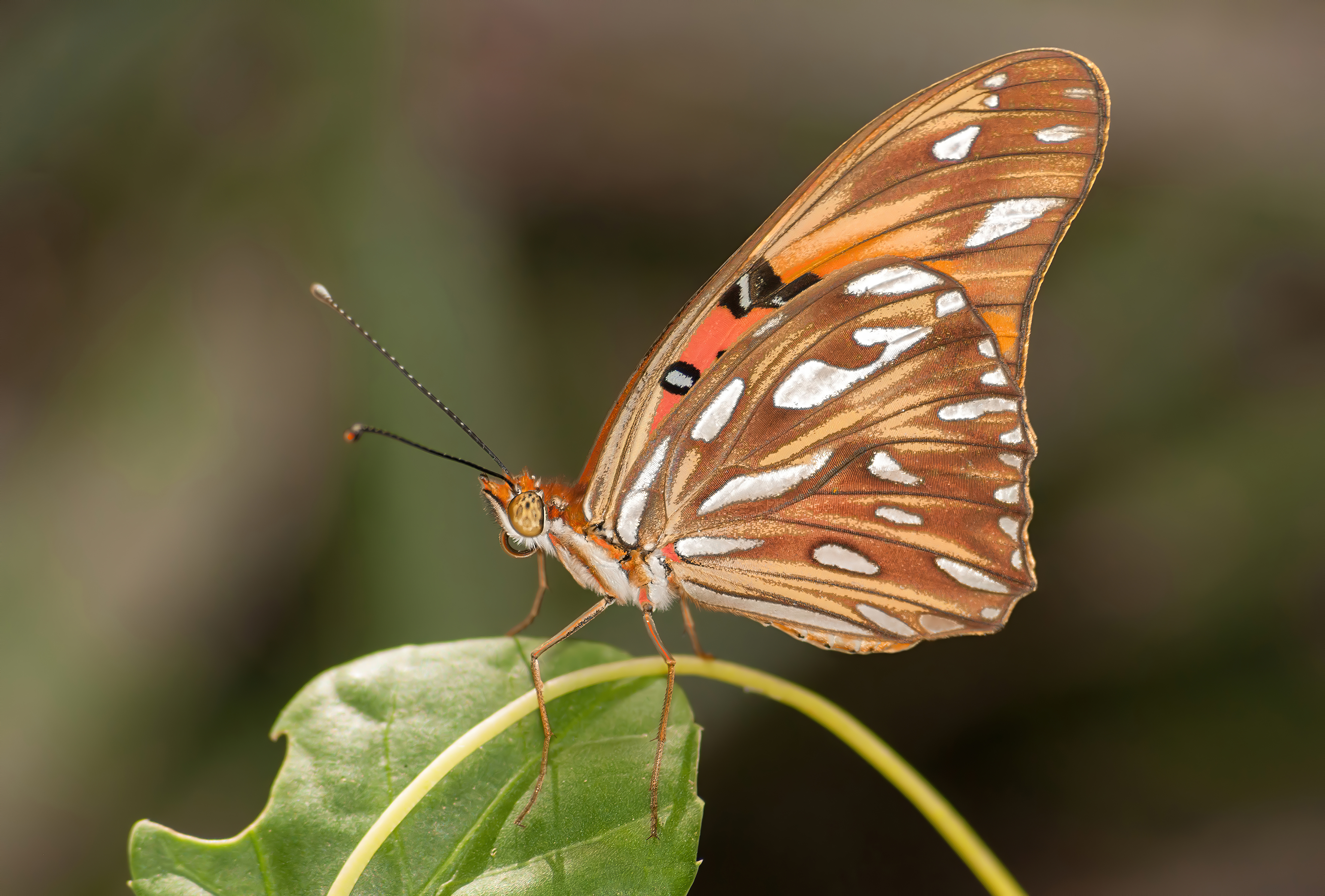
- Ventral view

Conservation status
- Secure (NatureServe)

Scientific classification
- Kingdom: Animalia
- Phylum: Arthropoda
- Clade: Pancrustacea
- Class: Insecta
- Order: Lepidoptera
- Family: Nymphalidae
- Subfamily: Heliconiinae
- Genus: Agraulis; Hübner, [1819]
- Species: A. vanillae

Binomial name
- Agraulis vanillae (Linnaeus, 1758)

Synonyms
- Papilio vanillae Linnaeus, 1758; Dione vanillae (Linnaeus, 1758)

= Gulf fritillary =

Sole species in brush-footed butterfly genus Agraulis

The Gulf fritillary or passion butterfly (Dione vanillae or Agraulis vanillae in other taxonomies) is a bright orange butterfly in the subfamily Heliconiinae of the family Nymphalidae. That subfamily was formerly set apart as a separate family, the Heliconiidae. The Heliconiinae are "longwing butterflies", which have long, narrow wings compared to other butterflies.

Dione vanillae is most commonly found in the southern areas of the United States, specifically in many regions of Florida and Texas.

Gulf fritillaries have a chemical defense mechanism in which they release odorous chemicals in response to predator sightings. As a result, common predators learn to avoid this species. Pheromones play a critical role in male-female courtship behaviors, with male gulf fritillaries emitting sex pheromones that contribute to mate choice in females.

The scientific name Papilio vanillae was given to the gulf fritillary by Carl Linnaeus in 1758, based on a 1705 painting by Maria Sibylla Merian (The Metamorphosis of the Insects of Surinam, Plate XXV), which shows the adult and caterpillar of the gulf fritillary on a vanilla orchid, Vanilla planifolia. However, it is now known that the gulf fritillary caterpillar does not use the vanilla plant. The species was moved to the genus Agraulis in 1835 by Boisduval & Le Conte. A phylogenetic analysis reported in 2019 placed Agraulis as a sub-genus of Dione.

== Description ==
In its adult form, the gulf fritillary is a medium-sized butterfly that has extended forewings and a wingspan range of 6.5 to 9.5 cm. This butterfly exhibits sexual dimorphism as females are typically distinctively larger in size than males. The underside of the wings is brown and speckled with silvery white dots. In contrast, the top surface layer of the wings is deep orange in color with black streaks running across. In addition to the size difference between the two sexes, females are usually darker in color and are more marked with black streaks as compared to the males.

== Geographic range ==
Gulf fritillaries are found from the southernmost United States (Florida and Georgia to Texas and California), and throughout the Americas as far south as Argentina. They have also been introduced to Hawaii.

== Habitat ==
Gulf fritillaries are found in open habitats, like in moderately sunny areas near open grasslands, parks, and woodlands. Gulf fritillaries are also commonly seen in local butterfly gardens across the U.S.

== Host plants ==
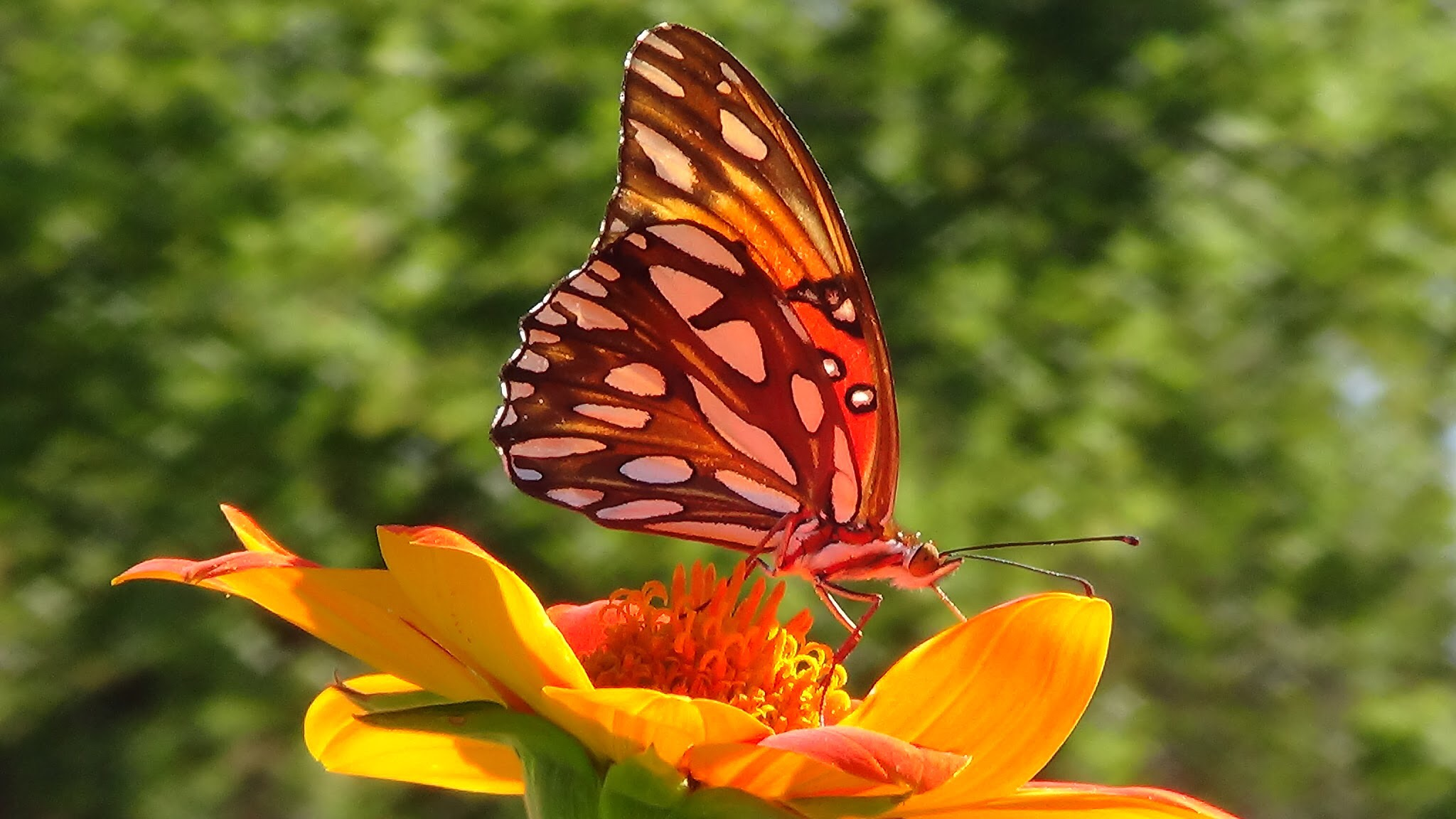
Gulf fritillary butterfly feeding on nectar from Mexican sunflower

The caterpillar food plants--also called the host plants--for gulf fritillaries are members of the genus Passiflora. The adult butterflies use nectar from many flowers, including Lantana plants. The Passiflora host plants are frequently called passion vines; in some Texan counties where this butterfly's population is high, gulf fritillaries will feed on specific species such as Passiflora lutea and Passiflora affinis. These passion vine plants are suitable host plants as they provide a good structure for larval host habitats which enables young populations of gulf fritillaries to be sufficiently nurtured and protected. The role of host plants is also integral to the oviposition of gulf fritillaries, as the female butterflies lay their eggs on or near the host plant.

== Propagation ==
=== Oviposition ===
The process of oviposition in gulf fritillaries begins with the female butterfly flying low and slightly above the vegetation (most likely the typical host plants like Passiflora incarnata or Passiflora lutea) and lasts until the female pauses above an individual plant. Then, the female makes contact with the host plant by landing; the female then deposits an egg to complete the process of oviposition. The driving factor behind what causes the female to oviposit on or near the host plant is most likely due to the certain chemical composition of the specific genus of the host plant. Once the female recognizes the chemical composition (by using the antennae), the female will oviposit.

== Life cycle ==
=== Egg ===
Eggs are small and spherically shaped; the female gulf fritillary lays the eggs individually one by one on or near the host plant. Typical host plants include several species of the genus Passiflora. The eggs are initially yellow in color after deposition by the female, and they gradually turn a brownish red color over the course of the next 24 hours. The average duration of the egg stage in the life cycle for gulf fritillaries is roughly between three and five days depending on the temperature of the environment. Eggs are usually found on the upper surfaces of the leaves of the host plant, but some can be found on the underside of leaves as well.

=== Larva ===
Life cycle

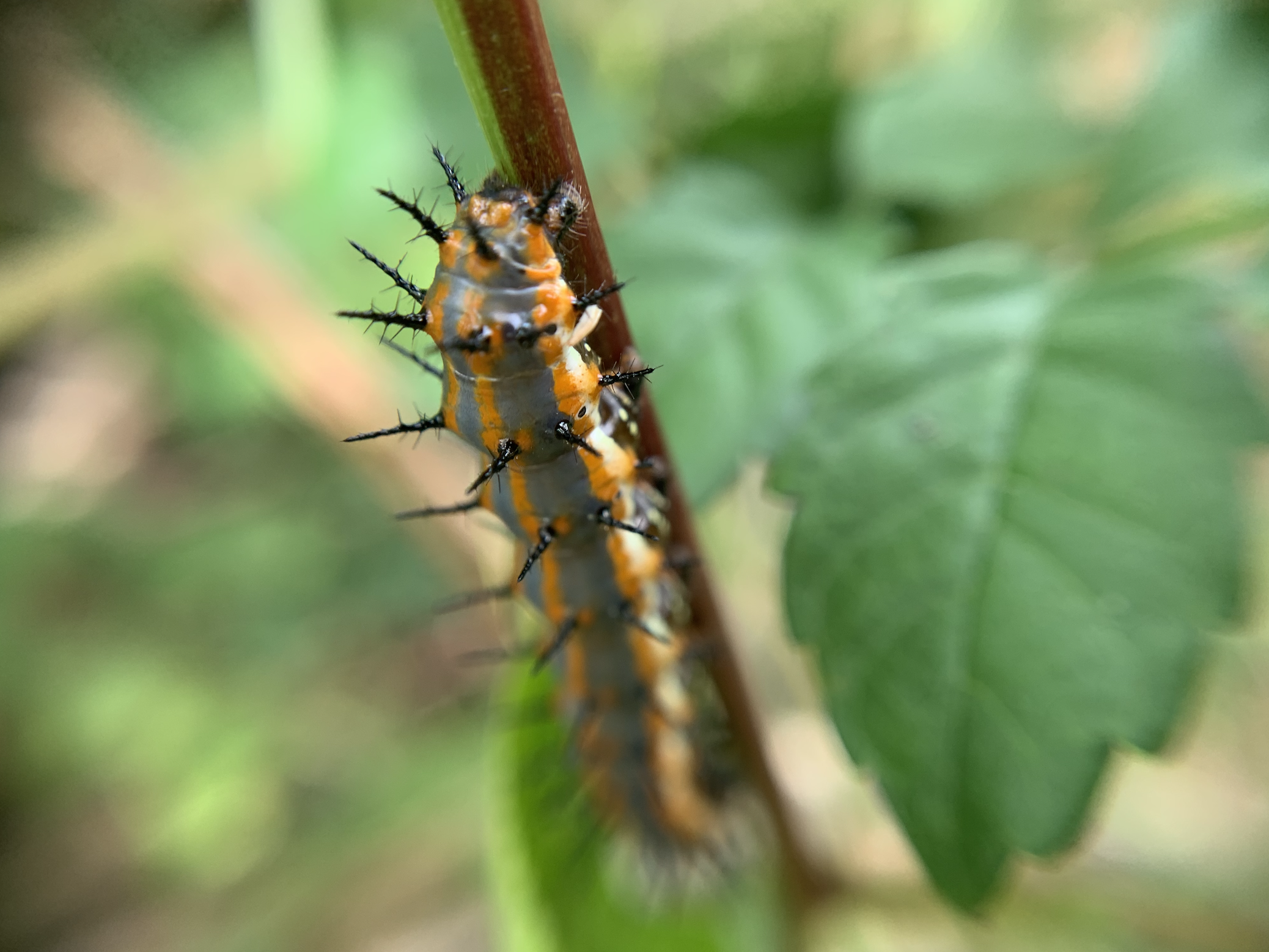
Despite being covered in spikes, gulf fritillary larvae are not a stinging caterpillar. The spikes are soft to the touch and serve the purpose of scaring predators.

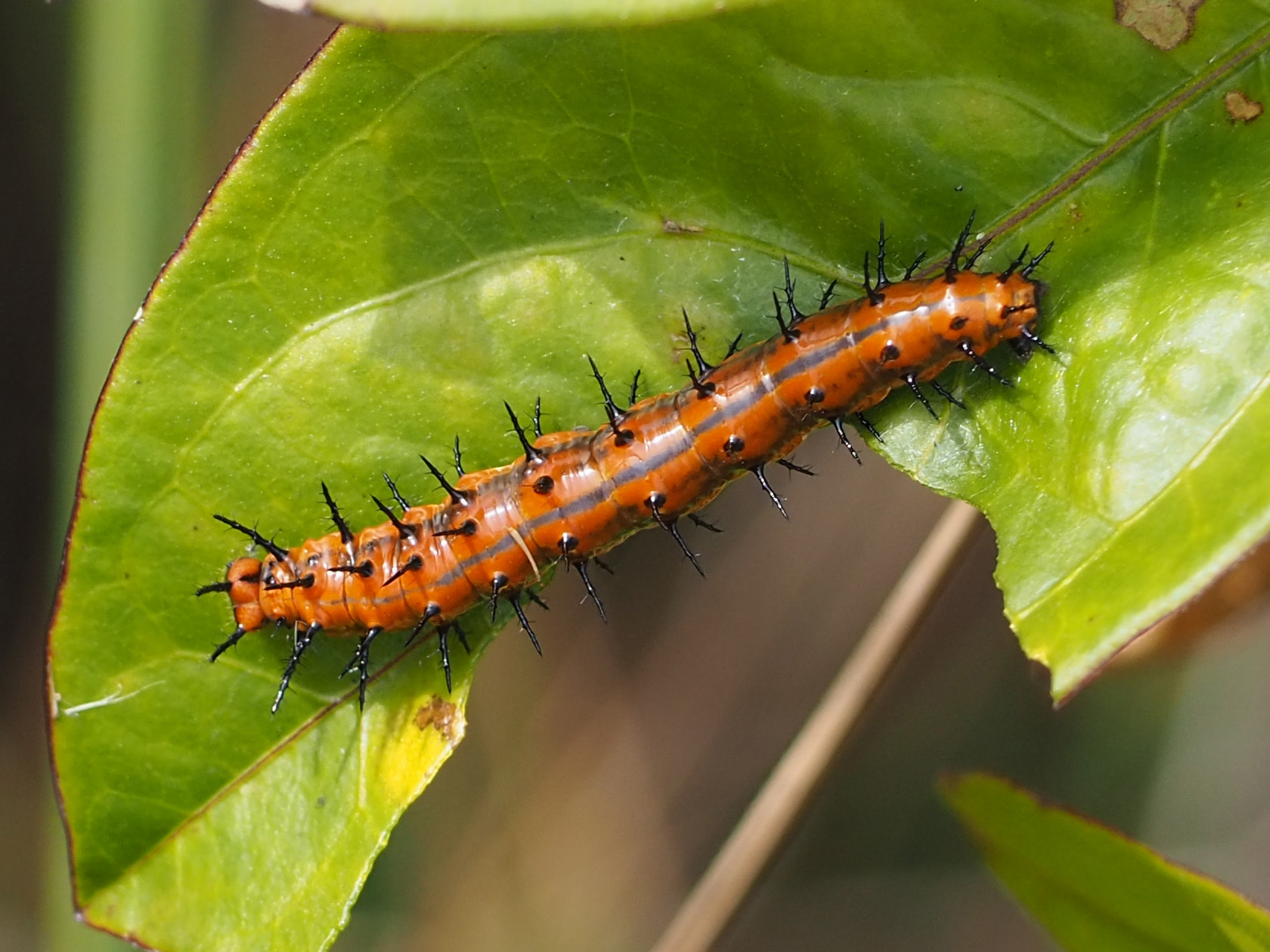
Gulf Fritillary caterpillar, Florida, January 2021

In appearance, the larvae are dark orange with small black spines protruding outward from the body. The larval stages of gulf fritillaries include five instars, each with a varying timeframe. After the eggs hatch, the new larvae eat the egg casings for food. Eventually, the larvae will transition either to consuming other eggs or parts of the host plant for nourishment. Throughout the first three instar stages, the larvae primarily consume the leaves and feed away from the leaf margins of the host plant. How much of the leaf and how deep into the layers the larva will eat depend on the type (i.e. thickness or thinness) of the leaf in question. Throughout the last two instar stages, the larvae mainly consume the leaves and feed at the leaf margins. Throughout this food acquisition process, the degree to which a specific leaf is eaten before it is abandoned in favor of another newer leaf largely depends on whether food is in plentiful or scarce supply. The average duration of the larval stage is between 11 and 16 days depending on the temperature.

=== Pupa ===
In form and appearance, the pupae of gulf fritillaries are not recognizably uniform, but rather can vary in both coloring and physical size. The average duration of the pupal stage in gulf fritillaries is roughly between 7 and 12 days depending on the temperature of the environment. Colder temperatures are associated with a longer time frame whereas warmer temperatures are associated with a shorter time for pupal development.

=== Metamorphosis ===
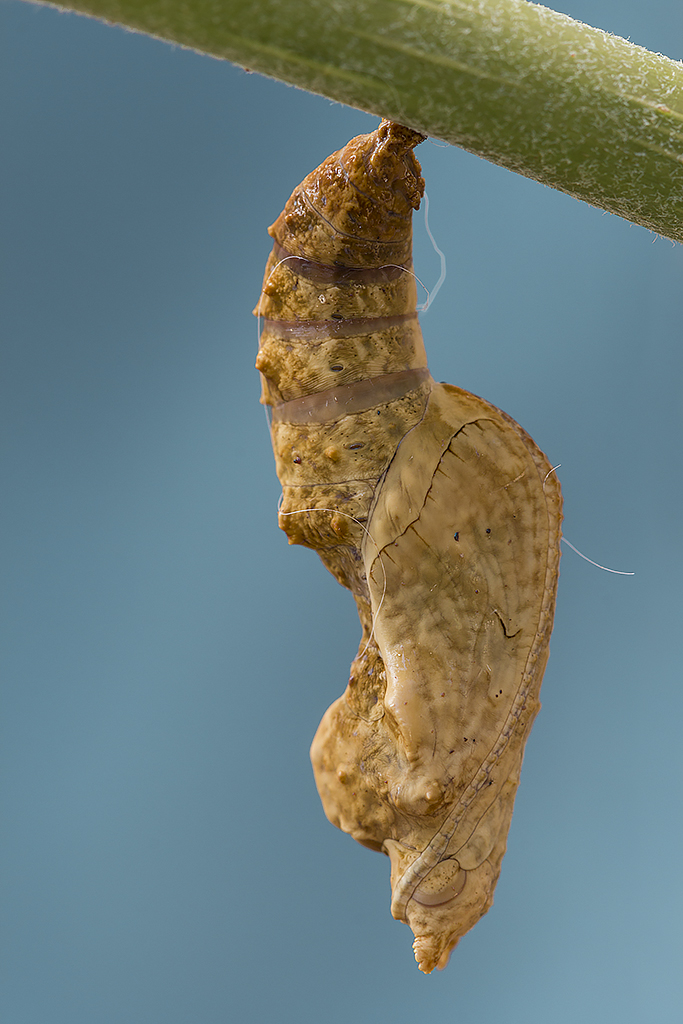
Chrysalis

When the time comes for the caterpillar to create its chrysalis it turns a grayish color and begins to spin a silk-like substance into a ball on top or against a malleable surface. It then attaches its rear end to the "silk" lump and hangs upside down in a "j" position. By small contractions of the muscles it begins to shed its skin and head revealing a soft pinkish tan form. Quickly the soft form hardens and becomes grayish brown. The chrysalis stays in this form for eleven to twenty-one days. After that period of time, a small crack begins to form at the tip of the chrysalis revealing the butterfly's head. It continues to slowly move down through the bottom of the chrysalis until its legs are free to cling onto the shell of the chrysalis and pull itself the rest of the way out. Much like the monarch butterfly, it begins to pump the fluids from its bulging abdomen into its shriveled wings. When its wings are fully expanded it releases excess fluids from its abdomen. For the next ten to fifteen minutes it stays still and allows its wings to dry. Finally it fans its wings out and takes flight.

=== Adult ===
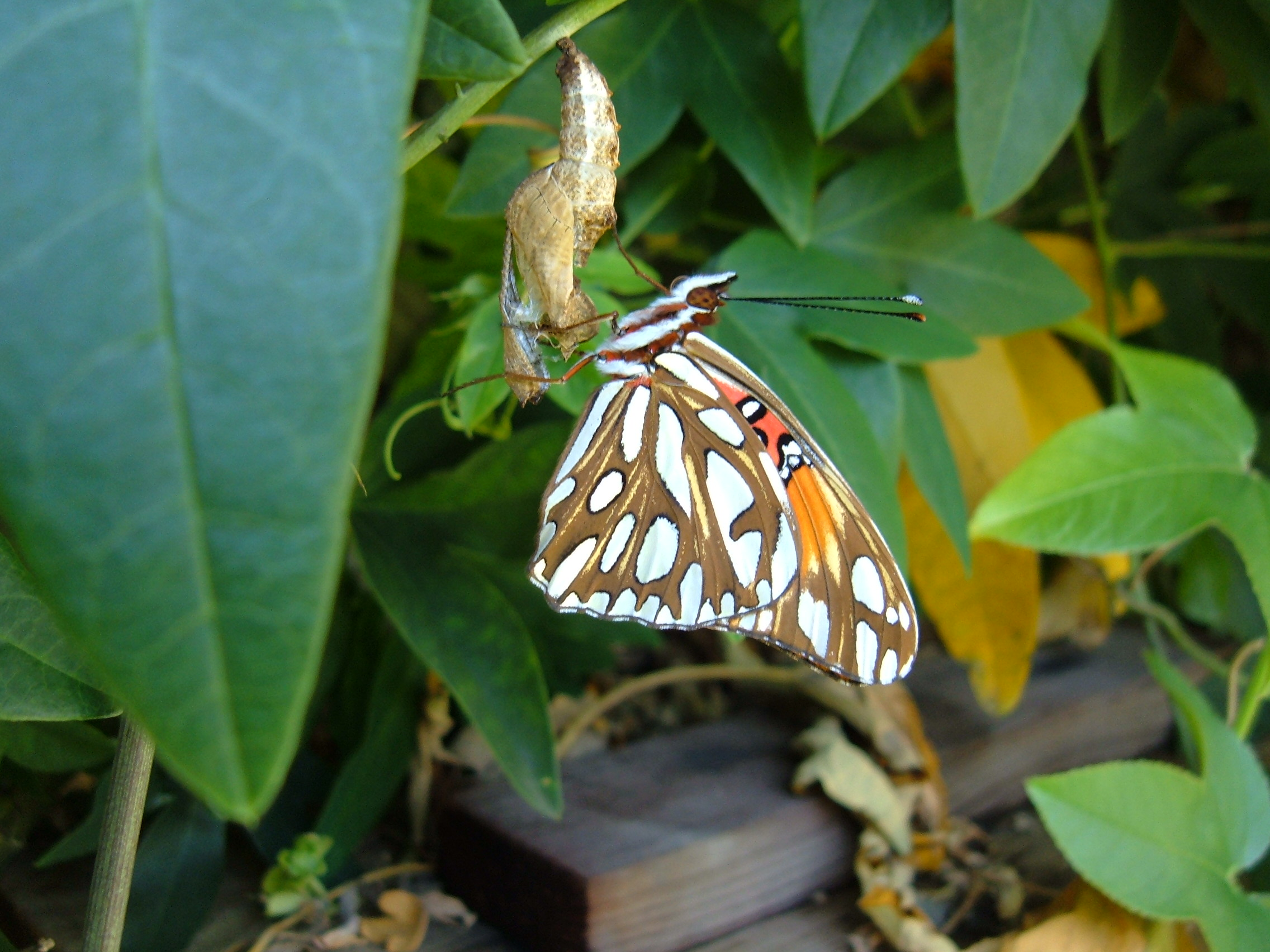
Minutes after emerging from chrysalis

After the process of emerging from the chrysalis is completed, the butterfly dries its wings and eventually flies for the first time. In the adult population, the approximate sex ratio between males to females is roughly one to one, but further observational studies of gulf fritillaries are needed to better support the hypothesis of an equal sex ratio between the two dimorphic sexes. The average duration of the adult stage is roughly 14 to 27 days after the butterfly emerges from the chrysalis depending on the quality of the environment (i.e. factor in the availability of food, the presence of predators, competition between individuals).

== Migration ==
With Florida constituting a major component of the geographic range of this butterfly, the migration pattern of gulf fritillaries in Florida is well-documented. In Florida, gulf fritillaries have two major flights during the year. The first major migration involves huge populations of butterflies flying northward while the second migration involves the butterflies moving southward throughout the state, especially throughout the peninsular parts of Florida. The first and second migrations occur in the spring and the fall, respectively.

== Defense against predators ==
Both male and female gulf fritillaries possess certain defensive glands located on their abdomens that serve as a defense mechanism against predators, especially avian predators such as birds. When the butterflies sense danger in the area or are suddenly disturbed, these glands emit a distinct and obvious odor which is composed of several different types of chemicals, such as 6-methyl-5-hepten-2-one and hexadecyl acetate. The summation of these chemical compounds released from the glands leads to birds preferentially avoiding the gulf fritillaries in favor of other prey. In some cases, gulf fritillaries can sometimes be subjected to competition and fighting from other butterfly species, such as Heliconius charithonia vazquezae and Dryas iulia moderata when those species have breeding populations in similar areas and within the same geographic range.

== Mating ==
=== Courtship behavior ===
The general process for a typical courtship interaction begins when a male flies and lands near a perching female, who is most likely perched on a host plant, such as several species of the Passiflora genus. Once the male has landed, the male assumes a position next to the female with their heads together and with their bodies aligned at a 45-degree angle. At this time, the male engages in a specific action called the wing clap display in which the male continuously claps its wings open and closed. During this time, the antennae of the female are placed between the opening and closing wings. After the male ceases wing movement, the male butterfly will move into a position that facilitates genital contact with the female. The average duration of the copulation process including the wing clap display is approximately 11 seconds.

=== Female and male interactions ===
==== Pheromones ====
The release of pheromones by the male gulf fritillaries plays a critical role in the mating and courtship process. Studies have shown that the males possess specific structures on their dorsal wings that engage in the production and eventual release of chemical pheromones. It is likely that pores that exist on the wings of the male butterflies transport the pheromones to the surface where the chemicals can be released and can then affect the females. The use of pheromones in the mating process relates to the idea of mate choice.

==== Nuptial gifts ====
Along with chemical pheromones, the presence of nuptial gifts plays an important role in the mating and courtship process. During the physical act of copulation, males transfer nutritious materials to the females. These extra nutrients given to the females can be used by a female to her advantage during the process of oogenesis. The use of nuptial gifts in the mating process, especially when females mate with multiple males, relates to the idea of female choice in deciding egg fertilization.

== Gallery ==
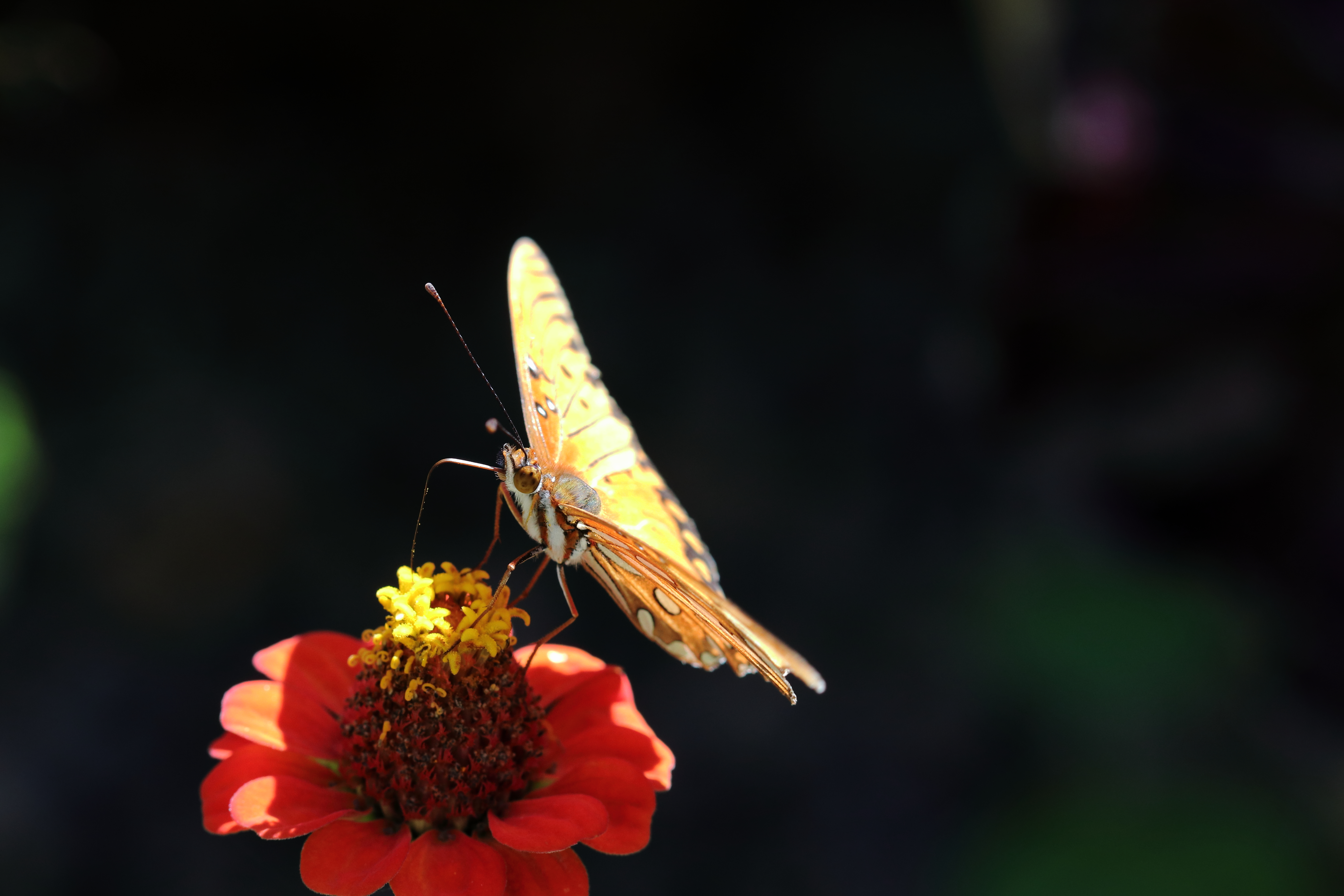
Feeding using its proboscis

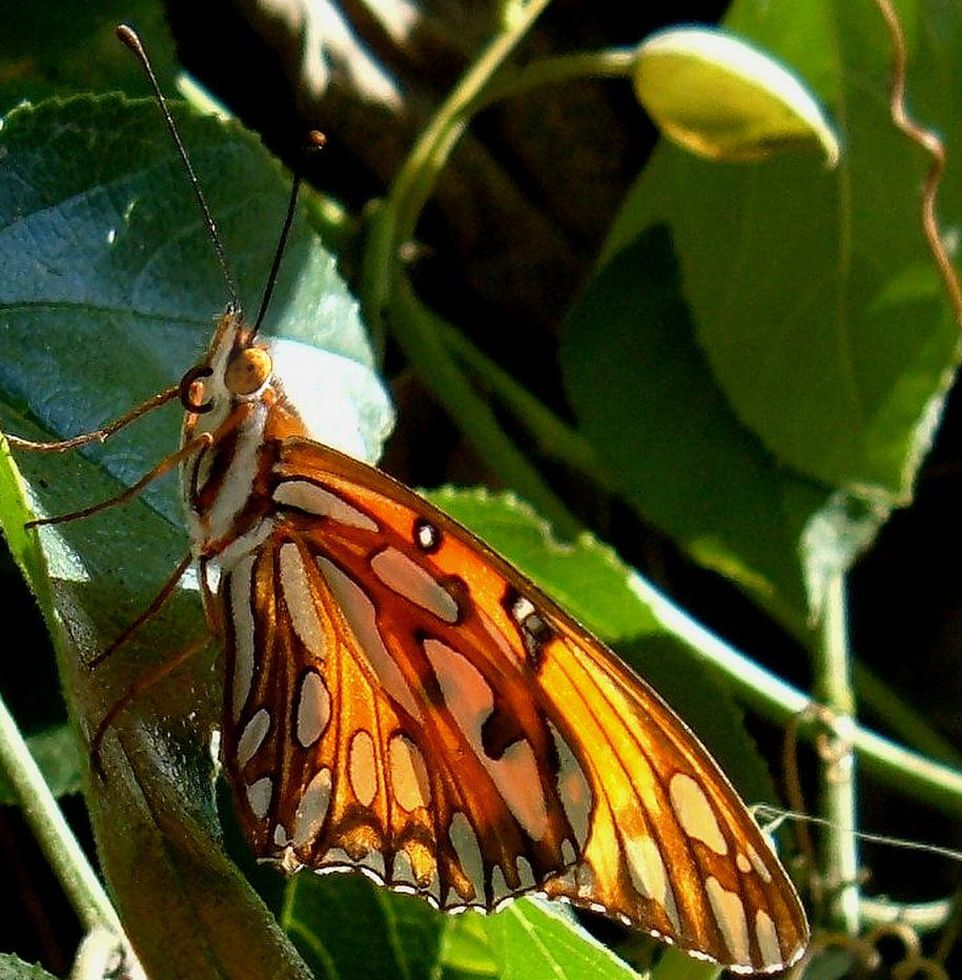
Profile of wings in sunlight

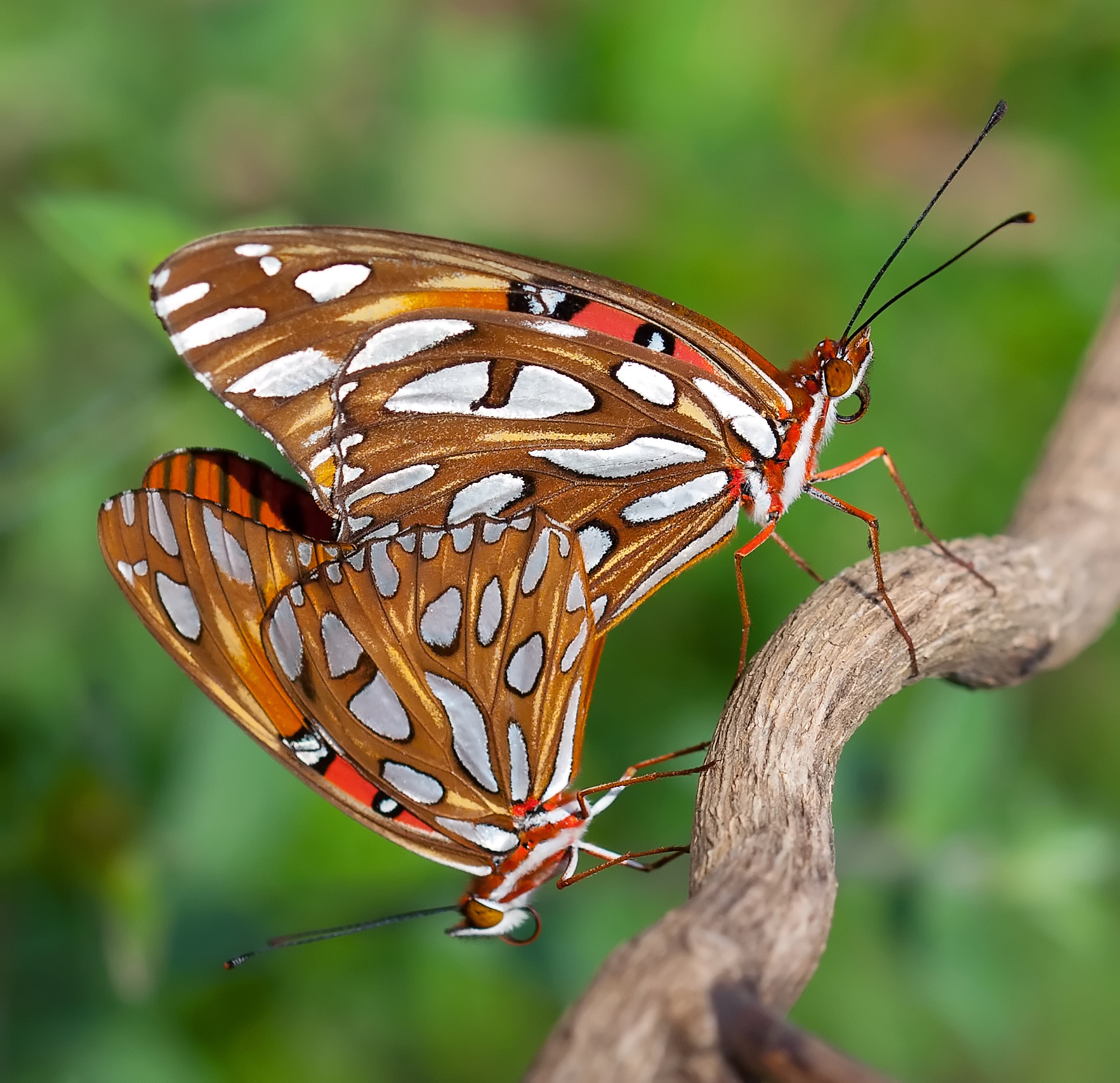
Fritillaries mating

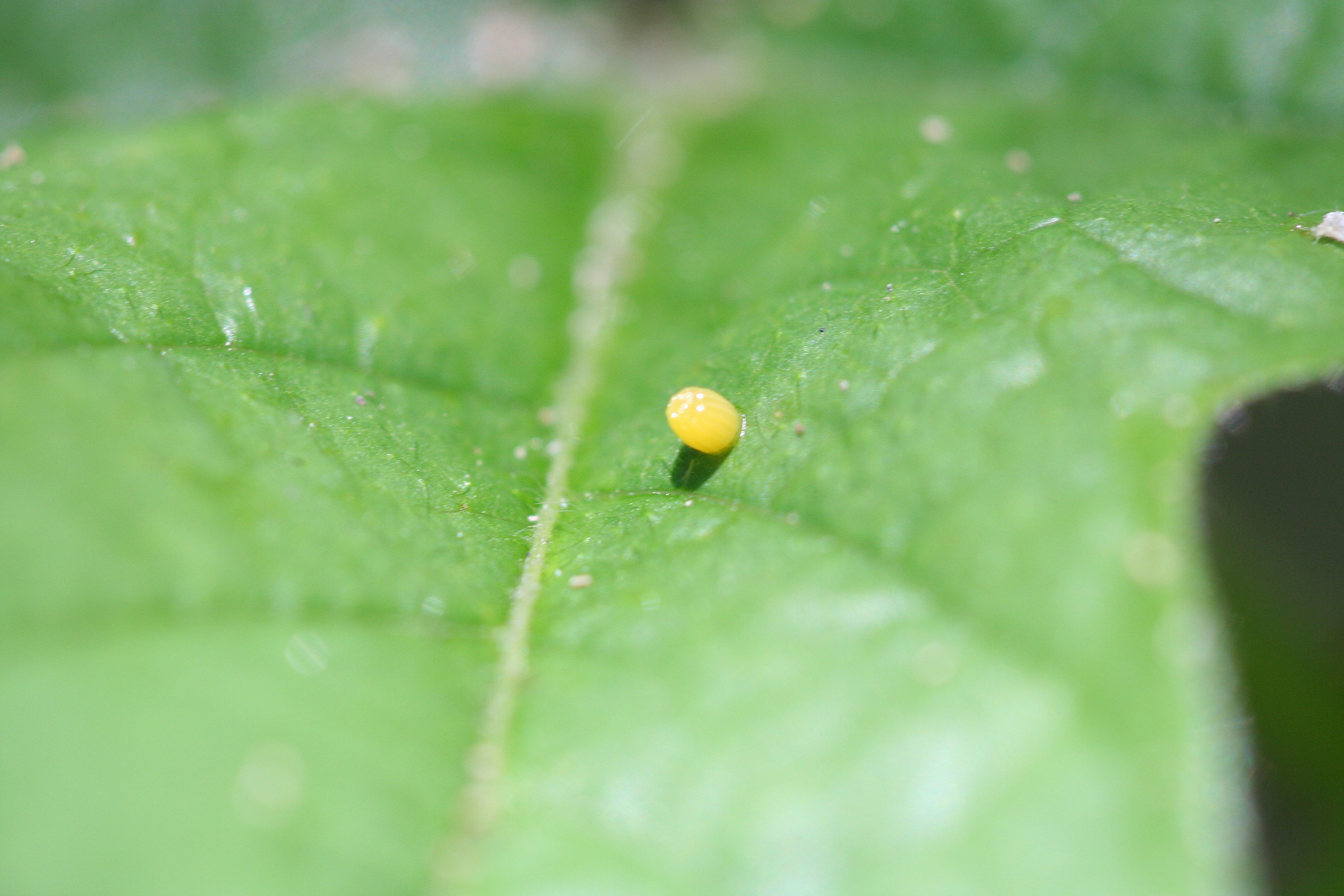
Egg

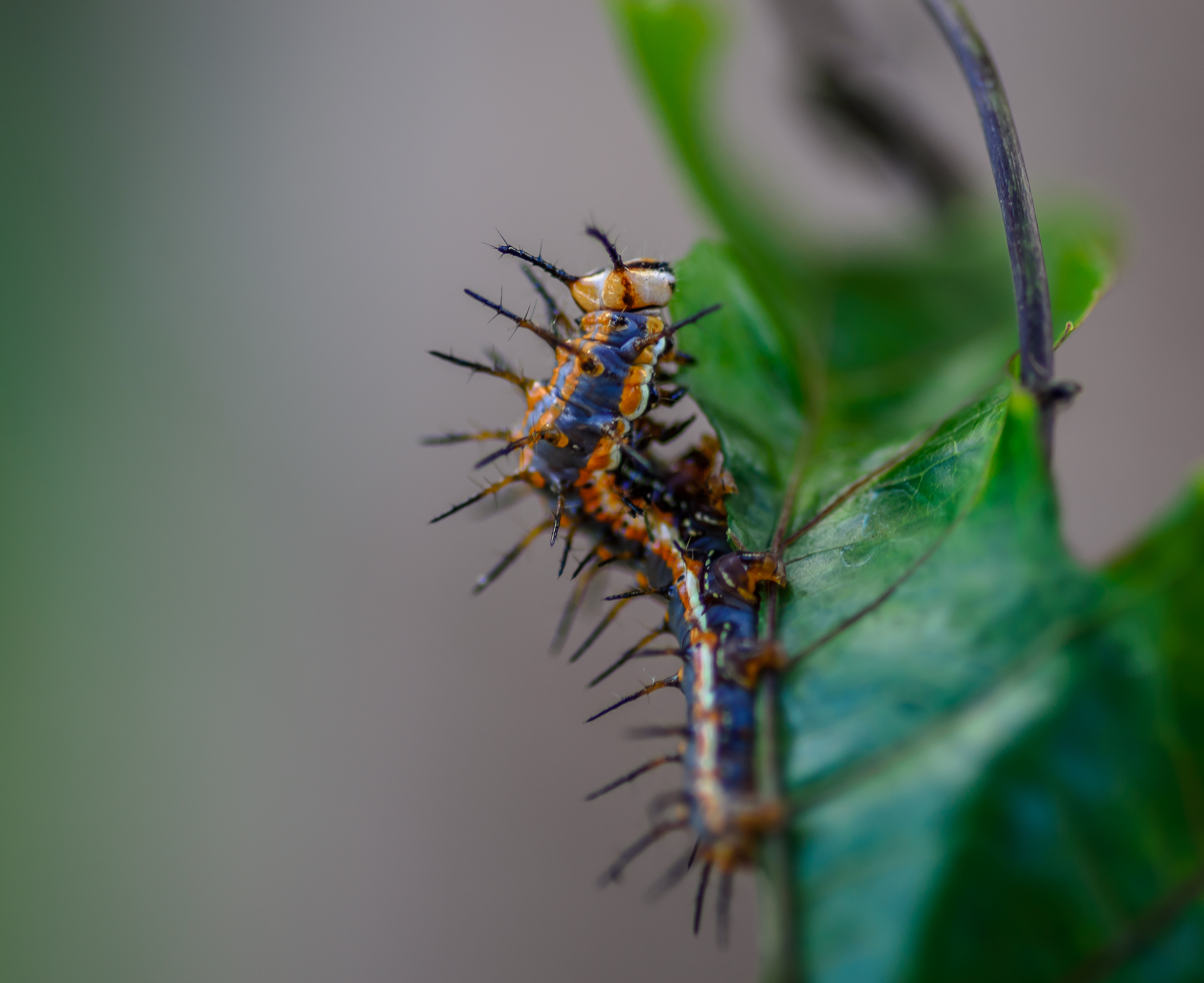
Caterpillar

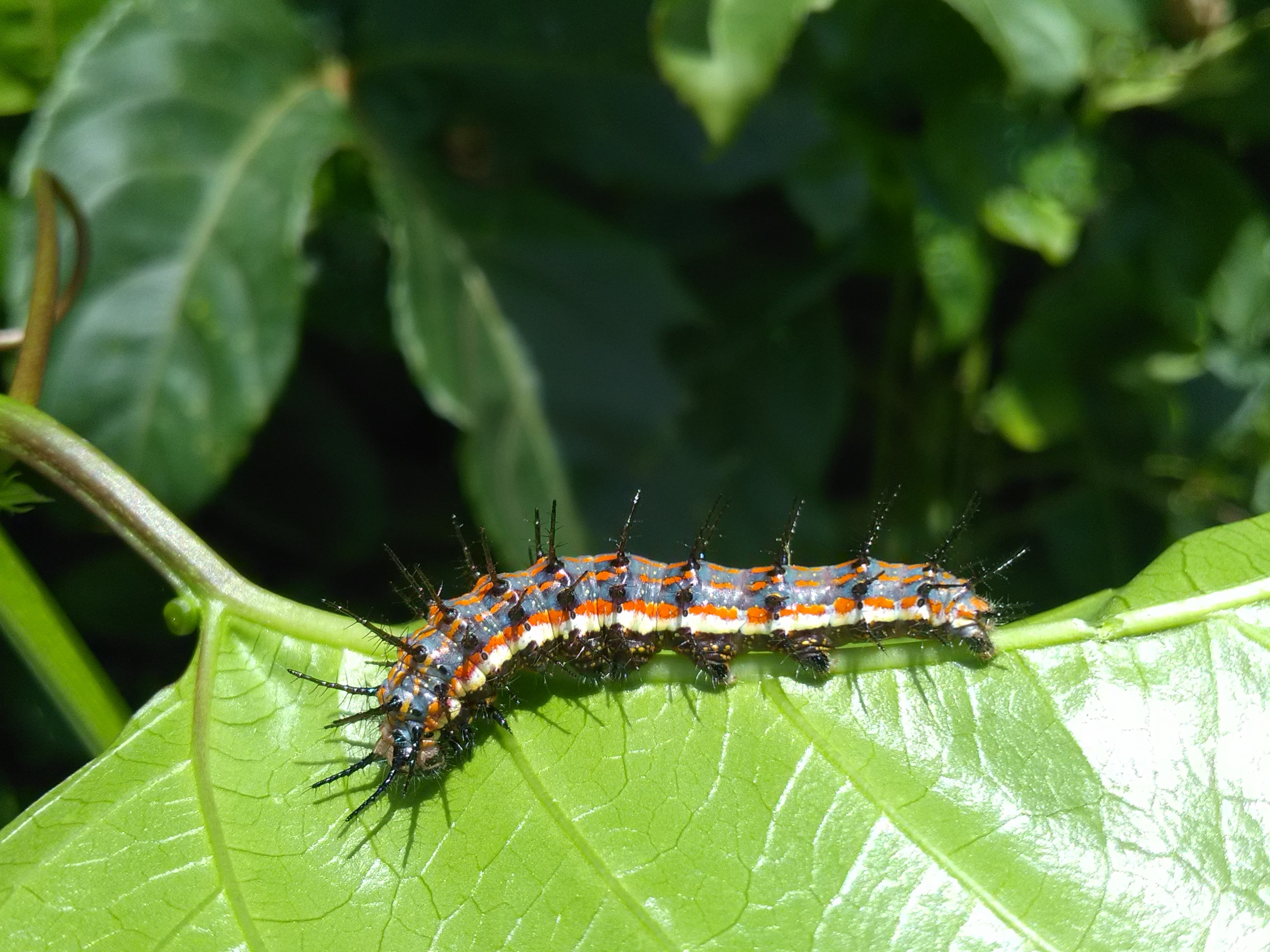

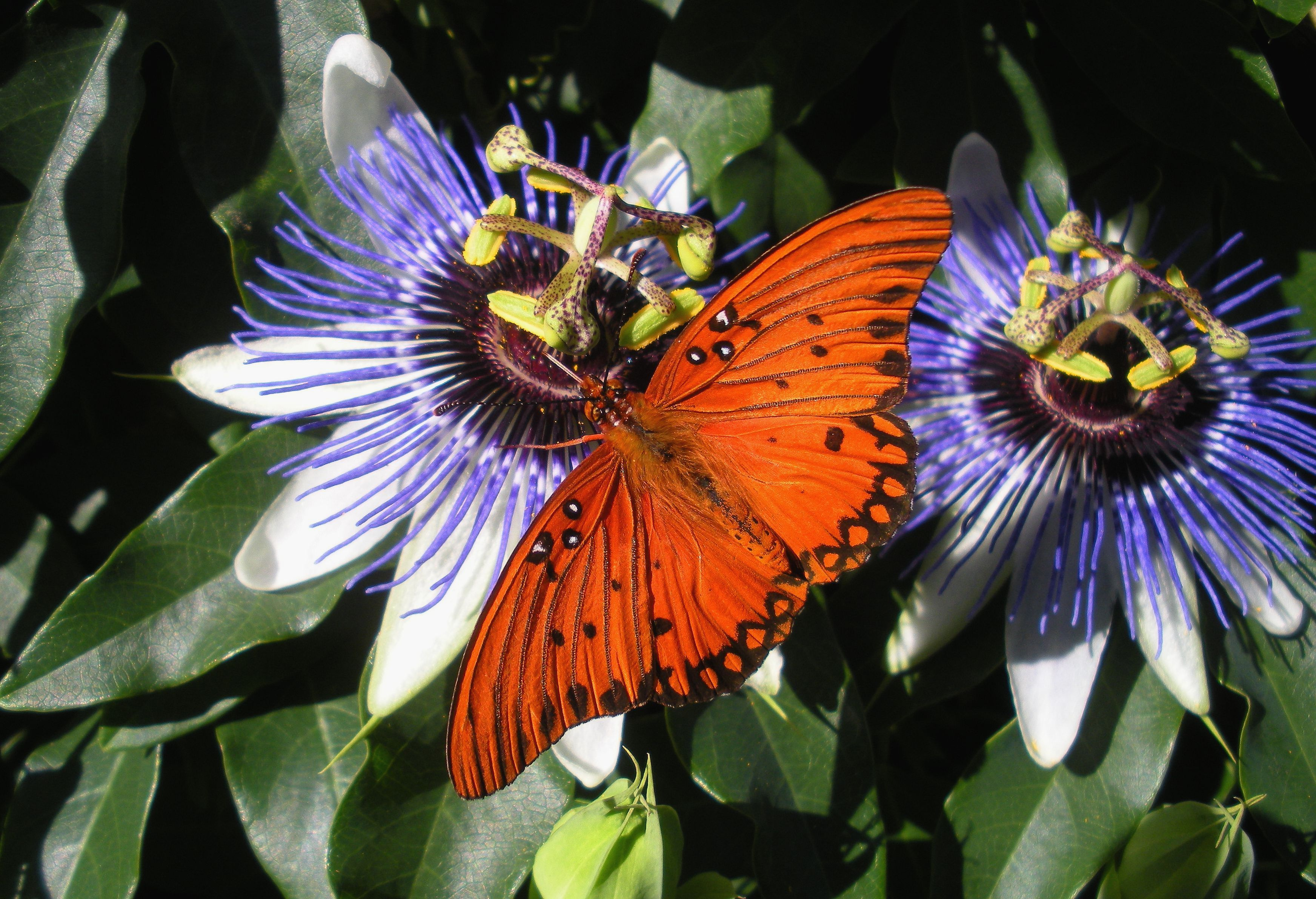
Fritillary feeding on nectar from passion flower

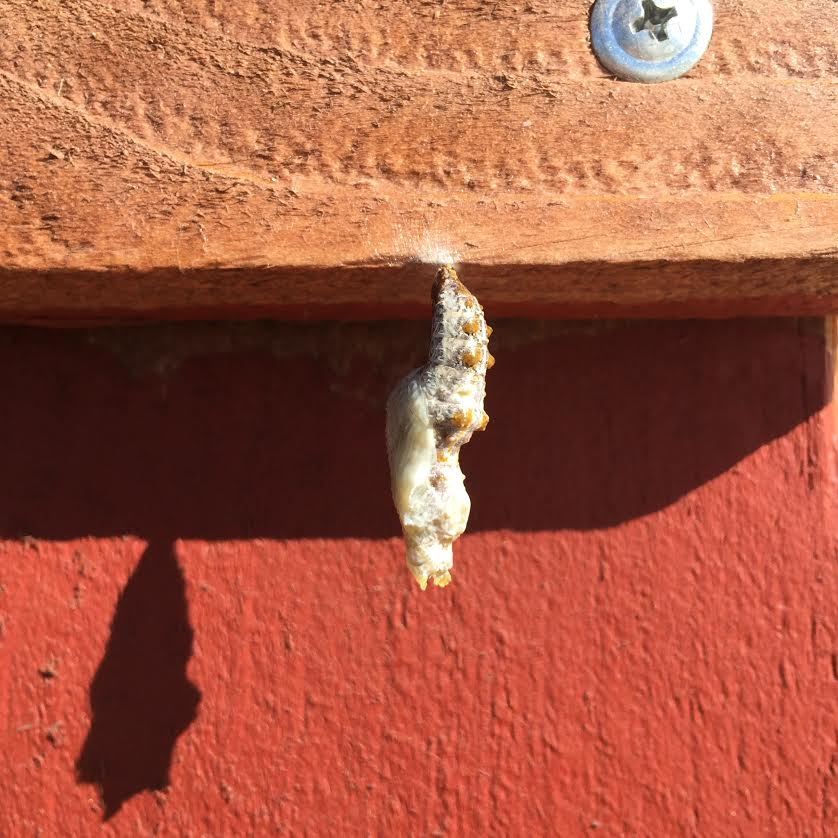
Agraulis vanillae in its chrysalis form, seen in Inglewood, California

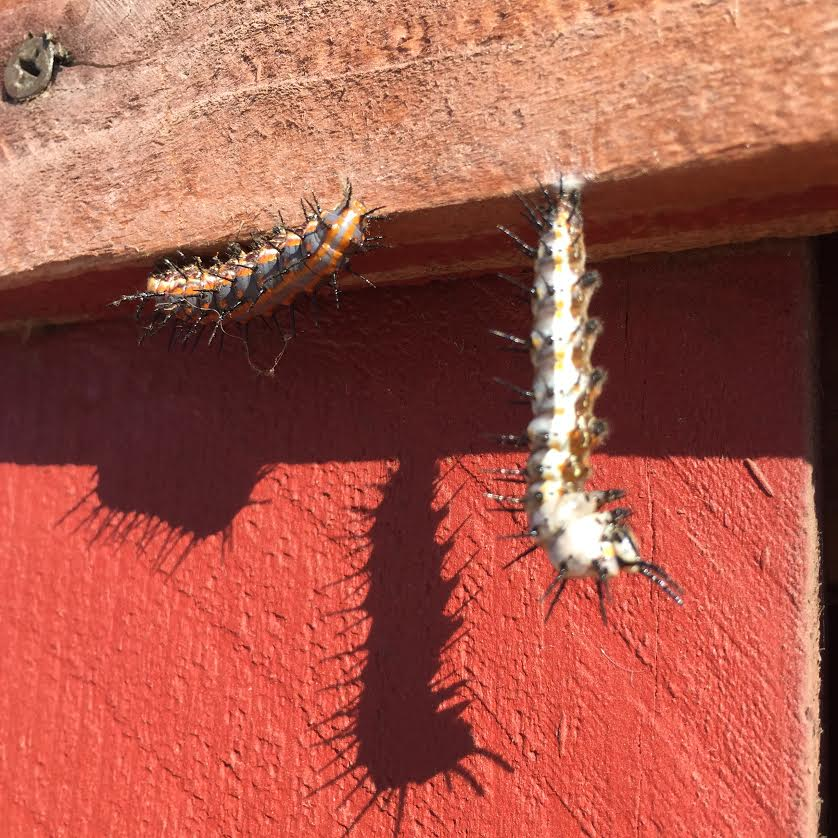
Agraulis vanillae larvae preparing for their metamorphoses

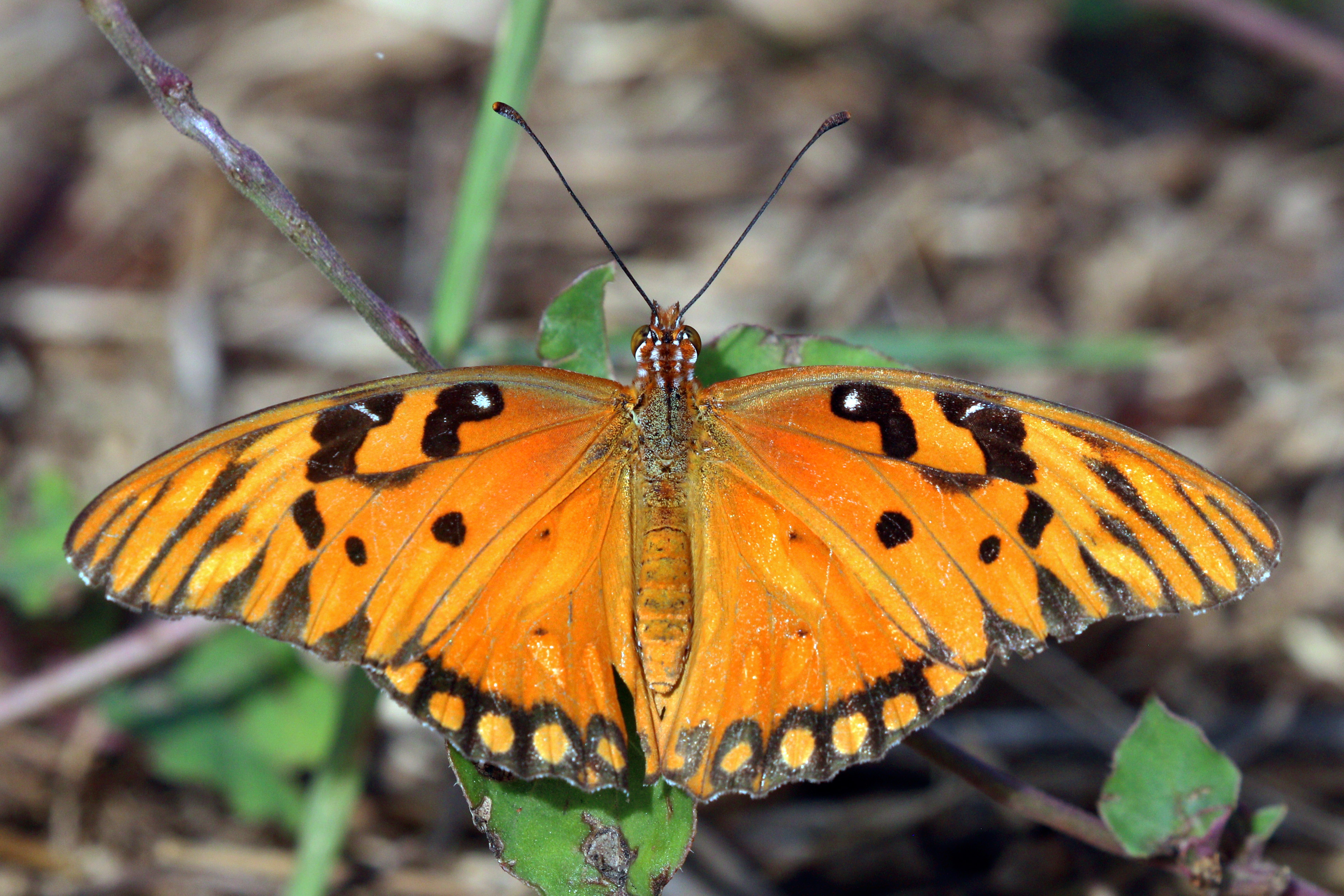
A. v. insularis Grand Cayman

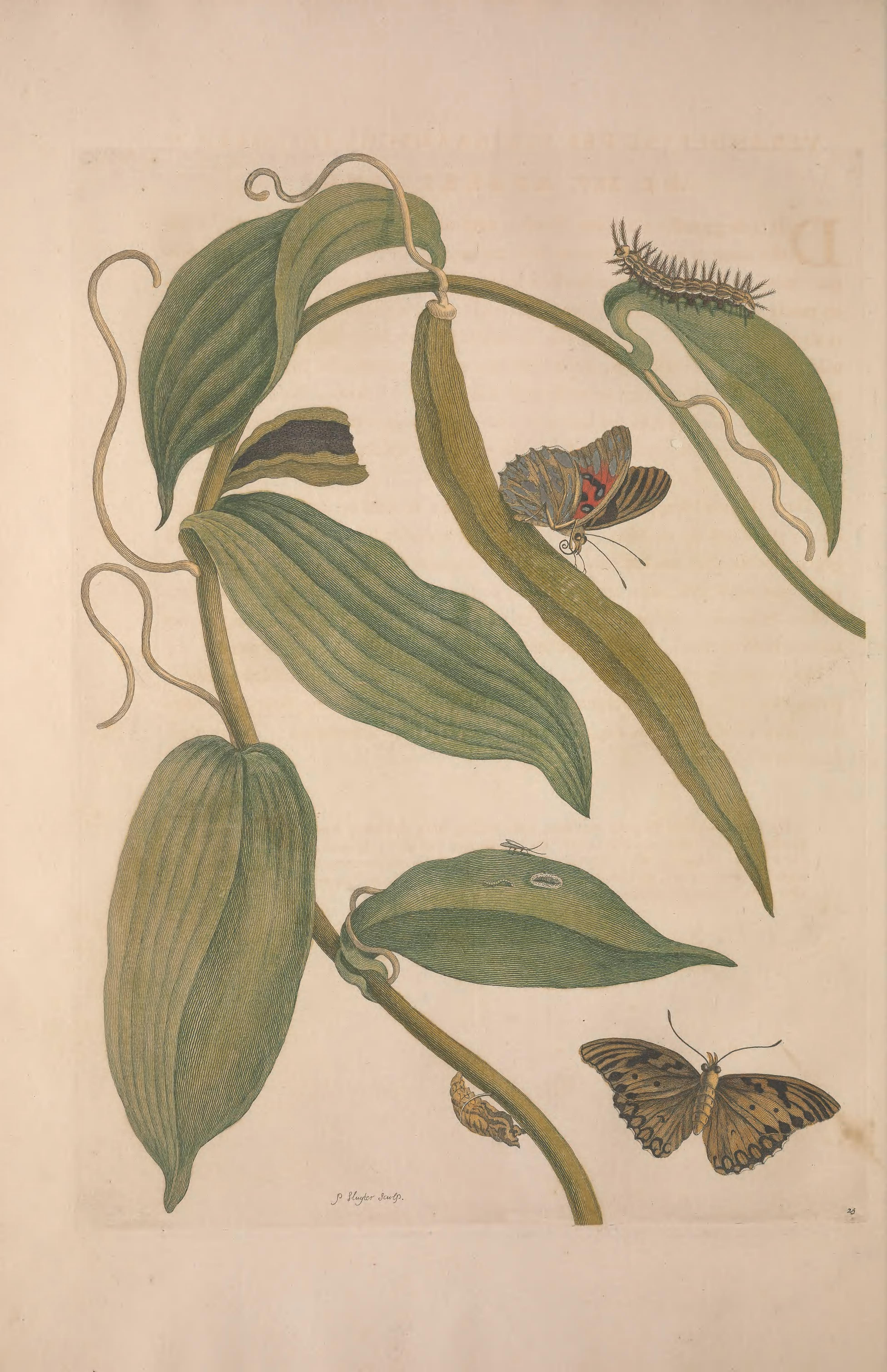
Plate XXV in Maria Sibylla Merian's Metamorphosis insectorum surinamensium

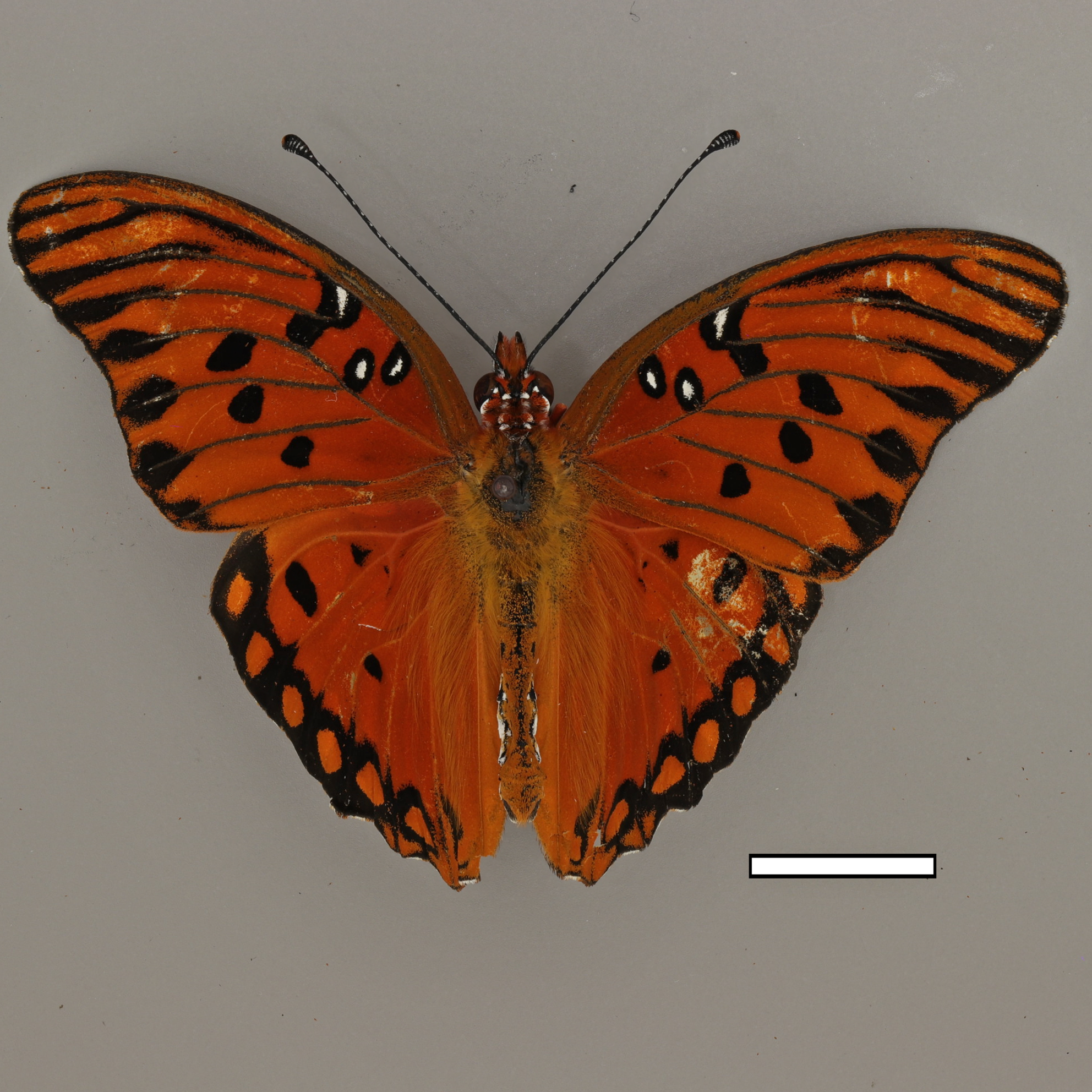
Pinned D. vanillae from Central GA (scale bar: 1 cm)
