= Montana (disambiguation) =

Montana is the 41st state of the United States.

Montana may also refer to:

== Arts, entertainment and media ==
=== Film ===
- Montana (1950 film), an American western starring Errol Flynn
- Montana (1990 film), an American western
- Montana (1998 film), an American crime drama
- Montana (2014 film), a British film by Mo Ali
- Montana (2017 film), an Israeli film by Limor Shmila

=== Music ===
- Montana (band), an Australian indie pop band
- Montana of 300, American rapper
- Montana (album), by French Montana, 2019
- Montana: A Love Story, by George Winston, 2004
- "Montana" (state song), from 1945
  - "Montana", a song by John Linnell from the 1999 album State Songs
- "Montana" (Frank Zappa song), 1973
- "Montana", a song by Youth Lagoon from the 2011 album The Year of Hibernation
- "Montana", a song by Justin Timberlake from the 2018 album Man of the Woods
- "Montana", a song by Owl City from the 2018 album Cinematic

=== Publications ===
- La Montaña, an Argentine socialist publication published in 1897
- Montana (journal), a quarterly journal published by the Montana Historical Society

=== Other uses in arts, entertainment and media ===
- Montana (solitaire), a group of Patience games

== Businesses and organisations ==
=== Businesses ===
- Montana's BBQ & Bar, a Canadian-owned restaurant chain
- Montana Austria, a defunct airline
- Montana Rail Link, between Huntley, Montana and Spokane, Washington, U.S.
- Montana Railroad, between Lombard and Lewistown, Montana (defunct)
- Montana Wines, now Brancott Estate, a New Zealand wine company

=== Schools ===
- Institut Montana Zugerberg, in Switzerland
- Montana Academy, Marion, Montana, U.S.
- University of Montana, in Missoula, Montana, U.S.

=== Sports ===
- PFC Montana, professional association football club in Bulgaria

== Places ==
=== Bulgaria ===
- Montana Province
  - Montana Municipality
    - Montana, Bulgaria, a city

=== Canada ===
- Montana First Nation, in Albert
- Montana Mountain, in Yukon

=== United States ===
- Montana, Arkansas
- Montana, Kansas
- Montana, New Jersey
- Montana City, Montana
- Montana, West Virginia
- Montana, Wisconsin
  - Montana (community), Wisconsin
- Montana County, Kansas Territory (1859–1861)
- Montana Mountains, a mountain range in Humboldt County, Nevada
- Episcopal Diocese of Montana
- Montana District of the Lutheran Church–Missouri Synod

=== Elsewhere ===
- Montana, Tasmania, Australia
- Montana, Switzerland
- Montana 139, an Indian reserve in Alberta, Canada
- Montana (Mesoamerican site), in Guatemala
- 797 Montana, an asteroid
- Crans-Montana, Switzerland

== Transportation ==
=== Automobiles ===
- Chevrolet Montana, a light pickup truck sold in Latin America from 2003
- Pontiac Montana, a minivan 1997–2009

=== Ships ===
- USS Montana, the name of several U.S. Navy ships
  - Montana-class battleship
- Montana (ship), a paddle steamer wrecked in 1863
- Montana (steamboat), a Missouri River steamboat 1879–1884

== Other uses ==
- Montana (name), including a list of people and fictional characters with the surname, given name or nickname
- Montana (bush cricket), an insect genus in the tribe Platycleidini

== See also ==
- Montanan (disambiguation)
- Montana Band (disambiguation)
- Montano (disambiguation)
- Montanus (disambiguation)
- Montanum (disambiguation)
- A. montana (disambiguation)
- B. montana (disambiguation)
- C. montana (disambiguation)
- D. montana (disambiguation)
- E. montana (disambiguation)
- F. montana (disambiguation)
- G. montana (disambiguation)
- H. montana (disambiguation)
- I. montana (disambiguation)
- K. montana
- L. montana (disambiguation)
- M. montana (disambiguation)
- N. montana (disambiguation)
- O. montana (disambiguation)
- P. montana (disambiguation)
- R. montana (disambiguation)
- S. montana (disambiguation)
- T. montana (disambiguation)
- V. montana (disambiguation)
- W. montana
- Z. montana (disambiguation)
- Mantana Morakul (1923–2026), Thai singer
