= Montan (disambiguation) =

Montan is a municipality in South Tyrol in northern Italy.

Montan may also refer to:

- Montán, a municipality in the comarca of Alto Mijares, Spain
- Montan (troubadour) (fl. c. 1250), a Provençal troubadour whose real name is not known
- Montan Sartre, a Provençal troubadour believed to be Duran Sartor de Paernas (fl. c. 1210–50)
- Montan wax, also known as lignite wax
- Göran Montan (born 1946), a Swedish politician of the Moderate Party
- Patrick Montan (born 1976), Swiss harpsichordist and musicologist
- Sven Montan (1887–1971), Swedish diver

== See also ==
- Montana (disambiguation)
- Montagna (disambiguation)
- Montano (disambiguation)
