= C. montana =

C. montana may refer to:

- Carodista montana, a moth of the family Lecithoceridae
- Cedrela montana, the Cedro tree, of the family Meliaceae
- Centaurea montana, mountain cornflower
- Choreutis montana, a moth of the family Choreutidae
- Cicadetta montana, the New Forest cicada
- Cigaritis montana, a butterfly
- Clematis montana, the anemone clematis
- Coccothrinax montana, a palm
- Cochylimorpha montana, a moth of the family Tortricidae
- Coleophora montana, a moth of the family Coleophoridae
- Compsa montana, a beetle of the family Cerambycidae
- Craspedortha montana, a moth of the family Sphingidae
- Ctenisolabis montana, an earwig in the family Forficulidae
- Cydia montana, a moth of the family Tortricidae
- Cystopteris montana, mountain bladderfern
