= E. montana =

E. montana may refer to:

- Ena montana, an air-breathing land snail
- Epichnopterix montana, a moth of the family Psychidae
- Erethistoides montana, a South Asian river catfish
- Eucomis montana, a plant species found in Southern Africa
- Eucommia montana, an extinct species of flowering plant in the family Eucommiaceae
- Eupithecia montana, a moth in the family Geometridae

== See also ==
- Montana (disambiguation)
