= Montano (disambiguation) =

Montano may refer to:

== People ==
- Montano, an Italian surname, and anglicization of accented surnames
- Montaño, a Spanish surname
- Montano d'Arezzo (13th/14th c.) Italian painter

== Places ==
- Montaño station, Commuter Rail station in Albuquerque, New Mexico, USA

== Other uses ==
- Montano orthohantavirus (MTNV; Montano virus), a hantavirus
- Montano, a 2002 novel by Enrique Vila-Matas

== See also ==
- Montana (disambiguation)
