= Montagner =

Montagner is a surname. Notable people with this surname include:

- Domingos Montagner (1962-2016), Brazilian actor, playwright and entrepreneur
- Eduardo Montagner Anguiano (born 1975), Mexican-born Italian writer
- Santiago Montagner (born 1995), Argentine rugby union player
- Benjamin Le Montagner (born 1988), French cyclist

== See also ==
- Montagna (disambiguation)
