= M. montana =

M. montana may refer to:

- Macaduma montana, a moth of the family Erebidae
- Macrophya montana, a sawfly species
- Macrozamia montana, a plant in the family Zamiaceae
- Madhuca montana, a tree of the family Sapotaceae
- Magnolia montana, a plant species native to the Western Malesia region of the Indomalayan realm
- Megophrys montana, a horned frog
- Mentzelia montana, variegated bract blazingstar, a plant of the family Loasaceae
- Mesothen montana, a moth of the family Erebidae
- Miomantis montana, a praying mantis
- Mordellistena montana, a beetle of the family Mordellidae
- Mpanjaka montana, a moth of the family Erebidae
- Muhlenbergia montana, mountain muhly, a species of grass

== See also ==
- Montana (disambiguation)
