= Montiano (disambiguation) =

Montiano is a municipality in the Province of Forlì-Cesena in the Italian region Emilia-Romagna.

Montiano may also refer to:

- Montiano, Magliano in Toscana, village in Tuscany, a frazione of the comune of Magliano in Toscana, province of Grosseto
- Manuel de Montiano, (1685 – 1762), Spanish General and colonial administrator
- Agustín de Montiano y Luyando (1697 – 1764), Spanish dramatist

== See also ==
- Montano
