= Passiflora palenquensis =

Scientific classification
- Kingdom: Plantae
- Clade: Tracheophytes
- Clade: Angiosperms
- Clade: Eudicots
- Clade: Rosids
- Order: Malpighiales
- Family: Passifloraceae
- Genus: Passiflora
- Species: P. palenquensis

Binomial name
- Passiflora palenquensis Holm-Niels. & Lawesson

Species of vine

Passiflora palenquensis is a flowering member of the family Passifloraceae. It is very closely related to Passiflora seemannii, which has 2 other close related species. Passiflora palenquensis is restricted to low elevations, usually growing around bases of mountains. P. palenquensis is also related to Passiflora montana, which is another of the 4 relatively new species originating in Ecuador.
