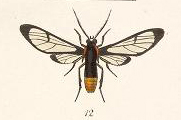
- Mesothen flaviventris

Scientific classification
- Domain: Eukaryota
- Kingdom: Animalia
- Phylum: Arthropoda
- Class: Insecta
- Order: Lepidoptera
- Superfamily: Noctuoidea
- Family: Erebidae
- Subfamily: Arctiinae
- Genus: Mesothen
- Species: M. flaviventris

Binomial name
- Mesothen flaviventris (H. Druce, 1884)

Synonyms
- Dycladia flaviventris H. Druce, 1884

= Mesothen flaviventris =

Species of moth

Mesothen flaviventris is a moth of the subfamily Arctiinae. It was described by Herbert Druce in 1884. It is found in Panama.
