= Mesothen aurantegula =

Scientific classification
- Domain: Eukaryota
- Kingdom: Animalia
- Phylum: Arthropoda
- Class: Insecta
- Order: Lepidoptera
- Superfamily: Noctuoidea
- Family: Erebidae
- Subfamily: Arctiinae
- Genus: Mesothen
- Species: M. aurantegula

Binomial name
- Mesothen aurantegula (E. D. Jones, 1914)

Synonyms
- Loxophlebia aurantegula E. D. Jones, 1914

Species of moth

Mesothen aurantegula is a moth of the subfamily Arctiinae. It was described by E. Dukinfield Jones in 1914. It is found in Brazil.
