= Mesothen pyrrha =

Scientific classification
- Domain: Eukaryota
- Kingdom: Animalia
- Phylum: Arthropoda
- Class: Insecta
- Order: Lepidoptera
- Superfamily: Noctuoidea
- Family: Erebidae
- Subfamily: Arctiinae
- Genus: Mesothen
- Species: M. pyrrha

Binomial name
- Mesothen pyrrha (Schaus, 1889)

Synonyms
- Dycladia pyrrha Schaus, 1889

Species of moth

Mesothen pyrrha is a moth of the subfamily Arctiinae. It was described by William Schaus in 1889. It is found in Mexico, Honduras, Colombia and French Guiana.
