= Gorybia simplicior =

Scientific classification
- Kingdom: Animalia
- Phylum: Arthropoda
- Clade: Pancrustacea
- Class: Insecta
- Order: Coleoptera
- Suborder: Polyphaga
- Infraorder: Cucujiformia
- Family: Cerambycidae
- Genus: Gorybia
- Species: G. simplicior

Binomial name
- Gorybia simplicior (Bates, 1870)

Species of beetle

Gorybia simplicior is a species of beetle in the family Cerambycidae. It was described by Henry Walter Bates in 1870.
