= Gorybia chontalensis =

Scientific classification
- Kingdom: Animalia
- Phylum: Arthropoda
- Clade: Pancrustacea
- Class: Insecta
- Order: Coleoptera
- Suborder: Polyphaga
- Infraorder: Cucujiformia
- Family: Cerambycidae
- Genus: Gorybia
- Species: G. chontalensis

Binomial name
- Gorybia chontalensis (Bates, 1880)

Species of beetle

Gorybia chontalensis is a species of beetle in the family Cerambycidae (Longhorn Beetle). Gorybia Chontalensis is Extant and It is found in Costa Rica & Nicaragua. It was first described by Bates in 1880.
