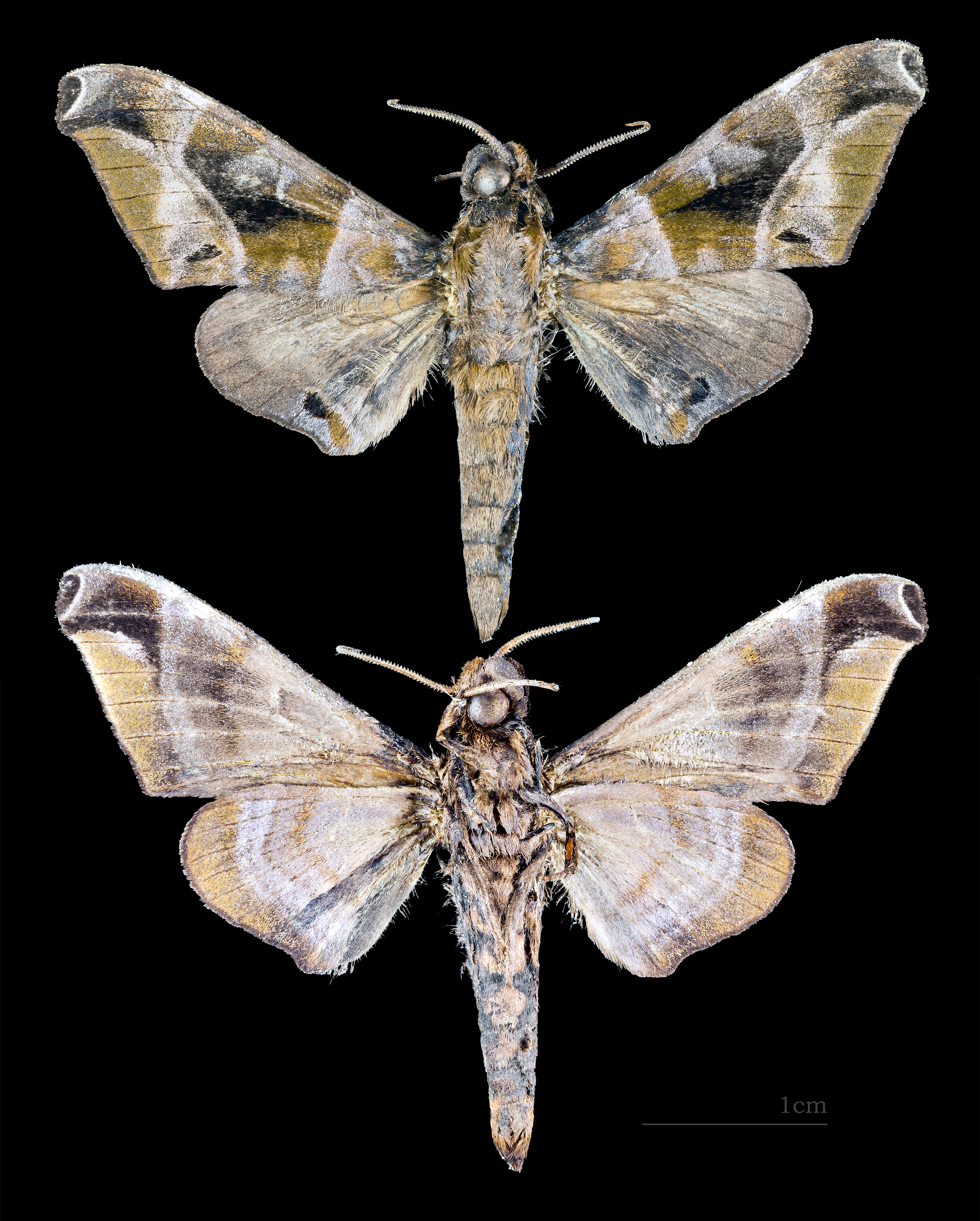
- Craspedortha porphyria

Scientific classification
- Kingdom: Animalia
- Phylum: Arthropoda
- Class: Insecta
- Order: Lepidoptera
- Family: Sphingidae
- Tribe: Smerinthini
- Genus: Craspedortha; Mell, 1922

= Craspedortha =

Genus of moths

Craspedortha is a genus of moths in the family Sphingidae. The genus was erected by Rudolf Mell in 1922.

== Species ==
- Craspedortha montana Cadiou, 2000
- Craspedortha porphyria (Butler, 1876)
