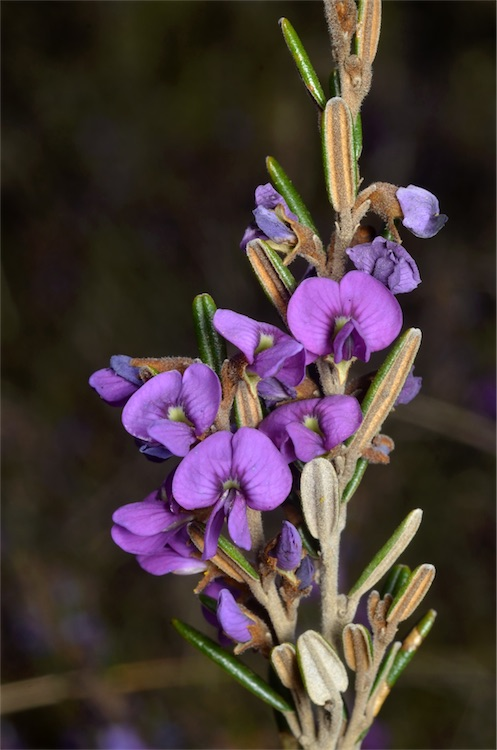

Scientific classification
- Kingdom: Plantae
- Clade: Tracheophytes
- Clade: Angiosperms
- Clade: Eudicots
- Clade: Rosids
- Order: Fabales
- Family: Fabaceae
- Subfamily: Faboideae
- Genus: Hovea
- Species: H. montana

Binomial name
- Hovea montana (Hook.f.) J.H.Ross

Synonyms
- Hovea purpurea var. montana Hook.f.; Hovea longifolia var. montana (Hook.f.) J.H.Willis

= Hovea montana =

Alpine rusty-pods

Species of legume

Hovea montana, commonly known as alpine hovea, mountain hovea or alpine rusty-pods, is a flowering plant in the family Fabaceae, and is endemic to Australia. It is a small shrub with narrow leaves and purple pea flowers.

== Description ==
Hovea montana is a small, low growing shrub usually 15–40 cm (5.9–15.7 in) high and 1–1.5 m (3 ft 3 in – 4 ft 11 in) in diameter. The stems and branches are thickly covered with soft, loosely flattened hairs. The leaves are narrow-elliptic shaped, mostly 1–3 cm (0.39–1.18 in) long and 2–5 mm (0.079–0.197 in) wide, with a depressed midrib, the margins curved downward. The upper surface smooth and hairless, the lower surface is thickly covered with fine, soft hairs. The purple-blue or white flowers are borne singly or in pairs, about 10 mm (0.39 in) long on a peduncle about 2 mm (0.079 in) long. The calyx is 4–5 mm (0.16–0.20 in) long with rusty-coloured, short, matted hairs. Flowering occurs from October to December and the fruit is a pod about 10 mm (0.39 in) long and densely covered with rusty-coloured hairs.

== Taxonomy and naming ==
This species was first formally described by Joseph Dalton Hooker, who gave it the name Hovea purpurea var. montana in The botany of the Antarctic voyage of H.M. Discovery ships Erebus and Terror. III. Flora Tasmaniae. In 1988 James Ross raised the variety to species status as Hovea montana in the journal Muelleria. The specific epithet (montana) refers to mountains or coming from mountains.

== Distribution and habitat ==
Alpine rusty-pods is mostly found in open heath, woodlands and grassy situations at higher altitudes in New South Wales, Victoria and Tasmania.
