= B. montana =

B. montana may refer to:

- Banksia montana, the Stirling Range dryandra, a shrub of the family Proteaceae
- Belantsea montana, an extinct petalodontid cartilaginous fish
- Bigotilia montana, a moth of the family Pterophoridae
- Borboniella montana, a moth of the family Tortricidae
- Bosara montana, a moth of the family Geometridae
- Brachychampsa montana, an extinct alligatoroid
- Brachypteryx montana, the white-browed shortwing
- Bryotropha montana, a moth of the family Gelechiidae
- Bucculatrix montana, a moth in the family Bucculatricidae
- Buddleja montana, a shrub of the figwort family
