= Mesothen ignea =

Scientific classification
- Domain: Eukaryota
- Kingdom: Animalia
- Phylum: Arthropoda
- Class: Insecta
- Order: Lepidoptera
- Superfamily: Noctuoidea
- Family: Erebidae
- Subfamily: Arctiinae
- Genus: Mesothen
- Species: M. ignea

Binomial name
- Mesothen ignea H. Druce, 1898

Species of moth

Mesothen ignea is a moth of the subfamily Arctiinae. It was described by Herbert Druce in 1898. It is found in Mexico.
