= Compsa multiguttata =

Scientific classification
- Kingdom: Animalia
- Phylum: Arthropoda
- Clade: Pancrustacea
- Class: Insecta
- Order: Coleoptera
- Suborder: Polyphaga
- Infraorder: Cucujiformia
- Family: Cerambycidae
- Genus: Compsa
- Species: C. multiguttata

Binomial name
- Compsa multiguttata Melzer, 1935

Species of beetle

Compsa multiguttata is a species of beetle in the family Cerambycidae. It was described by Melzer in 1935. It is found in Brazil (Goiás, Mato Grosso, Maranhão, Pernambuco, Bahia, Minas Gerais, Espírito Santo, Rio de Janeiro, São Paulo, Paraná, Santa Catarina, Rio Grande do Sul), Bolivia (Santa Cruz), Paraguay and Argentina (Salta, Tucumán, Chaco, Misiones, Corrientes).
