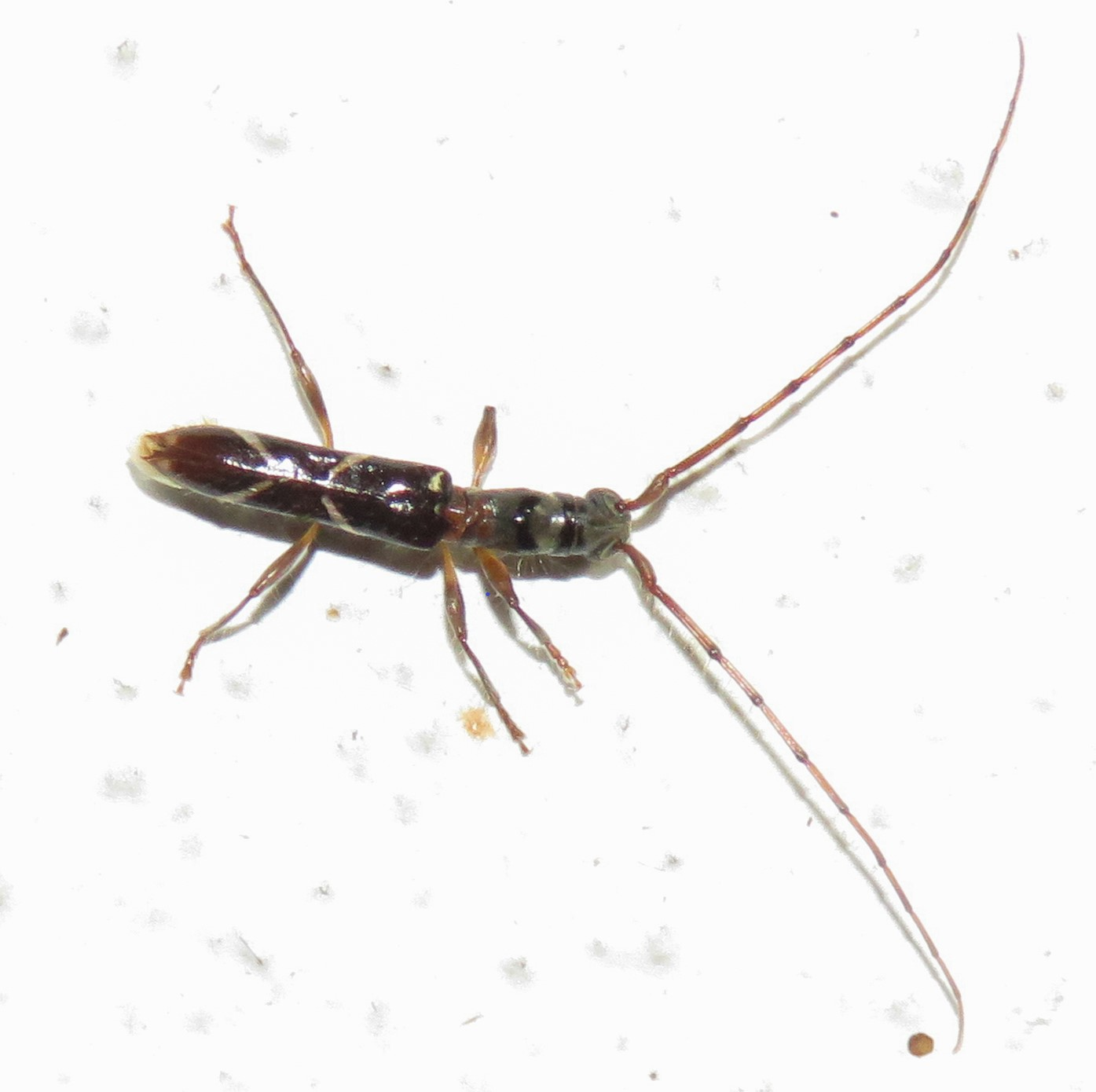
- Compsa albopicta

Scientific classification
- Domain: Eukaryota
- Kingdom: Animalia
- Phylum: Arthropoda
- Class: Insecta
- Order: Coleoptera
- Suborder: Polyphaga
- Infraorder: Cucujiformia
- Family: Cerambycidae
- Subfamily: Cerambycinae
- Tribe: Ibidionini
- Genus: Compsa; Perty, 1832

= Compsa (beetle) =

Genus of beetles

Compsa is a genus of beetles in the family Cerambycidae, containing the following species:

- Compsa albomaculata Martins, 1962
- Compsa albopicta Perty, 1832
- Compsa amoena Fisher, 1937
- Compsa curtula Martins & Napp, 1986
- Compsa diringshofeni (Martins, 1960)
- Compsa inconstans Gounelle, 1909
- Compsa leucozona (Bates, 1885)
- Compsa macra (Thomson, 1867)
- Compsa monrosi (Prosen, 1961)
- Compsa montana Martins, 1971
- Compsa multiguttata Melzer, 1935
- Compsa nebulosa Martins, 1970
- Compsa nipha Martins & Napp, 1986
- Compsa quadriguttata (White, 1855)
