= Gorybia =

Scientific classification
- Kingdom: Animalia
- Phylum: Arthropoda
- Class: Insecta
- Order: Coleoptera
- Suborder: Polyphaga
- Infraorder: Cucujiformia
- Family: Cerambycidae
- Subfamily: Cerambycinae
- Tribe: Piezocerini
- Genus: Gorybia; Pascoe, 1866

Genus of beetles

Gorybia is a genus of beetles in the family Cerambycidae, containing the species:

- Gorybia acuta Martins, 1976
- Gorybia adiaphora Martins, 1976
- Gorybia alboapex Martins, 1976
- Gorybia amazonensis Martins & Galileo, 2010
- Gorybia apatheia Martins, 1976
- Gorybia armata Martins, 1976
- Gorybia bahiensis Galileo & Martins, 2010
- Gorybia bispinosa Martins, Galileo & de-Oliveira, 2009
- Gorybia calcitrapa Martins, 1976
- Gorybia castanea (Gounelle, 1909)
- Gorybia chontalensis (Bates, 1880)
- Gorybia echinata Martins, 1976
- Gorybia hirsutella Martins, 1976
- Gorybia instita Martins, 1976
- Gorybia invicta Martins, 1976
- Gorybia lissonota Martins, 1976
- Gorybia maculosa Martins, 1976
- Gorybia martes Pascoe, 1866
- Gorybia minima Martins, 1976
- Gorybia montana Martins & Galileo, 2007
- Gorybia orygma Martins, 1976
- Gorybia pallida Martins, 1976
- Gorybia palpalis Martins, 1976
- Gorybia picturata Martins, 1976
- Gorybia pilosa Martins, 1976
- Gorybia procera Martins, 1976
- Gorybia proxima Martins, 1976
- Gorybia pusilla (Bates, 1870)
- Gorybia quadrispinosa Galileo & Martins, 2008
- Gorybia reclusa Martins, 1976
- Gorybia rondonia Galileo & Martins, 2010
- Gorybia ruficauda (Gounelle, 1909)
- Gorybia rugosa Martins, 1976
- Gorybia semiopaca Martins, 1976
- Gorybia senticosa Martins, 1976
- Gorybia separata Martins, 1976
- Gorybia simplicior (Bates, 1870)
- Gorybia stomias Martins, 1976
- Gorybia sulcata Martins & Galileo, 2010
- Gorybia suturella Martins, 1976
- Gorybia thoracica Martins, 1976
- Gorybia tibialis Martins, 1976
- Gorybia umbella Martins, 1976
- Gorybia veneficella Martins, 1976
- Gorybia zonula Martins, 1976
