= Mesothen albifrons =

Scientific classification
- Domain: Eukaryota
- Kingdom: Animalia
- Phylum: Arthropoda
- Class: Insecta
- Order: Lepidoptera
- Superfamily: Noctuoidea
- Family: Erebidae
- Subfamily: Arctiinae
- Genus: Mesothen
- Species: M. albifrons

Binomial name
- Mesothen albifrons Schaus, 1901

Species of moth

Mesothen albifrons is a moth of the subfamily Arctiinae. It was described by Schaus in 1901. It is found in Colombia.
