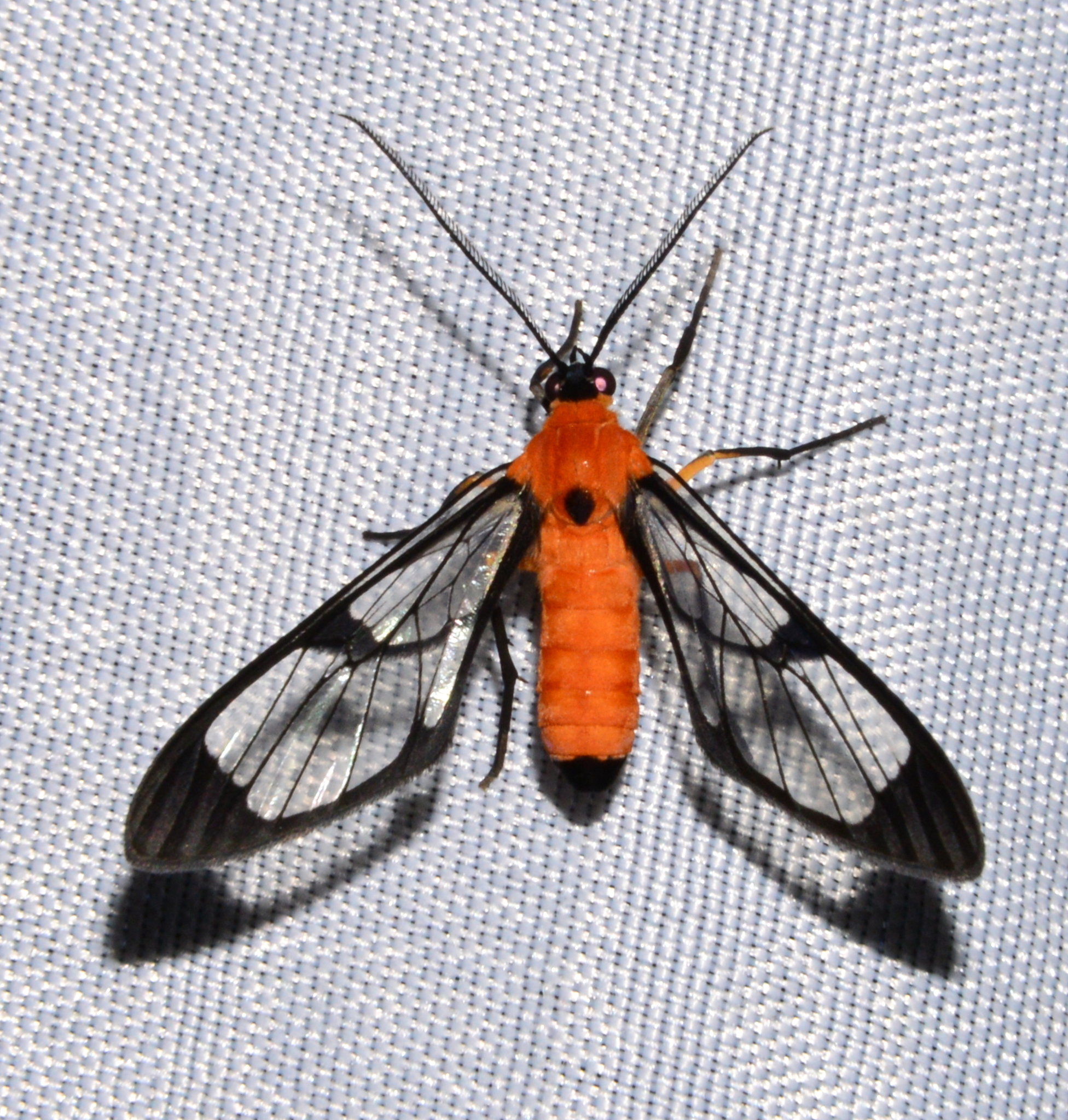

Scientific classification
- Domain: Eukaryota
- Kingdom: Animalia
- Phylum: Arthropoda
- Class: Insecta
- Order: Lepidoptera
- Superfamily: Noctuoidea
- Family: Erebidae
- Subfamily: Arctiinae
- Genus: Mesothen
- Species: M. bisexualis

Binomial name
- Mesothen bisexualis Dognin, 1912

= Mesothen bisexualis =

Species of moth

Mesothen bisexualis is a species of moth in the subfamily Arctiinae. It is found in Colombia and Ecuador.
