= Mesothen zenobia =

Scientific classification
- Domain: Eukaryota
- Kingdom: Animalia
- Phylum: Arthropoda
- Class: Insecta
- Order: Lepidoptera
- Superfamily: Noctuoidea
- Family: Erebidae
- Subfamily: Arctiinae
- Genus: Mesothen
- Species: M. zenobia

Binomial name
- Mesothen zenobia Schaus, 1927

Species of moth

Mesothen zenobia is a moth of the subfamily Arctiinae. It was described by Schaus in 1927. It is found in Brazil.
