= F. montana =

F. montana may refer to:

- Ficus montana, the Oakleaf Fig
- Flabellobasis montana, a snout moth
