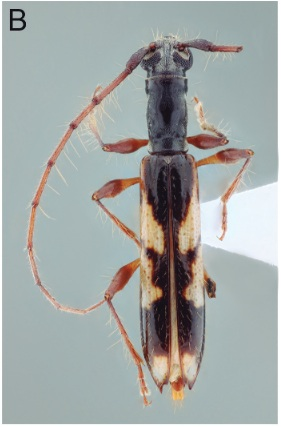

Scientific classification
- Kingdom: Animalia
- Phylum: Arthropoda
- Clade: Pancrustacea
- Class: Insecta
- Order: Coleoptera
- Suborder: Polyphaga
- Infraorder: Cucujiformia
- Family: Cerambycidae
- Genus: Compsa
- Species: C. amoena

Binomial name
- Compsa amoena Fisher, 1937

= Compsa amoena =

Species of beetle

Compsa amoena is a species of beetle in the family Cerambycidae. It was described by Fisher in 1937. It is found in Bolivia, Brazil (Bahia, Minas Gerais, Espirito Santo, Rio de Janeiro, São Paulo, Paraná, Santa Catarina, Rio Grande do Sul), Paraguay and Argentina.
