= Compsa monrosi =

Scientific classification
- Domain: Eukaryota
- Kingdom: Animalia
- Phylum: Arthropoda
- Class: Insecta
- Order: Coleoptera
- Suborder: Polyphaga
- Infraorder: Cucujiformia
- Family: Cerambycidae
- Genus: Compsa
- Species: C. monrosi

Binomial name
- Compsa monrosi (Prosen, 1961)

Species of beetle

Compsa monrosi is a species of beetle in the family Cerambycidae. It was described by Prosen in 1961.
