= Gorybia bahiensis =

Scientific classification
- Kingdom: Animalia
- Phylum: Arthropoda
- Clade: Pancrustacea
- Class: Insecta
- Order: Coleoptera
- Suborder: Polyphaga
- Infraorder: Cucujiformia
- Family: Cerambycidae
- Genus: Gorybia
- Species: G. bahiensis

Binomial name
- Gorybia bahiensis Martins & Galileo, 2010

Species of beetle

Gorybia bahiensis is a species of beetle in the family Cerambycidae. It was described by Martins and Galileo in 2010.
