= Mesothen desperata =

Scientific classification
- Kingdom: Animalia
- Phylum: Arthropoda
- Class: Insecta
- Order: Lepidoptera
- Superfamily: Noctuoidea
- Family: Erebidae
- Subfamily: Arctiinae
- Genus: Mesothen
- Species: M. desperata

Binomial name
- Mesothen desperata (Walker, 1856)

Synonyms
- Pseudomya desperata Walker, 1856

Species of moth

Mesothen desperata is a moth of the subfamily Arctiinae. It was described by Francis Walker in 1856. It is found in Panama and Brazil.
