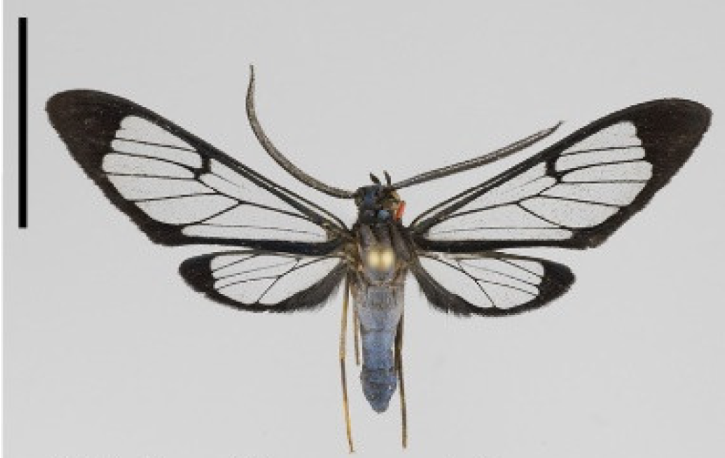

Scientific classification
- Domain: Eukaryota
- Kingdom: Animalia
- Phylum: Arthropoda
- Class: Insecta
- Order: Lepidoptera
- Superfamily: Noctuoidea
- Family: Erebidae
- Subfamily: Arctiinae
- Genus: Mesothen
- Species: M. caeruleicorpus

Binomial name
- Mesothen caeruleicorpus Schaus, 1905

= Mesothen caeruleicorpus =

Species of moth

Mesothen caeruleicorpus is a moth of the subfamily Arctiinae. It was described by Schaus in 1905. It is found in Bolivia, Colombia, Ecuador, and Peru.
