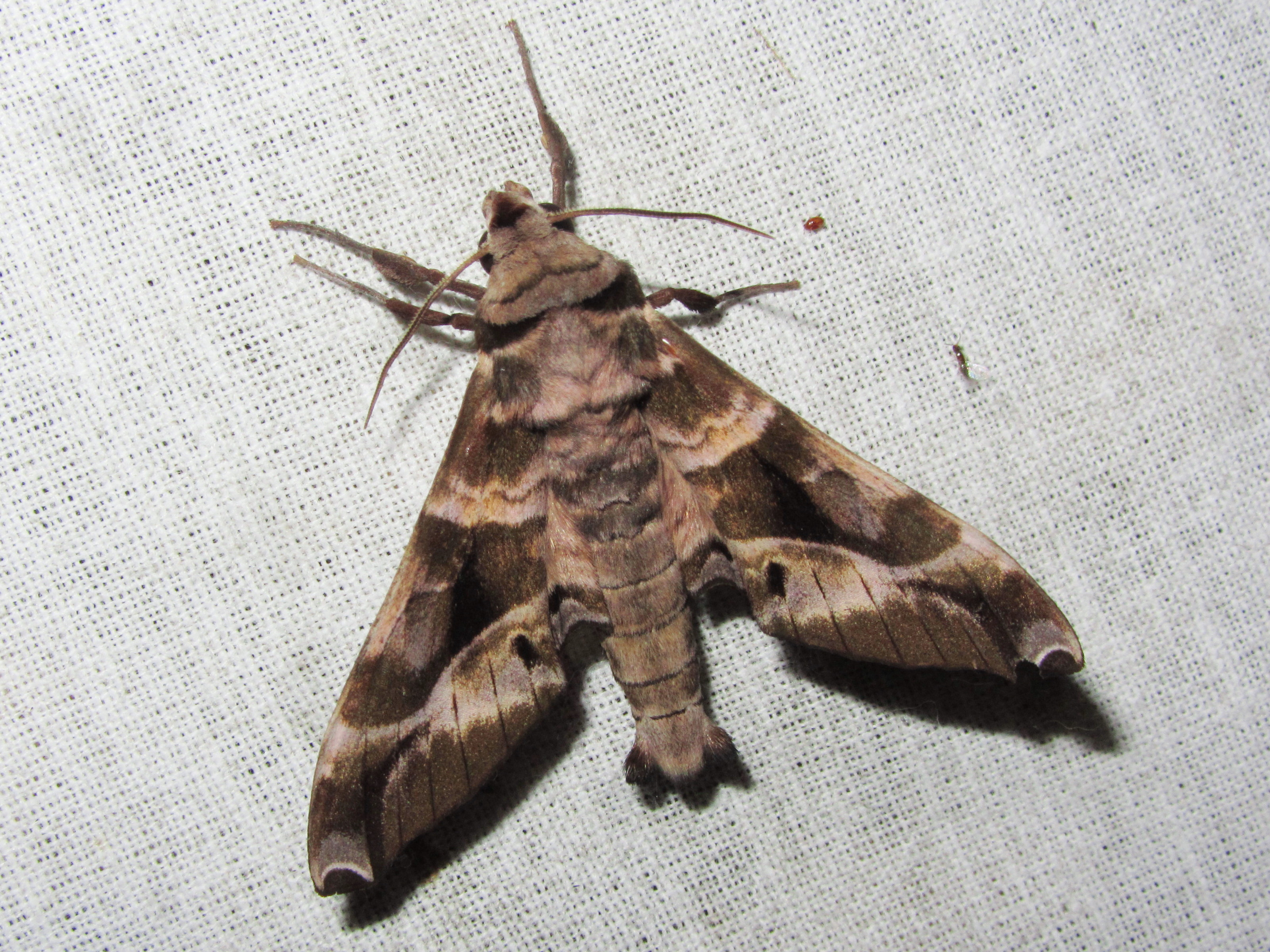

Scientific classification
- Domain: Eukaryota
- Kingdom: Animalia
- Phylum: Arthropoda
- Class: Insecta
- Order: Lepidoptera
- Family: Sphingidae
- Genus: Craspedortha
- Species: C. porphyria

Binomial name
- Craspedortha porphyria (Butler, 1876)

Synonyms
- Daphnusa porphyria Butler, 1876; Craspedortha inapicalis Mell, 1922; Parum porphyria basale Dupont, 1937

= Craspedortha porphyria =

Species of moth

Craspedortha porphyria is a species of moth of the family Sphingidae.

== Distribution ==
It is known from Nepal, north-eastern India, Myanmar, southern China, and south to Vietnam and central Thailand. It is also known from Java.

== Description ==
The wingspan is about 60 mm. The ground colour of the forewing upperside consists of shades of brown and pale grey with pale purple highlights. There is a dark, roughly pentagonal patch found on the median area.

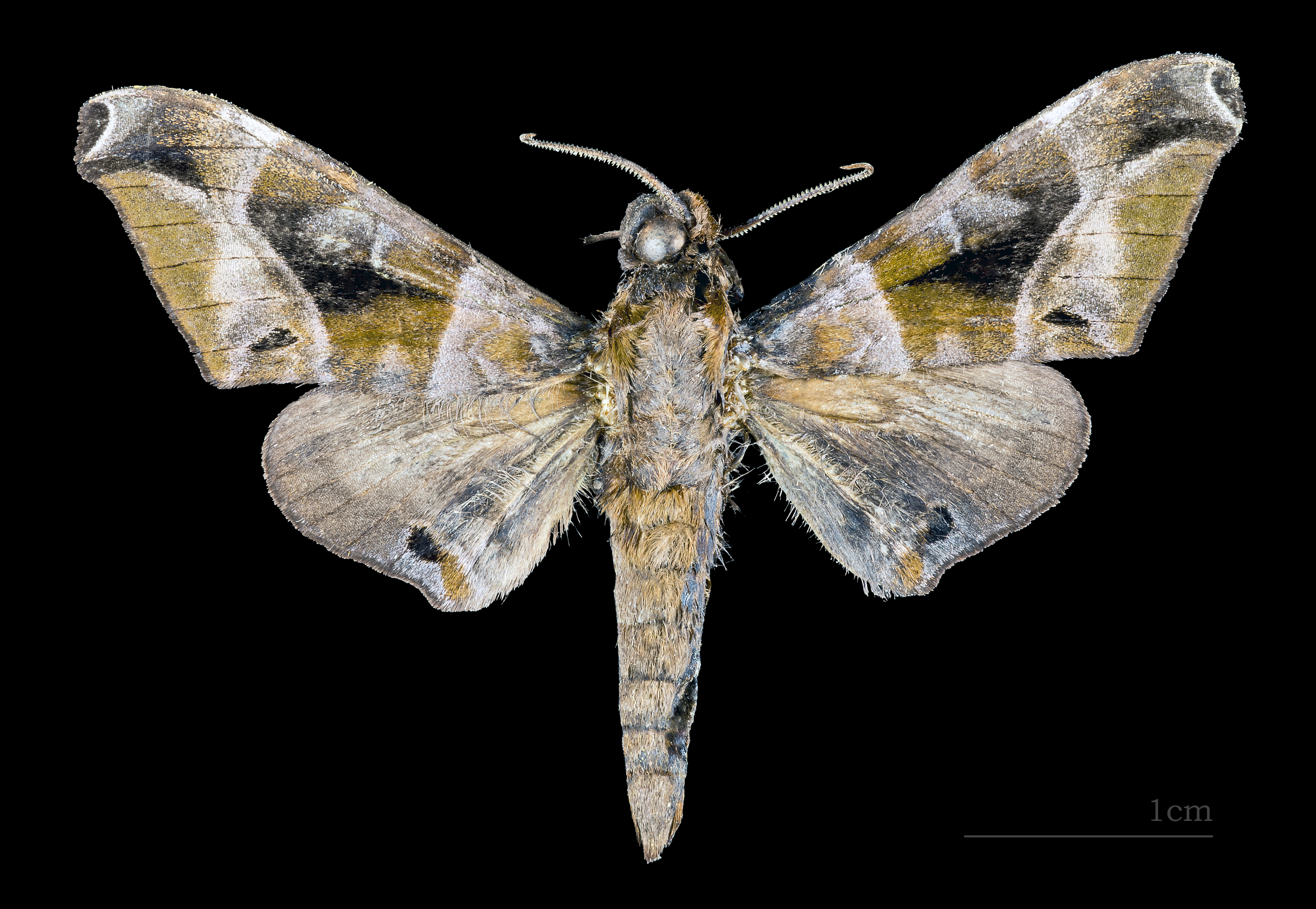
Male dorsal MHNT

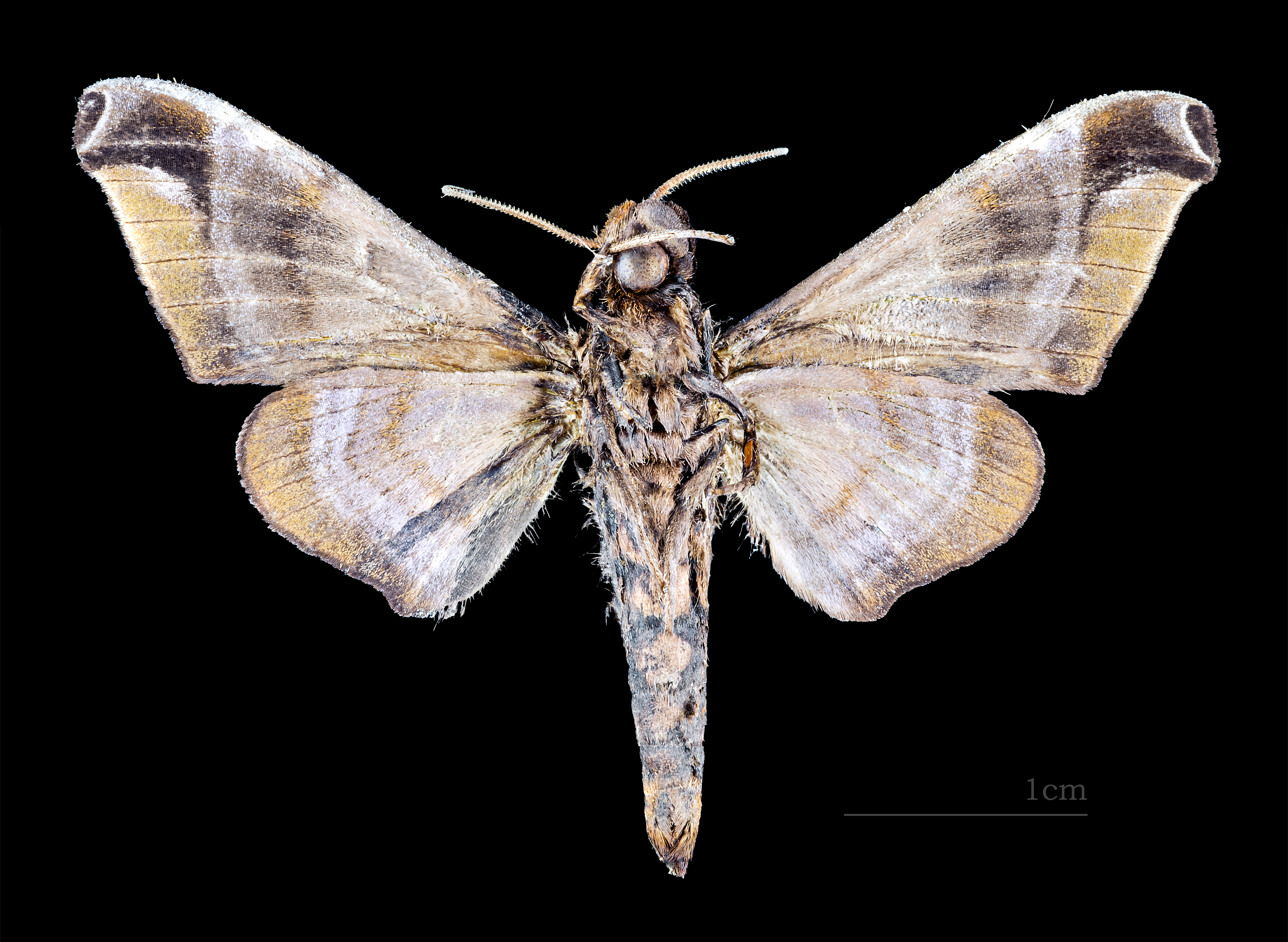
Male ventral MHNT

The larvae have been recorded feeding on Vitex canescens in Laos and Thailand.

== Subspecies ==
- Craspedortha porphyria porphyria (Nepal, north-eastern India, Myanmar, southern China, and south to Vietnam and central Thailand)
- Craspedortha porphyria basale (Dupont, 1937) (Java)
