= Mesothen tigrina =

Scientific classification
- Domain: Eukaryota
- Kingdom: Animalia
- Phylum: Arthropoda
- Class: Insecta
- Order: Lepidoptera
- Superfamily: Noctuoidea
- Family: Erebidae
- Subfamily: Arctiinae
- Genus: Mesothen
- Species: M. tigrina

Binomial name
- Mesothen tigrina Rothschild, 1931

Species of moth

Mesothen tigrina is a moth of the subfamily Arctiinae. It was described by Rothschild in 1931. It is found in Venezuela.
