= Mesothen inconspicuata =

Scientific classification
- Domain: Eukaryota
- Kingdom: Animalia
- Phylum: Arthropoda
- Class: Insecta
- Order: Lepidoptera
- Superfamily: Noctuoidea
- Family: Erebidae
- Subfamily: Arctiinae
- Genus: Mesothen
- Species: M. inconspicuata

Binomial name
- Mesothen inconspicuata Kaye, 1911

Species of moth

Mesothen inconspicuata is a moth of the subfamily Arctiinae. It was described by William James Kaye in 1911. It is found in Guyana.
