= Mesothen aurata =

Scientific classification
- Domain: Eukaryota
- Kingdom: Animalia
- Phylum: Arthropoda
- Class: Insecta
- Order: Lepidoptera
- Superfamily: Noctuoidea
- Family: Erebidae
- Subfamily: Arctiinae
- Genus: Mesothen
- Species: M. aurata

Binomial name
- Mesothen aurata Dognin, 1913

Species of moth

Mesothen aurata is a moth of the subfamily Arctiinae. It was described by Paul Dognin in 1913. It is found in Colombia.
