= Gorybia bispinosa =

Scientific classification
- Kingdom: Animalia
- Phylum: Arthropoda
- Clade: Pancrustacea
- Class: Insecta
- Order: Coleoptera
- Suborder: Polyphaga
- Infraorder: Cucujiformia
- Family: Cerambycidae
- Genus: Gorybia
- Species: G. bispinosa

Binomial name
- Gorybia bispinosa Martins, Galileo & Limeira-de-Oliveira, 2009

Species of beetle

Gorybia bispinosa is a species of beetle in the family Cerambycidae.
