= Montana Band =

Montana Band may refer to:

- Mission Mountain Wood Band, an American musical group, formerly known as "the Montana Band"
- Montana (band), an Australian musical group
- Montana First Nation, an indigenous government in Canada, formerly known as "the Montana Band of Indians"

== See also ==
- Montana (disambiguation)
- Montanan (disambiguation)
