= Mesothen flavicostata =

Scientific classification
- Domain: Eukaryota
- Kingdom: Animalia
- Phylum: Arthropoda
- Class: Insecta
- Order: Lepidoptera
- Superfamily: Noctuoidea
- Family: Erebidae
- Subfamily: Arctiinae
- Genus: Mesothen
- Species: M. flavicostata

Binomial name
- Mesothen flavicostata H. Druce, 1906

Species of moth

Mesothen flavicostata is a moth of the subfamily Arctiinae. It was described by Herbert Druce in 1906. It is found in Peru.
