= Mesothen pyrrhina =

Scientific classification
- Domain: Eukaryota
- Kingdom: Animalia
- Phylum: Arthropoda
- Class: Insecta
- Order: Lepidoptera
- Superfamily: Noctuoidea
- Family: Erebidae
- Subfamily: Arctiinae
- Genus: Mesothen
- Species: M. pyrrhina

Binomial name
- Mesothen pyrrhina E. D. Jones, 1914

Synonyms
- Mesothen pyrrhina ab. derubrata Zerny, 1931

Species of moth

Mesothen pyrrhina is a moth of the subfamily Arctiinae. It was described by E. Dukinfield Jones in 1914. It is found in Brazil.
