= Mesothen demicostata =

Scientific classification
- Domain: Eukaryota
- Kingdom: Animalia
- Phylum: Arthropoda
- Class: Insecta
- Order: Lepidoptera
- Superfamily: Noctuoidea
- Family: Erebidae
- Subfamily: Arctiinae
- Genus: Mesothen
- Species: M. demicostata

Binomial name
- Mesothen demicostata Kaye, 1918

Species of moth

Mesothen demicostata is a moth of the subfamily Arctiinae. It was described by William James Kaye in 1918. It is found in Colombia.

The wingspan is about 28 mm. The forewings are yellowish transparent. The costa on the central area is bright orange and black basally and on the apical third of the wing. The hindwings are yellowish transparent, with a black outer margin.
