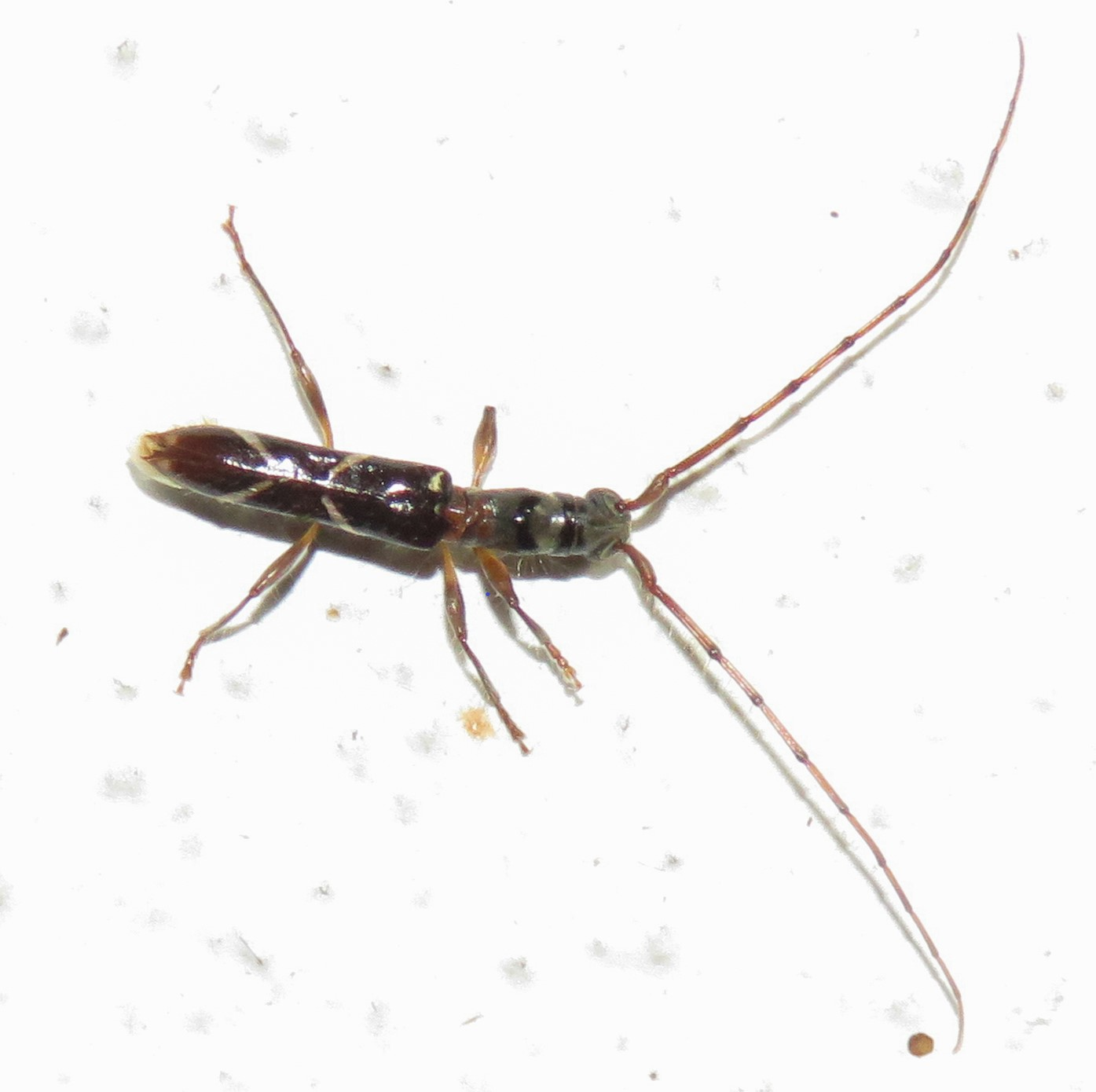

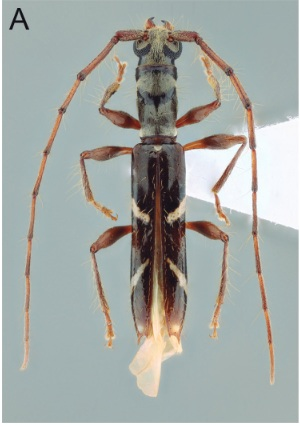

Scientific classification
- Kingdom: Animalia
- Phylum: Arthropoda
- Clade: Pancrustacea
- Class: Insecta
- Order: Coleoptera
- Suborder: Polyphaga
- Infraorder: Cucujiformia
- Family: Cerambycidae
- Genus: Compsa
- Species: C. albopicta

Binomial name
- Compsa albopicta Perty, 1832

= Compsa albopicta =

Species of beetle

Compsa albopicta is a species of beetle in the family Cerambycidae. It was described by Perty in 1832. It is found in Peru, Brazil (Bahia, Goiás, Mato Grosso do Sul, Minas Gerais, Espirito Santo, Rio de Janeiro, São Paulo, Paraná, Santa Catarina, Rio Grande do Sul), Paraguay and Argentina.
