= H. montana =

H. montana may refer to:

- Hechtia montana, a plant of the family Bromeliaceae
- Heliciopsis montana, tree of the family Proteaceae
- Hopea montana, plant in the family Dipterocarpaceae
- Horsfieldia montana, plant of the family Myristicaceae
- Hovea montana, mountain hovea, shrub of the family Fabaceae
- Hudsonia montana, the mountain golden heather, a flowering plant species endemic to North Carolina
- Hybomitra montana, slender-horned horsefly
- Hyperplatys montana, longhorn beetle of the subfamily Lamiinae
