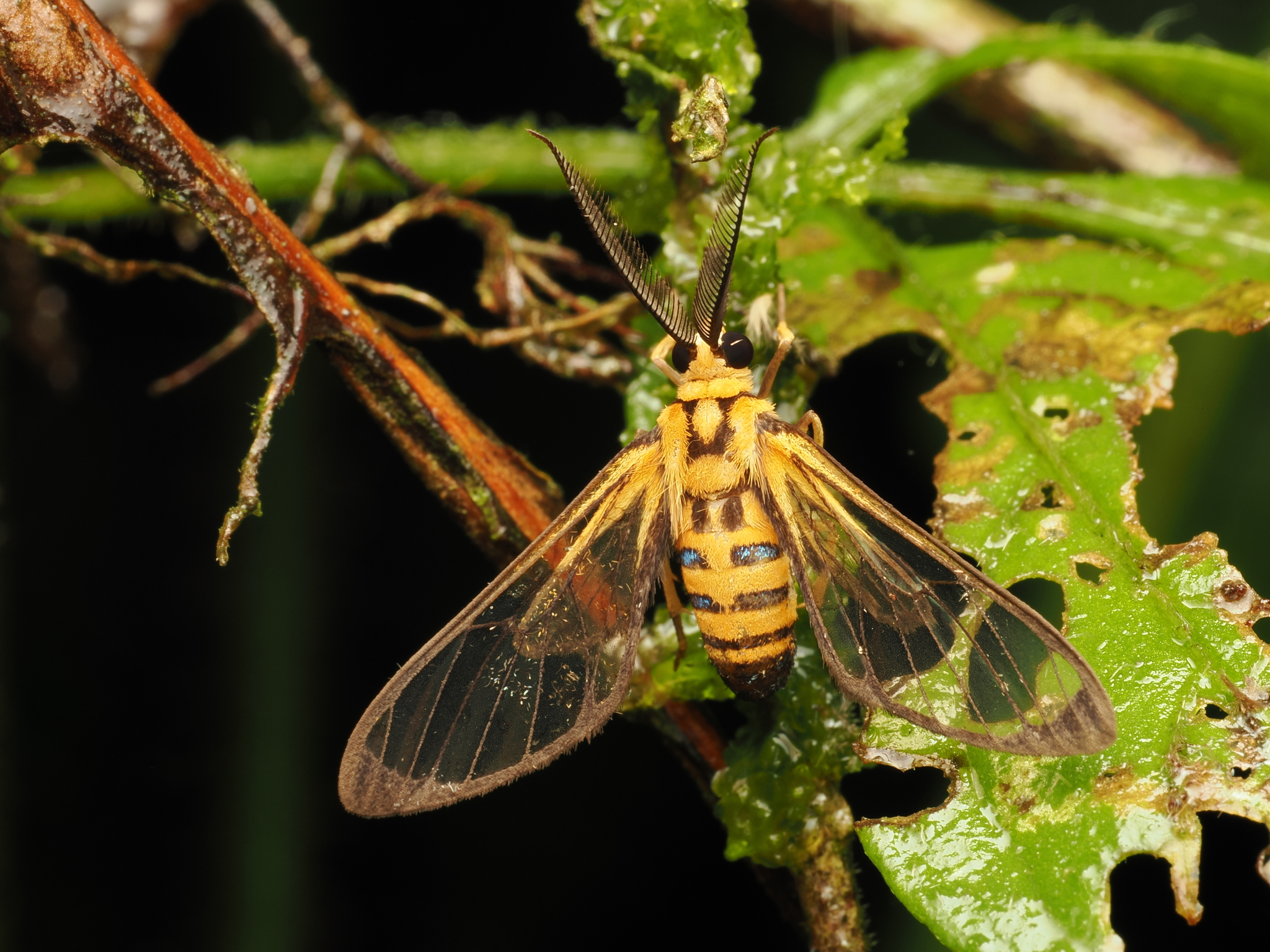

Scientific classification
- Kingdom: Animalia
- Phylum: Arthropoda
- Clade: Pancrustacea
- Class: Insecta
- Order: Lepidoptera
- Superfamily: Noctuoidea
- Family: Erebidae
- Subfamily: Arctiinae
- Genus: Mesothen
- Species: M. nomia

Binomial name
- Mesothen nomia H. Druce, 1900

= Mesothen nomia =

Species of moth

Mesothen nomia is a moth of the subfamily Arctiinae. It was described by Herbert Druce in 1900. It is found in Colombia.

== Gallery ==
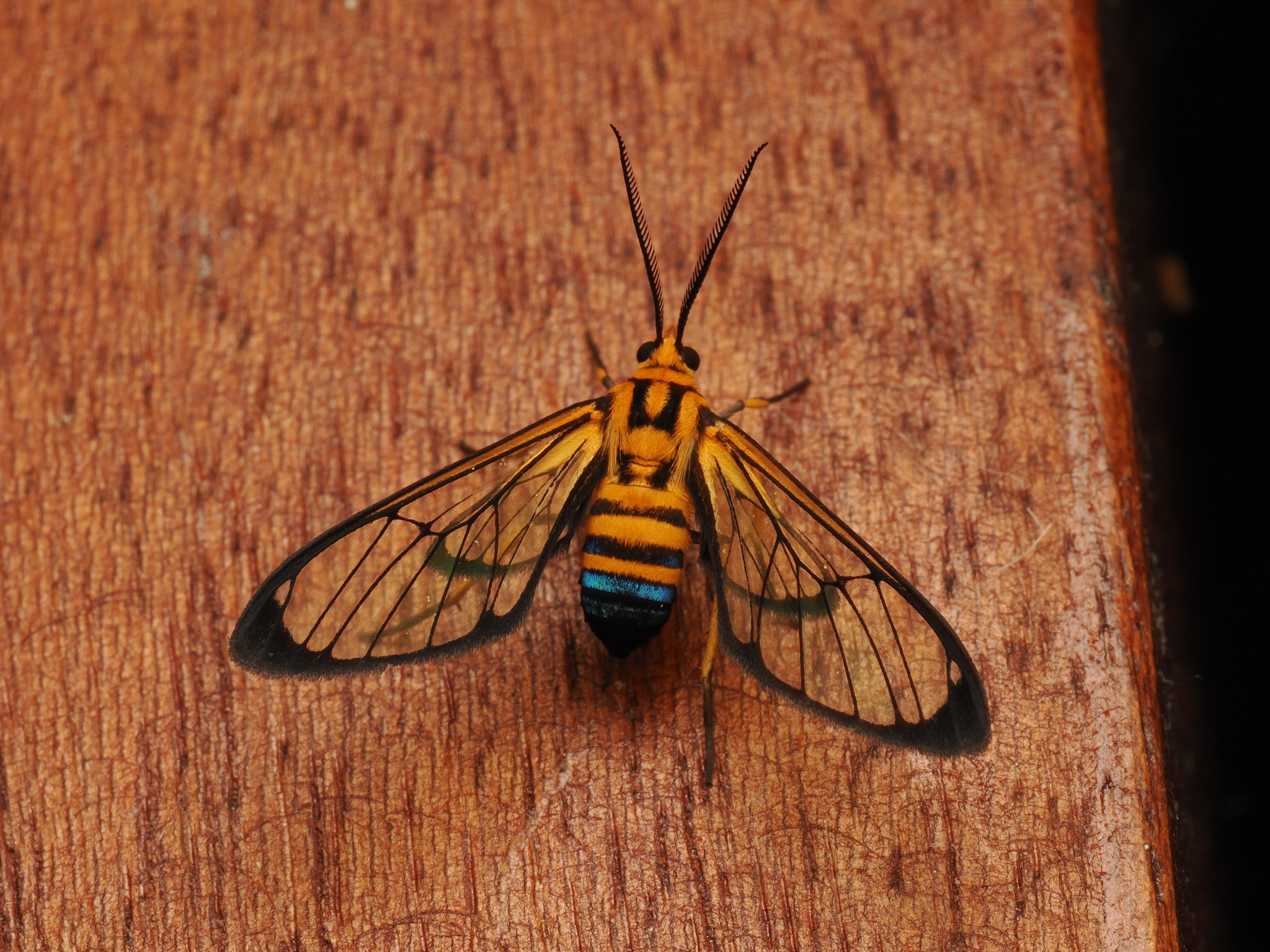
Mesothen nomia from Metropolitan District of Quito, Ecuador

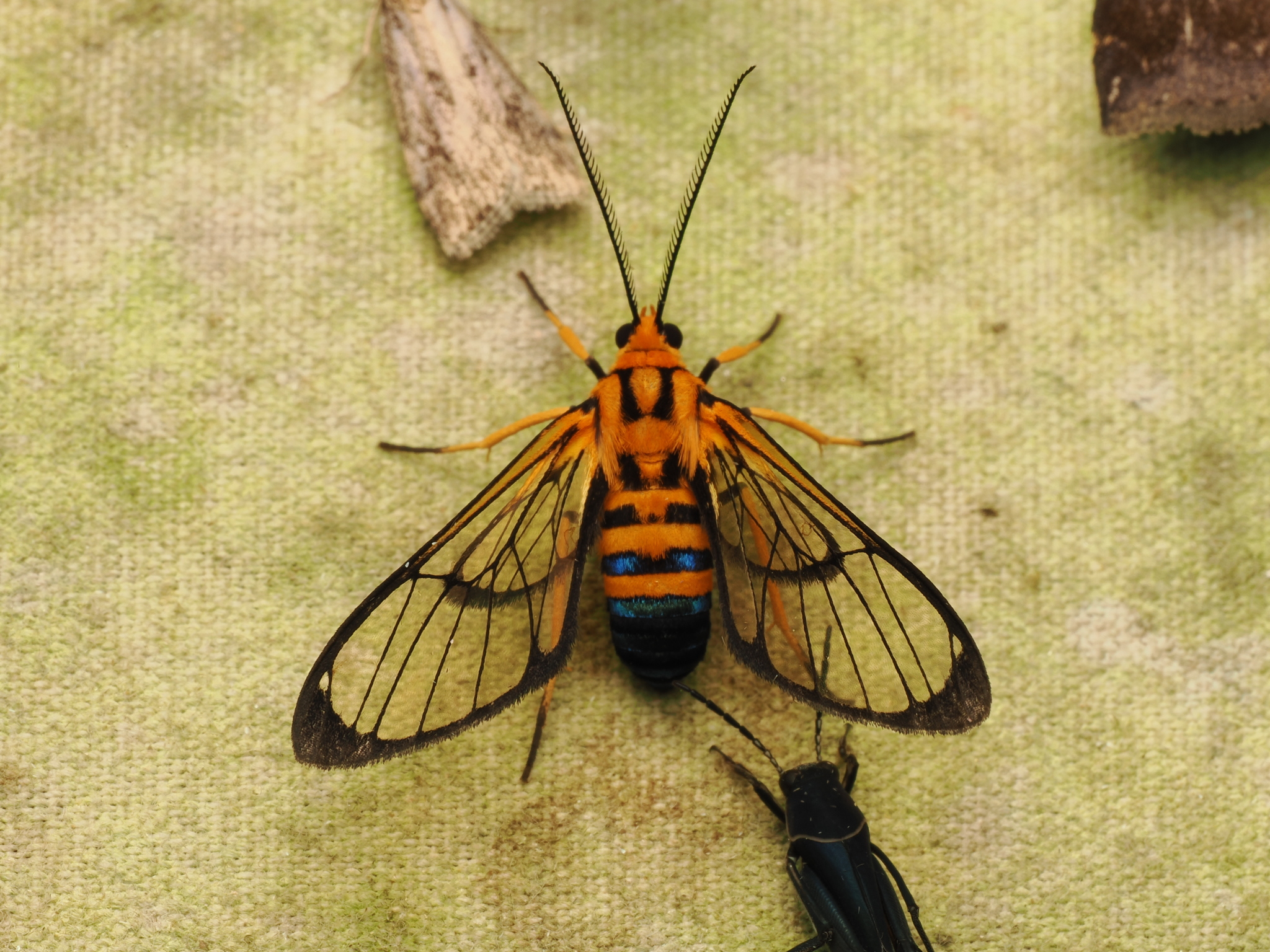
Mesothen nomia from Metropolitan District of Quito, Ecuador
