= Compsa macra =

Scientific classification
- Domain: Eukaryota
- Kingdom: Animalia
- Phylum: Arthropoda
- Class: Insecta
- Order: Coleoptera
- Suborder: Polyphaga
- Infraorder: Cucujiformia
- Family: Cerambycidae
- Genus: Compsa
- Species: C. macra

Binomial name
- Compsa macra (Thomson, 1867)

Species of beetle

Compsa macra is a species of beetle in the family Cerambycidae. It was described by Thomson in 1867.
