= Mesothen ockendeni =

Scientific classification
- Domain: Eukaryota
- Kingdom: Animalia
- Phylum: Arthropoda
- Class: Insecta
- Order: Lepidoptera
- Superfamily: Noctuoidea
- Family: Erebidae
- Subfamily: Arctiinae
- Genus: Mesothen
- Species: M. ockendeni

Binomial name
- Mesothen ockendeni H. Druce, 1905

Species of moth

Mesothen ockendeni is a moth of the subfamily Arctiinae. It was described by Herbert Druce in 1905. It is found in Peru.
