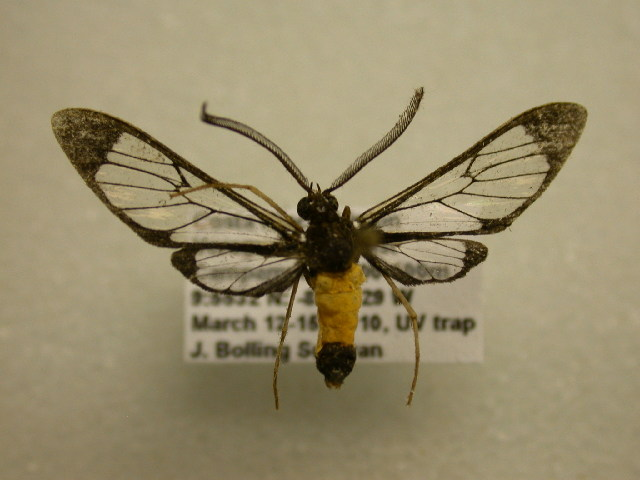
- Mesothen ethela

Scientific classification
- Domain: Eukaryota
- Kingdom: Animalia
- Phylum: Arthropoda
- Class: Insecta
- Order: Lepidoptera
- Superfamily: Noctuoidea
- Family: Erebidae
- Subfamily: Arctiinae
- Tribe: Arctiini
- Subtribe: Euchromiina
- Genus: Mesothen; Hampson, 1898

= Mesothen (moth) =

Genus of moths

Mesothen is a genus of moths in the subfamily Arctiinae. The genus was erected by George Hampson in 1898.

== Species ==
The genus includes the following species:

- Mesothen albifrons Schaus, 1901
- Mesothen albilimbata Dognin, 1912
- Mesothen aurantegula E. D. Jones, 1914
- Mesothen aurantiaca Dognin, 1906
- Mesothen aurata Dognin, 1913
- Mesothen bisexualis Dognin, 1912
- Mesothen caeruleicorpus Schaus, 1905
- Mesothen catherina Schaus, 1892
- Mesothen cosmosomoides Rothschild, 1911
- Mesothen demicostata Kaye, 1918
- Mesothen dorsimacula Rothschild, 1911
- Mesothen desperata Walker, 1856
- Mesothen endoleuca Druce, 1905
- Mesothen epimetheus Schaus, 1892
- Mesothen erythaema Hampson, 1898
- Mesothen ethela Schaus, 1911
- Mesothen flavicostata Druce, 1906
- Mesothen flaviventris Druce, 1884
- Mesothen ignea Druce, 1898
- Mesothen inconspicuata Kaye, 1911
- Mesothen meridensis Rothschild, 1911
- Mesothen montana Schaus, 1911
- Mesothen nana Schaus, 1905
- Mesothen nomia Druce, 1900
- Mesothen ockendeni Druce, 1905
- Mesothen perflava Kaye, 1911
- Mesothen petosiris Druce, 1883
- Mesothen pyrrha Schaus, 1889
- Mesothen pyrrhina E. D. Jones, 1914
- Mesothen restricta Rothschild, 1931
- Mesothen rogenhoferi Schaus, 1892
- Mesothen roseifemur Draudt, 1915
- Mesothen samina Druce, 1896
- Mesothen semiflava Rothschild, 1911
- Mesothen temperata Schaus, 1911
- Mesothen tigrina Rothschild, 1931
- Mesothen zenobia Schaus, 1927
