= Gorybia pusilla =

Scientific classification
- Kingdom: Animalia
- Phylum: Arthropoda
- Clade: Pancrustacea
- Class: Insecta
- Order: Coleoptera
- Suborder: Polyphaga
- Infraorder: Cucujiformia
- Family: Cerambycidae
- Genus: Gorybia
- Species: G. pusilla

Binomial name
- Gorybia pusilla (Bates, 1870)

Species of beetle

Gorybia pusilla is a species of beetle in the family Cerambycidae. It was described by Bates in 1870.
