= P. montana =

P. montana may refer to:

- Passiflora montana, plant in the family Passifloraceae
- Platyptilia montana, moth of the family Pterophoridae
- Pradosia montana, plant in the family Sapotaceae
- Prestoea montana, the Sierran palm
- Prumnopitys montana, conifer of the family Podocarpaceae
- Psydrax montana, plant of the family Rubiaceae
- Pueraria montana, plant of the bean family
