= S. montana =

S. montana may refer to:

- Sarcopteryx montana, an Australian rainforest tree
- Saurauia montana, a tree of the Chinese gooseberry family
- Schistura montana, a stone loach
- Scutellaria montana, mountain skullcap, a plant of the deadnettle family
- Sozusa montana, a moth of the family Erebidae
- Sphegina montana, a hoverfly of the family Syrphidae
- Stagmomantis montana, a praying mantis
- Stigmella montana, a moth of the family Nepticulidae
- Sycacantha montana, a moth of the family Tortricidae
- Syssphinx montana, a moth of the family Saturniidae
