= Gorybia martes =

Scientific classification
- Kingdom: Animalia
- Phylum: Arthropoda
- Clade: Pancrustacea
- Class: Insecta
- Order: Coleoptera
- Suborder: Polyphaga
- Infraorder: Cucujiformia
- Family: Cerambycidae
- Genus: Gorybia
- Species: G. martes

Binomial name
- Gorybia martes Pascoe, 1866

Species of beetle

Gorybia martes is a species of beetle in the family Cerambycidae. It is found in Brazil (Bahia, Minas Gerais, Espírito Santo, Rio de Janeiro, São Paulo, Paraná, Santa Catarina), Paraguay and Argentina (Misiones).
