= Mesothen meridensis =

Scientific classification
- Domain: Eukaryota
- Kingdom: Animalia
- Phylum: Arthropoda
- Class: Insecta
- Order: Lepidoptera
- Superfamily: Noctuoidea
- Family: Erebidae
- Subfamily: Arctiinae
- Genus: Mesothen
- Species: M. meridensis

Binomial name
- Mesothen meridensis Rothschild, 1911

Species of moth

Mesothen meridensis is a moth of the subfamily Arctiinae. It was described by Rothschild in 1911. It is found in Guyana.
