= Mesothen rogenhoferi =

Scientific classification
- Domain: Eukaryota
- Kingdom: Animalia
- Phylum: Arthropoda
- Class: Insecta
- Order: Lepidoptera
- Superfamily: Noctuoidea
- Family: Erebidae
- Subfamily: Arctiinae
- Genus: Mesothen
- Species: M. rogenhoferi

Binomial name
- Mesothen rogenhoferi (Schaus, 1892)

Synonyms
- Dycladia rogenhoferi Schaus, 1892

Species of moth

Mesothen rogenhoferi is a moth of the subfamily Arctiinae. It was described by William Schaus in 1892. It is found in Rio de Janeiro, Brazil.
