= Gorybia acuta =

Scientific classification
- Kingdom: Animalia
- Phylum: Arthropoda
- Clade: Pancrustacea
- Class: Insecta
- Order: Coleoptera
- Suborder: Polyphaga
- Infraorder: Cucujiformia
- Family: Cerambycidae
- Genus: Gorybia
- Species: G. acuta

Binomial name
- Gorybia acuta Martins, 1976

Species of beetle

Gorybia acuta is a species of beetle in the family Cerambycidae. It was described by Martins in 1976.
