= Compsa inconstans =

Scientific classification
- Domain: Eukaryota
- Kingdom: Animalia
- Phylum: Arthropoda
- Class: Insecta
- Order: Coleoptera
- Suborder: Polyphaga
- Infraorder: Cucujiformia
- Family: Cerambycidae
- Genus: Compsa
- Species: C. inconstans

Binomial name
- Compsa inconstans Gounelle, 1909

Species of beetle

Compsa inconstans is a species of beetle in the family Cerambycidae. It was described by Gounelle in 1909.
