= Mesothen albilimbata =

Scientific classification
- Kingdom: Animalia
- Phylum: Arthropoda
- Clade: Pancrustacea
- Class: Insecta
- Order: Lepidoptera
- Superfamily: Noctuoidea
- Family: Erebidae
- Subfamily: Arctiinae
- Genus: Mesothen
- Species: M. albilimbata

Binomial name
- Mesothen albilimbata Dognin, 1912

Species of moth

Mesothen albilimbata is a moth belonging to the subfamily Arctiinae. It was described by Paul Dognin in 1912. It is found in Colombia.
