= L. montana =

L. montana may refer to:

- Limnanthes montana, mountain meadowfoam
- Lindernia montana, a plant of the family Linderniaceae
- Lophocampa montana, a moth of the family Erebidae
- Lophostachys montana, a plant of the acanthus family
