= G. montana =

G. montana my refer to:

- Gorybia montana, beetle of the family Cerambycidae
- Grouvellina montana, ground beetle of the subfamily Rhysodinae
