= Compsa nipha =

Scientific classification
- Domain: Eukaryota
- Kingdom: Animalia
- Phylum: Arthropoda
- Class: Insecta
- Order: Coleoptera
- Suborder: Polyphaga
- Infraorder: Cucujiformia
- Family: Cerambycidae
- Genus: Compsa
- Species: C. nipha

Binomial name
- Compsa nipha Martins & Napp, 1986

Species of beetle

Compsa nipha is a species of beetle in the family Cerambycidae. It was described by Martins and Napp in 1986.
