= Mesothen catherina =

Scientific classification
- Domain: Eukaryota
- Kingdom: Animalia
- Phylum: Arthropoda
- Class: Insecta
- Order: Lepidoptera
- Superfamily: Noctuoidea
- Family: Erebidae
- Subfamily: Arctiinae
- Genus: Mesothen
- Species: M. catherina

Binomial name
- Mesothen catherina (Schaus, 1892)

Synonyms
- Dycladia catherina Schaus, 1892

Species of moth

Mesothen catherina is a moth of the subfamily Arctiinae. It was described by William Schaus in 1892. It is found in Santa Catarina, Brazil.
