= Gorybia ruficauda =

Scientific classification
- Kingdom: Animalia
- Phylum: Arthropoda
- Clade: Pancrustacea
- Class: Insecta
- Order: Coleoptera
- Suborder: Polyphaga
- Infraorder: Cucujiformia
- Family: Cerambycidae
- Genus: Gorybia
- Species: G. ruficauda

Binomial name
- Gorybia ruficauda (Gounelle, 1909)

Species of beetle

Gorybia ruficauda is a species of beetle in the family Cerambycidae. It was described by Gounelle in 1909.
