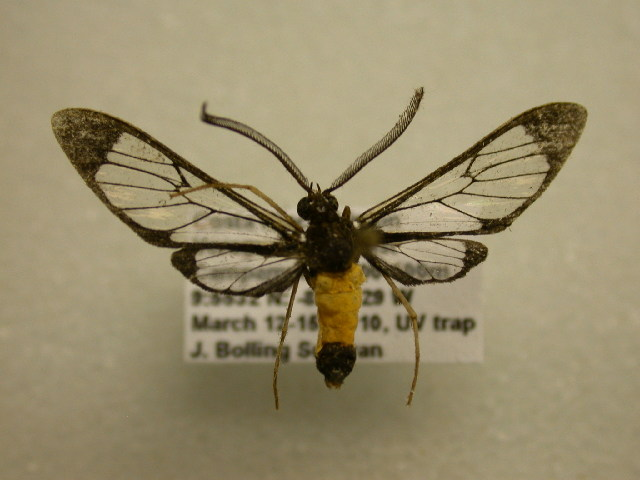

Scientific classification
- Domain: Eukaryota
- Kingdom: Animalia
- Phylum: Arthropoda
- Class: Insecta
- Order: Lepidoptera
- Superfamily: Noctuoidea
- Family: Erebidae
- Subfamily: Arctiinae
- Genus: Mesothen
- Species: M. ethela

Binomial name
- Mesothen ethela Schaus, 1911

= Mesothen ethela =

Species of moth

Mesothen ethela is a moth of the subfamily Arctiinae. It was described by Schaus in 1911. It is found in Costa Rica.
