= Benjamin Le Montagner =

French cyclist

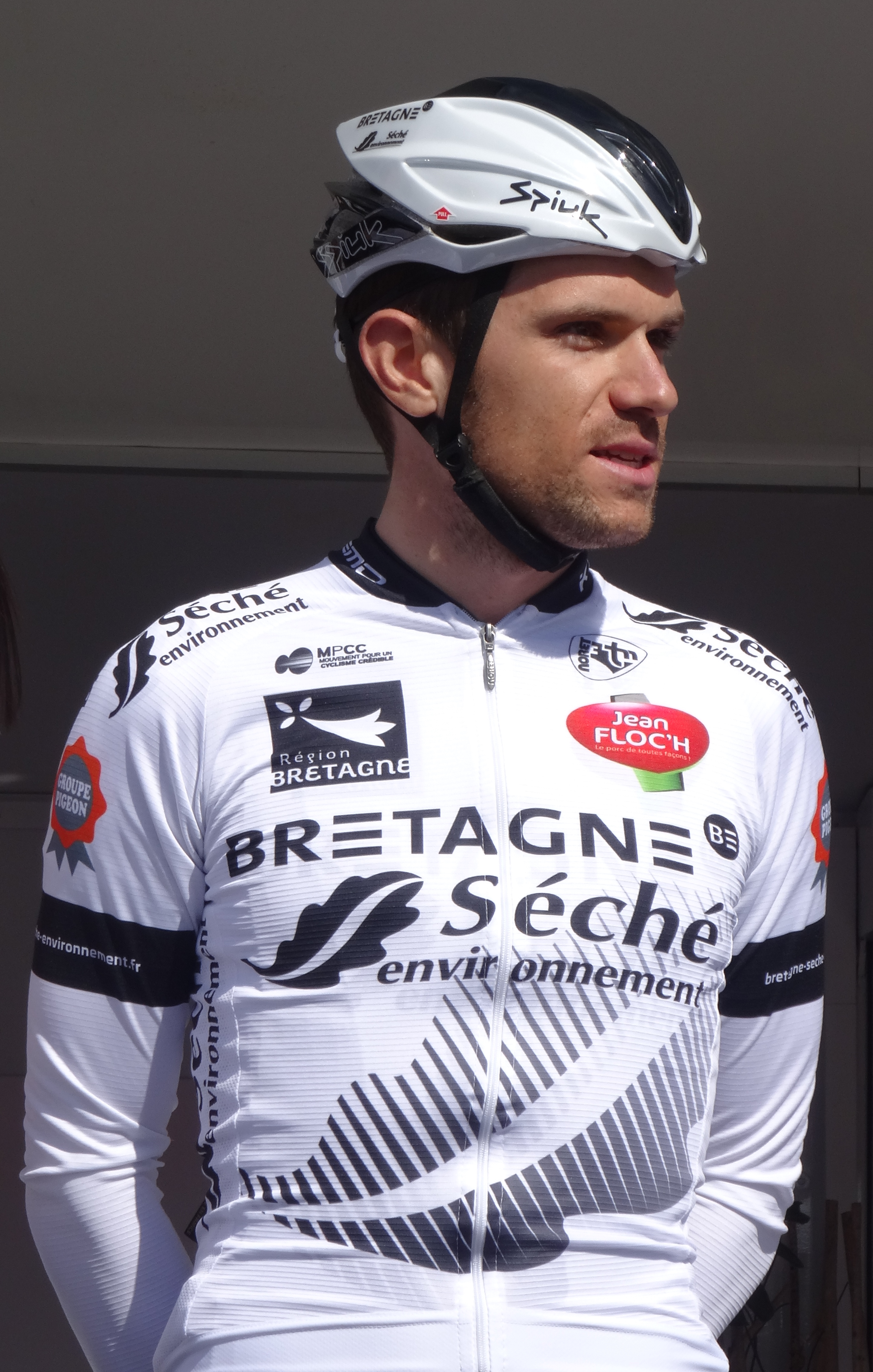
- Le Montagner in 2014

Personal information
- Full name: Benjamin Le Montagner
- Born: June 16, 1988 (age 38) Léhon, France

Cycling career
- Sport: Cycling
- Current team: Retired
- Discipline: Road
- Role: Rider

Amateur teams
- 2007–2008: AC Lanester
- 2009: VC Rouen 76
- 2010: UC Briochine
- 2011–2012: Côtes d'Armor–Marie Morin
- 2015: Team UC Nantes Atlantique
- 2016–2017: Côtes d'Armor–Marie Morin

Professional team
- 2013–2014: Bretagne–Séché Environnement

Benjamin Le Montagner (born 16 June 1988 in Léhon) is a French former professional road cyclist, who competed for Bretagne–Séché Environnement in 2013 and 2014. His brother Maxime is also a cyclist.

== Major results ==
2012
1st Stage 1 Tour de Bretagne Cycliste
