= Montagna =

Montagna may refer to:

== Places ==
- Montan (Italian: Montagna), municipality in the South of South Tyrol in northern Italy
- Brindisi Montagna, town and comune in the province of Potenza, in the Southern Italian region of Basilicata
- San Zeno di Montagna, comune in the Province of Verona in the Italian region Veneto
- Montagna dei Fiori, mountain group in the Abruzzo, central Italy
- Montagna di Vernà (1287 m), peak of the Peloritani Mountains, located in the province of Messina, Sicily
- Montagna in Valtellina, comune in the Province of Sondrio in the Italian region Lombardy
- Montagna-le-Reconduit, commune in the Jura department in Franche-Comté in eastern France
- Montagna-le-Templier, former commune in the Jura department in Bourgogne-Franche-Comté in eastern France

== People ==
- Bartolomeo Montagna (1450–1523), Italian painter and architect
- Benedetto Montagna (c.1480–1555/1558), Italian engraver and painter
- Bull Montana (1887–1950), a.k.a. Lewis Montagna, born Luigi Montagna, was an Italian-American professional wrestler
- Ezequiel Montagna (born 1994), Argentine professional footballer
- Leigh Montagna (born 1983), Australian rules footballer
- Leonardo Montagna (1425/1426–1484), Italian humanist poet
- Paolo Montagna (born 1976), Sammarinese footballer
- Salvatore Montagna (1971–2011), boss of the Bonanno crime family in New York City
- William Montagna (1913–1994), Italian-American dermatological researcher and professor

== Other ==
- Ferrari 212 E Montagna, sports racing car produced by Ferrari in 1968
- Ecomuseo della Montagna Pistoiese (Ecomuseum of the Pistoian Mountain Region), museum in the Province of Pistoia, Italy
- Rossignola di Montagna, wine grape
- Podolica abruzzese di montagna, extinct breed of domestic cattle from the Abruzzo region of southern Italy
- La montagna del dio cannibale (The Mountain of the Cannibal God), 1979 Italian cult movie starring Ursula Andress and Stacy Keach

== See also ==
- Montana (disambiguation)
