= Montaño =

Montaño is a Spanish-language surname, related, but pronounced differently, to the Italian surname Montano and French surname Montaigne. The name Montano also occurs without the "ny" sound ñ as Montano in Spain. Notable people with the surname include:

- Alysia Montaño née Johnson, American track and field athlete, 800 metres national champion
- Cristian Montaño, Colombian football player
- Gabriela Montaño (born 1975), Bolivian physician and politician
- Miguel Montaño (born 1991), Colombian footballer who plays for Seattle Sounders FC
- Víctor Montaño (born 1984), Colombian football player

== See also ==
- Montano, Italian surname
