= Z. montana =

Z. montana may refer to:

- Zamia montana, a plant in the family Zamiaceae
- Zealanapis montana, a New Zealand spider
