= Craspedortha montana =

Scientific classification
- Kingdom: Animalia
- Phylum: Arthropoda
- Clade: Pancrustacea
- Class: Insecta
- Order: Lepidoptera
- Family: Sphingidae
- Genus: Craspedortha
- Species: C. montana

Binomial name
- Craspedortha montana Cadiou, 2000

Species of moth

Craspedortha montana is a species of moth of the family Sphingidae. It is known from Yunnan in China and northern Thailand.

The length of the forewings is 23–24.5 mm for males and about 27 mm for females.

In northern Thailand, adults have been recorded in February and July.
