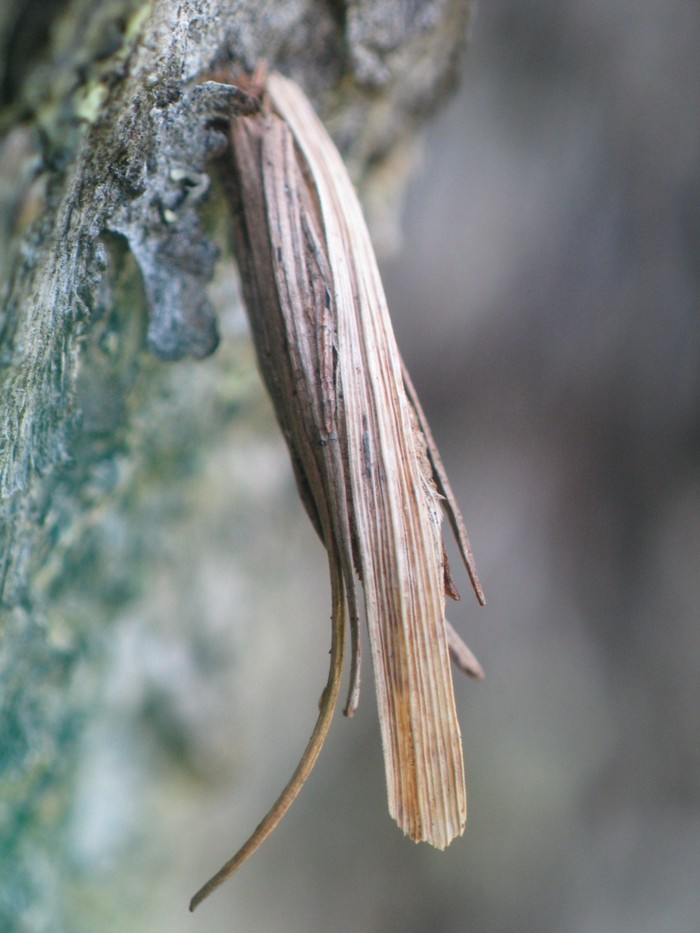

Scientific classification
- Domain: Eukaryota
- Kingdom: Animalia
- Phylum: Arthropoda
- Class: Insecta
- Order: Lepidoptera
- Family: Psychidae
- Genus: Epichnopterix
- Species: E. montana

Binomial name
- Epichnopterix montana Heylaerts, 1900

Synonyms
- Epichnopteryx pulla var. montana Heylaerts, 1900

= Epichnopterix montana =

Species of moth

Epichnopterix montana is a moth of the Psychidae family. It is found in Austria, Switzerland and Italy.
