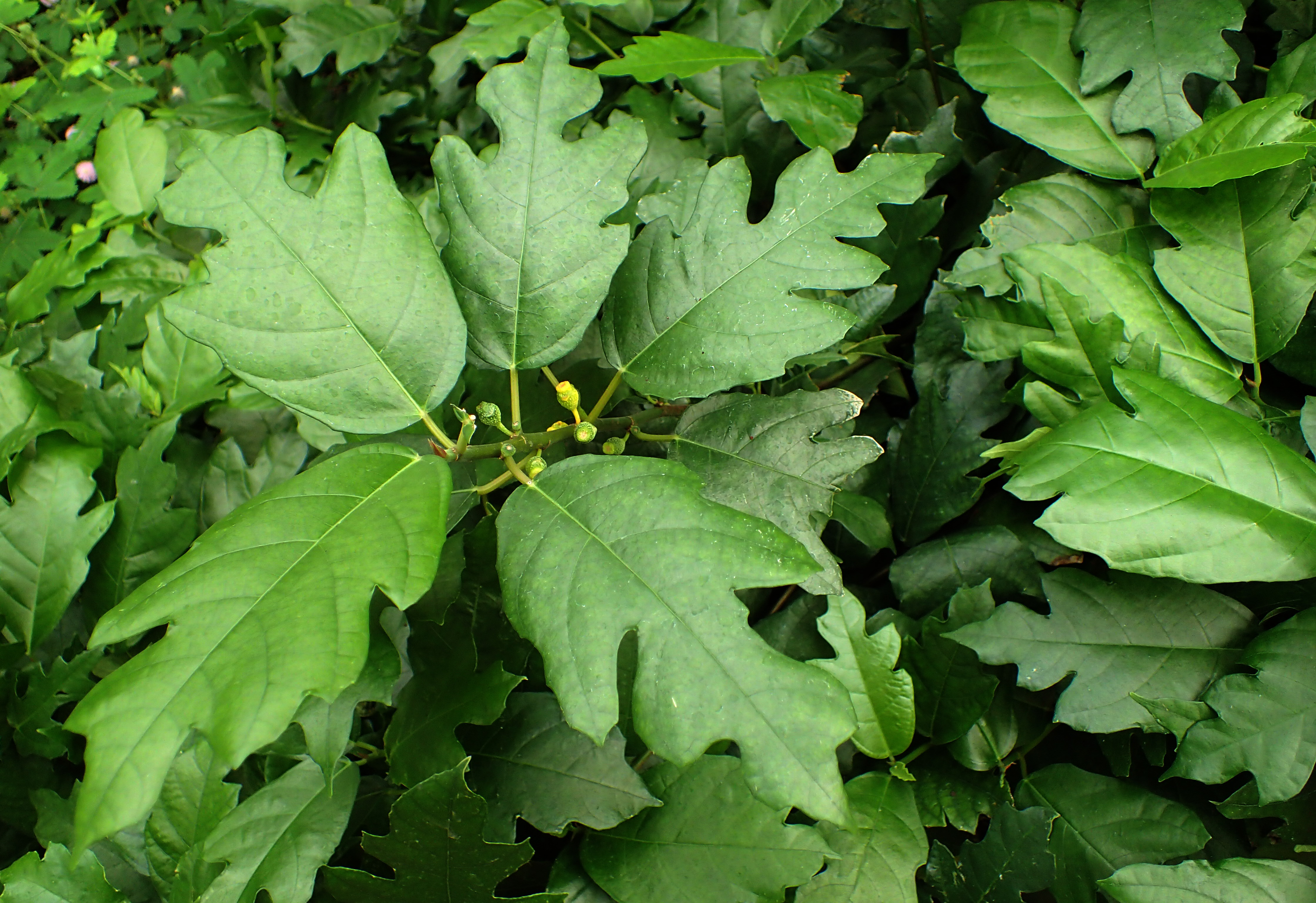

Conservation status
- Least Concern (IUCN 3.1)

Scientific classification
- Kingdom: Plantae
- Clade: Tracheophytes
- Clade: Angiosperms
- Clade: Eudicots
- Clade: Rosids
- Order: Rosales
- Family: Moraceae
- Genus: Ficus
- Subgenus: F. subg. Sycidium
- Species: F. montana

Binomial name
- Ficus montana Burm.f.

Synonyms
- Synonymy: Ficus ampelos f. microcarpa Hochr.; Ficus ampullacea Wight ex Miq.; Ficus biglandulosa Miq., nom. illeg. homonym. post.; Ficus humilis Roxb.; Ficus inconstans Miq.; Ficus javanensis Dum.Cours.; Ficus loddigesii Heynh.; Ficus madurensis Miq.; Ficus madurensis var. angustifolia Corner; Ficus montana var. purpurascens (Blume) Corner; Ficus polycarpa var. latifolia Miq.; Ficus purpurascens Desf.; Ficus purpurascens Blume; Ficus quercifolia G.Lodd., nom. illeg. homonym. post.; Ficus quercifolia var. aspera Koord. & Valeton; Ficus quercifolia var. humilis (Roxb.) King; Ficus quercifolia var. inconstans (Miq.) Ridl.; Ficus sclerocoma Miq.; Ficus smaragdina S.Moore

= Ficus montana =

Species of fig

Ficus montana (common name oakleaf fig) is a species of subtropical climbing fig. It is a subshrub or shrub native to Bangladesh, western Indochina (Laos, Myanmar, and Thailand) and western Malesia (Borneo, Java, Peninsular Malaysia, and Sumatra). Leaves are 3 to 5 inches long. The leaves are shaped like oak leaves which gives its common name. It is grown as a houseplant, in offices and in shopping malls. It is slow growing. It is often confused with the tiny F. pumila quercifolia, which is a vining species that creeps on the surface of soil. The Latin specific epithet montana refers to mountains or coming from mountains.
