= Montano virus =

Orthohantavirus montanoense

Virus classification
- (unranked): Virus
- Realm: Riboviria
- Kingdom: Orthornavirae
- Phylum: Negarnaviricota
- Class: Bunyaviricetes
- Order: Elliovirales
- Family: Hantaviridae
- Genus: Orthohantavirus
- Species: Orthohantavirus montanoense

Synonyms
- Montano orthohantavirus; Montaño virus

Species of virus

Montaño virus (MTNV) is a single-stranded, enveloped, negative sense RNA species of hantavirus. It was first isolated in Mexican wild rodents located in Morelos and Guerrero, Mexico.
