= V. montana =

V. montana may refer to:

- Vachellia montana, legume of the family Fabaceae
- Velleia montana, plant of the family Goodeniaceae
- Vernicia montana, tree of the spurge family
