= Passiflora montana =

Conservation status
- Endangered (IUCN 3.1)

Scientific classification
- Kingdom: Plantae
- Clade: Tracheophytes
- Clade: Angiosperms
- Clade: Eudicots
- Clade: Rosids
- Order: Malpighiales
- Family: Passifloraceae
- Genus: Passiflora
- Species: P. montana

Binomial name
- Passiflora montana Holm-Niels. & Lawesson

Species of vine

Passiflora montana is a species of plant in the family Passifloraceae. It is endemic to Ecuador. This Passiflora is related most closely to Passiflora palenquensis, Passiflora deltoifolia, and Passiflora pergrandis.

The Latin specific epithet montana refers to mountains or coming from mountains.
