= D. montana =

D. montana may refer to:

- Deconica montana, mountain moss psilocybe, a mushroom
- Deudorix montana, a butterfly in the family Lycaenidae
- Downingia montana, the Sierra calicoflower, a flowering plant species native to California
- Drepanosticta montana, a damselfly in the family Platystictidae
- Drosophila montana, a fruit fly in the family Drosophilidae
