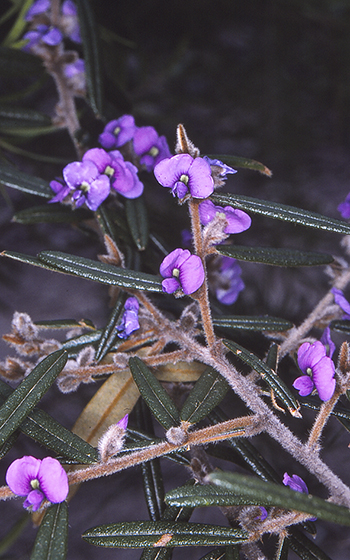

Scientific classification
- Kingdom: Plantae
- Clade: Embryophytes
- Clade: Tracheophytes
- Clade: Angiosperms
- Clade: Eudicots
- Clade: Rosids
- Order: Fabales
- Family: Fabaceae
- Subfamily: Faboideae
- Genus: Hovea
- Species: H. purpurea

Binomial name
- Hovea purpurea Sweet

Synonyms
- Hovea beckeri F.Muell.; Hovea longifolia var. lanceolata (Sims) Benth. p.p.; Hovea longifolia var. pannosa (A.Cunn. ex Hook.) Benth. p.p.; Hovea longifolia var. purpurea (Sweet) Domin p.p.; Hovea longifolia var. lanceolata auct. non (Sims) Benth.: Black, J.M. (1924); Hovea longifolia var. longifolia auct. non R.Br.: Jessop, J.P. & Toelken, H.R. in Jessop, J.P. & Toelken, H.R. (ed.) (1986)

= Hovea purpurea =

Velvet hovea

Species of legume

Hovea purpurea, commonly known as velvet hovea, is a flowering plant in the family Fabaceae. It is an upright shrub with narrow leaves, purple pea flowers and stems with matted hairs. It grows in New South Wales, Victoria and South Australia.

== Description ==
Hovea purpurea is a shrub to 3 m (9.8 ft) high, stems with brownish to dark grey, short, densely matted, curled or more or less straight, flattened to nearly spreading hairs. The leaves strap like to narrow-elliptic, 1.2–7 cm (0.47–2.76 in) long and 4–17 mm (0.16–0.67 in) wide, flat either side of a recessed midrib, blunt to sharp at the base, margins curved, apex rounded or almost pointed. The leaf upper surface a shiny green, smooth except for hairs on midrib, under surface thickly covered with cream-brown, curly hairs, faintly veined, midrib hairs thick and brown-orange. The inflorescence usually in clusters of 1-3 mauve, purple or occasionally white flowers, bracts broadly egg-shaped to oval, 2.2–3.5 mm (0.087–0.138 in) long and inserted near base of the pedicel that is about 2.5 mm (0.098 in) long. The standard petal is 11.5–17 mm (0.45–0.67 in) long and 10–15 mm (0.39–0.59 in) wide, with darker purple markings and a pale yellow centre, the wing 10.3–15.5 mm (0.41–0.61 in) long and 3.5–4.5 mm (0.14–0.18 in) wide, keel 3.5–4.5 mm (0.14–0.18 in) wide. Flowering occurs from October to December and the fruit is an elliptic shaped pod, 10–17 mm (0.39–0.67 in) long, 8–11 mm (0.31–0.43 in) deep, sessile and moderately covered with pale hairs.

== Taxonomy and naming ==
Hovea purpurea was first formally described in 1827 by Robert Sweet and the description was published in Flora Australasica. The specific epithet (purpurea) means "purple".

== Distribution and habitat ==
Velvet hovea grows on banks near streams and rocky ledges in forests and woodland. In New South Wales, it occurs from Mt Kaputar to the south-eastern corner of the state. In Victoria, on the upper Genoa River in East Gippsland and in South Australia, at Mount Remarkable.
