= Gorybia montana =

Scientific classification
- Kingdom: Animalia
- Phylum: Arthropoda
- Clade: Pancrustacea
- Class: Insecta
- Order: Coleoptera
- Suborder: Polyphaga
- Infraorder: Cucujiformia
- Family: Cerambycidae
- Genus: Gorybia
- Species: G. montana

Binomial name
- Gorybia montana Martins & Galileo, 2007

Species of beetle

Gorybia montana is a species of beetle in the family Cerambycidae.
