= Lindernia montana =

Scientific classification
- Kingdom: Plantae
- Clade: Tracheophytes
- Clade: Angiosperms
- Clade: Eudicots
- Clade: Asterids
- Order: Lamiales
- Family: Linderniaceae
- Genus: Lindernia
- Species: L. montana

Binomial name
- Lindernia montana (Blume) Koord.

Species of flowering plant

Lindernia montana is a plant species in the Linderniaceae family. It is most commonly seen in China, where many plants are named according to their appearances. Since Lindernia montana resembles the tail of dogs, so its Chinese name is "gou mao cao", which has the meaning of "grass that looks like dog's fur". For its unique appearance, its profile was once popularly printed on China, especially during the Ming Dynasty.

== Description ==
Lindernia montana often grows to the height of between 20 and 40 centimetres. It is covered by white glittering setae. Its stems crookedly crawl in soil. There are large space between every two stem joints. Its fringing roots grow on these joints. L. montana has few branches. Its leaves always grow in pairs and almost have no petiole. The size and shape of its leaves vary a lot. The size can be 2 to 6 centimetres long and 0.7 to 2.5 centimetres in width, and the shape can be shape of an egg. The bottom of its leave is wedge-shaped or heart-shaped, while the top of it is short and needle-shaped. The edge of its leave is zigzagged. And every side of it is covered by little white hairs. The flower of L. montana usually grows on top of its stem and is generally small. It mostly grows in groups and is umbrella-shaped, but sometimes also grows solitary. The flower is about 2.5 centimetres long, with white soft hairs. The stamen is divided into 5 shares which have the shape of needle. The corolla is purple or yellowish white, having the length of about 1 centimetre. The fruit of L. montana is oval and is shorter than its calyx. The flowering phase can last 7 up to 10 months, while the fruiting phase last 9 to 11 months.

== Taxonomy ==
The Latin specific epithet montana refers to mountains or coming from mountains.

== Distribution and habitat ==
Lindernia montana is a plant native to the southern part of China such as Jiangxi, Fujian, Guangdong, Guangxi and Yunnan provinces. It can also be found in other South Asian countries such as India and Indonesia. It grows in spring and summer at places where the altitude ranges from 900 to 1400 meters. At places such as deserted fields, hills where there is plenty of sunshine, damp valleys, edge of forests, and sides of rivers, it can most likely be found.

== Use ==
Lindernia montana is a herb commonly used in traditional Chinese medicine. It is thought to have the function of clearing heat and toxic materials in the body, invigorating the circulation of blood, and eliminating swelling. So it is widely used to cure diseases like acute mastitis, swelling caused by skin ulcer and traumatic injuries.
