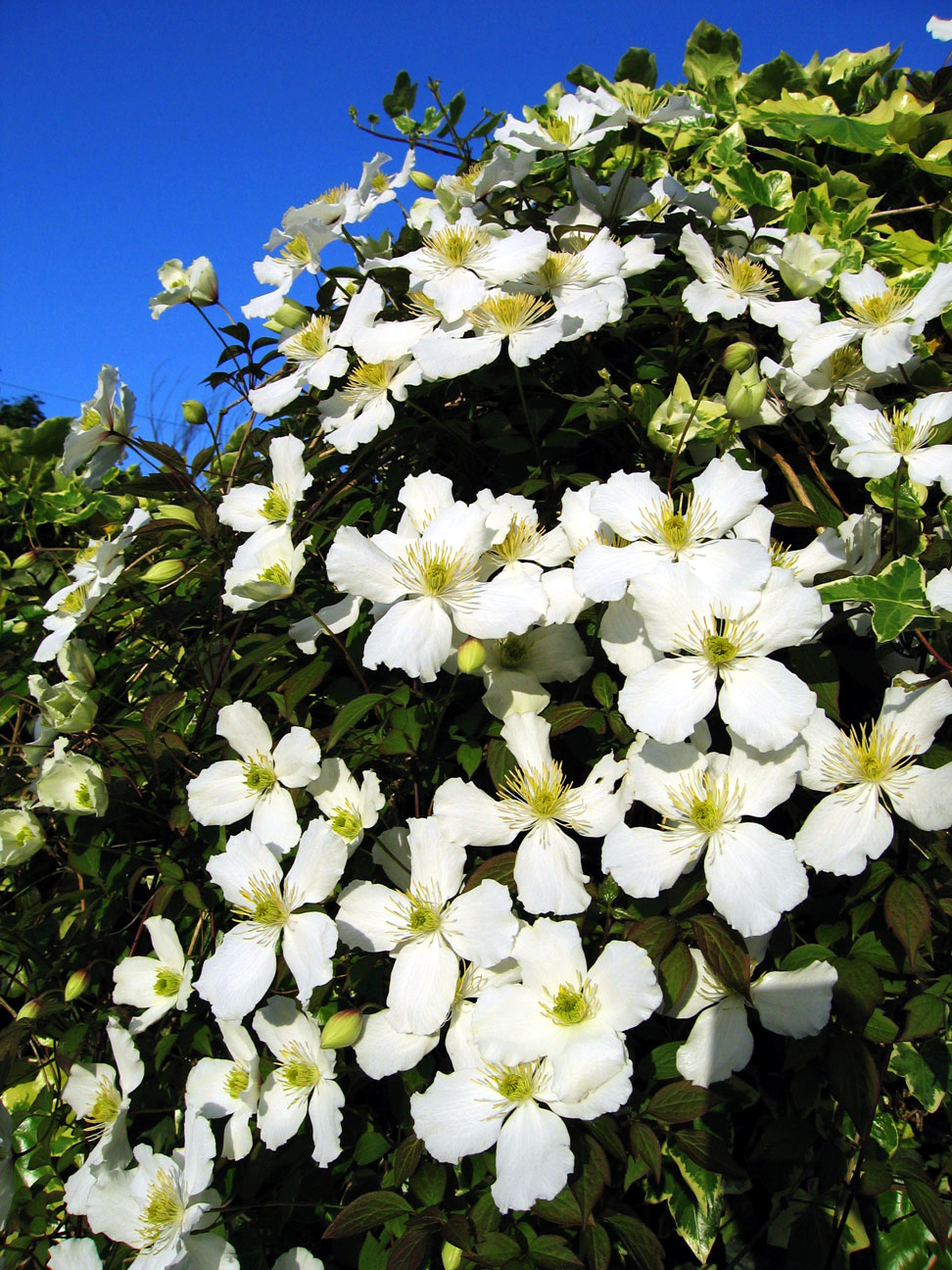

Scientific classification
- Kingdom: Plantae
- Clade: Tracheophytes
- Clade: Angiosperms
- Clade: Eudicots
- Order: Ranunculales
- Family: Ranunculaceae
- Genus: Clematis
- Species: C. montana

Binomial name
- Clematis montana Buch.-Ham. ex DC.

Synonyms
- Anemone curta Wall.; C. anemoniflora D.Don nom. illeg.; C. chrysocoma var. glabrescens H.F.Comber; C. insularialpina Hayata; C. kuntziana H.Lév. & Vaniot; C. punduana Wall. nom. inval.; C. spooneri var. subglabra S.Y.Hu

= Clematis montana =

Species of plant

Clematis montana, the mountain clematis, also Himalayan clematis or anemone clematis, is a flowering plant in the buttercup family Ranunculaceae. A vigorous deciduous climber, in late spring it is covered with a mass of small blooms for a period of about four weeks. The odorous flowers are white or pink, four-petalled, with prominent yellow anthers. It is native to mountain areas of Asia from Afghanistan to Taiwan.

== Cultivation ==
Clematis montana is a popular garden plant in temperate regions, with the ability to scramble up and over unsightly features such as sheds and fences. Left unchecked it can grow to 12 m (39 ft). The plant attracts bees, butterflies, and hummingbirds. Numerous varieties and cultivars have been bred for horticultural use, including:

- C. montana 'Alexander'
- C. montana var. grandiflora AGM with larger flowers than the species
- C. montana var. rubens
  - 'Broughton Star' AGM - double, deep pink flowers
  - 'Elizabeth' - with pale pink flowers
  - 'Freda'
  - 'Pink Perfection'
  - 'Tetrarose' AGM has deep pink flowers.
- C. montana var. wilsonii - later flowering, chocolate scented

Those cultivars marked AGM have gained the Royal Horticultural Society's Award of Garden Merit.

== Etymology ==
Clematis is the Greek name for several climbing plants, and is a diminutive of klema, meaning "vine shoot".

The Latin specific epithet montana refers to mountains or coming from mountains.

== Collections ==
The UK national collection of Clematis montana is held at By The Way, at Woodfalls, near Salisbury, Wiltshire, within the New Forest National Park. Much of the collection has been propagated from British Clematis Society seeds.
