= T. montana =

T. montana may refer to:

- Tegenaria montana, a funnel-web spider
- Thamnosma montana, a shrub, turpentine broom
- Thermopsis montana, mountain goldenbanner
- Thyretes montana, a moth of the family Erebidae
- Tillandsia montana, a plant of the family Bromeliaceae
- Tinguarra montana, a plant of the family Apiaceae
- Tolidostena montana, a beetle of the family Mordellidae
- Tolpia montana, a moth of the family Erebidae
- Trichosalpinx montana, an orchid
- Tricula montana, a freshwater snail
- Trifurcula montana, a moth of the family Nepticulidae
- Triteleia montana, mountain triteleia, a plant of the family Asparagaceae
- Trochocarpa montana, mountain tree heath, an Australian shrub
- Tupaia montana, the mountain treeshrew
