= Patrick Montan =

Swiss musician (born 1976)

Patrick Montan (born 1976) is a Swiss harpsichordist and musicologist.

Born in Lausanne, Mountain studied piano from the age of eight at Geneva Conservatory. Fascinated by the works of Johann Sebastian Bach, when he was seventeen he decided to study the harpsichord and its huge repertoire.

In June 2000 the Conservatoire Supérieur de Musique de Genève, where he was in the class of Christiane Jaccottet, awarded him first prize in harpsichord virtuosity. He was the last of Jaccottet's pupils to be entirely trained by her. In October 2000 he obtained a degree in literature, specialising in musicology, from the University of Geneva.

In June 2002 Patrick Montan obtained a post-graduate diploma in harpsichord studies with Bob van Asperen at the Amsterdamse Hogeschool voor de Kunsten. He also followed the master courses of Christopher Hogwood, Christiane Jaccottet, Bob van Asperen and Gustav Leonhardt. In 2003 the Leenaards Foundation awarded him a cultural scholarship.

Concurrently with his studies and teaching the harpsichord and the clavichord, Patrick Montan has appeared in several European countries (France, Germany, Austria, Holland, Britain, Switzerland etc.) mostly as a soloist, but also as a continuo player of chamber music. He recorded on the original harpsichord by Ioannes Ruckers (Antwerp, 1624) in the Unterlinden Museum in Colmar works by Jan Pieterszoon Sweelinck, Johann Jakob Froberger, François Couperin and Johann Sebastian Bach.

On the musicology side, Patrick Montan has written a monograph entitled "L’Art de toucher le clavecin de François Couperin. Autour du doigté", in which he succeeded in reconstituting Couperin's original fingering for the harpsichord pieces from Couperin's book of the same name.
