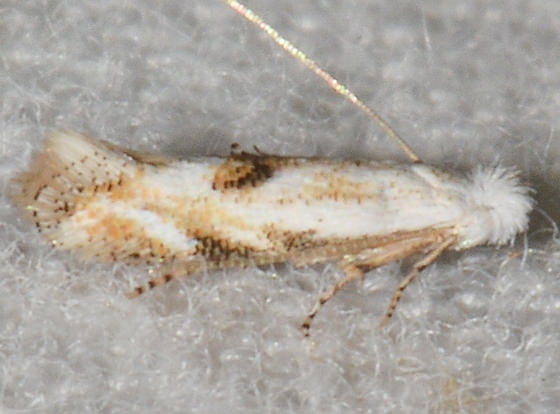

Scientific classification
- Kingdom: Animalia
- Phylum: Arthropoda
- Clade: Pancrustacea
- Class: Insecta
- Order: Lepidoptera
- Family: Bucculatricidae
- Genus: Bucculatrix
- Species: B. montana

Binomial name
- Bucculatrix montana Braun, 1920

= Bucculatrix montana =

Species of moth

Bucculatrix montana, the mountain bucculatrix, is a moth in the family Bucculatricidae. It was described by Annette Frances Braun in 1920 and is found in North America, where it has been recorded from Ontario, Nova Scotia, Indiana, Maryland, Virginia, Ohio, Michigan, Maine, New York, New Jersey, Massachusetts and Georgia. It is known to use sweet gale as its host plant.
