= R. montana =

R. montana may refer to:

- Ramanella montana, Jerdon's Narrow-mouthed Frog
- Roupala montana, shrub or tree in the family Proteaceae
