= I. montana =

I. montana may refer to:

- Ilex montana, mountain winterberry
- Iolaus montana, a butterfly of the family Lycaenidae
- Isonandra montana, a small tree of the family Sapotaceae
