= Stigmella montana =

Scientific classification
- Kingdom: Animalia
- Phylum: Arthropoda
- Class: Insecta
- Order: Lepidoptera
- Family: Nepticulidae
- Genus: Stigmella
- Species: S. montana

Binomial name
- Stigmella montana Puplesis, 1991

Species of moth

Stigmella montana is a moth of the family Nepticulidae. It is found in Kazakhstan and Tajikistan.
