= N. montana =

N. montana may refer to:

- Neogurelca montana, a moth of the family Sphingidae
- Neriene montana, a spider of the family Linyphiidae
- Notelaea montana, the narrow-leaved maire, a New Zealand tree
- Nyctemera montana, a moth of the family Erebidae
