= O. montana =

O. montana may refer to:

- Odontopodisma montana, insect in family Acrididae
- Oxalis montana, Mountain woodsorrel
