= Montano =

Montano in Italian, both Montano and Montaño in Spanish, is a surname.

It may refer to:

- Aldo Montano (fencer born 1910), Italian fencer
- Aldo Montano (fencer born 1978), Italian fencer and grandson of the above fencer
- Alicia Gómez Montano (1955–2020), Spanish journalist
- Mario Aldo Montano, Italian fencer and son of the fencer born in 1910
- Cesar Montano, multi-awarded Filipino actor and film director
- Jimmy Montano Gutierrez (died 2007), Belizean shooting victim
- Justiniano Montano (1905–2005), Filipino politician
- Linda Montano, American contemporary feminist performance artist
- Machel Montano (born 1974), Trinidad and Tobago soca singer, record producer and songwriter
- Mark Montano, American interior designer, artist, writer and TV personality
- Severino Montano (1915–1980), Filipino playwright, writer, director and actor
- Benito Arias Montano (1527–1598) (not Montaño), Spanish orientalist
  - Also a governor and a soldier of the same name and same period
  - es:Montano (desambiguación) rarer Spanish surnames as Montano, no ñ.

== See also ==
- Montaño, common Spanish surname
  - Alysia Montaño née Johnson, American track and field athlete, 800 metres national champion
  - Cristian Montaño, Colombian football player
  - Miguel Montaño (born 1991), Colombian footballer who plays for Seattle Sounders FC
