= Schrankia intermedialis =

Scientific classification
- Kingdom: Animalia
- Phylum: Arthropoda
- Clade: Pancrustacea
- Class: Insecta
- Order: Lepidoptera
- Superfamily: Noctuoidea
- Family: Erebidae
- Genus: Schrankia
- Species: S. intermedialis

Binomial name
- Schrankia intermedialis Reid, 1972

Species of moth

Schrankia intermedialis is a species of moth of the family Erebidae first described by J. Reid in 1972. It is found in Sweden.

Michael Fibiger treats this taxon as an interspecific hybrid of Schrankia costaestrigalis and Schrankia taenialis.
