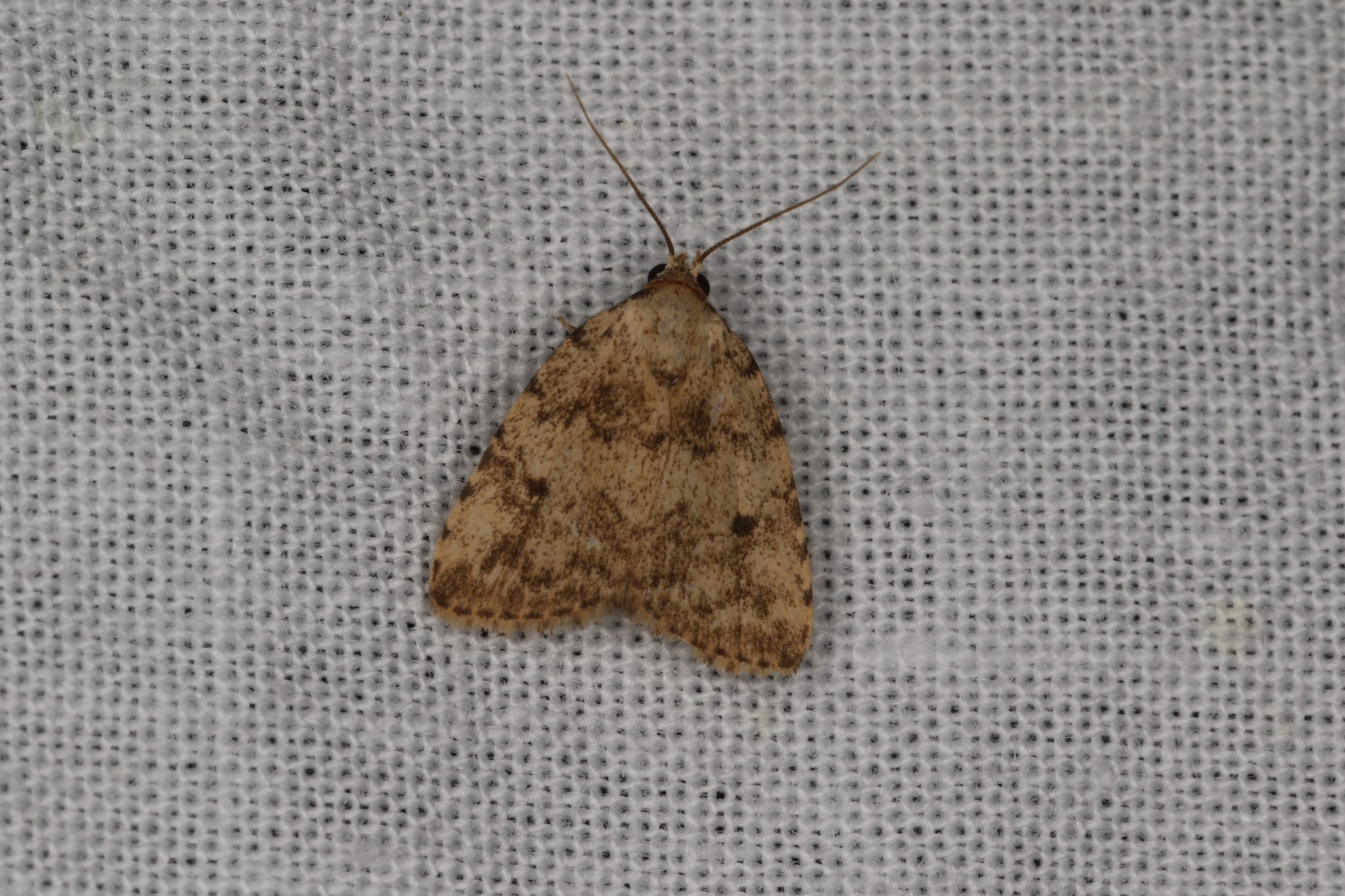
- Tolpia conscitulana

Scientific classification
- Kingdom: Animalia
- Phylum: Arthropoda
- Class: Insecta
- Order: Lepidoptera
- Superfamily: Noctuoidea
- Family: Erebidae
- Subfamily: Hypenodinae
- Tribe: Micronoctuini
- Subtribe: Pollexina
- Genus: Tolpia; Walker, 1863

= Tolpia =

Genus of moths

Tolpia is a genus of moths of the family Erebidae erected by Francis Walker in 1863. The genus used to be included in the family Noctuidae.

== Species ==
The odor species group

- Tolpia odor Fibiger, 2007
- Tolpia fyani Fibiger, 2007

The unguis species group

- Tolpia sikkimi Fibiger, 2007
- Tolpia unguis Fibiger, 2007
- Tolpia buthani Fibiger, 2007
- Tolpia indiai Fibiger, 2007
- Tolpia andamani Fibiger, 2007
- Tolpia hainanensis Fibiger, 2010
- Tolpia paraunguis Fibiger, 2010
- Tolpia mons Fibiger, 2010

The peniculus species group

- Tolpia peniculus Fibiger, 2007
- Tolpia kampungi Fibiger, 2007
- Tolpia multiprocessa Fibiger, 2008

The conscitulana species group

- Tolpia orientis Fibiger, 2007
- Tolpia alexmadseni Fibiger, 2007
- Tolpia talauti Fibiger, 2007
- Tolpia palawani Fibiger, 2007
- Tolpia conscitulana Walker, 1863

The crispus species group

- Tolpia crispus Fibiger, 2007
- Tolpia knudlarseni Fibiger, 2007

The montana species group

- Tolpia montana Fibiger, 2007
- Tolpia sarawakia Fibiger, 2007
- Tolpia parasarawakia Fibiger, 2007
- Tolpia kuchingia Fibiger, 2007
- Tolpia kalimantania Fibiger, 2011

The mccabei species group

- Tolpia mccabei Fibiger, 2007

== Former species ==
- Tolpia myops Hampson, 1907
