= Pseudomicrodes =

Scientific classification
- Kingdom: Animalia
- Phylum: Arthropoda
- Class: Insecta
- Order: Lepidoptera
- Superfamily: Noctuoidea
- Family: Noctuidae
- Subfamily: Acontiinae
- Genus: Pseudomicrodes; Hampson, 1910

Synonyms
- Pseudomicra Rebel, 1907

Genus of moths

Pseudomicrodes is a genus of moths of the family Noctuidae. The genus was erected by George Hampson in 1910.

== Species ==
- Pseudomicrodes atrifusa Hampson, 1910 Sri Lanka
- Pseudomicrodes decolor (Rebel, 1907) Yemen (Socotra)
- Pseudomicrodes ecrufa (Hampson, 1905) South Africa
- Pseudomicrodes fuscipars Hampson, 1910 South Africa
- Pseudomicrodes mediorufa Hampson, 1910 South Africa
- Pseudomicrodes namibiensis (Hacker, 2004) Namibia
- Pseudomicrodes ochrocraspis Hampson, 1910 South Africa
- Pseudomicrodes polysticta Hampson, 1910 Ghana
- Pseudomicrodes rufigrisea Hampson, 1910 Kenya, Ethiopia
- Pseudomicrodes scoparioides (Hacker, 2004) Namibia
- Pseudomicrodes varia Berio, 1944 Ethiopia, Kenya
