= Disca hackeri =

Scientific classification
- Domain: Eukaryota
- Kingdom: Animalia
- Phylum: Arthropoda
- Class: Insecta
- Order: Lepidoptera
- Superfamily: Noctuoidea
- Family: Erebidae
- Genus: Disca
- Species: D. hackeri

Binomial name
- Disca hackeri Fibiger, 2007

Species of moth

Disca hackeri is a moth of the family Erebidae first described by Michael Fibiger in 2007. It is known from Borneo.

The wingspan is about 11 mm. The forewing is beige brown. The hindwing is grey and the underside unicolorous brown.
