= Tolpia kuchingia =

Scientific classification
- Domain: Eukaryota
- Kingdom: Animalia
- Phylum: Arthropoda
- Class: Insecta
- Order: Lepidoptera
- Superfamily: Noctuoidea
- Family: Erebidae
- Genus: Tolpia
- Species: T. kuchingia

Binomial name
- Tolpia kuchingia Fibiger, 2007

Species of moth

Tolpia kuchingia is a moth of the family Erebidae first described by Michael Fibiger in 2007. It is known from Borneo.

The wingspan is 13–14 mm. The hindwing is grey brown and the underside unicolorous brown.
