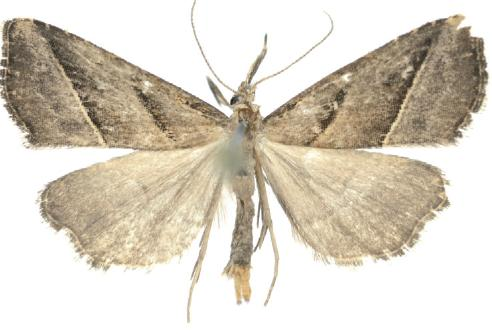
- Schrankia pelicano

Scientific classification
- Domain: Eukaryota
- Kingdom: Animalia
- Phylum: Arthropoda
- Class: Insecta
- Order: Lepidoptera
- Superfamily: Noctuoidea
- Family: Erebidae
- Subfamily: Hypenodinae
- Genus: Schrankia; Hübner, [1825]

Synonyms
- Hypenodes Guenée, 1854 (preocc. Doubleday, 1850); Hypenopsis Dyar, 1913; Hypendalia Berio, 1962; Costankia Beck, 1996

= Schrankia =

Genus of moths

Schrankia is a genus of moths of the family Erebidae. It was described by Jacob Hübner in 1825.

== Taxonomy ==
The genus has previously been classified in the subfamily Hypenodinae of the family Noctuidae.

== Species ==
- Schrankia altivolans (Butler, 1880)
- Schrankia aurantilineata (Hampson, 1896)
- Schrankia balneorum (Alphéraky, 1880)
- Schrankia bilineata Galsworthy, 1997
- Schrankia boisea Holloway, 1977
- Schrankia bruntoni Holloway, 2008
- Schrankia calligrapha Snellen, 1880
- Schrankia capnophanes (Turner, 1939)
- Schrankia cheesmanae Holloway, 1977
- Schrankia costaestrigalis Stephens, 1834 – pinion-streaked snout
- Schrankia croceipicta (Hampson, 1893)
- Schrankia daviesi Holloway, 1977
- Schrankia dimorpha Inoue, 1979
- Schrankia dochmographa D. S. Fletcher, 1957
- Schrankia dusunorum Holloway, 2008
- Schrankia erromanga Holloway, 1977
- Schrankia flualis (Schaus, 1916)
- Schrankia furoroa Robinson, 1975
- Schrankia howarthi D. Davis & Medeiros, 2009
- Schrankia intermedialis Reid, 1972
- Schrankia karkara Holloway, 1977
- Schrankia kogii Inoue, 1979
- Schrankia macula Druce, 1891 – black-spotted schrankia moth
- Schrankia masuii Inoue, 1979
- Schrankia microscopica (Berio, 1962)
- Schrankia musalis (Schaus, 1916)
- Schrankia namibiensis Hacker, 2004
- Schrankia nokowula Holloway, 1977
- Schrankia nouankaoa Holloway, 1977
- Schrankia obstructalis (Walker, [1866])
- Schrankia pelicano Pekarsky, 2012
- Schrankia scoparioides Hacker, 2004
- Schrankia seinoi Inoue, 1979
- Schrankia separatalis (Herz, 1904)
- Schrankia solitaria D. S. Fletcher, 1961
- Schrankia spiralaedeagus Holloway, 2008
- Schrankia tabwemasana Holloway, 1977
- Schrankia taenialis Hübner, [1809] – white-line snout moth
- Schrankia tamsi Holloway, 1977
- Schrankia taona (Tams, 1935)
- Schrankia vitiensis Robinson, 1975
