= Tolpia multiprocessa =

Scientific classification
- Kingdom: Animalia
- Phylum: Arthropoda
- Clade: Pancrustacea
- Class: Insecta
- Order: Lepidoptera
- Superfamily: Noctuoidea
- Family: Erebidae
- Genus: Tolpia
- Species: T. multiprocessa

Binomial name
- Tolpia multiprocessa Fibiger, 2008

Species of moth

Tolpia multiprocessa is a moth of the family Erebidae first described by Michael Fibiger in 2008. It is found in Malaysia.
