= Schrankia furoroa =

Scientific classification
- Domain: Eukaryota
- Kingdom: Animalia
- Phylum: Arthropoda
- Class: Insecta
- Order: Lepidoptera
- Superfamily: Noctuoidea
- Family: Erebidae
- Genus: Schrankia
- Species: S. furoroa

Binomial name
- Schrankia furoroa Robinson, 1975

Species of moth

Schrankia furoroa is a species of moth of the family Erebidae first described by Robinson in 1975. It is found on Fiji.
