= Mediala spectaculoides =

Scientific classification
- Domain: Eukaryota
- Kingdom: Animalia
- Phylum: Arthropoda
- Class: Insecta
- Order: Lepidoptera
- Superfamily: Noctuoidea
- Family: Erebidae
- Genus: Mediala
- Species: M. spectaculoides

Binomial name
- Mediala spectaculoides Fibiger, 2008

Species of moth

Mediala spectaculoides is a moth of the family Erebidae first described by Michael Fibiger in 2008. It is known from Sri Lanka.

The wingspan is about 14 mm.
