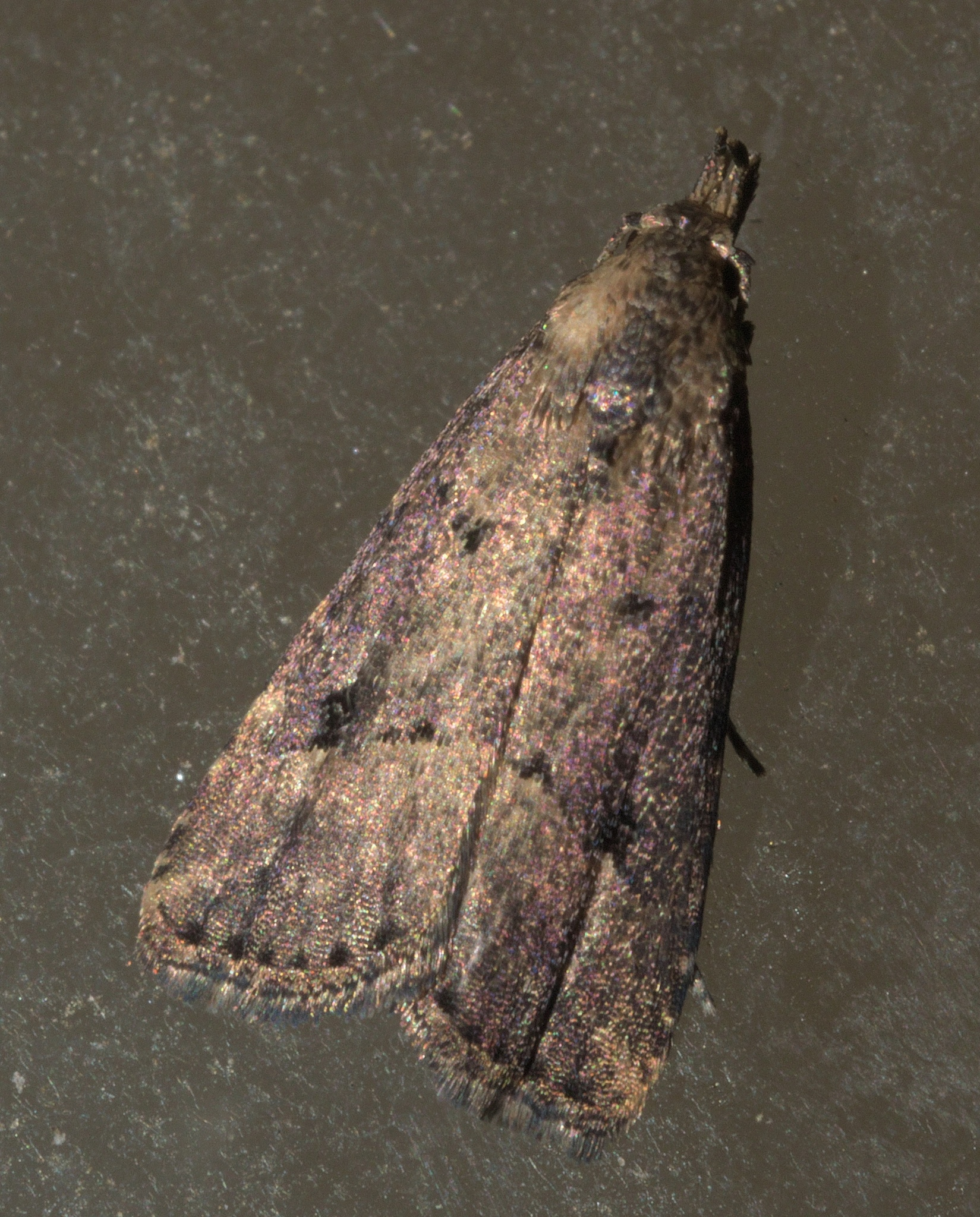
- Hypenopsis macula, Oklahoma

Scientific classification
- Kingdom: Animalia
- Phylum: Arthropoda
- Clade: Pancrustacea
- Class: Insecta
- Order: Lepidoptera
- Superfamily: Noctuoidea
- Family: Erebidae
- Genus: Schrankia
- Species: S. macula

Binomial name
- Schrankia macula (H. Druce, 1891)

Synonyms
- Hypenopsis macula H. Druce, 1891

= Schrankia macula =

Black-spotted schrankia moth

Species of insect

Schrankia macula, the black-spotted schrankia moth, is a moth of the family Erebidae. The species was first described by Herbert Druce in 1891. It is found from North America (including Alabama, Arizona, California, Florida, Georgia, Indiana, Louisiana, Maryland, Massachusetts, Mississippi, Missouri, North Carolina, Oklahoma, South Carolina, Tennessee, Texas, and Virginia) to Central America.

The wingspan is 13–18 mm.

The larvae feed on a species of bracket fungus.
