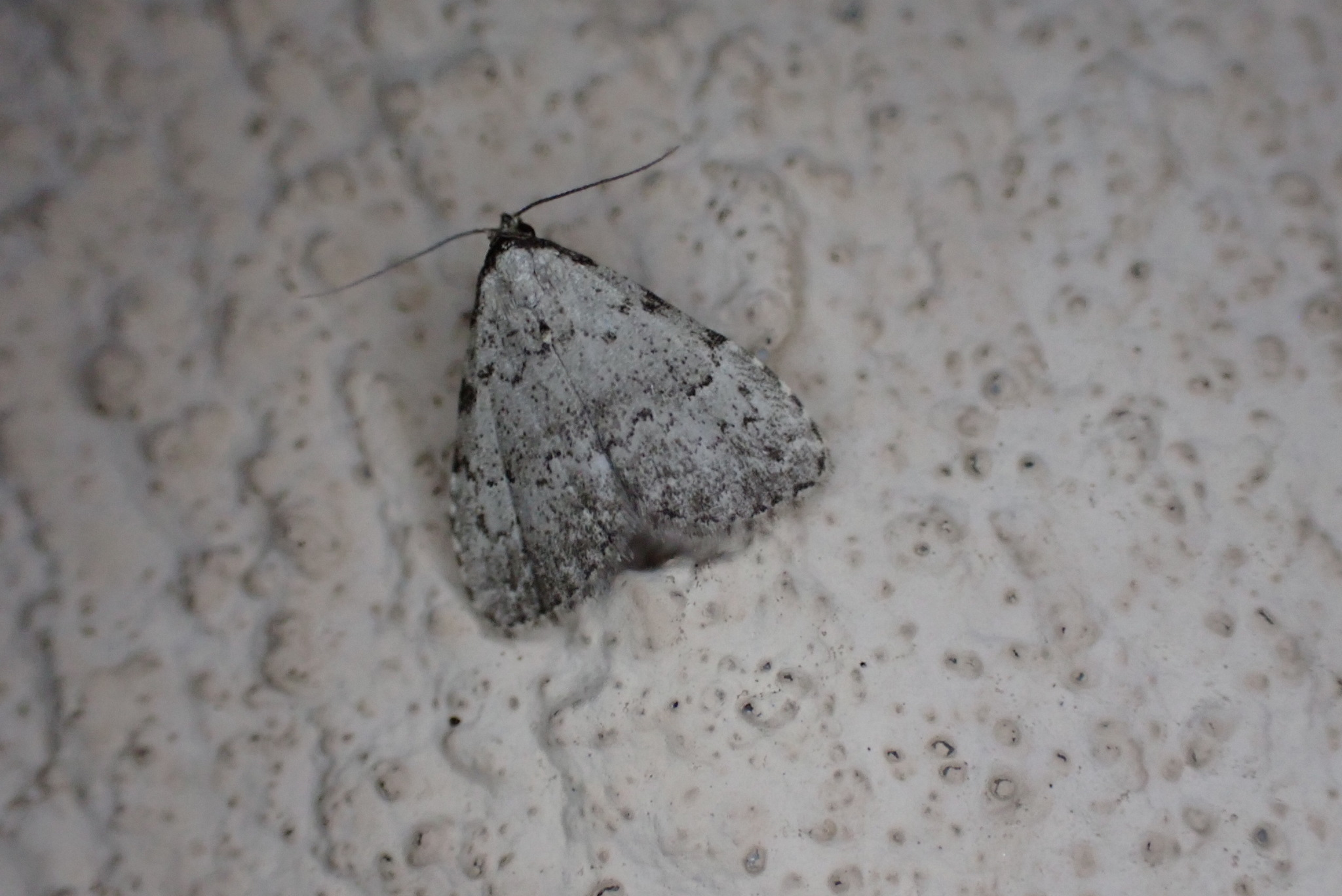
- Dyspyralis puncticosta

Scientific classification
- Kingdom: Animalia
- Phylum: Arthropoda
- Class: Insecta
- Order: Lepidoptera
- Superfamily: Noctuoidea
- Family: Erebidae
- Subfamily: Hypenodinae
- Genus: Dyspyralis; Warren, 1891

= Dyspyralis =

Genus of moths

Dyspyralis is a moth genus in the family Erebidae. The genus was erected by Warren in 1891.

== Species ==
- Dyspyralis humerata Smith, 1908
- Dyspyralis illocata Warren, 1891 – visitation moth
- Dyspyralis immuna Smith, 1908
- Dyspyralis nigellus Strecker, 1900 (sometimes spelled as Dyspyralis nigella)
- Dyspyralis noloides Barnes & McDunnough, 1916
- Dyspyralis puncticosta J. B. Smith, 1908 – spot-edged dyspyralis moth
- Dyspyralis serratula Bethune-Baker, 1908
