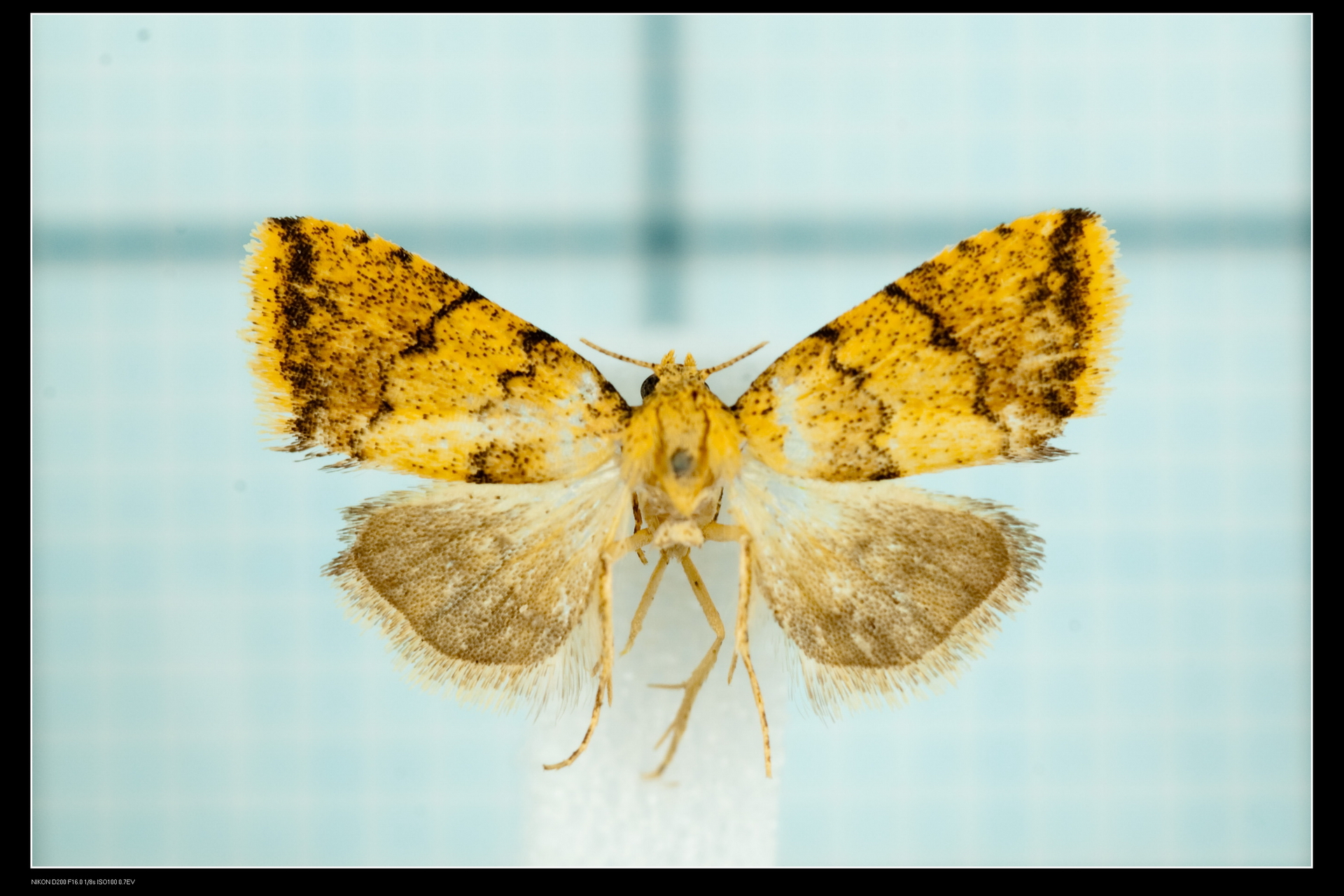
- Genus of Anachrostis

Scientific classification
- Kingdom: Animalia
- Phylum: Arthropoda
- Clade: Pancrustacea
- Class: Insecta
- Order: Lepidoptera
- Superfamily: Noctuoidea
- Family: Erebidae
- Subfamily: Hypenodinae
- Genus: Anachrostis; Hampson, 1893

= Anachrostis =

Genus of moths

Anachrostis is a genus of moths of the family Erebidae.

== Taxonomy ==
The genus has previously been classified in the subfamily Catocalinae of the family Noctuidae.

== Description ==
Palpi upturned with second joint reaching vertex of head. Antennae minutely ciliated. Forewings with vein 5 angle of cell. Vein 6 from below upper angle and vein 7 from the angle. Veins 8 and 10 stalked and vein 9 absent. Hindwings with stalked veins 3 and 4, whereas vein 5 absent.

== Species ==
- Anachrostis amamiana Sugi, 1982
- Anachrostis fulvicilia Hampson, 1926
- Anachrostis indistincta Wileman & South, 1917
- Anachrostis marginata Wileman & South, 1917
- Anachrostis metaphaea Hampson, 1926
- Anachrostis minutissima Sugi, 1982
- Anachrostis nigripuncta Hampson, 1893
- Anachrostis nigripunctalis (Wileman, 1911)
- Anachrostis ochracea Hampson, 1926
- Anachrostis rufula Hampson, 1926
- Anachrostis siccana (Walker, 1863)
- Anachrostis straminea Rothschild, 1915
