= Dyspyralis noloides =

Scientific classification
- Domain: Eukaryota
- Kingdom: Animalia
- Phylum: Arthropoda
- Class: Insecta
- Order: Lepidoptera
- Superfamily: Noctuoidea
- Family: Erebidae
- Genus: Dyspyralis
- Species: D. noloides

Binomial name
- Dyspyralis noloides Barnes & McDunnough, 1916

Species of moth

Dyspyralis noloides is a species of moth in the family Erebidae. It was first described by William Barnes and James Halliday McDunnough in 1916 and it is found in North America.

The MONA or Hodges number for Dyspyralis noloides is 8429.
