= Tolpia conscitulana =

Scientific classification
- Kingdom: Animalia
- Phylum: Arthropoda
- Clade: Pancrustacea
- Class: Insecta
- Order: Lepidoptera
- Superfamily: Noctuoidea
- Family: Erebidae
- Genus: Tolpia
- Species: T. conscitulana

Binomial name
- Tolpia conscitulana Walker, 1863

Species of moth

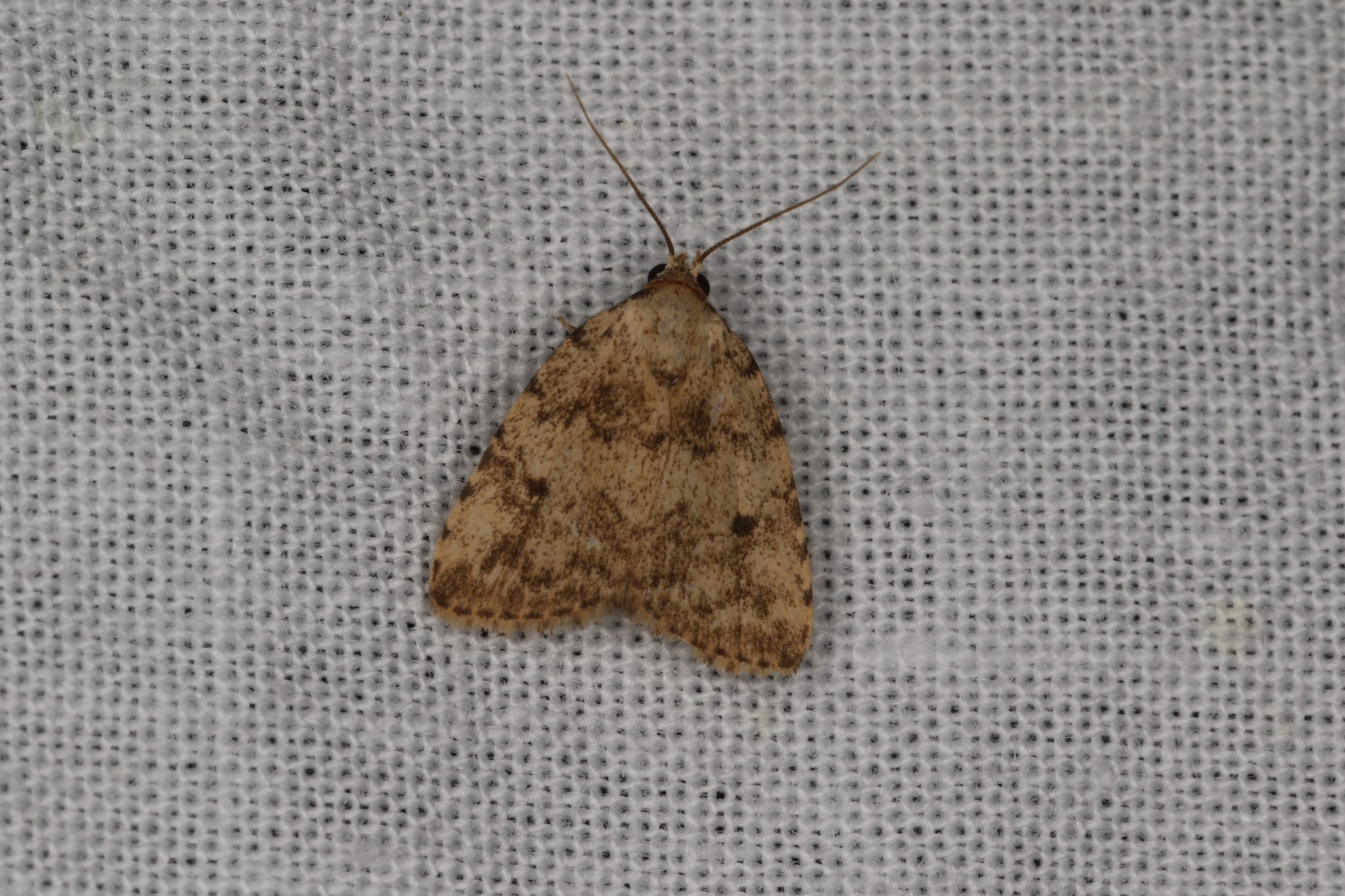
A photograph of the Tolpia conscitulana moth resting on a textured fabric surface

Tolpia conscitulana is a moth of the family Erebidae first described by Francis Walker in 1863. It is known from Borneo.
