= Melaleucia obliquifasciata =

Scientific classification
- Kingdom: Animalia
- Phylum: Arthropoda
- Class: Insecta
- Order: Lepidoptera
- Superfamily: Noctuoidea
- Family: Erebidae
- Genus: Melaleucia
- Species: M. obliquifasciata

Binomial name
- Melaleucia obliquifasciata Hampson, 1896

Synonyms
- Nola obliquifasciata Hampson, 1896

Species of moth

Melaleucia obliquifasciata is a moth of the family Erebidae first described by George Hampson in 1896. It is known from south-central Sri Lanka.

There are probably multiple generations per year, with adults recorded in all months except January, February, October and December.

The wingspan is 12–15 mm.
