= Tolpia peniculus =

Scientific classification
- Kingdom: Animalia
- Phylum: Arthropoda
- Clade: Pancrustacea
- Class: Insecta
- Order: Lepidoptera
- Superfamily: Noctuoidea
- Family: Erebidae
- Genus: Tolpia
- Species: T. peniculus

Binomial name
- Tolpia peniculus Fibiger, 2007

Species of moth

Tolpia peniculus is a moth of the family Erebidae first described by Michael Fibiger in 2007. It is known from northern Sumatra.
