= Tolpia sikkimi =

Scientific classification
- Domain: Eukaryota
- Kingdom: Animalia
- Phylum: Arthropoda
- Class: Insecta
- Order: Lepidoptera
- Superfamily: Noctuoidea
- Family: Erebidae
- Genus: Tolpia
- Species: T. sikkimi

Binomial name
- Tolpia sikkimi Fibiger, 2007

Species of moth

Tolpia sikkimi is a moth of the family Erebidae first described by Michael Fibiger in 2007. It is known from Sikkim, India.

The wingspan is about 14 mm. The hindwing is blackish brown and the underside unicolorous brown.
