= Tolpia andamani =

Scientific classification
- Domain: Eukaryota
- Kingdom: Animalia
- Phylum: Arthropoda
- Class: Insecta
- Order: Lepidoptera
- Superfamily: Noctuoidea
- Family: Erebidae
- Genus: Tolpia
- Species: T. andamani

Binomial name
- Tolpia andamani Fibiger, 2007

Species of moth

Tolpia andamani is a moth of the family Erebidae first described by Michael Fibiger in 2007. It is known from the Andaman Islands in the Indian Ocean.

The wingspan is about 13 mm. The underside is unicolorous brown.
