= Schrankia obstructalis =

Scientific classification
- Kingdom: Animalia
- Phylum: Arthropoda
- Class: Insecta
- Order: Lepidoptera
- Superfamily: Noctuoidea
- Family: Erebidae
- Genus: Schrankia
- Species: S. obstructalis

Binomial name
- Schrankia obstructalis (Walker, [1866])

Synonyms
- Pyralis obstructalis Walker, [1866]

Species of moth

Schrankia obstructalis is a species of moth of the family Erebidae first described by Francis Walker in 1866. It is found on Borneo.
