= Tolpia orientis =

Scientific classification
- Domain: Eukaryota
- Kingdom: Animalia
- Phylum: Arthropoda
- Class: Insecta
- Order: Lepidoptera
- Superfamily: Noctuoidea
- Family: Erebidae
- Genus: Tolpia
- Species: T. orientis

Binomial name
- Tolpia orientis Fibiger, 2007

Species of moth

Tolpia orientis is a moth of the family Erebidae first described by Michael Fibiger in 2007. It is known from Thailand.

The wingspan is about 13 mm. The hindwing is dark brown and the underside unicolorous brown.
