= Tahona (disambiguation) =

Tahona is a style of Afro-Cuban music.

Tahona, tajona or taona may also refer to:

- Tahona (from Arab aṭṭaḥúna), a traditional Spanish flour mill or bakery
- Tahona, a village in Kachin State, Burma
- Tajona, a small whip used in Nicaraguan dances
- Schrankia taona, a species of moth
