= Tolpia fyani =

Scientific classification
- Domain: Eukaryota
- Kingdom: Animalia
- Phylum: Arthropoda
- Class: Insecta
- Order: Lepidoptera
- Superfamily: Noctuoidea
- Family: Erebidae
- Genus: Tolpia
- Species: T. fyani

Binomial name
- Tolpia fyani Fibiger, 2007

Species of moth

Tolpia fyani is a moth of the family Erebidae first described by Michael Fibiger in 2007. It is known from north-eastern Vietnam.

The wingspan is about 13 mm. The hindwing is brown and the underside unicolorous brown.
