= Tolpia indiai =

Scientific classification
- Domain: Eukaryota
- Kingdom: Animalia
- Phylum: Arthropoda
- Class: Insecta
- Order: Lepidoptera
- Superfamily: Noctuoidea
- Family: Erebidae
- Genus: Tolpia
- Species: T. indiai

Binomial name
- Tolpia indiai Fibiger, 2007

Species of moth

Tolpia indiai is a moth of the family Erebidae first described by Michael Fibiger in 2007. It is known from the Nilgiri Mountains of India.

The wingspan is about 15 mm. The hindwing is dark brown and the underside unicolorous brown.
