= Schrankia musalis =

Scientific classification
- Domain: Eukaryota
- Kingdom: Animalia
- Phylum: Arthropoda
- Class: Insecta
- Order: Lepidoptera
- Superfamily: Noctuoidea
- Family: Erebidae
- Genus: Schrankia
- Species: S. musalis

Binomial name
- Schrankia musalis (Schaus, 1916)

Synonyms
- Hypenopsis musalis Schaus, 1916

Species of moth

Schrankia musalis is a species of moth of the family Erebidae first described by William Schaus in 1916. It is found in Panama.
