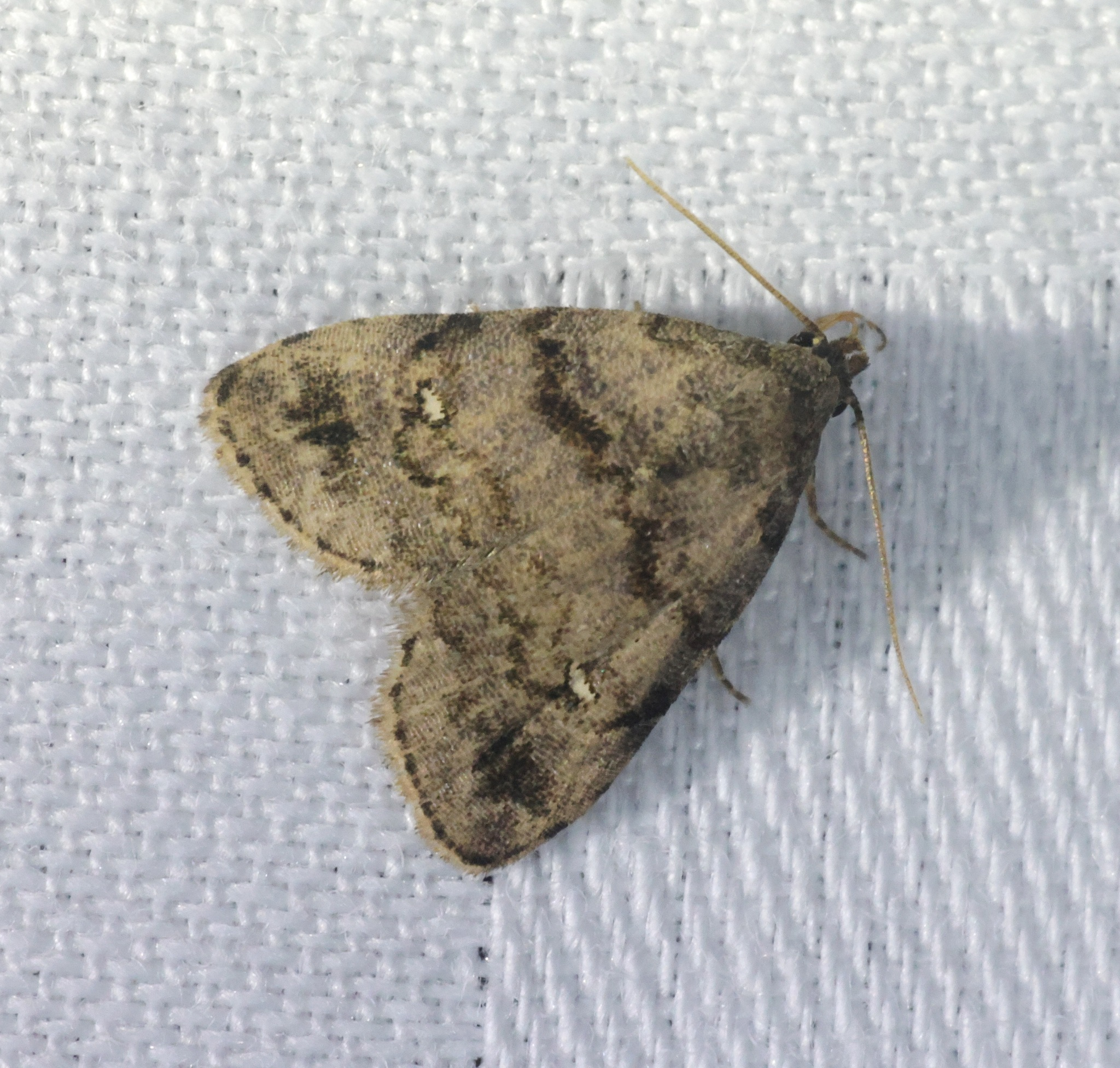
- Bellulia galsworthyi

Scientific classification
- Kingdom: Animalia
- Phylum: Arthropoda
- Clade: Pancrustacea
- Class: Insecta
- Order: Lepidoptera
- Superfamily: Noctuoidea
- Family: Erebidae
- Tribe: Micronoctuini
- Subtribe: Belluliina; Fibiger, 2008

Synonyms
- Belluliinae Fibiger, 2008

= Belluliina =

Subtribe of moths

The Belluliina are a subtribe of moths of the family Erebidae. The clade was described by Michael Fibiger in 2008.

== Taxonomy ==
The subtribe was originally described as the subfamily Belluliinae of the family Micronoctuidae.

== Clades (former tribes) and genera ==
- Bellulia clade Fibiger, 2008
  - Bellulia Fibiger, 2008
- Mediala clade Fibiger, 2008
  - Mediala Fibiger, 2008
  - Melaleucia Hampson, 1900
