= Pollexina =

Scientific classification
- Domain: Eukaryota
- Kingdom: Animalia
- Phylum: Arthropoda
- Class: Insecta
- Order: Lepidoptera
- Superfamily: Noctuoidea
- Family: Erebidae
- Tribe: Micronoctuini
- Subtribe: Pollexina; Fibiger, 2007

Synonyms
- Pollexinae Fibiger, 2007

Subtribe of moths

The Pollexina are a subtribe of moths of the family Erebidae. The genus was erected by Michael Fibiger in 2007.

== Taxonomy ==
The subtribe was originally described as the subfamily Pollexinae of the family Micronoctuidae.

== Genera ==
- Tolpia Walker, 1863
- Disca Fibiger, 2007
- Pollex Fibiger, 2007
