= Tolpia palawani =

Scientific classification
- Domain: Eukaryota
- Kingdom: Animalia
- Phylum: Arthropoda
- Class: Insecta
- Order: Lepidoptera
- Superfamily: Noctuoidea
- Family: Erebidae
- Genus: Tolpia
- Species: T. palawani

Binomial name
- Tolpia palawani Fibiger, 2007

Species of moth

Tolpia palawani is a moth of the family Erebidae first described by Michael Fibiger in 2007. It is known from Palawan in the Philippines.

The wingspan is 11–13 mm. The hindwing is brown and the underside unicolorous brown.
