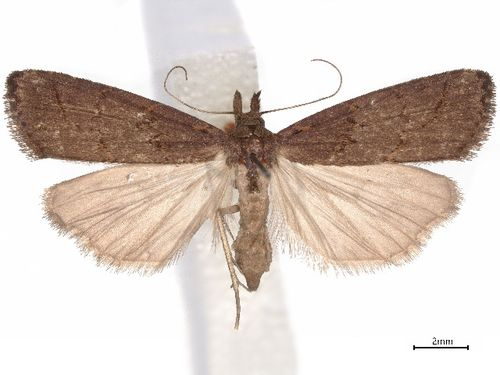

Scientific classification
- Kingdom: Animalia
- Phylum: Arthropoda
- Clade: Pancrustacea
- Class: Insecta
- Order: Lepidoptera
- Superfamily: Noctuoidea
- Family: Erebidae
- Genus: Schrankia
- Species: S. altivolans

Binomial name
- Schrankia altivolans (Butler, 1880)

Synonyms
- Scoparia altivolans Butler, 1880; Hypenodes altivolans; Hypenodes altivolans var. simplex Butler, 1881; Schrankia simplex; Hypenodes oxygramma Meyrick, 1899; Schrankia oxygramma; Hypenodes sarothrura Meyrick, 1899; Schrankia sarothrura; Hypenodes arrhecta Meyrick, 1904; Schrankia arrhecta

= Schrankia altivolans =

Species of moth

Schrankia altivolans is a species of moth of the family Erebidae. It occurs in epigean habitats on Kauai, Oahu, Molokai, Lanai, Maui and Hawaii. It also occasionally occurs in caves on at least Maui and Hawaii.

The length of the forewings is 6–10 mm. Adults and larvae are active throughout the year.
