= Disca tegali =

Scientific classification
- Domain: Eukaryota
- Kingdom: Animalia
- Phylum: Arthropoda
- Class: Insecta
- Order: Lepidoptera
- Superfamily: Noctuoidea
- Family: Erebidae
- Genus: Disca
- Species: D. tegali

Binomial name
- Disca tegali Fibiger, 2007

Species of moth

Disca tegali is a moth of the family Erebidae first described by Michael Fibiger in 2007. It is known from central Java.
