= Tolpia odor =

Scientific classification
- Domain: Eukaryota
- Kingdom: Animalia
- Phylum: Arthropoda
- Class: Insecta
- Order: Lepidoptera
- Superfamily: Noctuoidea
- Family: Erebidae
- Genus: Tolpia
- Species: T. odor

Binomial name
- Tolpia odor Fibiger, 2007

Species of moth

Tolpia odor is a moth of the family Erebidae first described by Michael Fibiger in 2007. It is known from Thailand.

The wingspan is 14–16 mm. The hindwing is brown and the underside unicolorous brown.
