= Tolpia kampungi =

Scientific classification
- Domain: Eukaryota
- Kingdom: Animalia
- Phylum: Arthropoda
- Class: Insecta
- Order: Lepidoptera
- Superfamily: Noctuoidea
- Family: Erebidae
- Genus: Tolpia
- Species: T. kampungi

Binomial name
- Tolpia kampungi Fibiger, 2007

Species of moth

Tolpia kampungi is a moth of the family Erebidae first described by Michael Fibiger in 2007. It is known from the Malaysian state of Pahang.

The wingspan is 14–16 mm. The hindwing is short and dark brown. The underside is unicolorous brown.
