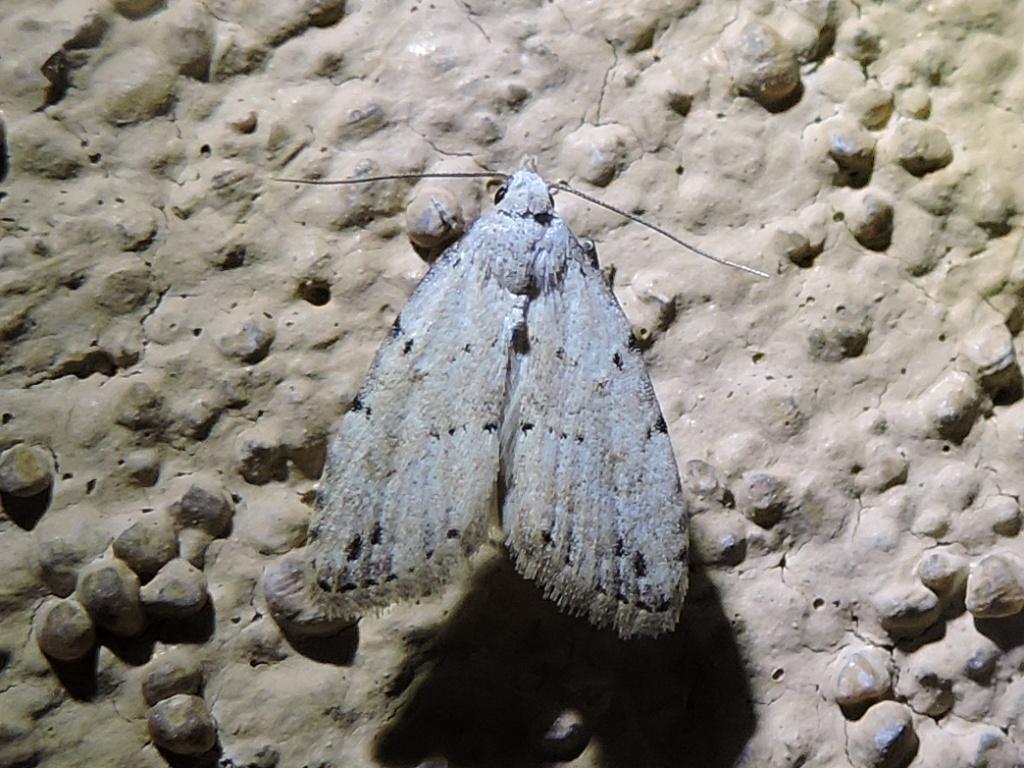

Scientific classification
- Kingdom: Animalia
- Phylum: Arthropoda
- Class: Insecta
- Order: Lepidoptera
- Superfamily: Noctuoidea
- Family: Erebidae
- Subfamily: Hypenodinae
- Genus: Dasyblemma; Dyar, 1923
- Species: D. straminea

Binomial name
- Dasyblemma straminea Dyar, 1923

= Dasyblemma =

Genus of moths

Dasyblemma is a monotypic moth genus of the family Erebidae. Its only species, Dasyblemma straminea, is known from the US state of California, where its type locality was Palm Springs. Both the genus and the species were first described by Harrison Gray Dyar Jr. in 1923.

== Taxonomy ==
The genus has previously been classified in the subfamily Acontiinae of the family Noctuidae.
