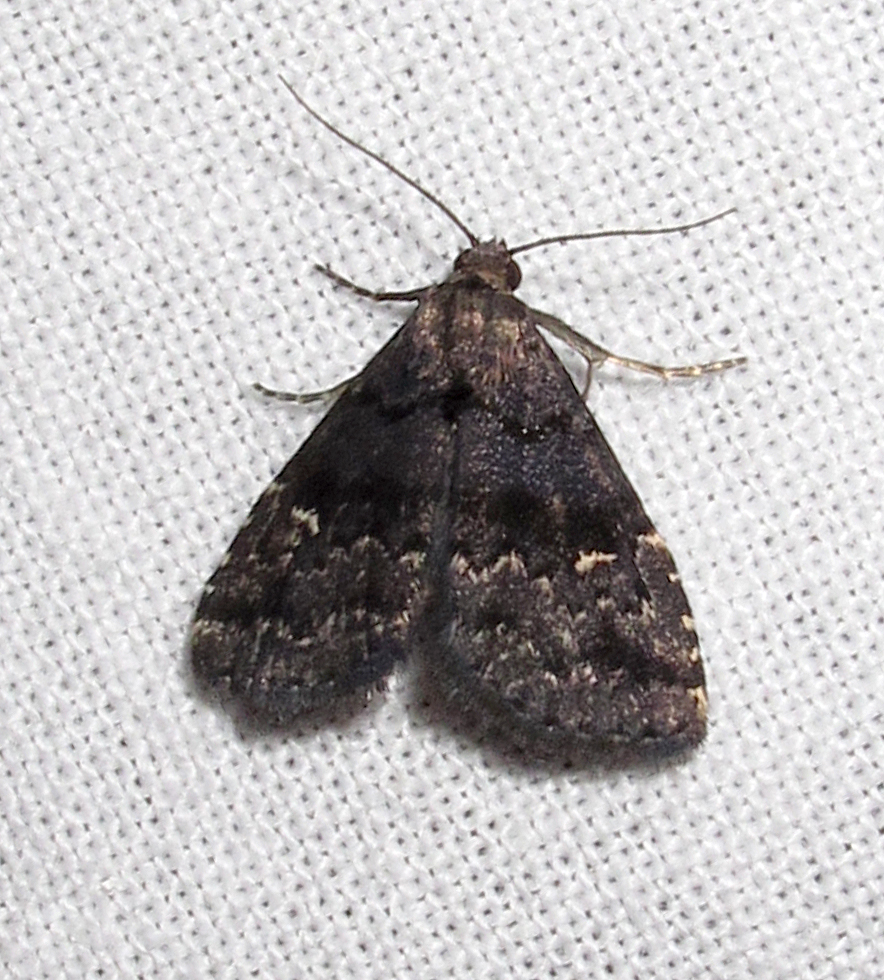
- Dyspyralis nigellus

Scientific classification
- Kingdom: Animalia
- Phylum: Arthropoda
- Class: Insecta
- Order: Lepidoptera
- Superfamily: Noctuoidea
- Family: Erebidae
- Genus: Dyspyralis
- Species: D. nigellus

Binomial name
- Dyspyralis nigellus (Strecker, 1900)

= Dyspyralis nigellus =

Species of moth

Dyspyralis nigellus, the slaty dyspyralis moth, is a species of moth in the family Erebidae. It is found in North America.

The MONA or Hodges number for Dyspyralis nigellus is 8428.
