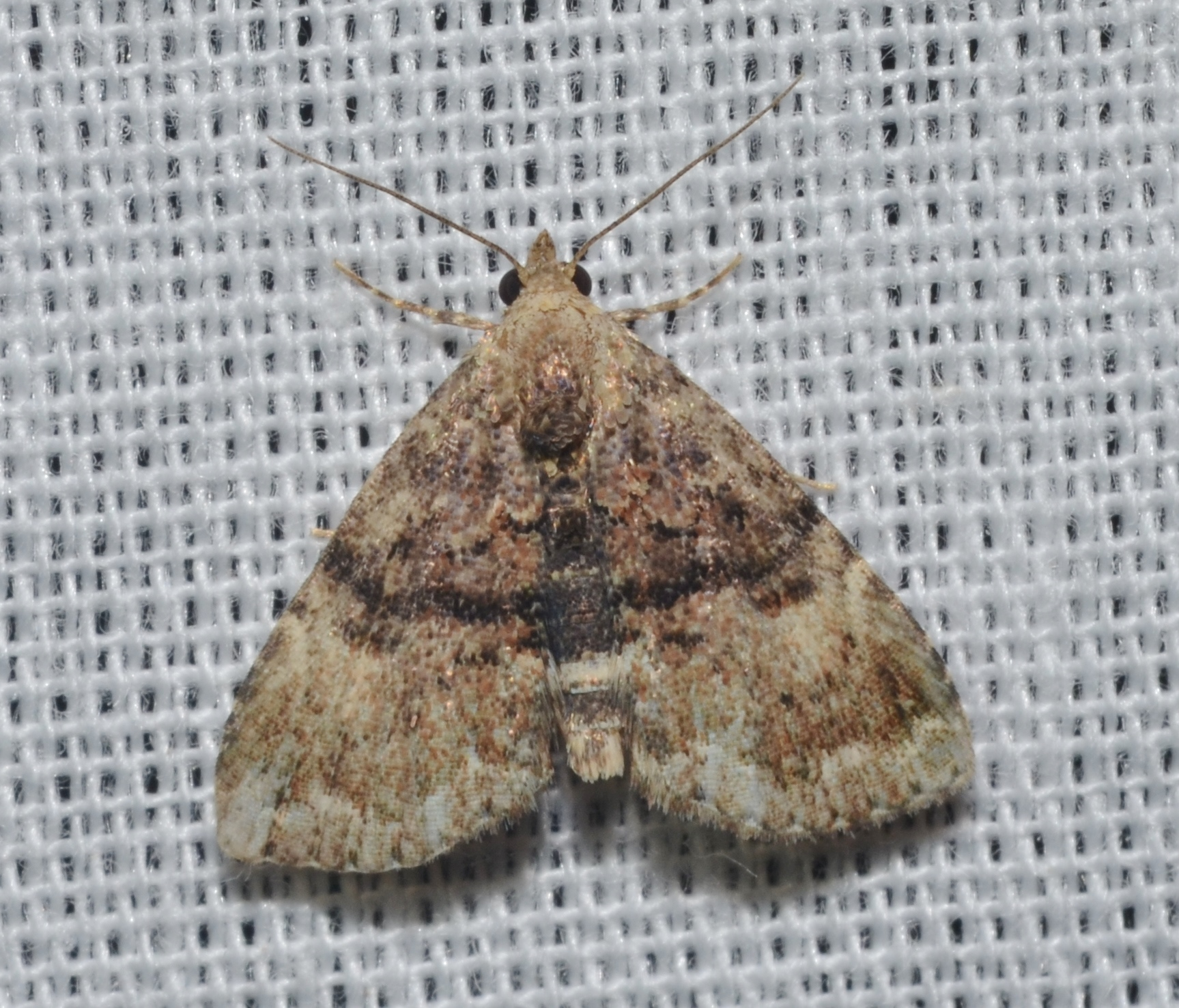

Scientific classification
- Domain: Eukaryota
- Kingdom: Animalia
- Phylum: Arthropoda
- Class: Insecta
- Order: Lepidoptera
- Superfamily: Noctuoidea
- Family: Erebidae
- Genus: Dyspyralis
- Species: D. illocata

Binomial name
- Dyspyralis illocata Warren, 1891

= Dyspyralis illocata =

Species of moth

Dyspyralis illocata, the visitation moth, is moth in the family Erebidae. The family was first described by Warren in 1891. It is found in North America.

The MONA or Hodges number for Dyspyralis illocata is 8426.
