= Schrankia dochmographa =

Scientific classification
- Kingdom: Animalia
- Phylum: Arthropoda
- Clade: Pancrustacea
- Class: Insecta
- Order: Lepidoptera
- Superfamily: Noctuoidea
- Family: Erebidae
- Genus: Schrankia
- Species: S. dochmographa

Binomial name
- Schrankia dochmographa D. S. Fletcher, 1957

Species of moth

Schrankia dochmographa is a species of moth of the family Erebidae. It was described by David Stephen Fletcher in 1957. It is found on the Solomon Islands.
