= Tolpia mons =

Scientific classification
- Domain: Eukaryota
- Kingdom: Animalia
- Phylum: Arthropoda
- Class: Insecta
- Order: Lepidoptera
- Superfamily: Noctuoidea
- Family: Erebidae
- Genus: Tolpia
- Species: T. mons

Binomial name
- Tolpia mons Fibiger, 2010

Species of moth

Tolpia mons is a moth of the family Erebidae first described by Michael Fibiger in 2010. It is known from central Java.

The wingspan is about 13 mm.
