= Melaleucia uparta =

Scientific classification
- Domain: Eukaryota
- Kingdom: Animalia
- Phylum: Arthropoda
- Class: Insecta
- Order: Lepidoptera
- Superfamily: Noctuoidea
- Family: Erebidae
- Genus: Melaleucia
- Species: M. uparta

Binomial name
- Melaleucia uparta Fibiger, 2008

Species of moth

Melaleucia uparta is a moth of the family Erebidae first described by Michael Fibiger in 2008. It is known from south-central Sri Lanka.

There are probably multiple generations per year, with adults recorded in February, March, June, July, August and September.

The wingspan is 13–15 mm.
