= Schrankia microscopica =

Scientific classification
- Domain: Eukaryota
- Kingdom: Animalia
- Phylum: Arthropoda
- Class: Insecta
- Order: Lepidoptera
- Superfamily: Noctuoidea
- Family: Erebidae
- Genus: Schrankia
- Species: S. microscopica

Binomial name
- Schrankia microscopica (Berio, 1962)

Synonyms
- Hypendalia microscopia Berio, 1962

Species of moth

Schrankia microscopica is a species of moth of the family Erebidae first described by Emilio Berio in 1962. It is found on Aldabra in the Seychelles.
