= Tolpia kalimantania =

Scientific classification
- Domain: Eukaryota
- Kingdom: Animalia
- Phylum: Arthropoda
- Class: Insecta
- Order: Lepidoptera
- Superfamily: Noctuoidea
- Family: Erebidae
- Genus: Tolpia
- Species: T. kalimantania

Binomial name
- Tolpia kalimantania Fibiger, 2011

Species of moth

Tolpia kalimantania is a moth of the family Erebidae first described by Michael Fibiger in 2011. It is found on Borneo (it was described from Kalimantan).

The wingspan is about 13 mm.
