= Disca parajavai =

Scientific classification
- Domain: Eukaryota
- Kingdom: Animalia
- Phylum: Arthropoda
- Class: Insecta
- Order: Lepidoptera
- Superfamily: Noctuoidea
- Family: Erebidae
- Genus: Disca
- Species: D. parajavai

Binomial name
- Disca parajavai Fibiger, 2007

Species of moth

Disca parajavai is a moth of the family Erebidae first described by Michael Fibiger in 2007. It is known from northern Sumatra.

The wingspan is about 12 mm. The forewing is relatively broad. The hindwing is light brown and the underside unicolorous light brown.
