= Schrankia kogii =

Scientific classification
- Kingdom: Animalia
- Phylum: Arthropoda
- Class: Insecta
- Order: Lepidoptera
- Superfamily: Noctuoidea
- Family: Erebidae
- Genus: Schrankia
- Species: S. kogii

Binomial name
- Schrankia kogii Inoue, 1979

Species of moth

Schrankia kogii is a species of moth of the family Erebidae first described by Hiroshi Inoue in 1979. It is found in Japan.

The length of the forewings is 6–9 mm.
