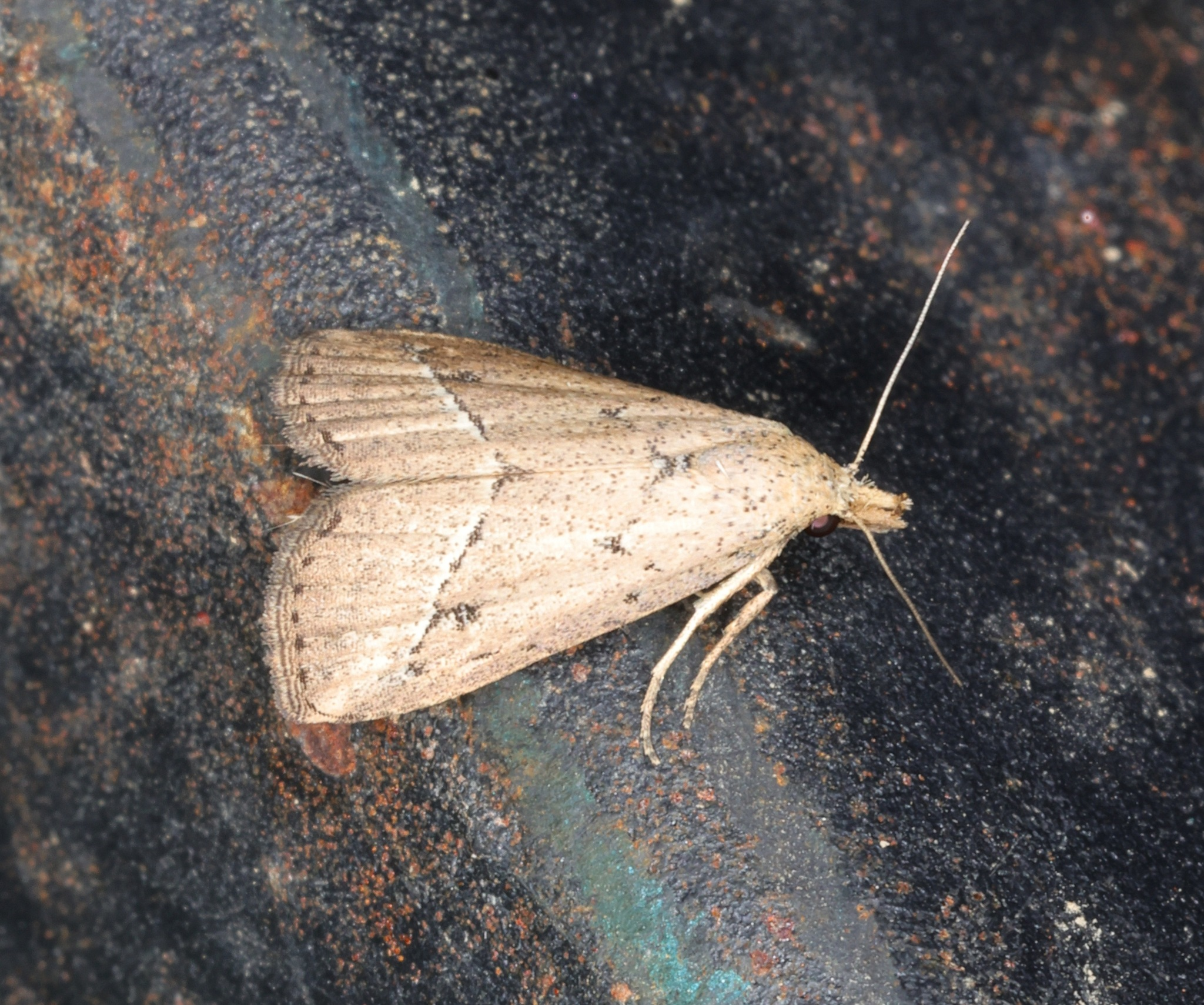
- Luceria striata

Scientific classification
- Kingdom: Animalia
- Phylum: Arthropoda
- Class: Insecta
- Order: Lepidoptera
- Superfamily: Noctuoidea
- Family: Erebidae
- Subfamily: Hypenodinae
- Genus: Luceria; Walker, 1859

= Luceria (moth) =

Genus of moths

Luceria is a genus of moths of the family Erebidae. It was described by Francis Walker in 1859. This genus is found in southern Asia, Australia, on several Pacific islands and a few species also in Africa.

== Taxonomy ==
The genus has previously been classified in subfamily Strepsimaninae of the family Noctuidae.

== Species ==
- Luceria albipupillata Holloway, 2008
- Luceria bakeri Holloway, 2008
- Luceria cooki Holloway, 1977
- Luceria emarginata D. S. Fletcher, 1961
- Luceria eurhipoides (Hampson, 1891)
- Luceria fletcheri Inoue, 1958
- Luceria icasta D. S. Fletcher, 1957
- Luceria jowettorum Holloway, 1982
- Luceria nigerrinalis (Fryer, 1912)
- Luceria novatusalis Walker, 1859
- Luceria oculalis (Moore, 1877)
- Luceria opiusalis Walker, 1859
- Luceria pallida (Hampson, 1891)
- Luceria pamphaea D. S. Fletcher, 1961
- Luceria striata Galsworthy, 1997
