= Disca =

Scientific classification
- Domain: Eukaryota
- Kingdom: Animalia
- Phylum: Arthropoda
- Class: Insecta
- Order: Lepidoptera
- Superfamily: Noctuoidea
- Family: Erebidae
- Subtribe: Pollexina
- Genus: Disca; Fibiger, 2007

Genus of moths

Disca is a genus of moths of the family Erebidae. The genus was erected by Michael Fibiger in 2007.

== Species ==
- Disca javai Fibiger, 2007
- Disca arborita Fibiger, 2007
- Disca hackeri Fibiger, 2007
- Disca parajavai Fibiger, 2007
- Disca tegali Fibiger, 2007
- Disca paulum Fibiger, 2007
- Disca thailandi Fibiger, 2007
- Disca anser Fibiger, 2010
