= Mediala =

Scientific classification
- Domain: Eukaryota
- Kingdom: Animalia
- Phylum: Arthropoda
- Class: Insecta
- Order: Lepidoptera
- Superfamily: Noctuoidea
- Family: Erebidae
- Subtribe: Belluliina
- Genus: Mediala; Fibiger, 2008

Genus of moths

Mediala is a genus of moths of the family Erebidae. The genus was erected by Michael Fibiger in 2008.

== Species ==
- Mediala bipars (Hampson, 1907)
- Mediala spectaculoides Fibiger, 2008
