= Schrankia calligrapha =

Scientific classification
- Kingdom: Animalia
- Phylum: Arthropoda
- Class: Insecta
- Order: Lepidoptera
- Superfamily: Noctuoidea
- Family: Erebidae
- Genus: Schrankia
- Species: S. calligrapha

Binomial name
- Schrankia calligrapha Snellen, 1880

Species of moth

Schrankia calligrapha is a species of moth of the family Erebidae first described by Snellen in 1880. It is found on Sulawesi and the New Hebrides.
