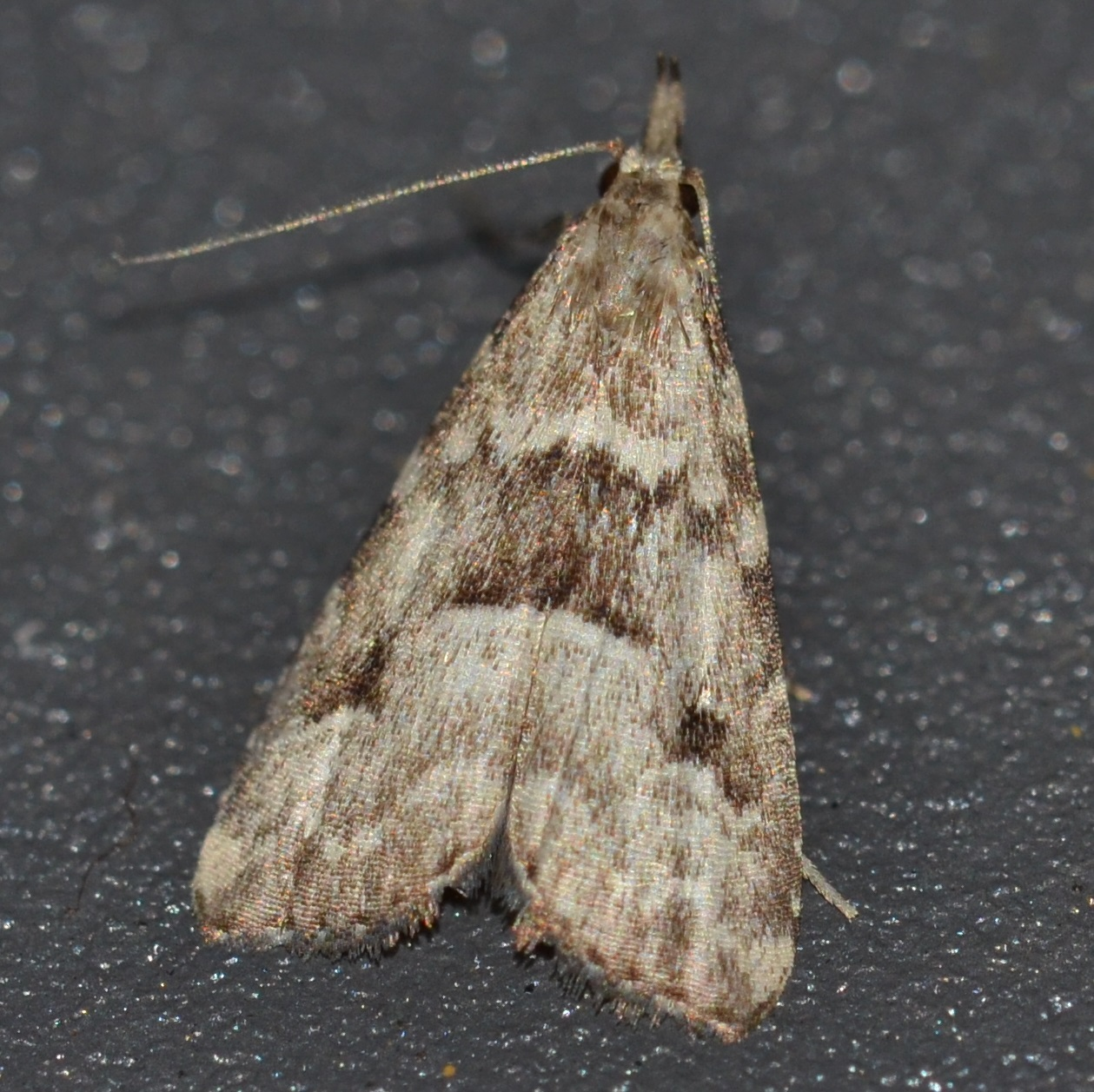

Scientific classification
- Kingdom: Animalia
- Phylum: Arthropoda
- Class: Insecta
- Order: Lepidoptera
- Superfamily: Noctuoidea
- Family: Erebidae
- Genus: Schrankia
- Species: S. howarthi

Binomial name
- Schrankia howarthi Davis & Medeiros, 2009

= Schrankia howarthi =

Species of moth

Schrankia howarthi is a species of moth of the family Erebidae.

The length of the forewings is 4–8 mm.
