= Schrankia tabwemasana =

Scientific classification
- Kingdom: Animalia
- Phylum: Arthropoda
- Clade: Pancrustacea
- Class: Insecta
- Order: Lepidoptera
- Superfamily: Noctuoidea
- Family: Erebidae
- Genus: Schrankia
- Species: S. tabwemasana

Binomial name
- Schrankia tabwemasana Holloway, 1977

Species of moth

Schrankia tabwemasana is a species of moth of the family Erebidae first described by Jeremy Daniel Holloway in 1977. It is found on Vanuatu in the South Pacific Ocean.
