= Tolpia mccabei =

Scientific classification
- Domain: Eukaryota
- Kingdom: Animalia
- Phylum: Arthropoda
- Class: Insecta
- Order: Lepidoptera
- Superfamily: Noctuoidea
- Family: Erebidae
- Genus: Tolpia
- Species: T. mccabei

Binomial name
- Tolpia mccabei Fibiger, 2007

Species of moth

Tolpia mccabei is a moth of the family Erebidae first described by Michael Fibiger in 2007. It is known from Borneo.

The wingspan is about 13 mm. The forewing is rounded, very broad and dark brown. The hindwing is grey brown and the underside unicolorous dark brown.
