= Schrankia capnophanes =

Scientific classification
- Domain: Eukaryota
- Kingdom: Animalia
- Phylum: Arthropoda
- Class: Insecta
- Order: Lepidoptera
- Superfamily: Noctuoidea
- Family: Erebidae
- Genus: Schrankia
- Species: S. capnophanes

Binomial name
- Schrankia capnophanes (Turner, 1939)

Synonyms
- Hypenodes capnophanes Turner, 1939

Species of moth

Schrankia capnophanes is a species of moth of the family Erebidae first described by Alfred Jefferis Turner in 1939. It is found on Tasmania in Australia.
