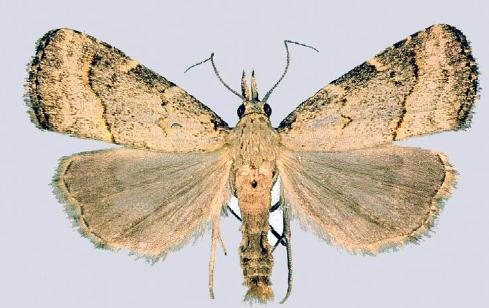

Scientific classification
- Domain: Eukaryota
- Kingdom: Animalia
- Phylum: Arthropoda
- Class: Insecta
- Order: Lepidoptera
- Superfamily: Noctuoidea
- Family: Erebidae
- Genus: Schrankia
- Species: S. separatalis

Binomial name
- Schrankia separatalis (Herz, 1904)

Synonyms
- Hypenodes separatalis Herz, 1904; Hypenodes squalida Wileman & South, 1917; Schrankia squalida

= Schrankia separatalis =

Species of moth

Schrankia separatalis is a species of moth of the family Erebidae first described by Alfred Otto Herz in 1904. It is found in Korea and Japan.

The wingspan is 6.5–8 mm.
