= Melaleucia =

Scientific classification
- Kingdom: Animalia
- Phylum: Arthropoda
- Class: Insecta
- Order: Lepidoptera
- Superfamily: Noctuoidea
- Family: Erebidae
- Subtribe: Belluliina
- Genus: Melaleucia; Hampson, 1900

Genus of moths

Melaleucia is a genus of moths of the family Erebidae first described by George Hampson in 1900.

== Species ==
- Subgenus Melaleucia Hampson, 1900
  - Melaleucia uparta Fibiger, 2008
  - Melaleucia tertia Fibiger, 2008
  - Melaleucia obliquifasciata (Hampson, 1896)
- Subgenus Contrasta Fibiger, 2008
  - Melaleucia leucomera (Hampson, 1926)
