= Schrankia aurantilineata =

Scientific classification
- Kingdom: Animalia
- Phylum: Arthropoda
- Class: Insecta
- Order: Lepidoptera
- Superfamily: Noctuoidea
- Family: Erebidae
- Genus: Schrankia
- Species: S. aurantilineata

Binomial name
- Schrankia aurantilineata (Hampson, 1896)

Synonyms
- Chusaris aurantilineata Hampson, 1896; Luceria aurantilineata

Species of moth

Schrankia aurantilineata is a species of moth of the family Erebidae first described by George Hampson in 1896. It is found in Sri Lanka.
