= Mediala bipars =

Scientific classification
- Kingdom: Animalia
- Phylum: Arthropoda
- Class: Insecta
- Order: Lepidoptera
- Superfamily: Noctuoidea
- Family: Erebidae
- Genus: Mediala
- Species: M. bipars

Binomial name
- Mediala bipars (Hampson, 1907)

Synonyms
- Tolpia bipars Hampson, 1907

Species of moth

Mediala bipars is a moth of the family Erebidae first described by George Hampson in 1907. It is known from Sri Lanka.

The wingspan is 12–13 mm.
