= Tolpia knudlarseni =

Scientific classification
- Domain: Eukaryota
- Kingdom: Animalia
- Phylum: Arthropoda
- Class: Insecta
- Order: Lepidoptera
- Superfamily: Noctuoidea
- Family: Erebidae
- Genus: Tolpia
- Species: T. knudlarseni

Binomial name
- Tolpia knudlarseni Fibiger, 2007

Species of moth

Tolpia knudlarseni is a moth of the family Erebidae first described by Michael Fibiger in 2007. It is known from northern Sumatra.

The wingspan is 14–16 mm. The hindwing is brown and the underside unicolorous brown.
