= Tolpia sarawakia =

Scientific classification
- Domain: Eukaryota
- Kingdom: Animalia
- Phylum: Arthropoda
- Class: Insecta
- Order: Lepidoptera
- Superfamily: Noctuoidea
- Family: Erebidae
- Genus: Tolpia
- Species: T. sarawakia

Binomial name
- Tolpia sarawakia Fibiger, 2007

Species of moth

Tolpia sarawakia is a moth of the family Erebidae first described by Michael Fibiger in 2007. It is known from Malaysia.

The wingspan is about 13 mm. The hindwing is brown and the underside unicolorous brown.
