= Schrankia dusunorum =

Scientific classification
- Kingdom: Animalia
- Phylum: Arthropoda
- Clade: Pancrustacea
- Class: Insecta
- Order: Lepidoptera
- Superfamily: Noctuoidea
- Family: Erebidae
- Genus: Schrankia
- Species: S. dusunorum

Binomial name
- Schrankia dusunorum Holloway, 2008

Species of moth

Schrankia dusunorum is a species of moth of the family Erebidae first described by Jeremy Daniel Holloway in 2008. It is found in Sabah on Borneo.
