= Disca javai =

Scientific classification
- Domain: Eukaryota
- Kingdom: Animalia
- Phylum: Arthropoda
- Class: Insecta
- Order: Lepidoptera
- Superfamily: Noctuoidea
- Family: Erebidae
- Genus: Disca
- Species: D. javai

Binomial name
- Disca javai Fibiger, 2007

Species of moth

Disca javai is a moth of the family Erebidae first described by Michael Fibiger in 2007. It is found on the island of Java.

The moth's wingspan is 12–13 mm. The forewing is relatively broad and greyish brown. The hindwing is greyish brown and the underside unicolorous greyish brown.
