= Schrankia bilineata =

Scientific classification
- Kingdom: Animalia
- Phylum: Arthropoda
- Clade: Pancrustacea
- Class: Insecta
- Order: Lepidoptera
- Superfamily: Noctuoidea
- Family: Erebidae
- Genus: Schrankia
- Species: S. bilineata

Binomial name
- Schrankia bilineata Galsworthy, 1997

Species of moth

Schrankia bilineata is a species of moth of the family Erebidae. It is known from only seven localities throughout Hong Kong (including the NW New Territories, the Sai Kung Peninsula, Central New Territories, and Hong Kong Island), with no apparent habitat association. There are ten records to date, with the Mai Po Nature Reserve holding the largest population, based upon the number of individuals seen.

The larvae are thought to live as detritivores in damp grasslands or reedbeds.
