= Tolpia talauti =

Scientific classification
- Domain: Eukaryota
- Kingdom: Animalia
- Phylum: Arthropoda
- Class: Insecta
- Order: Lepidoptera
- Superfamily: Noctuoidea
- Family: Erebidae
- Genus: Tolpia
- Species: T. talauti

Binomial name
- Tolpia talauti Fibiger, 2007

Species of moth

Tolpia talauti is a moth of the family Erebidae first described by Michael Fibiger in 2007. It is known from the Talaud Islands of Indonesia.

The wingspan is about 14 mm. The hindwing is brown and the underside unicolorous brown.
