= Tolpia alexmadseni =

Scientific classification
- Domain: Eukaryota
- Kingdom: Animalia
- Phylum: Arthropoda
- Class: Insecta
- Order: Lepidoptera
- Superfamily: Noctuoidea
- Family: Erebidae
- Genus: Tolpia
- Species: T. alexmadseni

Binomial name
- Tolpia alexmadseni Fibiger, 2007

Species of moth

Tolpia alexmadseni is a moth of the family Erebidae first described by Michael Fibiger in 2007. It is known from northern Sumatra.

The wingspan is 13–15 mm. The hindwing is dark brown and the underside unicolorous brown.
