= Tolpia buthani =

Scientific classification
- Domain: Eukaryota
- Kingdom: Animalia
- Phylum: Arthropoda
- Class: Insecta
- Order: Lepidoptera
- Superfamily: Noctuoidea
- Family: Erebidae
- Genus: Tolpia
- Species: T. buthani

Binomial name
- Tolpia buthani Fibiger, 2007

Species of moth

Tolpia buthani is a moth of the family Erebidae first described by Michael Fibiger in 2007. It is known from Bhutan.

The wingspan is about 13 mm. The hindwing is blackish brown and the underside unicolorous brown.
