= Schrankia balneorum =

Scientific classification
- Domain: Eukaryota
- Kingdom: Animalia
- Phylum: Arthropoda
- Class: Insecta
- Order: Lepidoptera
- Superfamily: Noctuoidea
- Family: Erebidae
- Genus: Schrankia
- Species: S. balneorum

Binomial name
- Schrankia balneorum (Alphéraky, 1880)

Synonyms
- Hypenodes balneorum Alphéraky, 1880; Schrankia bosporella Budashkin & Klyuchko, 1990

Species of moth

Schrankia balneorum is a species of moth of the family Erebidae first described by Sergei Alphéraky in 1880. It is found in the Caucasus, Crimea, the southern Urals, Turkey, Georgia, Armenia, Azerbaijan and the Kopet Dagh.
