= Tolpia parasarawakia =

Scientific classification
- Domain: Eukaryota
- Kingdom: Animalia
- Phylum: Arthropoda
- Class: Insecta
- Order: Lepidoptera
- Superfamily: Noctuoidea
- Family: Erebidae
- Genus: Tolpia
- Species: T. parasarawakia

Binomial name
- Tolpia parasarawakia Fibiger, 2007

Species of moth

Tolpia parasarawakia is a moth of the family Erebidae first described by Michael Fibiger in 2007. It is known from Sumatra.

The wingspan is 13–14 mm. The hindwing is brown and the underside unicolorous brown.
