= Tolpia crispus =

Scientific classification
- Kingdom: Animalia
- Phylum: Arthropoda
- Clade: Pancrustacea
- Class: Insecta
- Order: Lepidoptera
- Superfamily: Noctuoidea
- Family: Erebidae
- Genus: Tolpia
- Species: T. crispus

Binomial name
- Tolpia crispus Fibiger, 2007

Species of moth

Tolpia crispus is a moth of the family Erebidae first described by Michael Fibiger in 2007. It is known from Borneo.

The wingspan is about 17 mm. The hindwing is brown and the underside unicolorous brown.
