= Disca anser =

Scientific classification
- Domain: Eukaryota
- Kingdom: Animalia
- Phylum: Arthropoda
- Class: Insecta
- Order: Lepidoptera
- Superfamily: Noctuoidea
- Family: Erebidae
- Genus: Disca
- Species: D. anser

Binomial name
- Disca anser Fibiger, 2010

Species of moth

Disca anser is a moth of the family Erebidae first described by Michael Fibiger in 2010. It is known from Malaysia.

The wingspan is 12–13 mm.
