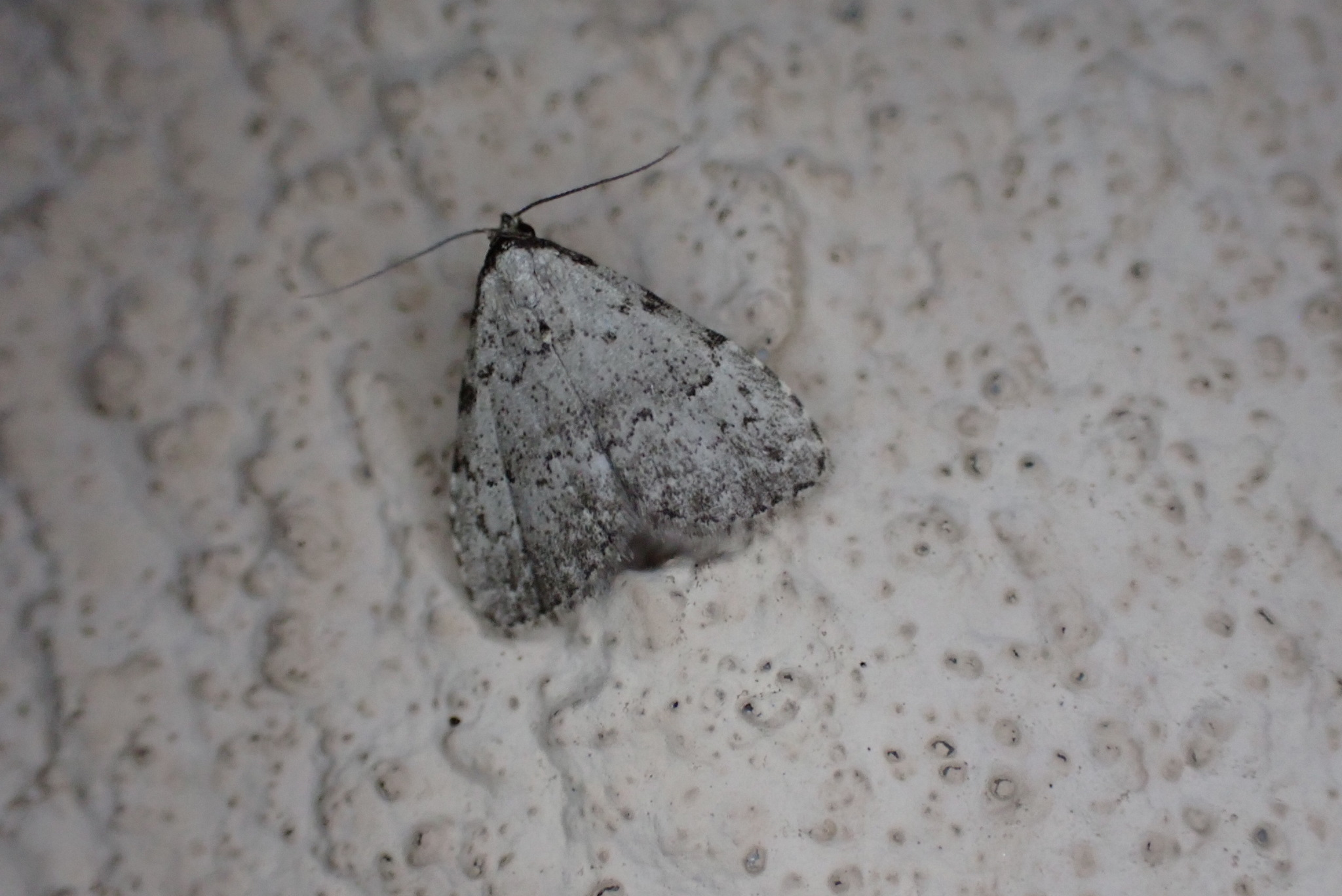

Scientific classification
- Kingdom: Animalia
- Phylum: Arthropoda
- Class: Insecta
- Order: Lepidoptera
- Superfamily: Noctuoidea
- Family: Erebidae
- Genus: Dyspyralis
- Species: D. puncticosta

Binomial name
- Dyspyralis puncticosta (Smith, 1908)

= Dyspyralis puncticosta =

Species of moth

Dyspyralis puncticosta, the spot-edged dyspyralis moth, is a species of moth in the family Erebidae, and subfamily Scolecocampinae It is found in North America.

The MONA or Hodges number for Dyspyralis puncticosta is 8427.
