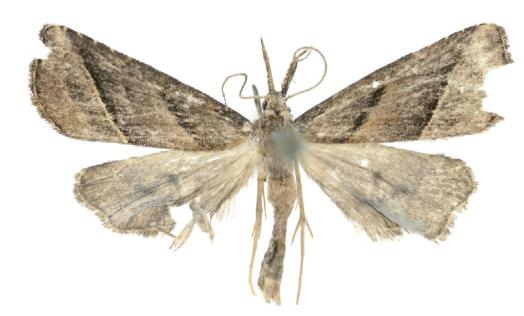

Scientific classification
- Domain: Eukaryota
- Kingdom: Animalia
- Phylum: Arthropoda
- Class: Insecta
- Order: Lepidoptera
- Superfamily: Noctuoidea
- Family: Erebidae
- Genus: Schrankia
- Species: S. pelicano

Binomial name
- Schrankia pelicano Pekarsky, 2012

= Schrankia pelicano =

Species of moth

Schrankia pelicano is a species of moth of the family Erebidae first described by Oleg Pekarsky in 2012. It is found in Sichuan in south-western China.

The wingspan is 16–17 mm. The ground color of the forewings is grey brown and the hindwings are ochreous grey.

== Etymology ==
The species name refers to the resemblance of the opened male genitalia to a pelican.
