= Melaleucia leucomera =

Scientific classification
- Kingdom: Animalia
- Phylum: Arthropoda
- Class: Insecta
- Order: Lepidoptera
- Superfamily: Noctuoidea
- Family: Erebidae
- Genus: Melaleucia
- Species: M. leucomera

Binomial name
- Melaleucia leucomera (Hampson, 1926)

Synonyms
- Tolpia leucomera Hampson, 1926

Species of moth

Melaleucia leucomera is a moth of the family Erebidae first described by George Hampson in 1926. It is known from south-central Sri Lanka.

There are probably multiple generations per year, with adults recorded in April, May, June, August and September.

The wingspan is 15–16 mm.
