= Disca thailandi =

Scientific classification
- Kingdom: Animalia
- Phylum: Arthropoda
- Class: Insecta
- Order: Lepidoptera
- Superfamily: Noctuoidea
- Family: Erebidae
- Genus: Disca
- Species: D. thailandi

Binomial name
- Disca thailandi Fibiger, 2007

Species of moth

Disca thailandi is a moth of the family Erebidae and it first described by Michael Fibiger in 2007. It originates from mid-western Thailand.

The wingspan is 11–13 mm. The forewing is relatively broad. The hindwing is greyish brown and the underside is a unicoloured greyish brown.
