= Tolpia unguis =

Scientific classification
- Domain: Eukaryota
- Kingdom: Animalia
- Phylum: Arthropoda
- Class: Insecta
- Order: Lepidoptera
- Superfamily: Noctuoidea
- Family: Erebidae
- Genus: Tolpia
- Species: T. unguis

Binomial name
- Tolpia unguis Fibiger, 2007

Species of moth

Tolpia unguis is a moth of the family Erebidae first described by Michael Fibiger in 2007. It is known from mid-western Thailand.

The wingspan is 13–14 mm. The hindwing is dark brown and the underside unicolorous brown.
