= Schrankia croceipicta =

Scientific classification
- Kingdom: Animalia
- Phylum: Arthropoda
- Clade: Pancrustacea
- Class: Insecta
- Order: Lepidoptera
- Superfamily: Noctuoidea
- Family: Erebidae
- Genus: Schrankia
- Species: S. croceipicta

Binomial name
- Schrankia croceipicta (Hampson, 1893)

Synonyms
- Hypenodes croceipicta Hampson, 1893; Hypenodes croceipicta aegrota Berio, 1962

Species of moth

Schrankia croceipicta is a species of moth of the family Erebidae. It was first described by George Hampson in 1893. It is found in Sri Lanka and the Seychelles.

== Description ==
Its wingspan is about 20 mm (0.79 in). The head is brownish ochreous. Thorax purplish grey and abdomen pale. Forewings with dark purplish with greyish irrorations (sprinkling). There is an oblique orange striga runs from costa near base. A dentate orange antemedial line most prominent at middle, where it has a black streak and spot on its outer edge. A black streak found at end of cell, with an orange striga runs from costa above it. An oblique orange line found from below apex to middle of inner margin, with some diffused grey beyond it. Some white specks can be seen on costa towards apex. Hindwings whitish, with dark lunules at end of cell. The outer area slightly suffused with fuscous.
