= Disca arborita =

Scientific classification
- Kingdom: Animalia
- Phylum: Arthropoda
- Class: Insecta
- Order: Lepidoptera
- Superfamily: Noctuoidea
- Family: Erebidae
- Genus: Disca
- Species: D. arborita

Binomial name
- Disca arborita Fibiger, 2007

Species of moth

Disca arborita is a moth of the family Erebidae first described by Michael Fibiger in 2007. It is known from Sumatra.

The wingspan is 11–12 mm. The forewing is relatively broad. The hindwing is light brown and the underside unicolorous light brown.
