= Schrankia taona =

Scientific classification
- Domain: Eukaryota
- Kingdom: Animalia
- Phylum: Arthropoda
- Class: Insecta
- Order: Lepidoptera
- Superfamily: Noctuoidea
- Family: Erebidae
- Genus: Schrankia
- Species: S. taona

Binomial name
- Schrankia taona (Tams, 1935)

Species of moth

Schrankia taona is a species of moth of the family Erebidae first described by Tams in 1935. It is found on Samoa in the South Pacific Ocean.
