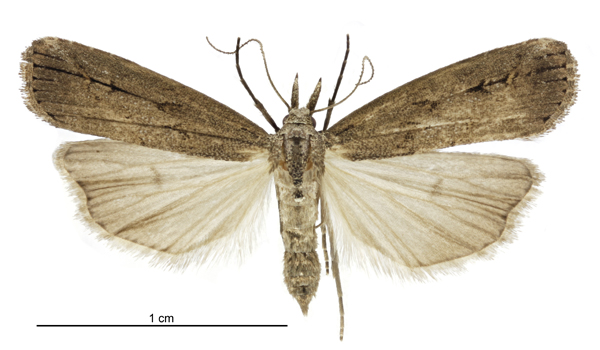
- Female
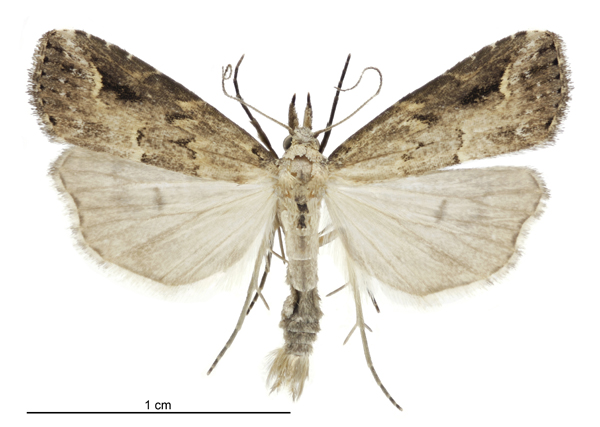
- Male

Scientific classification
- Domain: Eukaryota
- Kingdom: Animalia
- Phylum: Arthropoda
- Class: Insecta
- Order: Lepidoptera
- Superfamily: Noctuoidea
- Family: Erebidae
- Genus: Schrankia
- Species: S. costaestrigalis

Binomial name
- Schrankia costaestrigalis (Stephens, 1834)

Synonyms
- Cledeobia costaestrigalis Stephens, 1834; Hypenodes exsularis Meyrick, 1888; Scoparia triangulalis Hudson, 1923; Hypenodes costistrigalis Dannehl, 1925; Hypenodes lugubralis Dannehl, 1925; Schrankia monotona Lempke, 1949; Schrankia f. unicolor Lempke, 1949; Schrankia virgata Lempke, 1966; Schrankia hartigi Berio, 1991

= Schrankia costaestrigalis =

Pinion-streaked snout

Species of moth

Schrankia costaestrigalis, the pinion-streaked snout, is a species of moth of the family Erebidae. It is found in Europe, the Canaries, Madeira, Syria, Armenia. It is also present in New Zealand. The species closely resembles Crambidae or Pyralidae species.

== Technical description and variation ==
The wingspan is 16–22 mm. The length of the forewings is 9–11 mm. Forewing whitish ochreous, mixed with brownish fuscous towards costa; a fine black dash beneath costa at base; inner line partly blackish, dentate; outer oblique, irregular, partly marked with dark and edged posteriorly with whitish; cellspot small, blackish, connected with outer line by dark fuscous suffusion; subterminal line indistinct, pale; hindwing luteous whitish, with a grey discal dot.

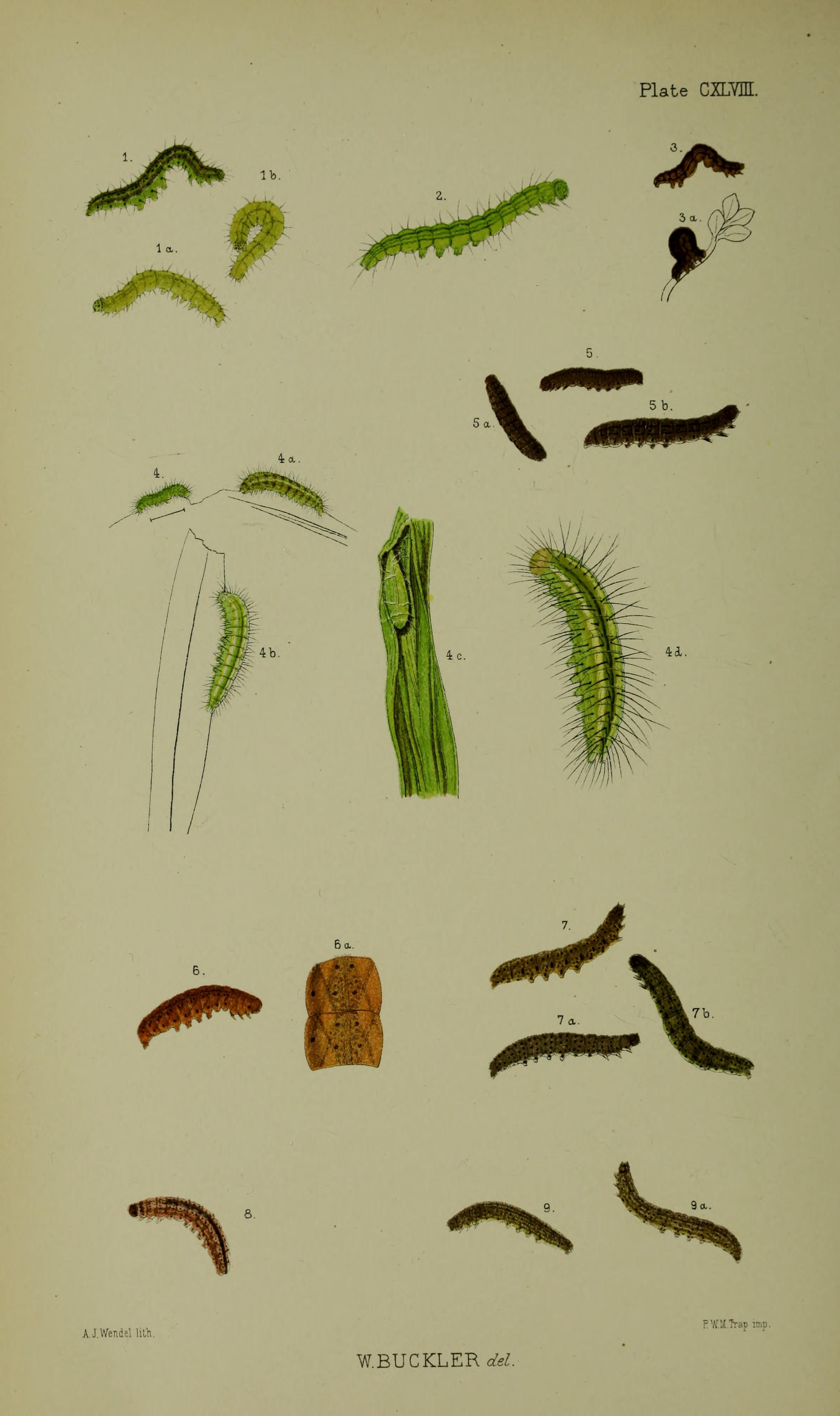
Figs. 3, 3a larvae after final moult, on wild thyme

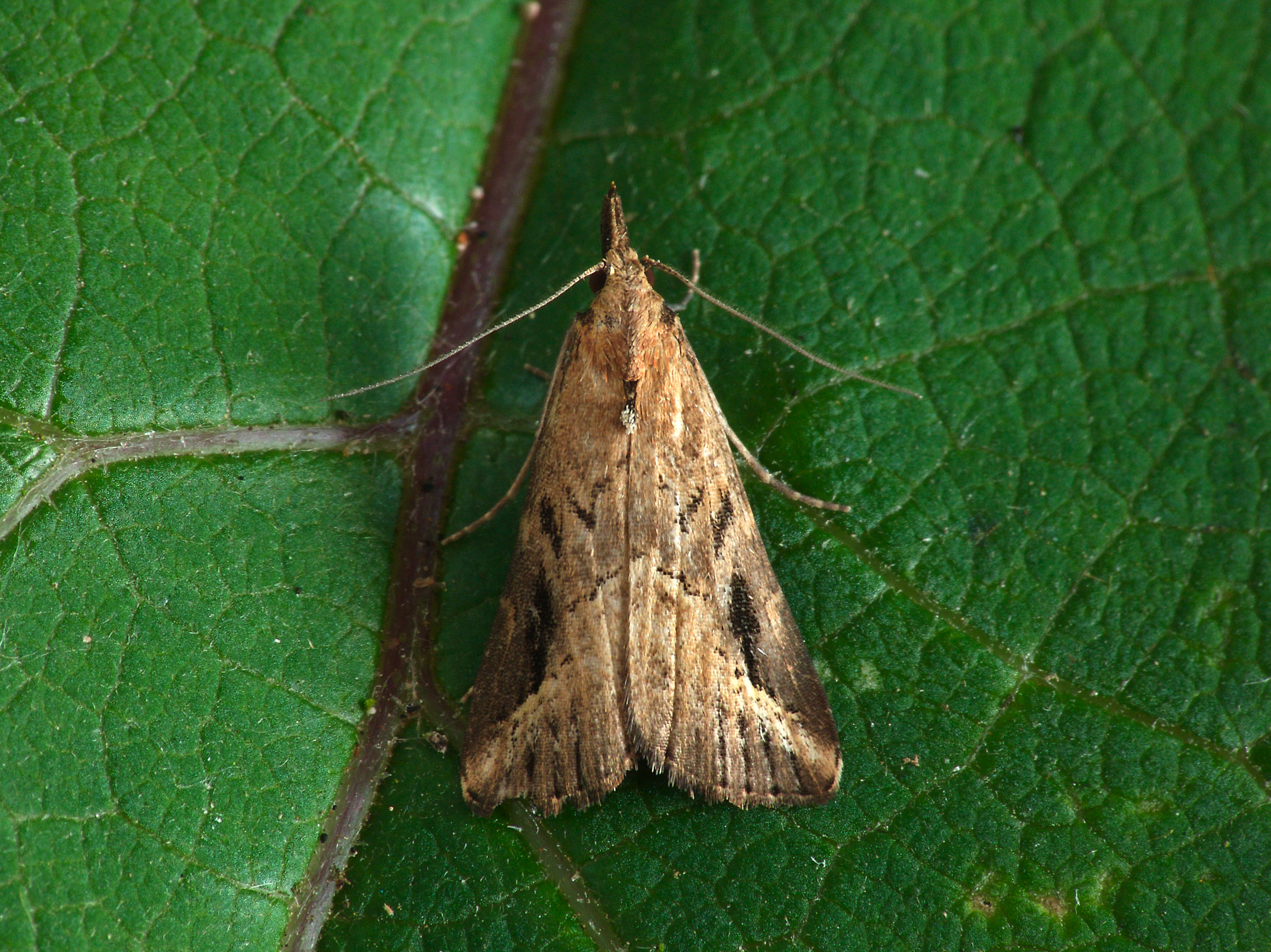

== Biology ==
The moth flies from May to October depending on the location.

Larva dark purplish brown; dorsal and subdorsal lines pale, the latter black-edged beneath; sides more ochreous; will feed on flowers of thyme in captivity. The larvae feed on various herbaceous and woody plants. Reported to feed on potato tubers and to cause significant crop loss (>80%) in China.
