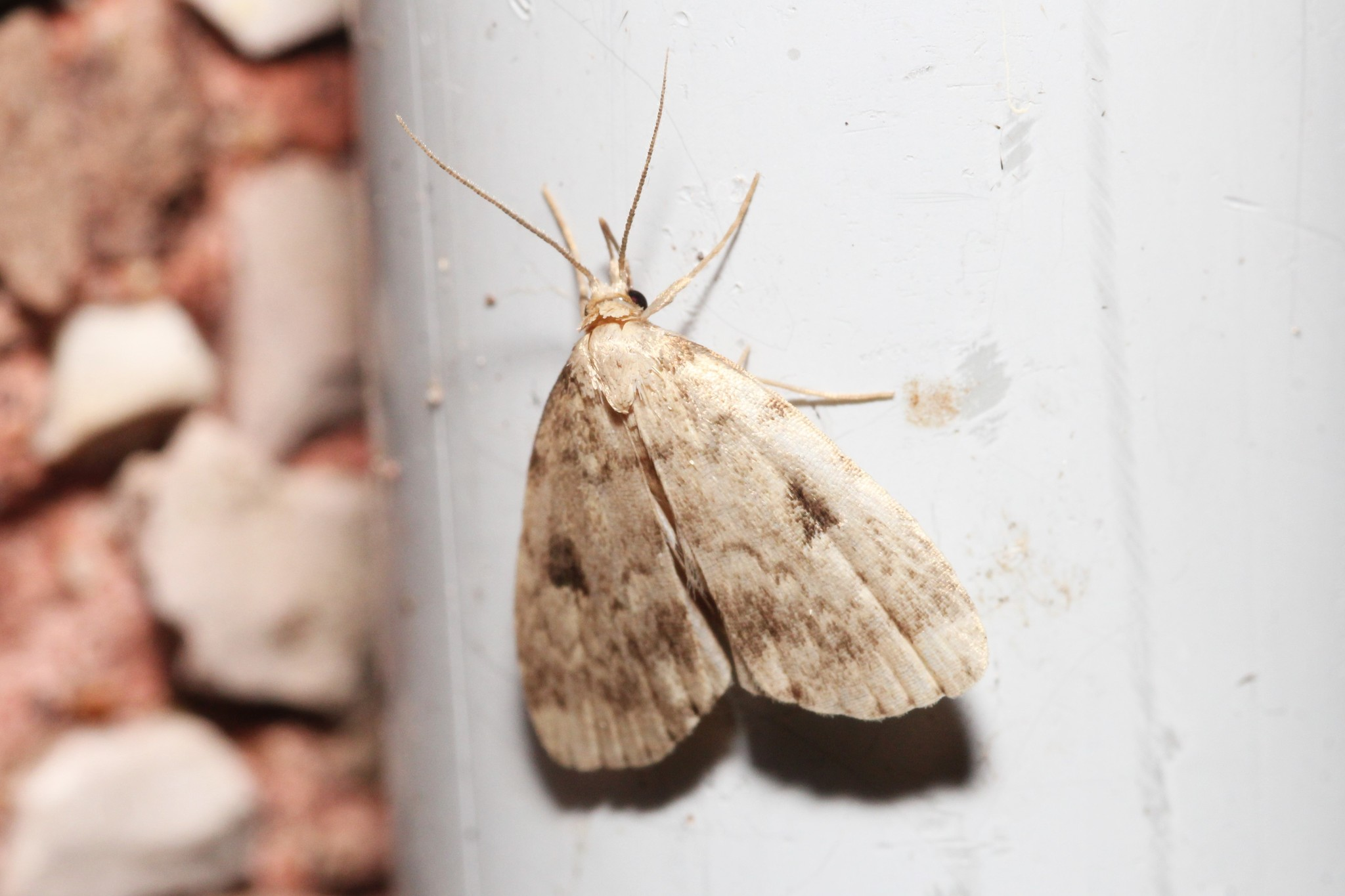

Scientific classification
- Kingdom: Animalia
- Phylum: Arthropoda
- Clade: Pancrustacea
- Class: Insecta
- Order: Lepidoptera
- Superfamily: Noctuoidea
- Family: Erebidae
- Genus: Parahypenodes; Barnes & McDunnough, 1918
- Species: P. quadralis

Binomial name
- Parahypenodes quadralis Barnes & McDunnough, 1918

= Parahypenodes =

Genus of moths

Parahypenodes is a monotypic moth genus of the family Erebidae. Its only species, Parahypenodes quadralis, the masked parahypenodes moth, is found in the Canadian province of Quebec. Both the genus and species were first described by William Barnes and James Halliday McDunnough in 1918.

== Taxonomy ==
The genus has previously been classified in the subfamily Hypeninae of the families Erebidae or Noctuidae.
