= Schrankia namibiensis =

Scientific classification
- Domain: Eukaryota
- Kingdom: Animalia
- Phylum: Arthropoda
- Class: Insecta
- Order: Lepidoptera
- Superfamily: Noctuoidea
- Family: Erebidae
- Genus: Schrankia
- Species: S. namibiensis

Binomial name
- Schrankia namibiensis Hacker, 2004

Synonyms
- Pseudomicrodes namibiensis (Hacker, 2004)

Species of moth

Schrankia namibiensis is a species of moth of the family Erebidae first described by Hermann Heinrich Hacker in 2004. It is found in Namibia.
