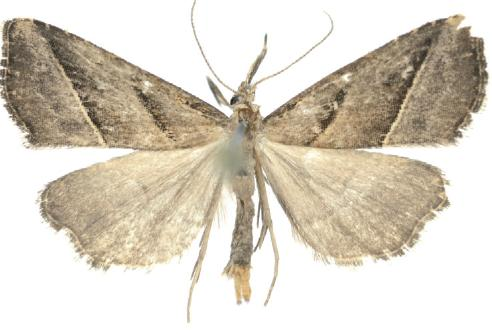

Scientific classification
- Kingdom: Animalia
- Phylum: Arthropoda
- Clade: Pancrustacea
- Class: Insecta
- Order: Lepidoptera
- Superfamily: Noctuoidea
- Family: Erebidae
- Subfamily: Hypenodinae; Forbes, 1954

= Hypenodinae =

Subfamily of moths

The Hypenodinae are a subfamily of moths in the family Erebidae. Adult moths of most species of this subfamily lack small, simple eyes near the large, compound eyes and have quadrifine (four-veined) hindwing cells. The micronoctuid moths are an exception because they possess simple eyes and bifine (two-veined) hindwing cells.

== Taxonomy ==
Phylogenetic studies have shown that this subfamily should include the micronoctuid moths as a Micronoctuini tribe.

== Genera ==
=== Tribe unassigned ===
- Anachrostis Hampson, 1893
- Dasyblemma Dyar, 1923
- Dyspyralis Warren, 1891
- Hypenodes Doubleday, 1850
- Luceria Walker, 1859
- Parahypenodes Barnes & McDunnough, 1918
- Schrankia Hübner, [1825]

=== Tribe Micronoctuini ===
- See Micronoctuini for subtribes and genera.
