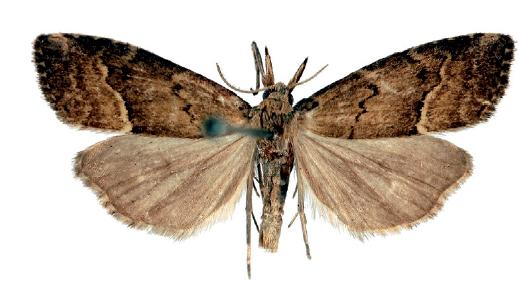

Scientific classification
- Kingdom: Animalia
- Phylum: Arthropoda
- Clade: Pancrustacea
- Class: Insecta
- Order: Lepidoptera
- Superfamily: Noctuoidea
- Family: Erebidae
- Genus: Schrankia
- Species: S. taenialis

Binomial name
- Schrankia taenialis (Hübner, 1809)

Synonyms
- Pyralis taenialis Hübner, 1809; Crambus albistrigalis Haworth, 1809; Cledeobia acuminalis Herrich-Schäffer, 1851

= Schrankia taenialis =

White-line snout

Species of moth

Schrankia taenialis, the white-line snout, is a species of moth of the family Erebidae. It is found from Central Europe to Sardinia, Sicily, North Turkey and Azerbaijan.

== Technical description and variation ==
H. taenialis Hbn. (= albistrigatis Haw., albistrigatus Stph., acuminalis H.-Sch., albistrigalis Guen.) Forewing brownish; a fine black dash beneath costa at base; inner line dentate, blackish; outer black, outwardly whitish-edged, indistinct towards costa, straight and conspicuous in lower half; cellspot dark, obscure, paler posteriorly; subterminal line pale, indistinct; hindwing light grey. The wingspan is 18–24 mm.

== Biology ==
Adults are on wing in summer. There are two generations per year.

The larvae feed on Melampyrum, Calluna and Thymus species
