= Schrankia scoparioides =

Scientific classification
- Kingdom: Animalia
- Phylum: Arthropoda
- Clade: Pancrustacea
- Class: Insecta
- Order: Lepidoptera
- Superfamily: Noctuoidea
- Family: Erebidae
- Genus: Schrankia
- Species: S. scoparioides

Binomial name
- Schrankia scoparioides Hacker, 2004

Synonyms
- Pseudomicrodes scoparioides (Hacker, 2004)

Species of moth

Schrankia scoparioides is a species of moth of the family Erebidae first described by Hermann Heinrich Hacker in 2004. It is found in Namibia.
