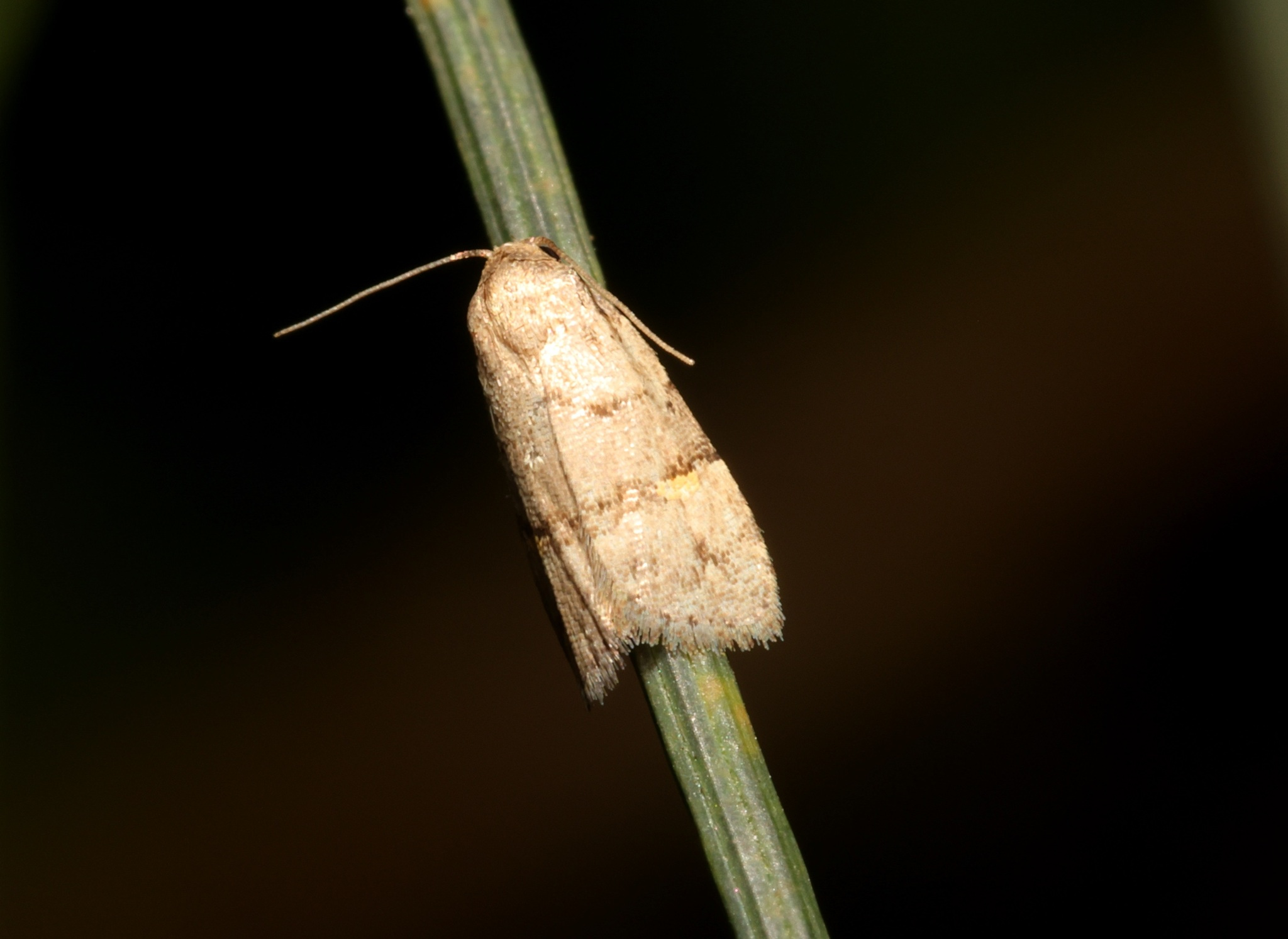
- Fustius sterlingi

Scientific classification
- Kingdom: Animalia
- Phylum: Arthropoda
- Class: Insecta
- Order: Lepidoptera
- Superfamily: Noctuoidea
- Family: Erebidae
- Subfamily: Hypenodinae
- Tribe: Micronoctuini; Fibiger in Fibiger & Lafontaine, 2005

Diversity
- About 400 species

Synonyms
- Micronoctuidae Fibiger in Fibiger & Lafontaine, 2005

= Micronoctuini =

Tribe of moths

The Micronoctuini are a tribe of moths in the family Erebidae that includes about 400 described species. Typical species in the tribe have bifine hindwing venation (unlike most of the related subfamily Hypenodinae) and are smaller than those in other noctuoid moths. Micronoctua karsholti is the smallest of all species in the superfamily Noctuoidea.

An extensive, four-part revision of the Micronoctuidae was published by Michael Fibiger from 2007 to 2011 (see References section), describing dozens of species for their first time and classifying them into subfamilies and tribes. A subsequent series of studies of the higher-level classification of the superfamily Noctuoidea showed that the phylogenetic placement of Micronoctuidae is as a clade within the subfamily Hypenodinae of the family Erebidae. This reclassification moved Micronoctuidae to the tribe Micronoctuini, its subfamilies to subtribes, and presumably its original tribes to infratribes.

== Subtribes (former subfamilies) ==
- Belluliina Fibiger, 2008
- Magnina Fibiger, 2008
- Micronoctuina Fibiger, 2005
- Parachrostiina Fibiger, 2008
- Pollexina Fibiger, 2007
- Tactusina Fibiger, 2010
- Tentaxina Fibiger, 2011
