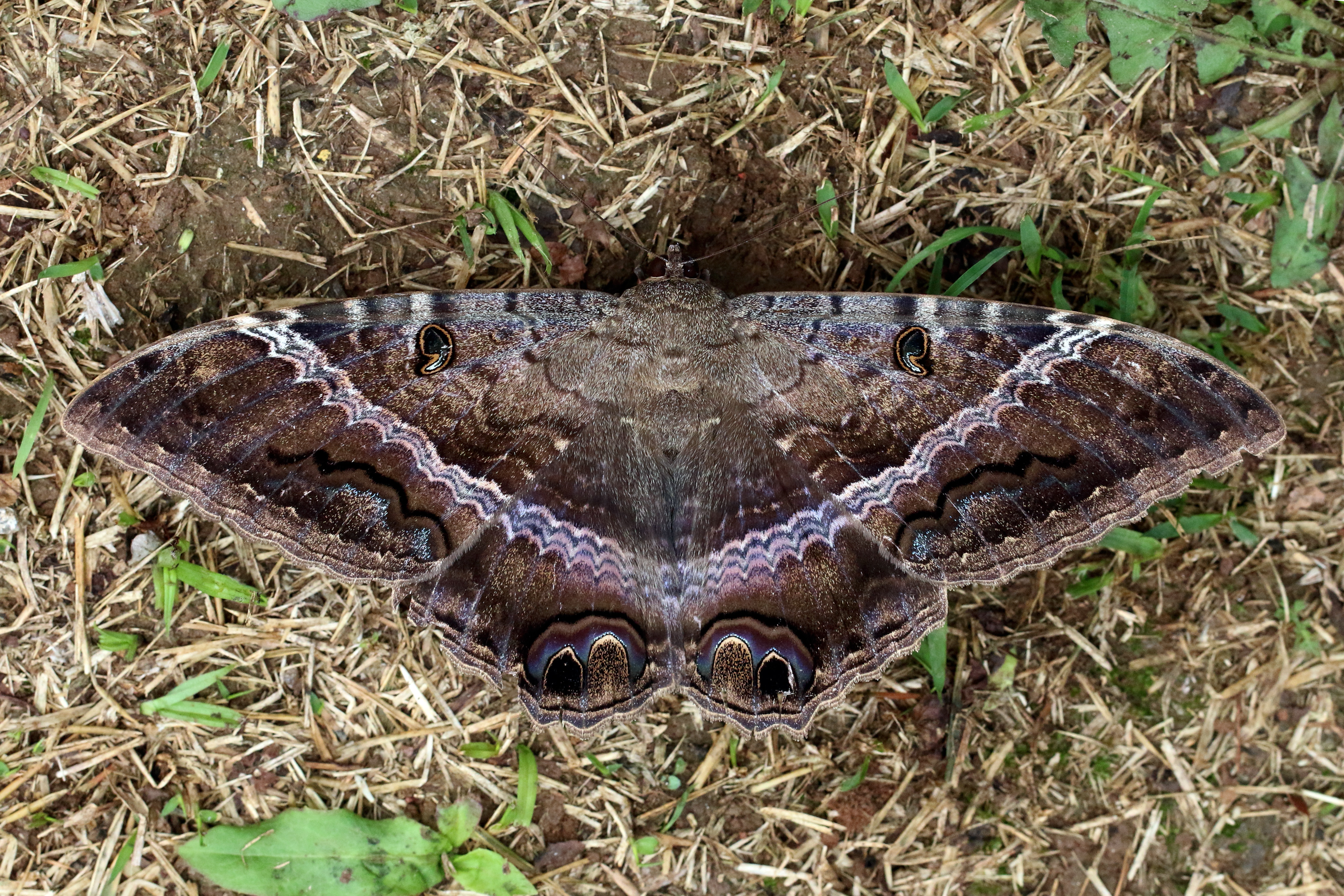
- Black witch moth Ascalapha odorata, Brazil

Scientific classification
- Kingdom: Animalia
- Phylum: Arthropoda
- Clade: Pancrustacea
- Class: Insecta
- Order: Lepidoptera
- Superfamily: Noctuoidea
- Family: Erebidae (Leach, 1815)

= Erebidae =

Family of moths

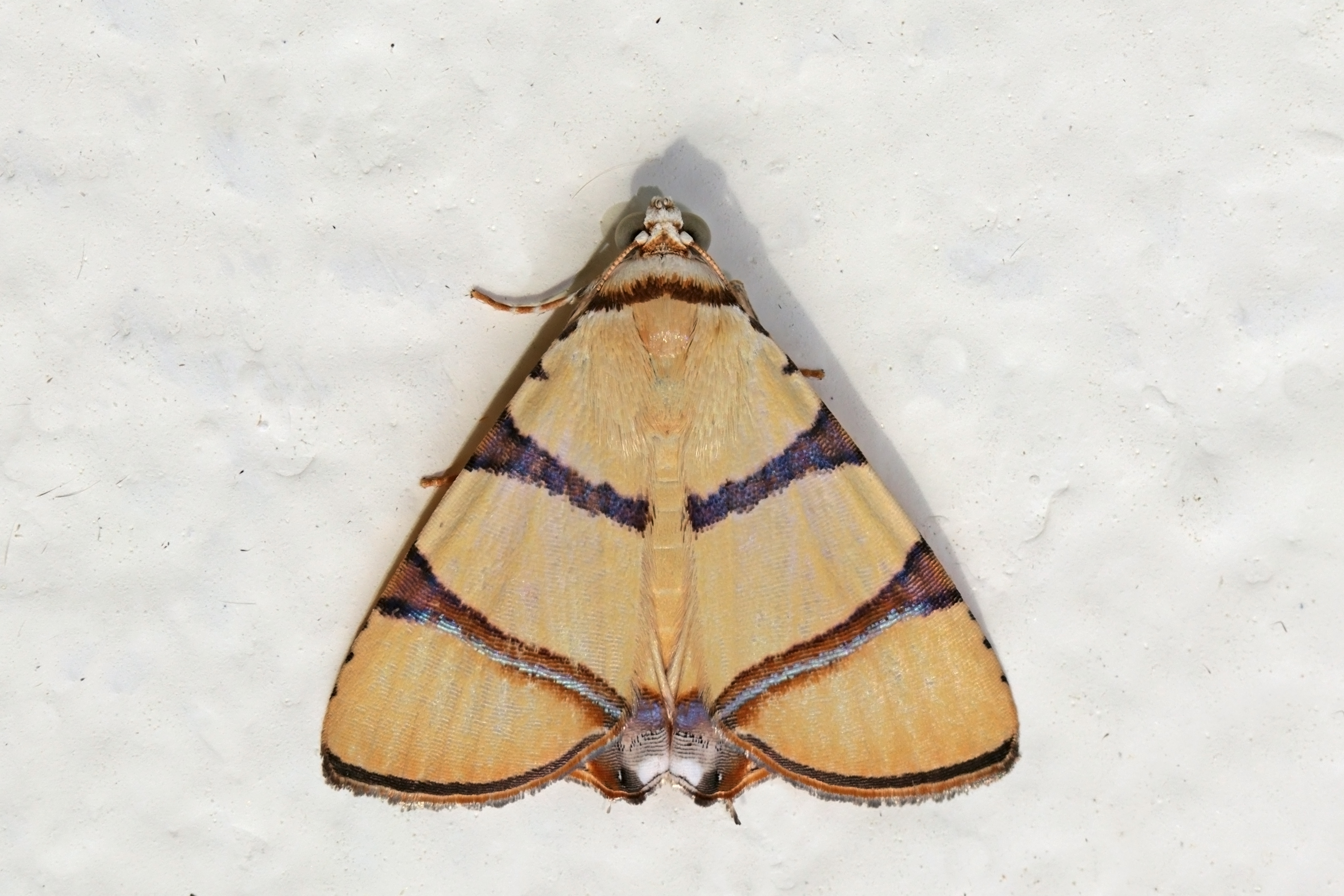
Eulepidotis affinis, Panama

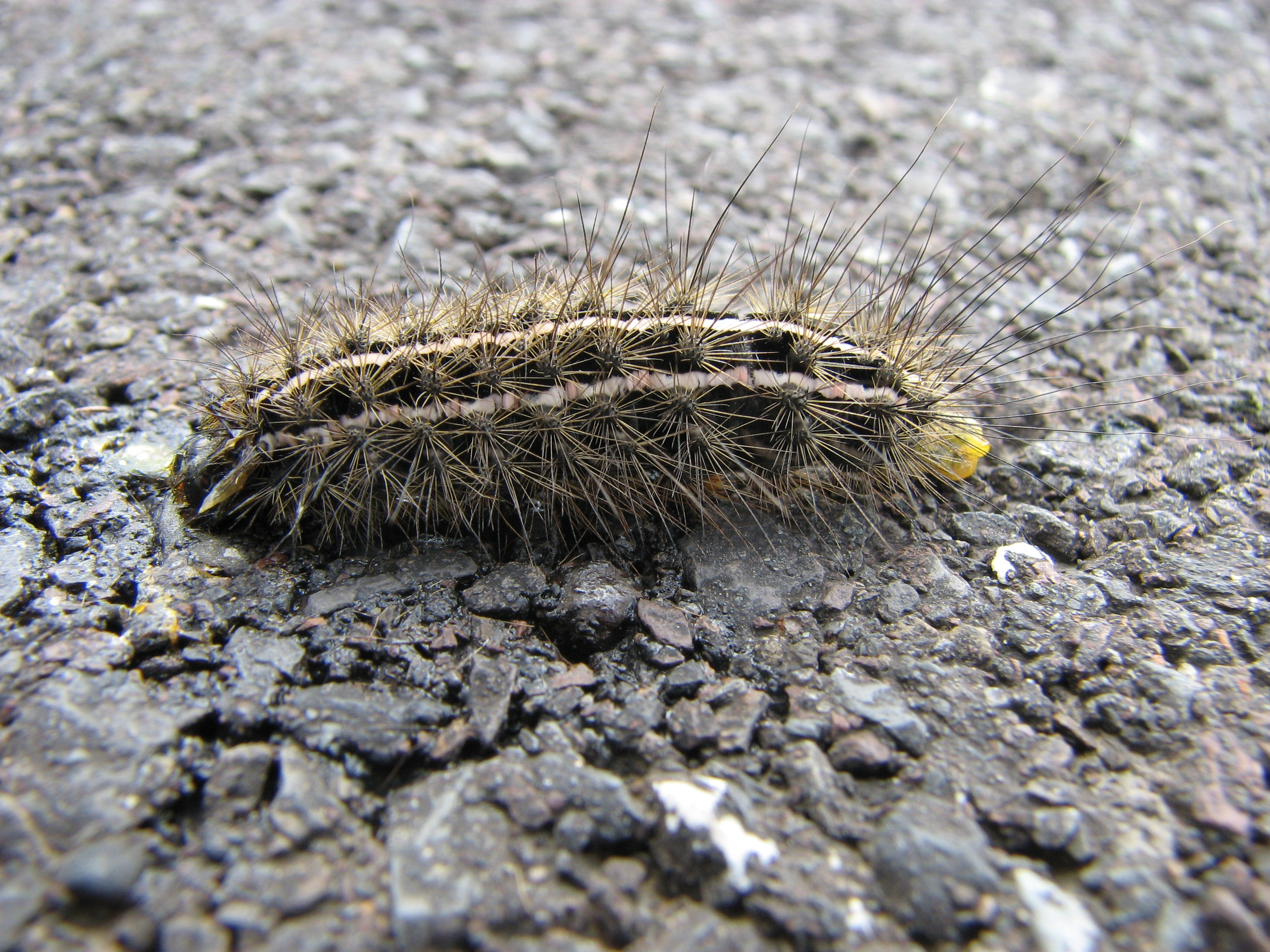
Apantesis arge caterpillar (Arctiinae)

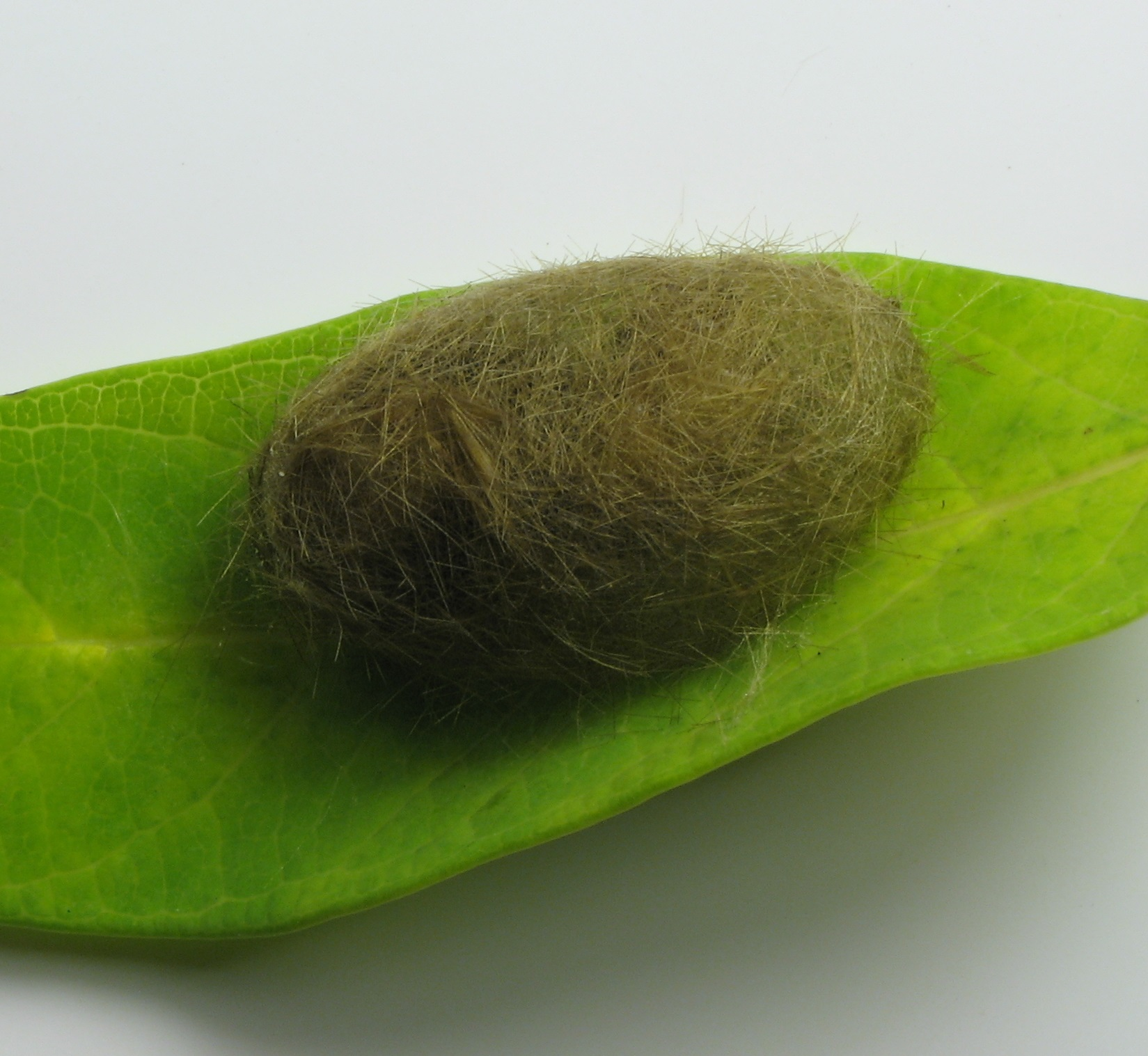
Halysidota tessellaris, cocoon

The Erebidae are a family of moths in the superfamily Noctuoidea. The family is among the largest families of moths by species count and contains a wide variety of well-known macromoth groups. The family includes the underwings (Catocala); litter moths (Herminiinae); tiger, lichen, footman and wasp moths (Arctiinae); tussock moths (Lymantriinae), including the arctic woolly bear moth (Gynaephora groenlandica); fruit-piercing moths (Calpinae and others); micronoctuoid moths (Micronoctuini); snout moths (Hypeninae); and zales, though many of these common names can also refer to moths outside the Erebidae (for example, crambid snout moths). Some of the erebid moths are called owlets.

The sizes of the adults range from among the largest of all moths (around 12 in (305 mm) wingspan in the white witch) to the smallest of the macromoths (0.25 in (6 mm) wingspan in some of the Micronoctuini). The coloration of the adults spans the full range of dull, drab, and camouflaged (e.g., Zale lunifera and litter moths) to vivid, contrasting, and colorful (e.g., Aganainae and tiger moths). The moths are found on all continents except Antarctica.

== Subfamilies ==
- Aganainae
- Anobinae
- Arctiinae – tiger, lichen, and wasp moths
- Boletobiinae
- Calpinae – piercing moths
- Erebinae – underwings and kin
- Eulepidotinae
- Herminiinae – litter moths
- Hypeninae – snout moths
- Hypenodinae – includes the micronoctuoids
- Hypocalinae
- Lymantriinae – tussock moths
- Pangraptinae
- Rivulinae
- Scolecocampinae
- Scoliopteryginae – piercing moths
- Tinoliinae
- Toxocampinae

== Description ==
Adult moths of Erebidae have quadrifid forewings and usually quadrifine hindwings, meaning that each wing includes a cubital vein that splits into four (explained further in the Classification section). The tribe Micronoctuini instead has bifine hindwings (meaning this same vein splits into two). Aside from this, adult Erebidae usually have an unscaled clypeofrons and broad forewings, and the hindwings often have patterns. Scoliopteryginae, Calpinae and some Erebinae have modified proboscises to pierce fruit skins. Lymantriinae and some Arctiina (Arctiinae) instead have a highly reduced proboscis. The overall appearance may be colourful (e.g. Arctiinae, Aganainae) or cryptic (e.g. Herminiinae).

Larvae are usually smooth in appearance, but larvae of Arctiinae (woolly bears) and Lymantriinae are hairy. Larvae of Arctiinae and Lymantriinae have fully developed prolegs, Aganainae and Herminiinae have fully developed or slightly reduced prolegs, and prolegs in some other subfamilies are reduced or absent as an adaptation to arboreal living (semi-loopers).

== Ecology ==
Adults of some Erebidae pierce fruit to suck out juices (leading them to be called "fruit-piercing moths"), and those of Calyptra can also pierce mammalian skin to suck out blood (hence "vampire moths").

Larvae are mostly herbivorous, like most lepidopteran larvae, and different taxa prefer different plants. Lithosiini (Arctiinae) larvae are unusual in feeding on algae and lichens (hence "lichen moths"). Most Herminiinae larvae feed on dead or withered leaves (hence "litter moths"), rather than living leaves.

== Classification ==
Among the Noctuoidea, the Erebidae can be broadly defined by the wing characteristics of the adults with support from phylogenetic studies. The cubital forewing vein, which runs outward from the base of a wing to the outer margin, splits into two (bifid), three (trifid), or four (quadrifid) veins from the medial area to the outer margin. These split veins are named M2, M3, CuA1, and CuA2 in order toward the inner margin. A trifid forewing has either a reduced or vestigial M2 vein or the M2 vein does not connect to the cubital veins, while M2 is as thick as M3 and connects or nearly connects to M3 in a quadrifid forewing. The same splitting of the hindwing cubital vein has analogous terms bifine, trifine, and quadrifine. The Erebidae typically have quadrifid forewings and quadrifine hindwings, though the Micronoctuini are exceptional with their bifine hindwings. Among the related families, most Erebidae are quadrifid moths like the Euteliidae, Nolidae, and Noctuidae and unlike the trifid Oenosandridae and Notodontidae. And among the quadrifid moths, the Erebidae have quadrifine hindwings like the typical Nolidae and Euteliidae and unlike the typical Noctuidae.

Phylogenetic studies in the present century have helped to clarify the relationships between the structurally diverse lineages within the Noctuoidea and within the Erebidae. Morphological studies had led to a classification in which the monophyletic Arctiinae, Lymantriinae, and Micronoctuini were treated as families, and the other erebid lineages were largely grouped within the Noctuidae. Recent studies combining genetic characteristics with the morphological ones revealed that the former Noctuidae were paraphyletic, and some of the lineages within the Noctuidae were more closely related to the Arctiinae and Lymantriinae subfamilies and the Micronoctuini tribe than to the other lineages within the Noctuidae.

The determination of these phylogenetic relationships has led to the present classification scheme in which several clades were rearranged while kept mostly intact and others were split apart. The Erebidae are one monophyletic family among six in the Noctuoidea. A more strictly defined family Noctuidae is also monophyletic, but the family lacks the quadrifine moths now placed as part of the Erebidae. Some subfamilies of the Noctuidae, such as the Herminiinae, were moved as a whole to Erebidae. Other subfamilies, including the Acontiinae and Calpinae, were each split apart. The Arctiinae became an erebid subfamily placed next to the closely related Herminiinae. The Lymantriinae became another erebid subfamily placed near the Pangraptinae. The rank of the Micronoctuini was changed from family to tribe to include the clade as a lineage within the Hypenodinae. The Erebidae are currently divided into 18 subfamilies, some of which are strongly supported by phylogenetic analysis and may persist through further study, while others are weakly supported and may be redefined again.
