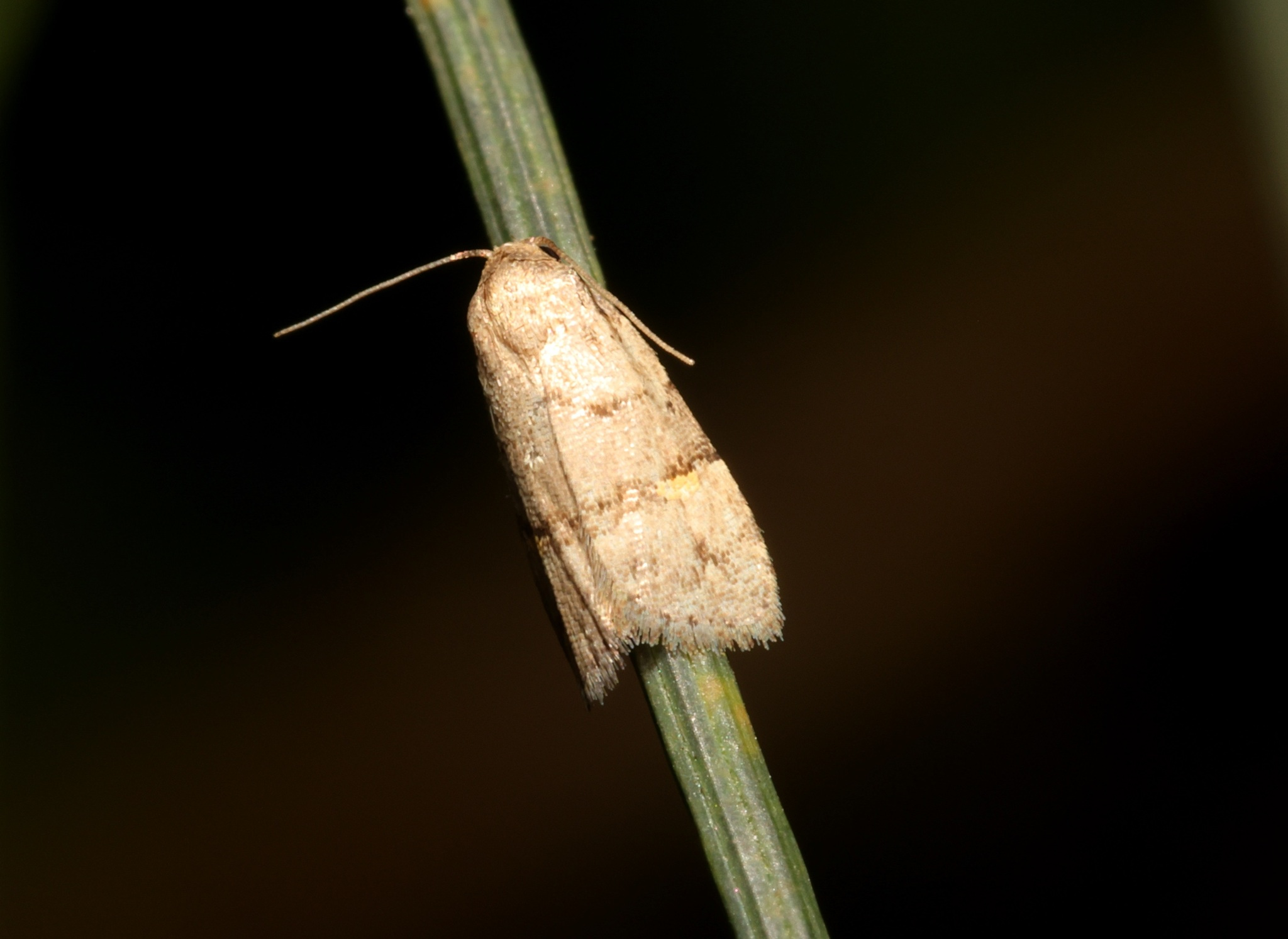
- Fustius sterlingi

Scientific classification
- Kingdom: Animalia
- Phylum: Arthropoda
- Class: Insecta
- Order: Lepidoptera
- Superfamily: Noctuoidea
- Family: Erebidae
- Tribe: Micronoctuini
- Subtribe: Tactusina; Fibiger, 2010

Synonyms
- Tactusinae Fibiger, 2010

= Tactusina =

Subtribe of moths

The Tactusina are a subtribe of moths of the family Erebidae. The clade was described by Michael Fibiger in 2010.

== Taxonomy ==
The subtribe was originally described as the subfamily Tactusinae of the family Micronoctuidae.

== Clades (former tribes) and genera ==
- Tactusa clade
  - Tactusa Fibiger, 2010
  - Conspica Fibiger, 2010
  - Tumula Fibiger, 2010
  - Dignius Fibiger, 2011
  - Vas Fibiger, 2010
  - Nilgerides Fibiger, 2010
  - Fustius Fibiger, 2011
  - Bruma Fibiger, 2010
  - Costasensora Fibiger, 2010
  - Longiantrum Fibiger, 2010
- Obscurior clade
  - Abes Fibiger, 2010
  - Asyprocessa Fibiger, 2010
  - Tantulius Fibiger, 2010
  - Asylemissa Fibiger, 2010
  - Clarior Fibiger, 2010
  - Obscurior Fibiger, 2011
  - Editum Fibiger, 2010
  - Asytegumen Fibiger, 2010
  - Dextella Fibiger, 2011
  - Paradoxica Fibiger, 2011
  - Dorsum Fibiger, 2011
