= Burma (disambiguation) =

Burma, officially the Republic of the Union of Myanmar, is a country in Southeast Asia.

Burma may also refer to:

== Entertainment ==
- Burma (film), a 2014 Indian film
- Burma (wargame), a 1975 board wargame that simulates the Burma campaign of World War II
- Burma VJ, a 2008 Danish documentary film

== Places ==
- Burma, Guyana, a village on the Atlantic Ocean coast of Guyana
- Burma Valley, Zimbabwe, low-lying area on the border between Zimbabwe and Mozambiqu

== Other uses ==
- Burma (elephant) (born 1982), an Asian elephant at Monarto Safari Park in South Australia
- B.U.R.M.A., a World War II postal acronym
- Nestor Burma, a fictional character from Léo Malet's crime novels

== See also ==
Related to the country

- Bamar people, the majority ethnic group of Myanmar
- Burmese (disambiguation), refers to something of, from, or related to the country
- Union of Burma (disambiguation), the official name of the country during various periods of its modern history

Other

- Barma (disambiguation)
- SS Birma, a British-built 1894 transatlantic passenger ship
- Bruma (disambiguation)
- Burmah (disambiguation)
- Burman, an Indian surname
- Burmann (disambiguation)
