= List of shipwrecks in November 1859 =

The list of shipwrecks in November 1859 includes ships sunk, foundered, grounded, or otherwise lost during November 1859.

== 1 November ==
List of shipwrecks: 1 November 1859
Ship	State	Description
Aguillee	United Kingdom	The smack was driven ashore on the coast of Caernarfonshire. She was refloated.
Alpha	United Kingdom	The ship collided with Speed (United Kingdom) and was driven ashore and sank at Portland, Dorset.
Amphitrite	France	The barque was driven ashore in Pendour Cove, Cornwall, United Kingdom. All seven or eight crew were rescued. She was on a voyage from Newport, Monmouthshire to Alexandria, Egypt. She had become a wreck by 9 November.
Anaïs	France	The ship was wrecked at Falmouth, Cornwall, United Kingdom. Her crew were rescued by the Coast Guard.
Batanga	United Kingdom	The barque was wrecked on the Hook Sand, in the Bristol Channel. Her eight crew were rescued by the tug Jane (United Kingdom). Batanga was on a voyage from Bristol, Gloucestershire to Africa.
Breeze	United Kingdom	The ship was abandoned off the coast of Pembrokeshire. She was towed in to Tenby the next day.
Brothers	United Kingdom	The sloop was wrecked at Milford Haven, Pembrokeshire. Her three crew were rescued by the Milford Haven Lifeboat.
Clarence	United Kingdom	The ship was driven against the railway viaduct and severely damaged at Folkestone, Kent.
Comet	United Kingdom	The ship was driven ashore near Nairn. She was on a voyage from Cromarty to Peterhead, Aberdeenshire.
Daphne	United Kingdom	The ship was driven ashore at Middleton, County Durham.
Darling	United Kingdom	The schooner was driven ashore at Scotstromhead, Aberdeenshire with the loss of one of her five crew. Survivors were rescued by rocket apparatus. She was on a voyage from Narva, Russia to Hartlepool, County Durham. She had become a wreck by 10 November.
Diana	United Kingdom	The ship was driven ashore at Port Dinorwic, Caernarfonshire. She was refloated.
Diligent	United Kingdom	The pilot skiff foundered off Lundy Island, Devon with the loss of all hands.
Despina	Ottoman Empire	The ship ran aground in Lough Foyle. She was on a voyage from Brăila to Londonderry, United Kingdom. She was refloated the next day and completed her voyage.
Duen	Norway	The brig was dismasted off Ouessant, Finistère, France. She was on a voyage from Fredrikshald to Paimbœuf, Loire-Inférieure, France. She was towed in to Cowes, Isle of Wight, United Kingdom, where she arrived on 3 November in a waterlogged condition.
Eagle	United Kingdom	The sloop was driven onto the wreck of Eliza (United Kingdom) and was wrecked at Milford Haven, Pembrokeshire.
Eliza	United Kingdom	The smack was driven against the quayside and sank at Milford Haven.
Elizabeth	Belgium	The schooner was wrecked at South Hook Point, Pembrokeshire, United Kingdom with the loss of all hands. She was on a voyage from Antwerp, Belgium to Milford Haven.
Elizabeth	United Kingdom	The ship was wrecked on the Mountbatten Rocks, on the coast of Devon. She was on a voyage from Queenstown, County Cork to Plymouth.
Geerdina	Netherlands	The koff was driven ashore in the Pas de Boeufs. She was on a voyage from an English port to Bayonne, Basses-Pyrénées. She was consequently condemned.
Gustaf	Sweden	The schooner was driven ashore and wrecked on Öland. Her crew were rescued. She was on a voyage from Söderhamn to Hull, Yorkshire, United Kingdom.
Hermine	Sweden	The ship collided with Deo Gloria ( Lübeck) and sank. Her crew were rescued by Deo Gloria. Hermine was on a voyage from Hartlepool to Malmö.
Hero	United Kingdom	The ship was driven ashore at Walberswick, Suffolk. Her crew were rescued. She was refloated on 14 November with the assistance of a tug and taken in to Lowestoft, Suffolk for repairs.
Hope	United Kingdom	The smack was driven ashore on the coast of Caernarfonshire. She was refloated.
Johanna Ernst	Danzig	The ship was wrecked off Anholt, Denmark. She was on a voyage from London, United Kingdom to Danzig.
Kezia Page	United Kingdom	The ship was driven against the railway viaduct and severely damaged at Folkestone.
Levant	United Kingdom	The ship was driven ashore at Plymouth.
Liberty	United Kingdom	The schooner was driven ashore in Llandudno Bay. Her crew were rescued.
Maria	United Kingdom	The brigantine was driven ashore at Moelfre, Anglesey and was abandoned by her crew.
Marin Johanne	Denmark	The schooner was driven ashore near "Rodeved". Her crew were rescued.
Mary Ann	United Kingdom	The sloop was abandoned off North Foreland, Kent. Her crew were rescued by the tug Challenger (United Kingdom), which subsequently towed Mary Ann in to Ramsgate, Kent.
Mayor	United Kingdom	The ship was abandoned in the North Sea off Winterton-on-Sea, Norfolk. Eight crew were rescued by a lugger. She was on a voyage from Sunderland, County Durham to the Nieuwdiep. Mayor was taken in to Great Yarmouth, Norfolk the next day.
Monica	United Kingdom	The ship foundered in the North Sea. Her crew survived. She was on a voyage from Newcastle upon Tyne, Northumberland to London.
Naomi	United Kingdom	The ship was driven ashore in the Isles of Scilly. She was on a voyage from Agrigento, Sicily to Liverpool, Lancashire. She was refloated on 12 November.
Nivenhead	Belgium	The brig was wrecked on the Herd Sand, in the North Sea off the coast of County Durham. Her crew were rescued by the South Shields Lifeboat. She was on a voyage from Ostend, West Flanders to South Shields, County Durham.
Ocean Queen	United Kingdom	The ship ran aground at Lowestoft and was damaged. She was on a voyage from Sunderland to London.
Peter and Sarah	United Kingdom	The ship ran aground and sank at Ilfracombe, Devon with the loss of her captain from her three crew. She was on avoyage from Newport to Newquay, Cornwall.
Rachele	Kingdom of the Two Sicilies	The brig was wrecked at Roquetas de Mar, Spain. Her crew were rescued. She was on a voyage from Taganrog, Russia to Falmouth.
Royalist	United Kingdom	The brig was driven ashore and wrecked at Southwold. Her crew were rescued. She was on a voyage from South Shields to London.
Salvia	United Kingdom	The brig ran aground on the Barnard Sand, in the North Sea off the coast of Suffolk. She was on a voyage from Sunderland to London She floated off and came ashore the next day at Covehithe, Suffolk. Her crew were rescued by the Coast Guard using Dennett's and Manby's rocket apparatus.
Sarnia	(United Kingdom of Great Britain and Ireland) Guernsey	The ship was driven ashore and wrecked in Rozel Bay, Alderney, Channel Islands. Her crew were rescued. She was on a voyage from Newcastle upon Tyne to Saint-Malo, Ille-et-Vilaine, France.
Sharston	United Kingdom	The schooner collided with the steamship Sligo (United Kingdom) and sank off the Copeland Islands, County Antrim. Her crew were rescued. She was on a voyage from Carrickfergus, County Antrim to Workington, Cumberland.
Shamrock	United Kingdom	The steamship ran aground on the Holm Sand, in the North Sea off the coast of Suffolk. Her fourteen crew were rescued by the RNLI Lowestoft lifeboat Victoria.
Sisters	United Kingdom	The ship was driven ashore and capsized at Clogher Head, County Louth. Her crew were rescued.
Star	(United Kingdom of Great Britain and Ireland) Jersey	The ship was abandoned in the English Channel 25 nautical miles (46 km) north of Cape Barfleur, Manche, France with the loss of two of her crew. Survivors were rescued by Sovinto (Flag unknown).
St. Nichol	United Kingdom	The brig sprang a leak and was abandoned in the North Sea 45 nautical miles (83 km) off Lowestoft. Her crew were rescued by the brig Venus (United Kingdom). St. Nichol was on a voyage from South Shields, County Durham to London.
Sunda	(United Kingdom of Great Britain and Ireland) Jersey	The barque was wrecked on the Rinly Sand, in the Bristol Channel. She was on a voyage from Jersey to Swansea, Glamorgan.
Twin Brothers	United Kingdom	The sloop was driven ashore and sank in Deadman's Bay, Devon. She was on a voyage from Poole, Dorset to Hayle, Cornwall.
Union	France	The ship was wrecked at Falmouth. Her crew were rescued by the Coast Guard.
Vansittart	United Kingdom	The schooner foundered in the North Sea. Her crew were rescued by the schooner Mary Ann (United Kingdom). Vansittart was on a voyage from Antwerp, Belgium to Runcorn, Cheshire.
Volante	Norway	The barque was driven ashore at Plymouth, Devon, United Kingdom.

== 2 November ==
List of shipwrecks: 2 November 1859
Ship	State	Description
Anton	Denmark	The ship was driven ashore and wrecked near Whitburn, County Durham, United Kingdom. Her crew were rescued by a lifeboat. She was on a voyage from Antwerp, Belgium to Newcastle upon Tyne, Northumberland, United Kingdom. She was refloated on 6 November and taken in to Sunderland, County Durham.
Catharina	Netherlands	The galiot was abandoned in the Atlantic Ocean. Her crew were rescued by Equity (United Kingdom). Catharina was on a voyage from Palermo, Sicily to London, United Kingdom.
Elizabeth	United Kingdom	The ship was driven ashore at Plymouth, Devon. She was on a voyage from Cork to Plymouth.
Emily	United Kingdom	The brig was wrecked on Texel, North Holland, Netherlands with the loss of all hands.
Gazelle	United Kingdom	The schooner ran aground at Wexford. She was on a voyage from Wexford to Lancaster, Lancashire. She was refloated.
George	Norway	The ship was driven ashore at Plymouth.
George and Mary	United Kingdom	The schooner capsized off Start Point, Devon and was severely damaged with the loss of a crew member. She was on a voyage from Newcastle upon Tyne to Dublin. She was righted and put in to Portsmouth, Hampshire.
Hero	United Kingdom	The ship ran aground in the Fal Estuary. She was refloated on 6 November.
Herold	Hamburg	The galiot was abandoned in the North Sea. Her crew were rescued. She was on a voyage from Karrebæksminde, Denmark to Leith, Lothian, United Kingdom.
Homer	United Kingdom	The brig was wrecked on Terschelling, Friesland, Netherlands. Her crew were rescued.
John Anderson	United Kingdom	The ship ran aground on the Haisborough Sands, in the North Sea off the coast of Norfolk. She was refloated but consequently sank. Her crew survived. She was on a voyage from South Shields, County Durham to Venice, Kingdom of Lombardy–Venetia.
Joseph Fletcher	United Kingdom	The ship was wrecked in the Ryukyu Islands, Japan with the subsequent loss of six of her 29 crew. She was on a voyage from Auckland, New Zealand to Shanghai, China.
Lillias	United Kingdom	The barque was driven ashore at Abersoch, Caernarfonshire. She was on a voyage from Liverpool, Lancashire to Quebec City, Province of Canada, British North America.
Malvina	United Kingdom	The ship was beached at Penarth, Glamorgan and sank. She was on a voyage from Cardiff, Glamorgan to London.
Neleus	United Kingdom	The ship foundered in the English Channel off the Isle of Wight. All on board were rescued by Oscar (Belgium) except one crew member who took to a boat and was reported missing. Neleus was on a voyage from Mauritius to London.
North Esk	United Kingdom	The brig ran aground and was wrecked at Bideford, Devon. Her six crew were rescued by the Braunton Lifeboat. She was on a voyage from Llanelly, Glamorgan to Havre de Grâce, Seine-Inférieure, France.
Olinda	France	The barque was driven ashore and wrecked at West Wittering, Sussex, United Kingdom. She was on a voyage from Havre de Grâce to Pernambuco, Brazil.
Pilot	United Kingdom	The schooner was wrecked at Thisted, Denmark. Her crew were rescued. She was on a voyage from Pillau, Prussia to Plymouth, Devon.
Princess	United Kingdom	The ship was abandoned in the Atlantic Ocean. All eighteen people on board were rescued by Elizabeth (United Kingdom). Princess was on a voyage from Quebec City to Warrenpoint, County Down.
Refuge	United Kingdom	The brig was wrecked on the Northam Barrows, in the Bristol Channel with the loss of all hands.
Roelfina Roelina	Netherlands	The ship sank in the Black Sea. She was on a voyage from Sulina, Ottoman Empire to Falmouth, Cornwall, United Kingdom.
Sanda	(United Kingdom of Great Britain and Ireland) Jersey	The barque was driven ashore on the Kenfig Sands, Glamorgan. Her crew were rescued.
Sarah	United Kingdom	The Mersey Flat capsized in the River Mersey with the loss of all hands.
Shamrock	United Kingdom	The ship driven ashore at Plymouth. Her crew were rescued. She was on a voyage from Dublin to Plymouth.
Shamrock	United Kingdom	The steamship was wrecked on the Holm Sand, in the North Sea off the coast of Suffolk. Her fourteen crew were rescued by the Lowestoft Lifeboat. She was on a voyage from South Shields to Dublin.
Wanderer	United Kingdom	The barque was wrecked at Rock's Nose, Devon with the loss of all eleven crew.

== 3 November ==
List of shipwrecks: 3 November 1859
Ship	State	Description
African	United Kingdom	The steamship was disabled in the Bristol Channel with the loss of four of her crew. She was beached at Padstow, Cornwall. She was on a voyage from Liverpool, Lancashire to Malta and Constantinople, Ottoman Empire. African was later refloated and taken in to Padstow.
Aimable Virginie	France	The schooner foundered in the North Sea off the Paardemarkt Lightship (Belgium). Her crew were rescued. She was on a voyage from South Shields, County Durham, United Kingdom to Bayonne, Basses-Pyrénées.
Eden Castas	United Kingdom	The ship ran aground at Aberdeen. She was on a voyage from Newcastle upon Tyne, Northumberland to Ceylon. She was refloated with the assistance of a tug.
Frederick Wilhelm	Danzig	The brig struck a sunken rock and was beached at Stornoway, Isle of Lewis, United Kingdom. She was on a voyage from Chester, Cheshire, United Kingdom to Danzig.
James Scott	United Kingdom	The ship ran aground off Hellevoetsluis, Zeeland, Netherlands.
Lelia	United Kingdom	The schooner was wrecked at Ventnor, Isle of Wight with the loss of one of her seven crew. Survivors were rescued by the Coast Guard. She was on a voyage from Nassau, Bahamas to London.
Maria	Netherlands	The schooner was wrecked on Eierland, North Holland. Her crew were rescued. She was on a voyage from Amsterdam, North Holland to Trieste.
Mary	United Kingdom	The ship foundered in the North Sea 5 nautical miles (9.3 km) north of Happisburgh, Norfolk. Five crew were rescued. She was on a voyage from Sunderland, County Durham to Cowes, Isle of Wight.
Ornen	United Kingdom	The brig was driven ashore and severely damaged at Tulcea, Ottoman Empire. .
Undine	United Kingdom	The schooner ran aground on the Barber Sand, in the North Sea off the coast of Suffolk. She was on a voyage from Harwich, Essex to Sunderland. She was refloated and put in to Great Yarmouth, Norfolk in a severely leaky condition.
Ville de Greande	France	The full-rigged ship foundered off Arcachon, Gironde with the loss of one life. She was on a voyage from New Orleans, Louisiana, United States to Bordeaux, Gironde.

== 4 November ==
List of shipwrecks: 4 November 1859
Ship	State	Description
Beatrice	United Kingdom	The ship struck the Gabbard Sand, off the north Kent coast. She was on a voyage from South Shields, County Durham to Hong Kong. She was later refloated and resumed her voyage, but put in to Plymouth, Devon on 10 November in a leaky condition.
Charles Brooker	United States	The ship was driven ashore and wrecked 12 nautical miles (22 km) north of Cape Florida, Florida. She was on a voyage from New Orleans, Louisiana to Liverpool, Lancashire.
Fevonia	United Kingdom	The ship was driven ashore and wrecked at Great Yarmouth, Norfolk. Five crew were rescued.
Gustav	Greifswald	The ship was run down and sunk off the Kullen Lighthouse, Sweden by the steamship Emelie (Prussia) with the loss of all but one of her crew. She was on a voyage from Newcastle upon Tyne, Northumberland, United Kingdom to Griefswald.
Heidelberg	United States	The full-rigged ship was driven ashore and wrecked 12 nautical miles (22 km) north of Cape Florida. All on board were rescued. She was on a voyage from New Orleans to Havre de Grâce, Seine-Inférieure, France. Heidelberg was later refloated and taken in to Key West, Florida.
John G. Coster	United States	The ship was wrecked on the Galloper Sand, in the North Sea off the coast of Suffolk, United Kingdom. All twenty crew were rescued by a French fishing lugger. She was on a voyage from South Shields, County Durham, United Kingdom to New York.
Lizzie Gowan	United Kingdom	The ship ran aground and was severely damaged at Ramsgate, Kent. She was on a voyage from London to Trieste.
Mary Brown	United Kingdom	The ship sprang a leak and sank in the North Sea 5 nautical miles (9.3 km) north of Happisburgh, Norfolk. She was on a voyage from Sunderland, County Durham to Cowes, Isle of Wight.
Mary Coe	United States	The ship was driven ashore and wrecked 12 nautical miles (22 km) north of Cape Florida She was on a voyage from Mobile, Alabama to Havre de Grâce.
Nagler	Prussia	The steamship ran aground on "Osroe". She was on a voyage from Stockholm, Sweden to Stettin.
Norden	United Kingdom	The barque was abandoned in the Atlantic Ocean. Her sixteen crew were rescued by the schooner Mathilde (France). Norden was on a voyage from Quebec City, Province of Canada, British North America to Hartlepool, County Durham.
Peace	United Kingdom	The sloop was lost at Bideford, Devon. Her crew were rescued. She was on a voyage from Newport, Monmouthshire to Plymouth, Devon.
Rabona	United Kingdom	The schooner was driven ashore near North Berwick, Lothian with the loss of all hands.
Senator	United Kingdom	The ship was abandoned in a sinking condition. Her crew were rescued by the brig Favoritan (Flag unknown). Senator was on a voyage from Liverpool to Bombay, India.
Susanna	Kingdom of Hanover	The ship was struck by lightning and destroyed by fire off Kragerø, Norway. Her crew were rescued.
West Docks	United Kingdom	The ship was driven ashore at Newcastle, County Down. She was refloated on 10 November and taken in to Dublin.

== 5 November ==
List of shipwrecks: 5 November 1859
Ship	State	Description
Christina	Sweden	The brigantine ran aground at Deal, Kent, United Kingdom. She was on a voyage from Rotterdam, South Holland, Netherlands to Valparaíso, Chile. Christina was refloated on 7 November and taken in to Ramsgate, Kent, United Kingdom.
Elizabeth	France	The ship was driven ashore near La Tremblade, Charente-Inférieure. All on board were rescued.
Gotha	Hamburg	The steamship was driven ashore and wrecked near Agger, Denmark. Her crew were rescued. She was on a voyage from Gothenburg, Sweden to Hamburg .
Koogerpolder	Netherlands	The ship was wrecked south of the mouth of the Rio Grande. Her crew were rescued. She was on a voyage from Lisbon, Portugal to a Brazilian port.
Raymond	France	The lugger was driven ashore near Royan, Seine-Inférieure.
Sainte Marie	France	The full-rigged ship ran aground off Royan, Seine-Inférieure. She was on a voyage from La Guaira, Venezuela to Bordeaux, Gironde.
Tvendre Brodre	Duchy of Holstein	The brig was abandoned in the North Sea. Her crew were rescued by Jones (United Kingdom). Tvendre Brodre was on a voyage from Newcastle upon Tyne, Northumberland, United Kingdom to Christiania, Norway.

== 6 November ==
List of shipwrecks: 6 November 1859
Ship	State	Description
Ann	United Kingdom	The brigantine ran aground on the Whiting Sand, in the North Sea off the coast of Suffolk. She was on a voyage from Hartlepool, County Durham to Rochester, Kent. She was refloated and put in to Lowestoft, Suffolk in a leaky condition.
Bomarsund	United Kingdom	The barque was driven ashore at Lowestoft. She was on a voyage from Newcastle upon Tyne, Northumberland to Cartagena, Spain. She was refloated the next day and taken in to Lowestoft in a leaky condition.
Feronia	United Kingdom	The schooner was driven ashore and wrecked at Great Yarmouth, Norfolk. Her crew were rescued by the Great Yarmouth Lifeboat. She was on a voyage from Hartlepool, County Durham to Exeter, Devon.
Funf Gebroeders	Kingdom of Hanover	The ship was wrecked on Spijkeroog.
Gold Hunter	(United Kingdom of Great Britain and Ireland) British North America	The schooner was abandoned in the Gulf of Saint Lawrence. Her crew were rescued by Favourite (Portugal). Gold Hunter was on a voyage from Barrington, Nova Scotia to Newfoundland.
Herkules	Denmark	The barque ran aground on the Roar Sand, in the English Channel. She was refloated with assistance from the Coast Guard and towed in to The Downs.
Offspring	United Kingdom	The barque was driven ashore and wrecked at Grand Havre, Guernsey, Channel Islands. Her crew were rescued. She was on a voyage from Montevideo, Uruguay to Newcastle upon Tyne. She was refloated on 15 November. Although severely damaged, she was repaired and returned to service.
Penelope	United Kingdom	The brig was abandoned in the Atlantic Ocean (49°31′N 19°00′W). Her crew were rescued by Felicia (United States). Penelope was on a voyage from Quebec City, Province of Canada, British North America to Newcastle upon Tyne.
Policy	United Kingdom	The brig was driven ashore and wrecked near Tenby, Pembrokeshire. Her crew were rescued by rocket apparatus. She was on a voyage from Quebec City, Province of Canada, British North America to Llanelly, Glamorgan.
Princess Victoria	United Kingdom	The ship was run down and sunk by the steamship Leichten (Hamburg). She was on a voyage from the River Tyne to London.
Selina	France	The ship was driven ashore and wrecked at Hela, Prussia. She was on a voyage from Danzig to Cherbourg, Seine-Inférieure.
Victoria	Spain	The steamship ran aground and sank at Jacmel, Haiti. All on board were rescued.

== 7 November ==
List of shipwrecks: 7 November 1859
Ship	State	Description
Ann	United Kingdom	The ship foundered in the North Sea off the coast of Berwickshire. Some of her crew were rescued by the schooner Hawk (United Kingdom).
Ark	United Kingdom	The ship foundered in the North Sea off the coast of Berwickshire. Her crew were rescued by the schooner Hawk (United Kingdom).
Beverley	United Kingdom	The schooner was wrecked on the shore one mile south–west of Upton Cliff, near Bude, Cornwall. Her crew and one female passenger were rescued by rocket apparatus and her captain jumped overboard and reached the shore.
Catherine Cornelia	Netherlands	The ship was driven ashore at Blåvandshuk, Denmark. Her crew were rescued. She was on a voyage from Peterhead, Aberdeenshire, Cornwall, United Kingdom to Hamburg.
Chinchas	United States	The ship was driven onto Loe Bar, Mount's Bay, United Kingdom when her anchor cable parted in high winds. Four, five or seven of her 35 crew lost their lives She was bound for Rio de Janeiro, Brazil from Liverpool, Lancashire, United Kingdom with 3,000 tons of coal and was the largest sailing ship to be wrecked on the bar.
Delphine Elise	France	The ship ran aground on the Newcombe Sand, in the North Sea off the coast of Suffolk, United Kingdom. She was on a voyage from Dunkirk, Nord to Fécamp, Pas-de-Calais. She was refloated and taken in to Lowestoft, Suffolk in a leaky condition.
Emilie	Danzig	The schooner was driven ashore and wrecked on Læsø, Denmark. She was on a voyage from Grimsby, Lincolnshire, United Kingdom to Riga, Russia.
Gezina Pronk	Danzig	The ship was driven ashore and wrecked on Skagen, Denmark. She was on a voyage from Danzig to Rotterdam, South Holland, Netherlands.
Koogerpolder	Duchy of Holstein	The ship was driven ashore and wrecked on Skagen. She was on a voyage from Newcastle upon Tyne to Neustadt in Holstein.
Problem	United Kingdom	The ship foundered in the North Sea 15 nautical miles (28 km) off the coast of County Durham. Her crew survived.
Rebecca and Elizabeth	United Kingdom	The schooner ran aground on the Stoney Binks, in the North Sea off the mouth of the Humber. Her crew were rescued by the Spurn Lifeboat. She was refloated and towed in to Grimsby, Lincolnshire in a derelict condition by the steamship Minnet (United Kingdom).
Tyrol	Austrian Empire	The barque was wrecked on the Little Burbo Bank, in Liverpool Bay with the loss of all on board. She was on a voyage from Sulina, Ottoman Empire to Liverpool.

== 8 November ==
List of shipwrecks: 8 November 1859
Ship	State	Description
Athlone	United Kingdom	The full-rigged ship sprang a leak and was abandoned in the Atlantic Ocean. Her crew were rescued by Charles Brooke (United Kingdom). Athlone was on a voyage from Liverpool, Lancashire to Galveston, Texas, United States.
Christian	United Kingdom	The ship collided with another vessel and foundered off Lismore, County Waterford.
Epaminodas	United States	The full-rigged ship was abandoned in the Atlantic Ocean (44°30′N 42°53′W). Her crew were rescued by William Vail (United Kingdom). Epaminodas was on a voyage from South Shields, County Durham, United Kingdom to Quebec City, Province of Canada, British North America.
Fame	United Kingdom	The schooner was driven ashore and wrecked at La Heve, Seine-Inférieure. Her crew were rescued. She was on a voyage from Rouen, Seine-Inférieure to South Shields, County Durham.
Fame	United Kingdom	The brig collided with the barque Carl (Sweden) and sank in the North Sea off the coast of Norfolk. Her five crew were rescued by Carl. Fame was on a voyage from Sunderland, County Durham to Maldon, Essex.
Friedrich Scalla Waack	Prussia	The barque sank off Gullholmen, Norway.

== 9 November ==
List of shipwrecks: 9 November 1859
Ship	State	Description
Aire	United Kingdom	The sloop foundered in the North Sea off the coast of Norfolk. Her crew were rescued. She was on a voyage from Hull, Yorkshire to London.
Bombay	Austrian Empire	The steamship was driven ashore on Ariel Island, in Quareiro Bay. All on board were rescued. She was on a voyage from Constantinople, Ottoman Empire to Trieste.
Elizabeth and Jane	United Kingdom	The ship schooner ran aground on the Margate Sand. She was on a voyage from London to Bristol, Gloucestershire.
Enzie	Grand Duchy of Tuscany	The brig was wrecked on "Stoneskar", Russia. She was on a voyage from Livorno to Kronstadt, Russia.
Four Brothers	United Kingdom	The schooner capsized 8 nautical miles (15 km) east of the Dudgeon Lightship ( Trinity House) with the loss of all bar her captain, who was rescued by a French fishing vessel. She was on a voyage from Hull, Yorkshire to Cherbourg, Seine-Inférieure, France. An attempt was made to tow her in to Great Yarmouth, Norfolk but she sank.
Hawk	United Kingdom	The schooner foundered 60 nautical miles (110 km) east of Gibraltar. Her five crew survived. She was on a voyage from Brăila, Ottoman Empire to Cork via Constantinople, Ottoman Empire.
Margaret	United Kingdom	The sloop was driven ashore and severely damaged at Dunfanaghy, County Donegal. She was later refloated and placed under repair.
New Astley	United Kingdom	The brig sprang a leak and was beached at Spittal Point, Northumberland, where she was wrecked. Her six crew were rescued by the Berwick Lifeboat. New Astley was on a voyage from Seaham, County Durham to Aberdeen. She was refloated on 17 November and taken in to South Shields, County Durham.
Newnham	United Kingdom	The ship ran aground in the River Wyre. She was on a voyage from Fleetwood, Lancashire to Jacmel, Haiti. She was refloated the next day and resumed her voyage.

== 10 November ==
List of shipwrecks: 10 November 1859
Ship	State	Description
Albert Borsig	Prussia	The ship ran aground on the Gabbard Sand. She was on a voyage from Danzig to Liverpool, Lancashire, United Kingdom. She was refloated and put in to Ramsgate, Kent, United Kingdom in a leaky condition.
Angeline	France	The schooner ran aground on the Cork Sand, in the North Sea off the coast of Suffolk, United Kingdom.
Charlotte	United Kingdom	The brigantine ran aground on the Mouse Sand, in the Thames Estuary. She was on a voyage from Hartlepool, County Durham to London. She was refloated with the assistance of five smacks and assisted in to Sheerness, Kent.
Cochrane	United Kingdom	The steamship ran aground at Lowestoft, Suffolk.
Eagle	(United Kingdom of Great Britain and Ireland) British North America	The barque was abandoned in the Atlantic Ocean (37°24′N 45°58′W). Her crew were rescued by the schooner Beertha Hendrika (Netherlands). Eagle was on a voyage from Newport, Monmouthshire to Bermuda.
Emilie	France	The brig sank at Havre de Grâce, Seine-Inférieure.
Emulous	United Kingdom	The brig was driven ashore in Luce Bay. She was on a voyage from Glasgow, Renfrewshire to Berbice, British Guiana. She was refloated on 25 November and towed to "Drumore" in a crippled condition by the tug Wonder (United Kingdom).
Friends	United Kingdom	The schooner collided with Fitzjames (United Kingdom) in the River Mersey and was beached at Tranmere, Cheshire. She was on a voyage from Belfast, County Antrim to Liverpool, Lancashire.
Lord Delaval	United Kingdom	The ship was sighted off Constantinople, Ottoman Empire whilst on a voyage from Odesa to the Clyde. No further trace, presumed foundered with the loss of all sixteen crew.

== 11 November ==
List of shipwrecks: 11 November 1859
Ship	State	Description
Doris	United Kingdom	The brig foundered off Brouwershaven, Zeeland, Netherlands. Her crew were rescued. She was on a voyage from Newcastle upon Tyne, Northumberland to Rotterdam, South Holland, Netherlands.
Duke of Wellington	United Kingdom	The ship was destroyed by fire in the Atlantic Ocean 200 nautical miles (370 km) west of Cape Finisterre, Spain. Her crew were rescued by the schooner Idne (France). Duke of Wellington was on a voyage from Liverpool, Lancashire to Bombay, India.
Gleaner	United Kingdom	The ship collided with Mary Ann and Eliza (United Kingdom) and sank off the coast of Cornwall. Her crew survived.
Intrepido	Kingdom of the Two Sicilies	The wrecked 2 nautical miles (3.7 km) west of Bari. She was on a voyage from Constantinople, Ottoman Empire to Falmouth, Cornwall or Queenstown, County Cork, United Kingdom.
Pilgrim	United Kingdom	The ship ran aground on the Hinder Bank, in the North Sea off the Dutch coast. She was refloated.
San Giorgio	United Principalities	The ship foundered off Varna. Her crew were rescued.
Tanfield	United Kingdom	The ship foundered in the Atlantic Ocean off Ouessant, Finistère. Her crew were rescued. She was on a voyage from Sunderland, County Durham to Alicante, Spain.
Wilhelmina Maria	Netherlands	The ship was wrecked in the Atlantic Ocean. Her crew were rescued by Linda (United Kingdom).

== 12 November ==
List of shipwrecks: 12 November 1859
Ship	State	Description
Agnes	United Kingdom	The schooner was wrecked 1.5 nautical miles (2.8 km) north of Arbroath, Forfarshire. Her crew survived. She was on a voyage from Sunderland, County Durham to Montrose, Forfarshire.
Agnes Sophia	United Kingdom	The brigantine was wrecked at Palermo, Kingdom of the Two Sicilies. Her crew were rescued. She was on a voyage from the Clyde to Palermo.
Ardentinny	United Kingdom	The paddle steamer ran aground at Mobile, Alabama, United States. She was on a voyage from Mobile to Londonderry. She was refloated and towed in to Mobile.
Ashria	Grand Duchy of Oldenburg	The galiot collided with Kingston (United Kingdom) and sank off the Falsterbo Lighthouse, Sweden. Her crew were rescued by Kingston. Ashria was on a voyage from Stockholm, Sweden to Copenhagen, Denmark.
Captain Cook	United Kingdom	The ship sank in Table Bay. She was refloated the next day with assistance from Imperador (United Kingdom).
Friends	United Kingdom	The ship sprang a leak and sank off Morte Point, Devon. Her crew survived. She was on a voyage from Cardiff, Glamorgan to Waterford.
Herald	United Kingdom	The brig was wrecked at Cape Care Bournon, Russia with the loss of all but three of her nine crew.
Imogene	United Kingdom	The brig foundered in the Black Sea 50 nautical miles (93 km) off the entrance to the Bosphorus. Her eleven crew were rescued by Black Swan (United Kingdom). Imogene was on a voyage from Berdyansk, Russia to a British port.
Joseph Marianne	France	The brigantine was wrecked at Palermo. Her crew were rescued.
Laure Alexandrine	France	The brigantine was wrecked at Palermo. Her crew were rescued.
Leonora	United Kingdom	The ship ran aground at Shoreham-by-Sea, Sussex. She was on a voyage from Hartlepool, County Durham to Shoreham-by-Sea. She was refloated and taken in to Shoreham-by-Sea in a leaky condition.
Washington	United Kingdom	The ship ran aground at Liverpool, Lancashire. She was on a voyage from Liverpool to Alexandria, Egypt. She was refloated and put back to Liverpool in a leaky condition.

== 13 November ==
List of shipwrecks: 13 November 1859
Ship	State	Description
Elizabeth	United Kingdom	The brig was wrecked near Kiliya, Russia with the loss of three or eight of her eleven crew. She was on a voyage from Sulina, Ottoman Empire to a British port.
Etienne	France	The ship was wrecked at "Media". Her crew were rescued. She was on a voyage from Sulina to an English port.
Frith	Sweden	The ship was abandoned in the Irish Sea 12 nautical miles (22 km) off the coast of Pembrokeshire, United Kingdom. Her crew survived. She was on a voyage from Galaţi, Ottoman Empire to Gloucester, United Kingdom.
Hannah	United Kingdom	The schooner struck the pier at Lowestoft, Suffolk and drove her anchor through her bows. She was beached, but was refloated following temporary repairs and taken in to Lowestoft.
Jamestown	United States	The ship ran aground on the wreck of Arab (Flag unknown), on the Middle Ground, off Mobile, Alabama. She was on a voyage from Mobile to Liverpool, Lancashire, United Kingdom. She had become a wreck by 15 November.
Madagas	United Kingdom	The barque was wrecked near Kiliya, Russia with the loss of fifteen of the nineteen people on board. She was on a voyage from Sulina to a British port.
Père des Braves	France	The ship sank 10 nautical miles (19 km) east of Cette, Hérault. Her crew were rescued. She was on a voyage from Marseille, Bouches-du-Rhône to Algiers, Algeria.
Progres Lievous	Belgium	The barque was driven ashore near Howth, County Dublin, United Kingdom. She was on a voyage from Liverpool to Ostend, West Flanders. She was refloated and towed in to Belfast, County Antrim in a leaky condition.
Sansone	Flag unknown	The ship was lost at "Massilikos".

== 14 November ==
List of shipwrecks: 14 November 1859
Ship	State	Description
Active	Sweden	The sloop sprang a leak and was beached on Öland, where she was wrecked. She was on a voyage from Visby to Stettin.
Ant	(United Kingdom of Great Britain and Ireland) British North America	The barque was abandoned in the Atlantic Ocean in a sinking condition. Her crew were rescued.
Cockerills	United Kingdom	The barque was abandoned in the Mediterranean Sea. Her crew were rescued by the brig Indifferente ( Kingdom of the Two Sicilies). Cockerills was on a voyage from Sulina, Ottoman Empire to Queenstown, County Cork.
Elizabeth	Lübeck	The ship was wrecked on Saaremaa, Russia. She was on a voyage from Lübeck to "Borgo".
Heart of Oak	United Kingdom	The barque was abandoned in the Mediterranean Sea off Malta. Her crew were rescued by the brig San Nicolo ( Kingdom of Sardinia). Heart of Oak was on a voyage from Alexandria, Egypt to Liverpool, Lancashire.
Magenta	United Kingdom	The ship ran aground in the Saint Lawrence River. She was on a voyage from Quebec City, Province of Canada, British North America to Liverpool, Lancashire.
Mountain Maid	(United Kingdom of Great Britain and Ireland) New South Wales	The schooner was wrecked at Millsom's Point. She was on a voyage from Newcastle to Sydney.

== 15 November ==
List of shipwrecks: 15 November 1859
Ship	State	Description
Active	United Kingdom	The sloop ran aground on the Daseth Sand, in the North Sea and was severely damaged. She was on a voyage from Goole, Yorkshire to King's Lynn, Norfolk. She was refloated and taken in to King's Lynn.
Augusta	United Kingdom	The ship was driven ashore near "Saint Valier", Province of Canada, British North America. She was on a voyage from Quebec City, Province of Canada to Stockton-on-Tees, County Durham. Augusta was refloated on 1 December and towed back to Quebec City.
Cora Linn	United States	The ship was wrecked in Church Bay. Her crew were rescued. She was on a voyage from New York to the Clyde.
Ernst	Norway	The ship was driven ashore and wrecked at the Kilios Castle, Constantinople, Ottoman Empire.
Hannibal	Belgium	The ship was wrecked at Hong Kong.
Herald of the Morning	(United Kingdom of Great Britain and Ireland) British North America	The ship was severely damaged by fire in Hobsons Bay, New South Wales, and never was repaired. Her hulk was scuttled in 1889.
Irishman	United Kingdom	The schooner was driven ashore in the Belfast Lough at Gray Point, County Antrim.
Magellan	United Kingdom	The ship ran aground on the Flemish Banks, in the North Sea. She floated off and was subsequently driven ashore and wrecked 14 nautical miles (26 km) south of Ostend, West Flanders, Belgium. Her crew were rescued. She was on a voyage from Stettin to Liverpool, Lancashire.
Paine	United Kingdom	The schooner was driven ashore at La Heve, Seine-Inférieure, France. Her crew were rescued. She was on a voyage from Bordeaux, Gironde, France to an English port.
Swift	United Kingdom	The ship was wrecked at Sulina, Ottoman Empire with the loss of three of her crew.
Solway	United Kingdom	The barque was wrecked at Sulina. Her crew were rescued by the Sulina Lifeboat.
Watson	United Kingdom	The sloop was abandoned in the North Sea 20 nautical miles (37 km) south east of St. Abbs Head, Berwickshire. Her crew survived. She was on a voyage from South Shields, County Durham to Fraserburgh, Aberdeenshire.

== 16 November ==
List of shipwrecks: 16 November 1859
Ship	State	Description
Campbell	United Kingdom	The brig was run down and sunk off Walmer, Kent by the steamship Foyle (United Kingdom. Her crew were rescued by the Walmer Lifeboat. One sailor from Foyle was lost attempting to rescue Campbell's crew. Campbell was on a voyage from London to Whitehaven, Cumberland.
Eclat	United Kingdom	The sloop was driven ashore at Ardrossan, Ayrshire. She was on a voyage from Swansea, Glamorgan to Glasgow, Renfrewshire. She had become a wreck by 21 November.
Lyra	United Kingdom	The brig caught fire in the North Sea 6 nautical miles (11 km) off Brancaster, Norfolk and was abandoned. Her crew were rescued by the smack Band of Hope (United Kingdom). Lyra was on a voyage from Nyhamna, Norway to Fosdyke Bridge, Lincolnshire. She was towed in to Grimsby, Lincolnshire on 19 November, burnt down to the waterline.

== 17 November ==
List of shipwrecks: 17 November 1859
Ship	State	Description
Bee	United Kingdom	The ship was run down by a barque and sank in the English Channel 5 nautical miles (9.3 km) off Hastings, Sussex. Her crew survived.
Burmah	United Kingdom	The ship was sighted in the Pacific Ocean (48°S 97°E) whilst on a voyage from London to New Zealand. No further trace, presumed subsequently foundered with the loss of all on board.
HMS Intrepid	Royal Navy	The Intrepid-class gunboat ran ashore near Mytilene, Kingdom of Greece.
Kate	United Kingdom	The ship was driven ashore at Ballina, County Mayo. She was on a voyage from Ballina to Liverpool, Lancashire.
Kong Sverre	Norway	The brig was driven ashore by ice and wrecked on the Arabat Spit, in the Sea of Azov. Her crew were rescued. She was on a voyage from Taganrog, Russia to an English port.
Magellan	Prussia	The barque was driven ashore near Middelkerke, West Flanders, Belgoum. She was on a voyage from Stettin to Liverpool.
Mary Stewart	United Kingdom	The ship ran aground on the Blacktail Sand, in the Thames Estuary. She was refloated the next dya and taken in to Gravesend, Kent.
Ramona	United Kingdom	The steamship was severely damaged by fire at Bermondsey, Surrey.
Sugeberg Caroline	France	The ship was driven ashore and wrecked on Lindholmsflat. Her crew were rescued. She was on a voyage from Hartlepool, County Durham, United Kingdom to Horsens, Denmark.
True Blue	United Kingdom	The sloop was driven ashore and wrecked at South Shields, County Durham. Her crew were rescued.

== 18 November ==
List of shipwrecks: 18 November 1859
Ship	State	Description
Acorn	United Kingdom	The ship was wrecked at Hook of Holland, South Holland, Netherlands. Her crew were rescued. She was on a voyage from South Shields, County Durham to Rotterdam, South Holland.
Adonis	(United Kingdom of Great Britain and Ireland) British North America	The schooner was wrecked on the Île aux Caudres. She was on a voyage from Sydney, Nova Scotia to Quebec City, Province of Canada.
Ardent	United Kingdom	The ship was driven ashore at Maryport, Cumberland. She was on a voyage from Belfast, County Antrim to Maryport. She had become a wreck by 21 November.
Brunette	United States	The ship was abandoned in the Atlantic Ocean. Her crew were rescued by the full-rigged ship Armisade (Portugal). Brunette was on a voyage from Livorno, United Provinces of Central Italy to Philadelphia, Pennsylvania.
Empress Eugenie, and Jane Ann and Elizabeth	United Kingdom	The schooner Jane Ann and Elizabeth was run into by the steamship Empress Eugenie (United Kingdom) and sank in the Rock Channel. Her crew were rescued by Empress Eugenie. Jane Ann and Elizabeth was on a voyage from Neath, Glamorgan to Liverpool, Lancashire. She was refloated on 21 November and beached at New Brighton, Cheshire. Empress Eugenie was beached at Egremont, Lancashire. She was on a voyage from Liverpool to London. She was refloated the next day and taken in to Liverpool for repairs.
Esmerelda	United Kingdom	The ship was driven ashore on the Kent coast. She was on a voyage from London to Hong Kong. She was refloated and put in to Dover, Kent in a leaky condition.
Melbourne	(United Kingdom of Great Britain and Ireland) Victoria	The steamship was wrecked at the mouth of the Murray River.
Princess Royal	United Kingdom	The schooner ran aground on The Platters. She was on a voyage from Grimsby, Lincolnshire to Limerick. She was refloated and put in the Harwich, Essex in a leaky condition.
Sydney Jones	United Kingdom	The ship collided with Swan (United Kingdom) off Kinsale, County Cork and was abandoned. Her crew were rescued by Swan. Sydney Jones was on a voyage from Portmadoc, Caernarfonshire to Limerick.

== 19 November ==
List of shipwrecks: 19 November 1859
Ship	State	Description
Ceres	United Kingdom	The brig ran aground on the Barber Sand, in the North Sea off the coast of Norfolk. She was refloated and resumed her voyage.
Charlotte	United Kingdom	The ship collided with the steamship Black Diamond (United Kingdom) was consequently beached at Sunderland, County Durham. She was on a voyage from Newcastle upon Tyne, Northumberland to Penzance, Cornwall.
Falken	Denmark	The yacht was driven ashore and wrecked on Skagen, Denmark. She was on a voyage from Bergen, Norway to Rostock.
Hermine	United Kingdom	The ship was sighted off Constantinople, Ottoman Empire whilst on a voyage from Odesa to a British port. No further trace, presumed foundered with the loss of all hands.
Hjalmair	Flag unknown	The ship was abandoned in the Atlantic Ocean. Her crew were rescued by Emerald (United Kingdom). Hjalmair was on a voyage from Quebec City, Province of Canada, British North America to London.
Ingeborg Caroline	Denmark	The schooner was driven ashore and wrecked on Lindholmsflaget. Her crew were rescued. She was on a voyage from Hartlepool, County Durham, United Kingdom.
John Bull	United Kingdom	The barque was wrecked at Saint=Jean-de-l'Île-d'Orléans, Province of Canada, British North America. She was on a voyage from Montreal, Province of Canada to London.
Lucy Holcombe	United States	The steamship sank near "Helen". She was on a voyage from Memphis, Tennessee to New Orleans, Louisiana.
Odin	Denmark	The ship was driven ashore Læsø. She was on a voyage from Karrebæksminde to London, United Kingdom.
Troy	United States	The ship ran aground on Sarn Badrig. She was refloated. She was on a voyage from New Orleans, Louisiana to Liverpool, Lancashire, United Kingdom.
William and Mary	United Kingdom	The ship was wrecked at "Media", Ottoman Empire with the loss of two of her crew.

== 20 November ==
List of shipwrecks: 20 November 1859
Ship	State	Description
Catherina	United Kingdom	The ship was wrecked near Methil, Fife. She was on a voyage from Stockholm, Sweden to Methil.
Hercules	Flag unknown	The ship foundered in the North Sea. She was on a voyage from Danzig to Grangemouth, Stirlingshire, United Kingdom.
Medway	United Kingdom	The ship was wrecked on Silver Cay, off Nassau, Bahamas. She was on a voyage from Nassau to London.
Peerless	(United Kingdom of Great Britain and Ireland) British North America	The ship, which had been dismasted on 4 November, was abandoned in the Atlantic Ocean. Her crew were rescued by Goliah (United Kingdom). Peerless was on a voyage from Saint John, New Brunswick to Queenstown, County Cork.
Sacha	Russia	The ship ran aground off Kronstadt. She was crushed by ice and sank on 23 November.
St. Christopher	Norway	The galiot ran aground on the Longsand, in the North Sea off the coast of Essex, United Kingdom. She was on a voyage from "Sweedistrand" to saint-Valery-sur-Somme, Somme, France. She was refloated and assisted in to Whitstable, Kent, United Kingdom.
William and Mary	United Kingdom	The sloop was driven ashore at Redcar, Yorkshire. She was on a voyage from Bridlington, East Riding of Yorkshire to Middlesbrough, Yorkshire. She was refloated and resumed her voyage.

== 21 November ==
List of shipwrecks: 21 November 1859
Ship	State	Description
Amelia	United Kingdom	The schooner ran ashore at Bridlington, Yorkshire and sank.
Grietina Hillechina	Netherlands	The galiot was wrecked on the Haaks Bank, in the North Sea off the Dutch coast. Her crew were rescued.
Indian	United Kingdom	The steamship was wrecked on the Seal Ledge, off Cape Race, Newfoundland, British North America with the loss of 27 of the 138 people on board. The schooner Alexander ( (United Kingdom of Great Britain and Ireland) British North America) rescued 24 people and the schooner Wave ( (United Kingdom of Great Britain and Ireland) British North America) rescued five. Indian was on a voyage from Liverpool, Lancashire to Portland, Maine, United States.
Margaretha Elizabeth	Netherlands	The galiot ran aground on the Longsand, in the North Sea off the coast of Essex, United Kingdom. She was on a voyage from South Shields, County Durham, United Kingdom to Barcelona Spain. She was refloated with the assistance of the smacks Pheasant, Prince of Orange and Scout (all United Kingdom) and assisted in to Harwich, Essex in a leaky condition by three .
Ohio	United Kingdom	The ship was driven ashore at Port St. Mary, Isle of Man. She was on a voyage from Liverpool to Stettin.
Philomene	Netherlands	The schooner ran aground on the Arklow Bank, in the Irish Sea off the coast of County Wicklow, United Kingdom. She was on a voyage from Liverpool to Antwerp, Belgium. She floated off but came ashore and was wrecked 3 nautical miles (5.6 km) south of Wicklow.

== 22 November ==
List of shipwrecks: 22 November 1859
Ship	State	Description
Christina	(United Kingdom of Great Britain and Ireland) New Zealand	The coasting schooner was wrecked in Palliser Bay.
David	United Kingdom	The sloop was driven ashore and severely damaged at Cardigan.
Integrity	United Kingdom	The barque was damaged by fire at North Shields, County Durham.
Rodolf	France	The barque ran aground in the Hooghly River. She was refloated.
Royal Sovereign	(United Kingdom of Great Britain and Ireland) Jersey	The ship was wrecked on the south coast of Sumatra, Netherlands East Indies. Her crew survived. She was on a voyage from Batavia, Netherlands East Indies to Queenstown, County Cork.

== 23 November ==
List of shipwrecks: 23 November 1859
Ship	State	Description
Canada	United Kingdom	The ship was wrecked on Pattersons's Rocks, off Sanda Island, in the Firth of Clyde. Her crew were rescued. She was on a voyage from Troon, Ayrshire to Matanzas, Cuba.
Delia	Russia	The galiot ran aground on the Goodwin Sands, Kent, United Kingdom. She was on a voyage from Liepāja to Tréguier, Côtes-du-Nord, France. She was refloated with the assistance of a lugger and taken in to Ramsgate, Kent.
Lisbon	United Kingdom	The barque was abandoned in the Atlantic Ocean. Her crew were rescued by Harlequin (United Kingdom). Lisbon was on a voyage from Saint John, New Brunswick, British North America to Hull, Yorkshire.
Sannicolo	Greece	The brig was wrecked at Constantinople, Ottoman Empire.
Windsbrandt	Stralsund	The brig was driven ashore on Skagen, Denmark. She was on a voyage from Sunderland, County Durham, United Kingdom to Swinemünde, Prussia. She was refloated on 1 December and assisted in to Fredrikshavn, Denmark in a severely leaky condition.

== 24 November ==
List of shipwrecks: 24 November 1859
Ship	State	Description
Amelia and Hannah	United Kingdom	The ship was driven ashore and wrecked at Millisle, County Down. She was refloated on 29 November and taken in to Donaghadee, County Down.
Asphalon	United Kingdom	The barque ran aground on the Longsand, in the North Sea off the coast of Essex. She was on a voyage from Sunderland, County Durham to Bordeaux, Gironde, France. She was refloated and assisted in to Harwich, Essex.
Birkenhead	United Kingdom	The ship was abandoned in the Atlantic Ocean. Her crew were rescued by Lusitano (France). Birkenhead was on a voyage from Quebec City, Province of Canada, British North America to Liverpool, Lancashire.
Blyth	United Kingdom	The brig ran aground on the Hammersgrund, in the Baltic Sea. She was on a voyage from Riga, Russia to Hull, Yorkshire.
Eugenie	Sweden	The schooner ran aground on the Shipwash Sand, in the North Sea off the coast of Suffolk, United Kingdom. She was on a voyage from Gothenburg to London, United Kingdom. She was refloated and assisted in to Harwich.
Golden Eagle	United Kingdom	The ship was wrecked on the Skerry, off Stroma, Caithness. Her crew were rescued. She was on a voyage from Riga, Russia to Belfast, County Antrim.
James McHenry	United Kingdom	The ship was abandoned in the Atlantic Ocean 200 nautical miles (370 km) east of Saint John's, Newfoundland, British North America. Her 40 crew were rescued; 33 by Minnesota, 7 by Seaflower (both United States). James McHenry was on a voyage from Quebec City to London.
Margaret and Ann	United Kingdom	The schooner was driven ashore and wrecked at Maughold Head, Isle of Man. Her crew were rescued. She was on a voyage from Ardrossan, Ayrshire to Morecambe, Lancashire.
Marie	Netherlands	The ship sank at Kronstadt, Russia.
HMS Undaunted	Royal Navy	The Lively-class frigate was expended as a target at Portchester, Hampshire.

== 25 November ==
List of shipwrecks: 25 November 1859
Ship	State	Description
Beavon	United Kingdom	The ship ran aground in the River Eske and was severely damaged. She was on a voyage from Galaţi, Ottoman Empire to "Mullinasloe".
Bristol	United Kingdom	The schooner foundered off the Kentish Knock. Her crew were rescued by the fishing lugger Thomas and Elizabeth (United Kingdom). Bristol was on a voyage from Sunderland, County Durham to Caen, Calvados, France.
Civility	United Kingdom	The ship collided with Sea Nymph (United Kingdom) in the North Sea. Five of her eight crew got aboard Sea Nymph. Civility was presumed to have foundered. She was on a voyage from Hartlepool, County Durham to Rotterdam, South Holland, Netherlands.
Columbus	United Kingdom	The ship was sighted 15 nautical miles (28 km) south of Flamborough Head, Yorkshire whilst on a voyage from Seaham, County Durham to London. No further trace, presumed foundered with the loss of all hands.
Grampian	United Kingdom	The ship ran aground off Holy Isle, in the Firth of Clyde. She was on a voyage from Greenock, Renfrewshire to São Paulo de Loanda, Portuguese West Africa. She was refloated and put back to Greenock in a leaky condition.
Gratitude	United Kingdom	The sloop was wrecked on the Haisborough Sands, in the North Sea off the coast of Norfolk. Her five crew were rescued.
Henry	United Kingdom	The ship was driven ashore and wrecked at Scarborough, Yorkshire. She was on a voyage from Hartlepool to Dover, Kent. She was refloated on 28 November and taken in to Scarborough.
St. Hilda	United Kingdom	The ship was wrecked on the Stoney Binks, in the North Sea off the mouth of the Humber. Her crew were rescued by the Spurn Lifeboat. She was on a voyage from Hartlepool to London.
Tre Emanuele Razeto	Malta	The ship departed from Malta for a British port. No further trace, presumed foundered with the loss of all hands.

== 26 November ==
List of shipwrecks: 26 November 1859
Ship	State	Description
Alert	United Kingdom	The schooner was driven ashore east of Warham, Norfolk. She was on a voyage from Blyth, Northumberland to Rouen, Seine-Inférieure, France. She was refloated on 28 November and taken in to Blakeney, Norfolk.
Alert	United Kingdom	The schooner foundered. Her crew were rescued the by schooner Bessie Jane (United Kingdom). Alert was on a voyage from Cardiff, Glamorgan to Gibraltar.
Cree	United Kingdom	The schooner collided with the barque Norval and sank off the Isle of Arran, Inner Hebrides. Her crew were rescued. She was on a voyage from Glasgow, Renfrewshire to Wigtown.
Ernest	France	The schooner was driven ashore at Wells-next-the-Sea, Norfolk. She was on a voyage from Christiania, Norway to Bordeaux, Gironde. She was refloated on 1 December and taken in to Wells-next-the-Sea.
Fortuna	Prussia	The brig was driven onto the East Scar Rocks, off the coast of County Durham, United KingdomUnited Kingdom. Her twelve crew were rescued by the Redcar Lifeboat. She was on a voyage from Memel to West Hartlepool, County Durham. She was refloated the next day and towed in to West Hartlepool in a waterlogged condition.
Galway	United Kingdom	The sloop was driven ashore and wrecked at Dungarvan, County Waterford. She was on a voyage from Youghal, County Cork to Dublin.
Globe	United States	The barque was driven ashore on Dutch Island, Rhode Island. She was on a voyage from South Shields, County Durham to Richmond, Virginia. She was later refloated and towed in to Providence, Rhode Island.
Henry	United Kingdom	The ship was driven ashore and severely damaged at Scarborough, Yorkshire. She was on a voyage from Hartlepool, County Durham to Dover, Kent.
Nadescha	United Kingdom	The ship was wrecked on "Abdul Koori Island" with the loss of three of her crew. She was on a voyage from Sunderland, County Durham to Suez, Egypt.
Tre Emanuele	Malta	The ship departed from Malta for a British port. No further trace, presumed foundered with the loss of all hands.
Tyne	United Kingdom	The ship was driven ashore in Lough Swilly. She was on a voyage from Ballyshannon, County Antrim to Troon, Ayrshire. She was refloated the next day and taken in to Rathmullen, County Donegal in a leaky condition.

== 27 November ==
List of shipwrecks: 27 November 1859
Ship	State	Description
Cree	United Kingdom	The schooner collided with Norval (United Kingdom) and sank off the Isle of Arran, Inner Hebrides. Her crew were rescued. She was on a voyage from Glasgow, Renfrewshire to Wigtown.
Jessie	United Kingdom	The ship was driven ashore near Aarhus, Denmark. She was on a voyage from Memel, Prussia to Leith, Lothian.
Jenny Lind	United Kingdom	The barque collided with a brig in the Atlantic Ocean. She was consequently abandoned on 30 November. Her crew were rescued by Nora Creina (United Kingdom). Jenny Lind was on a voyage from Quebec City, Province of Canada, British North America to Waterford.
Lord Strangford	(United Kingdom of Great Britain and Ireland) Jersey	The schooner ran aground on the Holm Sand, in the North Sea off the coast of Suffolk. She was on a voyage from South Shields, County Durham to Saint-Malo, Ille-et-Vilaine, France. She was refloated.
Martha	United Kingdom	The brig collided with the steamship Unanimity (United Kingdom) and was abandoned in the English Channel off Beachy Head, Sussex. Her crew were rescued by Unanimity. Martha was on a voyage from Portsmouth, Hampshire to Sunderland, County Durham. She was subsequently taken in to Dieppe, Seine-Inférieure, France in a severely damaged condition.

== 28 November ==
List of shipwrecks: 28 November 1859
Ship	State	Description
August	Grand Duchy of Mecklenburg-Schwerin	The brig collided with another vessel and sank in the Skaggerak. Her crew were rescued.
Eagle	United Kingdom	The steamship collided with Pladda (United Kingdom) and sank off Lamlash, Isle of Arran, Inner Hebrides with the loss of eleven of the 45 people on board. She was on a voyage from Glasgow, Renfrewshire to Londondery.
Harmony	United Kingdom	The schooner foundered in the North Sea off the Dudgeon Sandbank. Her four crew took to a boat, and were subsequently rescued by the schooner Joseph ( (United Kingdom of Great Britain and Ireland) Guernsey). Harmony was on a voyage from South Shields, County Durham to Beer, Devon.
Mary Ann	United Kingdom	The ship was driven ashore in the Wainoa River. She was on a voyage from Auckland to Kiapara, New Zealand.
Nouvelle Société	France	The ship was driven ashore on the Île d'Oléron, Charente-Inférieure. She was reported to be on a voyage from Seaham, County Durham to Havre de Grâce, Seine-Inférieure.
Perekop	United Kingdom	The ship ran aground at Kurrachee, India. She was on a voyage from Kurrachee to Bombay. She was refloated and resumed her voyage, arriving on 27 December in a leaky condition.
Rusko Castle	United Kingdom	The ship was driven ashore at Morecambe, Lancashire and broke her back. She was on a voyage from Ardrossan, Ayrshire to Morecambe. She was refloated on 30 November and taken in to Morecambe in a waterlogged condition.
Sisters	United Kingdom	The ship was driven ashore 1 nautical mile (1.9 km) south of Morecambe. She was on a voyage from Bowling, Dunbartonshire to Morecambe.
Solid	Sweden	The brig capsized in the North Sea off Heligoland with the loss of all hands. She was on a voyage from Cuxhaven to Newry, County Antrim, United Kingdom.

== 29 November ==
List of shipwrecks: 29 November 1859
Ship	State	Description
Amanda	United Kingdom	The brig was wrecked on the Corton Sand, in the North Sea off the coast of Suffolk. Her crew were rescued. She was on a voyage from Sunderland, County Durham to Rochester, Kent.
Amphitrite	Belgium	The brig was driven ashore at Ostend, West Flanders. She was on a voyage from Hyères, Var, France to Ostend.
Eliza Stewart	United Kingdom	The ship was driven ashore at Korsør, Denmark. She was on a voyage from King's Lynn, Norfolk to Horsens, Denmark.
Favourite	United Kingdom	The brig collided with another vessel and was abandoned in the North SeAn 8 nautical miles (15 km) off Spurn Point, Yorkshire. Her crew were rescued by the steamship Helen McGregor (United Kingdom).
Genova	Kingdom of Sardinia	The steamship caught fire and sank at Málaga, Spain. All on board were rescued.
Gretje Bos	Flag unknown	The koff foundered off Hamra, Gotland, Sweden. She was on a voyage from Riga, Russia to Dunkirk, Nord, France.
Harmony	United Kingdom	The schooner foundered in the North Sea off Happisburgh, Norfolk. Her crew were rescued. She was on a voyage from South Shields, County Durham to Exeter, Devon.
Hercules	Duchy of Holstein	The ship foundered in the North Sea. Her crew were rescued by Tjetska (Sweden). Hercules was on a voyage from Danzig to Grangemouth, Stirlingshire, United Kingdom.
Hendrika Geertruida	Netherlands	The ship was wrecked on Schiermonnikoog, Groningen with the loss of a crew member. She was on a voyage from Newcastle upon Tyne, Northumberland, United Kingdom to the city of Groningen.
Joblins	United Kingdom	The ship ran aground at North Shields, County Durham. She was on a voyage from North Shields to London. She was refloated and put back to North Shields in a leaky condition.
Lady Franklin	United Kingdom	The ship collided with Kelvin (United Kingdom) and sank in the Atlantic Ocean with the loss of eighteen of the nineteen people on board. The survivor was rescued by the steamship Marley Hill (United Kingdom). Lady Franklin was on a voyage from Liverpool to Maranhão, Brazil.

== 30 November ==
List of shipwrecks: 30 November 1859
Ship	State	Description
Alice	United Kingdom	The ship foundered off Trevose Head, Devon. Her crew were rescued. She was on a voyage from Llanelly, Glamorgan to Dieppe, Seine-Inférieure, France.
Edward and Isabella	United Kingdom	The ship was wrecked on the Haisborough Sands, in the North Sea off the coast of Norfolk. Her crew were rescued by the sailing barge Henry Evans (United Kingdom). Edward and Isabella was on a voyage from Sunderland, County Durham to Le Tréport, Seine-Inférieure, France.
Providence	United Kingdom	The fishing trawler was driven ashore and wrecked at Dartmouth, Devon.
Surprise	United Kingdom	The schooner capsized at Staldon, Devon.
Syren	United Kingdom	The schooner was driven ashore at Vauville, Calvados, France. She was on a voyage from Seville, Spain to London.
Timandra	United Kingdom	The ship was wrecked off the coast of Norfolk. Her crew were rescued.
Velocity	United Kingdom	The schooner ran aground on the Haisborough Sands. She was on a voyage from Caernarfon to Newcastle upon Tyne, Northumberland. She was refloated and taken in to Great Yarmouth, Norfolk in a sinking condition.
Wave	United Kingdom	The ship ran aground on the West Hoyle Sandbank, in Liverpool Bay and sank. She was on a voyage from Renfrew to the River Dee.

== Unknown date ==
List of shipwrecks: Unknown date in November 1859
Ship	State	Description
Adrian	United Kingdom	The ship was wrecked before 29 November. She was on a voyage from Savanilla, Granadine Confederation to London.
Agusta	United Kingdom	The barque was driven ashore at "St. Michael". She was on a voyage from Quebec City, Province of Canada, British North America to Stockton-on-Tees, County Durham. She was refloated and put back to Quebec City.
America	United Kingdom	The ship was driven ashore at "Pont Neuf". She was on a voyage from Liverpool, Lancashire to Quebec City, Province of Canada, British North America. She was refloated and completed her voyage.
Army	United Kingdom	The brig foundered in the Bristol Channel. She was on a voyage from Barcelona, Spain to Swansea, Glamorgan.
Athenia	Flag unknown	The ship was wrecked at Trieste.
Azov	United Kingdom	The ship foundered in the Irish Sea off the coast of County Wexford. She was on a voyage from Gibraltar to Swansea.
Bank	United Kingdom	The ship was driven ashore at Maryport, Cumberland before 27 November, when she broke up.
Bogartio	Flag unknown	The ship was wrecked at Trieste.
Caledonia	United Kingdom	The steamship suffered a boiler explosion before 11 November and was beached in the Haro Archipelago, Colony of British Columbia.
Camerino	Flag unknown	The ship was wrecked at Trieste.
Christiania	Norway	The ship foundered in the Atlantic Ocean. Her crew were rescued by Advice (United Kingdom).
Cockatrice	United Kingdom	The ship was wrecked on the Chinese coast before 14 November. she was on a voyage from Foo Chow Foo, China to Hong Kong.
Duke	United Kingdom	The barque ran aground on Long Cay before 6 November. She was on a voyage from St. Jago, Jamaica to Swansea.
Eclipse	United Kingdom	The ship foundered in the Black Sea after 13 November. She was on a voyage from Odesa to a British port.
Egida	Austrian Empire	The barque foundered in the Adriatic Sea. Her crew were rescued by the steamship Adria ( Austrian Empire). She was on a voyage from Odesa to a British port.
Eliza Morrison	United Kingdom	The ship was abandoned off Cape Clear Island, County Cork. She was on a voyage from Quebec City to Liverpool.
Ellen	United Kingdom	The brig was abandoned in the Atlantic Ocean.
Einighert	Prussia	The ship was driven ashore at Memel. She was on a voyage from Memel to Fleetwood, Lancashire.
Fortuna	United Kingdom	The ship was driven ashore in the Orkney Islands before 6 November. She was on a voyage from Arundel, Sussex to the Isle of Man.
Galatea	United Kingdom	The ship was holed by ice in the Traverse. She was on a voyage from Quebec City to Exmouth, Devon. She put back to Quebec City on 18 November in a waterlogged condition.
Grigas	Flag unknown	The ship was wrecked at Trieste.
Grostantina	Flag unknown	The ship was wrecked at Trieste.
Homer	United Kingdom	The brig was wrecked on Terschelling, Friesland, Netherlands. Her crew were rescued.
Hyacinthe	France	The brig foundered in the Strait of Gibraltar. She was on a voyage from Cette, Hérault to New York, United States.
Iron Age	United Kingdom	The ship sank off the Cow and Calf Rocks. She was on a voyage from Newcastle upon Tyne, Northumberland to Dublin.
James and Eleanore	United Kingdom	The ship was driven ashore at Karlskrona, Sweden. She was on a voyage from Kronstadt, Russia to Christiansø, Denmark. She was refloated and taken in to Copenhagen, Denmark, where she arrived on 15 November in a leaky condition.
John and Lucy	United Kingdom	The ship was wrecked at Cape St. Rocque, Brazil. All on board, more than 400 people, survived. She was on a voyage from Liverpool to the Cape of Good Hope, Cape Colony.
Juliet Trundy	United Kingdom	The ship was driven ashore at Cape Florida. She was on a voyage from New Orleans, Louisiana, United States to Liverpool.
Karen Marthea	Sweden	The ship was driven ashore on the French coast. She was on a voyage from Härnösand to Santander, Spain. She was refloated and put in to Falmouth, Cornwall, United Kingdom, where she arrived on 6 November in a leaky condition.
Lord Palmerston	United Kingdom	The ship ran aground on the Falsterbo Reef, off the coast of Sweden. She was on a voyage from Sundsvall, Sweden to Australia. She was refloated and put in to Copenhagen, Denmark, where she arrived on 5 November in a leaky condition.
Lynx	United Kingdom	The schooner was abandoned in a sinking condition before 4 November. Her crew were rescued. She was on a voyage from Huelva, Spain to Newcastle upon Tyne, Northumberland.
Magnus	Sweden	The brig was driven ashore at Dungeness, Kent, United Kingdom. She was on a voyage from Umeå to Marseille. She was refloated and put in to Cowes, Isle of Wight, United Kingdom, where she arrived on 17 November.
Marie et Adele	France	The schooner sprang a leak and sank off Vigo, Spain before 5 November. Her crew were rescued.
Marina	United Kingdom	The waterlogged barque was discovered in early November by the shipwrecked crew of Sapphire (United Kingdom). The boarded her, and took her in to Port Curtis, Queensland, where she arrived on 17 February 1860.
Martha	United Kingdom	The ship was wrecked at Genoa, Kingdom of Sardinia.
Mayflower	United States	The ship was wrecked on the Cordovan Rocks. Her crew survived. She was on a voyage from Norfolk, Virginia to Bordeaux, Gironde, France.
Messenger	France	The brig was wrecked near Limassol, Cyprus. She was on a voyage from Cyprus to Genoa, Kingdom of Sardinia.
Miller	United Kingdom	The brig was wrecked on the coast of Newfoundland, British North America with the loss of all but two of her crew. She was on a voyage from Hartlepool to Quebec City.
Mountaineer	United Kingdom	The ship caught fire at Quebec City and was scuttled.
Neo	Flag unknown	The ship was wrecked at Trieste.
Nicolo	Flag unknown	The ship was wrecked at Trieste.
N. Larrabee	United States	The full-rigged ship ran aground on the Matinilla Reef. She was on a voyage from New Orleans to Liverpool. She was refloated and taken in to Tybee Island, Georgia in a waterlogged condition.
Ohio	Stettin	The ship was driven ashore and wrecked at Port St. Mary, Isle of Man. Four crew were rescued by the Castletown Lifeboat. She was on a voyage from Liverpool to Stettin.
Raven	United Kingdom	The ship was driven ashore and wrecked at Dunwich, Suffolk.
Richard Carnall	United Kingdom	The ship ran aground on the Haisborough Sands, in the North Sea off the coast of Norfolk. Her crew were rescued by the steamship Trinity (United Kingdom). Richard Carnall was on a voyage from Liverpool to Great Yarmouth, Norfolk.
Sapphire	United Kingdom	The full-rigged ship was wrecked at sea in early November. Her crew survived.
Sorte	Ottoman Empire	The schooner was driven ashore and wrecked at Mġarr, Gozo, Malta between 13 and 15 November.
Stanko S. Pauletich	Austrian Empire	The brig was wrecked at "Media", Ottoman Empire . She was on a voyage from Odesa to Antwerp, Belgium.
Tres Irmanos	Portugal	The ship was wrecked near Santos, Brazil before 7 November. Her crew were rescued. She was on a voyage from Lisbon to Santos.
Victoria	United Kingdom	The brig was abandoned in the North Sea. She was towed in to Scarborough, Yorkshire by the smack Miss Eva (United Kingdom).
Wolf	United Kingdom	The steamship was driven ashore and wrecked on Læsø, Denmark. She was on a voyage from Landskrona, Sweden to London.
