= Dorsum =

Dorsum (plural Dorsa) is a Latin word. In science, it may refer to:

== Anatomy ==
- Dorsum (anatomy), the upper side of an animal, or the back in erect organisms
  - Dorsum humanum, the human back
- Dorsum of foot, the top of the foot
- Dorsum of hand (also called the opisthenar), the back of the hand
- The back of the tongue, which is used for articulating dorsal consonants

== Other uses ==
- Dorsum (moth), genus of moths of the family Erebidae
- Dorsum (astrogeology), wrinkle ridges found on planets or moons
- Theta Capricorni, a star on the back of Capricornus
