= Bruma (surname) =

Bruma is a surname. Notable people with the surname include:

- Eddy Bruma (1925–2000), Surinamese politician, lawyer and writer
- Jeffrey Bruma (born 1991), Dutch football defender, brother of Marciano
- Marciano Bruma (born 1984), Dutch football defender, brother of Jeffrey

== See also ==
- Bruma (disambiguation)
