= Obscura =

Obscura may refer to:

== Arts, entertainment, and media ==
- Obscura (album), the third album by Gorguts
- Obscura (band), a German death metal band
- "Obscura" (Smallville episode) from season 1
- Obscura Antiques & Oddities, the antique store in the TV show Oddities
- Obscura engravings and paintings, elements in the video game Tomb Raider: The Angel of Darkness

== Biology ==
- Obscura (moth), a synonym of the moth genus Obscurior

== Other uses ==
- ObscurA, an online crypt hunt organised by NIT Kurukshetra
- Obscura Digital, a creative technology company

== See also ==
- Camera obscura
- Obscuranella
- Obscurantism
- Obscurior
