= Dorsum teraii =

Scientific classification
- Domain: Eukaryota
- Kingdom: Animalia
- Phylum: Arthropoda
- Class: Insecta
- Order: Lepidoptera
- Superfamily: Noctuoidea
- Family: Erebidae
- Genus: Dorsum
- Species: D. teraii

Binomial name
- Dorsum teraii Fibiger, 2011

Species of moth

Dorsum teraii is a moth of the family Erebidae first described by Michael Fibiger in 2011. It is found in southern Nepal (it was described from Tarai).

The wingspan is about 13 mm.
