= Tactusa flexus =

Scientific classification
- Kingdom: Animalia
- Phylum: Arthropoda
- Class: Insecta
- Order: Lepidoptera
- Superfamily: Noctuoidea
- Family: Erebidae
- Genus: Tactusa
- Species: T. flexus

Binomial name
- Tactusa flexus Fibiger, 2011

Species of moth

Tactusa flexus is a moth of the family Erebidae first described by Michael Fibiger in 2011. It is known from China's Yunnan province.

The wingspan is about 11.5 mm. The forewings are narrow. The head, patagia and base of the costa are black and the ground colour of the forewings is light beige with a black costal-medial patch and with a black subterminal and terminal area, including the fringe. The crosslines are absent, except for the relatively broad white-beige subterminal line and a terminal line marked by black interveinal dots. The reniform stigma is almost invisible and beige, outlined by a few brown scales. The hindwings are unicolorous grey, with a discal spot. The fringe is grey. The ventral surface is light brown.

The biotope consists of moist, mainly broad-leaf forest with shrubs and herbaceous plants, close to a river. All specimens were collected at light in mid-September.
