= Conspica parainconspicua =

Scientific classification
- Domain: Eukaryota
- Kingdom: Animalia
- Phylum: Arthropoda
- Class: Insecta
- Order: Lepidoptera
- Superfamily: Noctuoidea
- Family: Erebidae
- Genus: Conspica
- Species: C. parainconspicua

Binomial name
- Conspica parainconspicua Fibiger, 2010

Species of moth

Conspica parainconspicua is a moth of the family Erebidae first described by Michael Fibiger in 2010. It is known from northern Thailand.

The wingspan is about 9 mm.
