= Longiantrum quadra =

Scientific classification
- Kingdom: Animalia
- Phylum: Arthropoda
- Clade: Pancrustacea
- Class: Insecta
- Order: Lepidoptera
- Superfamily: Noctuoidea
- Family: Erebidae
- Genus: Longiantrum
- Species: L. quadra

Binomial name
- Longiantrum quadra Fibiger, 2010

Species of moth

Longiantrum quadra is a moth of the family Erebidae first described by Michael Fibiger in 2010. It is endemic to northern Vietnam.

Its wingspan is roughly 10 mm.
