= Editum =

Scientific classification
- Domain: Eukaryota
- Kingdom: Animalia
- Phylum: Arthropoda
- Class: Insecta
- Order: Lepidoptera
- Superfamily: Noctuoidea
- Family: Erebidae
- Subfamily: Hypenodinae
- Tribe: Micronoctuini
- Subtribe: Tactusina
- Genus: Editum; Fibiger, 2010

Genus of moths

Editum is a genus of moths of the family Erebidae erected by Michael Fibiger in 2010.

== Species ==
- Editum editoides Fibiger, 2010
- Editum editum Fibiger, 2010
