= Tactusa assamiensis =

Scientific classification
- Domain: Eukaryota
- Kingdom: Animalia
- Phylum: Arthropoda
- Class: Insecta
- Order: Lepidoptera
- Superfamily: Noctuoidea
- Family: Erebidae
- Genus: Tactusa
- Species: T. assamiensis

Binomial name
- Tactusa assamiensis Fibiger, 2010

Synonyms
- Tactusa assamia

Species of moth

Tactusa assamiensis is a moth of the family Erebidae first described by Michael Fibiger in 2010. It is known from Assam in India.

The wingspan is about 11.5 mm.
