= Asyprocessa =

Scientific classification
- Domain: Eukaryota
- Kingdom: Animalia
- Phylum: Arthropoda
- Class: Insecta
- Order: Lepidoptera
- Superfamily: Noctuoidea
- Family: Erebidae
- Subtribe: Tactusina
- Genus: Asyprocessa; Fibiger, 2010

Genus of moths

Asyprocessa is a genus of moths of the family Erebidae first described by Michael Fibiger in 2010.

== Species ==
- Asyprocessa wapi Fibiger, 2010
- Asyprocessa laevi Fibiger, 2010
- Asyprocessa spinus Fibiger, 2010
