= Paradoxica parki =

Scientific classification
- Domain: Eukaryota
- Kingdom: Animalia
- Phylum: Arthropoda
- Class: Insecta
- Order: Lepidoptera
- Superfamily: Noctuoidea
- Family: Erebidae
- Genus: Paradoxica
- Species: P. parki

Binomial name
- Paradoxica parki Fibiger, 2011

Species of moth

Paradoxica parki is a moth of the family Erebidae first described by Michael Fibiger in 2011. It is found in central Thailand.

The wingspan is about 10 mm for males and 11 mm for females.
