= Bruma =

Bruma may refer to:

== People ==
- Bruma (footballer) (born 1994), Portuguese football winger
- Jeffrey Bruma (born 1991), Dutch football defender, brother of Marciano
- Marciano Bruma (born 1984), Dutch football defender, brother of Jeffrey
- Eddy Bruma (1925–2000), Surinamese politician, lawyer and writer

== Other uses ==
- Bruma, the Latin name for the day of the winter solstice, which ended the Brumalia festival
- Bruma (moth), a genus of moths in the family Erebidae
- Bruma, Gauteng, a suburb of Johannesburg, South Africa
- Bruma, a fictional city within The Elder Scrolls universe
- Bruma (or BrUMa, short for BRonx Upper MAnhattan), an area of parallel uptown neighborhoods of New York City combining the Bronx and Upper Manhattan

== See also ==
- Burma (disambiguation)
