= Tactusa schnacki =

Scientific classification
- Domain: Eukaryota
- Kingdom: Animalia
- Phylum: Arthropoda
- Class: Insecta
- Order: Lepidoptera
- Superfamily: Noctuoidea
- Family: Erebidae
- Genus: Tactusa
- Species: T. schnacki

Binomial name
- Tactusa schnacki Fibiger, 2010

Species of moth

Tactusa schnacki is a moth of the family Erebidae first described by Michael Fibiger in 2010. It is known from Assam in north-eastern India.

The wingspan is about 12 mm.
