= Tactusa =

Scientific classification
- Kingdom: Animalia
- Phylum: Arthropoda
- Class: Insecta
- Order: Lepidoptera
- Superfamily: Noctuoidea
- Family: Erebidae
- Subtribe: Tactusina
- Genus: Tactusa; Fibiger, 2010

Genus of moths

Tactusa is a genus of moths of the family Erebidae. The genus was erected by Michael Fibiger in 2010.

== Species ==
- The sumatrensis species group
  - Tactusa major Fibiger, 2010
  - Tactusa rima Fibiger, 2010
  - Tactusa sine Fibiger, 2010
  - Tactusa sumatrensis Fibiger, 2010
  - Tactusa parasumatrensis Fibiger, 2010
- The trigonifera species group
  - Tactusa schnacki Fibiger, 2010
  - Tactusa trigonifera (Hampson, 1898)
  - Tactusa nilssoni Fibiger, 2010
  - Tactusa ostium Fibiger, 2010
  - Tactusa peregovitsi Fibiger, 2010
  - Tactusa flavoniger Fibiger, 2010
- The nieukerkeni species group
  - Tactusa nieukerkeni Fibiger, 2010
  - Tactusa topi Fibiger, 2010
  - Tactusa incognita Fibiger, 2010
  - Tactusa tranumi Fibiger, 2010
  - Tactusa bechi Fibiger, 2010
  - Tactusa dohertyi Fibiger, 2010
- The artus species group
  - Tactusa minor Fibiger, 2010
  - Tactusa jeppeseni Fibiger, 2010
  - Tactusa artus Fibiger, 2010
  - Tactusa biartus Fibiger, 2010
  - Tactusa similis Fibiger, 2010
  - Tactusa constrictor Fibiger, 2010
  - Tactusa assamiensis Fibiger, 2010
  - Tactusa discrepans Fibiger, 2010
  - Tactusa spadix Fibiger, 2010
  - Tactusa pars Fibiger, 2010
  - Tactusa flexus Fibiger, 2011
- The virga species group
  - Tactusa virga Fibiger, 2011
- The brevis species group
  - Tactusa brevis Fibiger, 2011
