= Longiantrum coclea =

Scientific classification
- Domain: Eukaryota
- Kingdom: Animalia
- Phylum: Arthropoda
- Class: Insecta
- Order: Lepidoptera
- Superfamily: Noctuoidea
- Family: Erebidae
- Genus: Longiantrum
- Species: L. coclea

Binomial name
- Longiantrum coclea Fibiger, 2010

Species of moth

Longiantrum coclea is a moth of the family Erebidae first described by Michael Fibiger in 2010. It is known from northern Vietnam.

The wingspan is about 11 mm.
