= Abes =

Scientific classification
- Kingdom: Animalia
- Phylum: Arthropoda
- Class: Insecta
- Order: Lepidoptera
- Superfamily: Noctuoidea
- Family: Erebidae
- Subfamily: Hypenodinae
- Tribe: Micronoctuini
- Subtribe: Tactusina
- Genus: Abes; Fibiger, 2010
- Species: A. vedi

Binomial name
- Abes vedi Fibiger, 2010

Genus of moths

Abes is a monotypic moth genus of the family Erebidae. Its only species, Abes vedi is known from north-western Thailand. Both the genus and the species were first described by Michael Fibiger in 2010.

The wingspan is about 10 mm.
