= Tactusa brevis =

Scientific classification
- Domain: Eukaryota
- Kingdom: Animalia
- Phylum: Arthropoda
- Class: Insecta
- Order: Lepidoptera
- Superfamily: Noctuoidea
- Family: Erebidae
- Genus: Tactusa
- Species: T. brevis

Binomial name
- Tactusa brevis Fibiger, 2011

Species of moth

Tactusa brevis is a moth of the family Erebidae first described by Michael Fibiger in 2011. It is known from the Chinese provinces of Yunnan and Guizhou.

The wingspan is 11–12 mm. The forewings are narrow. The head, patagia and base of the costa are black and the ground colour of the forewings is brown, with a dark brown costal-medial patch, and with a dark brown subterminal and terminal area, including fringes. The crosslines are black and the subterminal line is broad and the terminal line is marked by black interveinial dots. The reniform stigma is beige yellow, outlined by black. The hindwings are unicolorous grey, with a discal spot. The fringes are grey. The ventral surface is unicolorous light brown.

The biotope consists of a moist, mainly broad-leaf forest, with bushes and herbaceous plants, close to a river. The Mojiang collecting site is a large ravine with a brook. All specimens were collected at light in mid-September.
