= Burmah =

Burmah may refer to:

- Burma (Myanmar), a Southeast Asian country
- Burmah Oil Company
- Burmah, a ship which disappeared en route from London to New Zealand in 1859/60.
