= Asyprocessa laevi =

Scientific classification
- Domain: Eukaryota
- Kingdom: Animalia
- Phylum: Arthropoda
- Class: Insecta
- Order: Lepidoptera
- Superfamily: Noctuoidea
- Family: Erebidae
- Genus: Asyprocessa
- Species: A. laevi

Binomial name
- Asyprocessa laevi Fibiger, 2010

Species of moth

Asyprocessa laevi is a moth of the family Erebidae first described by Michael Fibiger in 2010. It is known from northern and north-western Thailand.

The wingspan is about 8 mm.
