= Dextella =

Scientific classification
- Domain: Eukaryota
- Kingdom: Animalia
- Phylum: Arthropoda
- Class: Insecta
- Order: Lepidoptera
- Superfamily: Noctuoidea
- Family: Erebidae
- Subtribe: Tactusina
- Genus: Dextella; Fibiger, 2011

Genus of moths

Dextella is a genus of moths of the family Erebidae erected by Michael Fibiger in 2011.

== Species ==
- Dextella alleni Fibiger, 2011
- Dextella khaoyaiana Fibiger, 2011
- Dextella flavus Fibiger, 2011
