= Dorsum bengali =

Scientific classification
- Domain: Eukaryota
- Kingdom: Animalia
- Phylum: Arthropoda
- Class: Insecta
- Order: Lepidoptera
- Superfamily: Noctuoidea
- Family: Erebidae
- Genus: Dorsum
- Species: D. bengali

Binomial name
- Dorsum bengali Fibiger, 2011

Species of moth

Dorsum bengali is a moth of the family Erebidae first described by Michael Fibiger in 2011. It is found in India (it was described from Kolkata in West Bengal).

The wingspan is about 11 mm.
