= Tactusa minor =

Scientific classification
- Domain: Eukaryota
- Kingdom: Animalia
- Phylum: Arthropoda
- Class: Insecta
- Order: Lepidoptera
- Superfamily: Noctuoidea
- Family: Erebidae
- Genus: Tactusa
- Species: T. minor

Binomial name
- Tactusa minor Fibiger, 2010

Species of moth

Tactusa minor is a moth of the family Erebidae, described in northern Thailand by Michael Fibiger in 2010.

The wingspan is about 11 mm.
