= Obscurior fragilis =

Scientific classification
- Domain: Eukaryota
- Kingdom: Animalia
- Phylum: Arthropoda
- Class: Insecta
- Order: Lepidoptera
- Superfamily: Noctuoidea
- Family: Erebidae
- Genus: Obscurior
- Species: O. fragilis

Binomial name
- Obscurior fragilis (Fibiger, 2010)

Synonyms
- Obscura fragilis Fibiger, 2010

Species of moth

Obscurior fragilis is a moth of the family Erebidae, described in northwestern Thailand by Michael Fibiger in 2010.

The wingspan is about 10 mm.
