= Asyprocessa spinus =

Scientific classification
- Domain: Eukaryota
- Kingdom: Animalia
- Phylum: Arthropoda
- Class: Insecta
- Order: Lepidoptera
- Superfamily: Noctuoidea
- Family: Erebidae
- Genus: Asyprocessa
- Species: A. spinus

Binomial name
- Asyprocessa spinus Fibiger, 2010

Species of moth

Asyprocessa spinus is a moth of the family Erebidae first described by Michael Fibiger in 2010. It is known from western and north-western Thailand.

The wingspan is 8–10 mm.
