= Tactusa trigonifera =

Scientific classification
- Domain: Eukaryota
- Kingdom: Animalia
- Phylum: Arthropoda
- Class: Insecta
- Order: Lepidoptera
- Superfamily: Noctuoidea
- Family: Erebidae
- Genus: Tactusa
- Species: T. trigonifera

Binomial name
- Tactusa trigonifera (Hampson, 1898)

Synonyms
- Tolpia trigonifera Hampson, 1898

Species of moth

Tactusa trigonifera is a moth of the family Erebidae first described by George Hampson in 1898. It is known from Assam in north-eastern India.

The wingspan is about 12 mm.
