= Dorsum kwaii =

Scientific classification
- Domain: Eukaryota
- Kingdom: Animalia
- Phylum: Arthropoda
- Class: Insecta
- Order: Lepidoptera
- Superfamily: Noctuoidea
- Family: Erebidae
- Genus: Dorsum
- Species: D. kwaii

Binomial name
- Dorsum kwaii Fibiger, 2011

Species of moth

Dorsum kwaii is a moth of the family Erebidae first described by Michael Fibiger in 2011. It is found in northern, central western and central Thailand and southern Laos.

The wingspan is 10–12 mm.
