= Editum editum =

Scientific classification
- Domain: Eukaryota
- Kingdom: Animalia
- Phylum: Arthropoda
- Class: Insecta
- Order: Lepidoptera
- Superfamily: Noctuoidea
- Family: Erebidae
- Genus: Editum
- Species: E. editum

Binomial name
- Editum editum Fibiger, 2010

Species of moth

Editum editum is a moth of the family Erebidae first described by Michael Fibiger in 2010. It is known from Vietnam.

The wingspan is about 10 mm.
