= Paradoxica asymmetrica =

Scientific classification
- Domain: Eukaryota
- Kingdom: Animalia
- Phylum: Arthropoda
- Class: Insecta
- Order: Lepidoptera
- Superfamily: Noctuoidea
- Family: Erebidae
- Genus: Paradoxica
- Species: P. asymmetrica

Binomial name
- Paradoxica asymmetrica Fibiger, 2011

Species of moth

Paradoxica asymmetrica is a moth of the [family Erebidae first described by Michael Fibiger in 2011. It is found on Hainan Island in China.

The wingspan is about 11 mm.
