= Obscurior davisi =

Scientific classification
- Domain: Eukaryota
- Kingdom: Animalia
- Phylum: Arthropoda
- Class: Insecta
- Order: Lepidoptera
- Superfamily: Noctuoidea
- Family: Erebidae
- Genus: Obscurior
- Species: O. davisi

Binomial name
- Obscurior davisi (Fibiger, 2010)

Synonyms
- Obscura davisi Fibiger, 2010

Species of moth

Obscurior davisi is a moth of the family Erebidae first described by Michael Fibiger in 2010. It is known from Sri Lanka.

The wingspan is 7–9 mm.
