= Asyprocessa wapi =

Scientific classification
- Domain: Eukaryota
- Kingdom: Animalia
- Phylum: Arthropoda
- Class: Insecta
- Order: Lepidoptera
- Superfamily: Noctuoidea
- Family: Erebidae
- Genus: Asyprocessa
- Species: A. wapi

Binomial name
- Asyprocessa wapi Fibiger, 2010

Species of moth

Asyprocessa wapi is a moth of the family Erebidae first described by Michael Fibiger in 2010. It is known from southern Laos, in Southeast Asia.

== Description ==
The wingspan of Asyprocessa wapi is about 9 mm.
