= Obscurior clarus =

Scientific classification
- Domain: Eukaryota
- Kingdom: Animalia
- Phylum: Arthropoda
- Class: Insecta
- Order: Lepidoptera
- Superfamily: Noctuoidea
- Family: Erebidae
- Genus: Obscurior
- Species: O. clarus

Binomial name
- Obscurior clarus (Fibiger, 2010)

Synonyms
- Obscura clarus Fibiger, 2010

Species of moth

Obscurior clarus is a moth of the family Erebidae first described by Michael Fibiger in 2010. It is known from West Sumatra in Indonesia.

The wingspan is about 9.5 mm.
