= Dextella khaoyaiana =

Scientific classification
- Domain: Eukaryota
- Kingdom: Animalia
- Phylum: Arthropoda
- Class: Insecta
- Order: Lepidoptera
- Superfamily: Noctuoidea
- Family: Erebidae
- Genus: Dextella
- Species: D. khaoyaiana

Binomial name
- Dextella khaoyaiana Fibiger, 2011

Species of moth

Dextella khaoyaiana is a moth of the family Erebidae first described by Michael Fibiger in 2011. It is found in central Thailand.

The wingspan is about 11.5 mm.
