= Tactusa pars =

Scientific classification
- Domain: Eukaryota
- Kingdom: Animalia
- Phylum: Arthropoda
- Class: Insecta
- Order: Lepidoptera
- Superfamily: Noctuoidea
- Family: Erebidae
- Genus: Tactusa
- Species: T. pars

Binomial name
- Tactusa pars Fibiger, 2010

Species of moth

Tactusa pars is a moth of the family Erebidae first described by Michael Fibiger in 2010. It is known from western Thailand, western Malaysia and the Chinese provinces of Yunnan and Guizhou.

The wingspan is 10–11 mm. All specimens are recorded at light in the middle of September.
