= Tactusa ostium =

Scientific classification
- Domain: Eukaryota
- Kingdom: Animalia
- Phylum: Arthropoda
- Class: Insecta
- Order: Lepidoptera
- Superfamily: Noctuoidea
- Family: Erebidae
- Genus: Tactusa
- Species: T. ostium

Binomial name
- Tactusa ostium Fibiger, 2010

Species of moth

Tactusa ostium is a moth of the family Erebidae first described by Michael Fibiger in 2010. It is known from Thailand.

The wingspan is about 11 mm.
