= Paradoxica =

Scientific classification
- Domain: Eukaryota
- Kingdom: Animalia
- Phylum: Arthropoda
- Class: Insecta
- Order: Lepidoptera
- Superfamily: Noctuoidea
- Family: Erebidae
- Subtribe: Tactusina
- Genus: Paradoxica; Fibiger, 2011

Genus of moths

Paradoxica is a genus of moths of the family Erebidae by Michael Fibiger in 2011.

== Species ==
- Paradoxica parki Fibiger, 2011
- Paradoxica asymmetrica Fibiger, 2011
- Paradoxica proxima Fibiger, 2011
