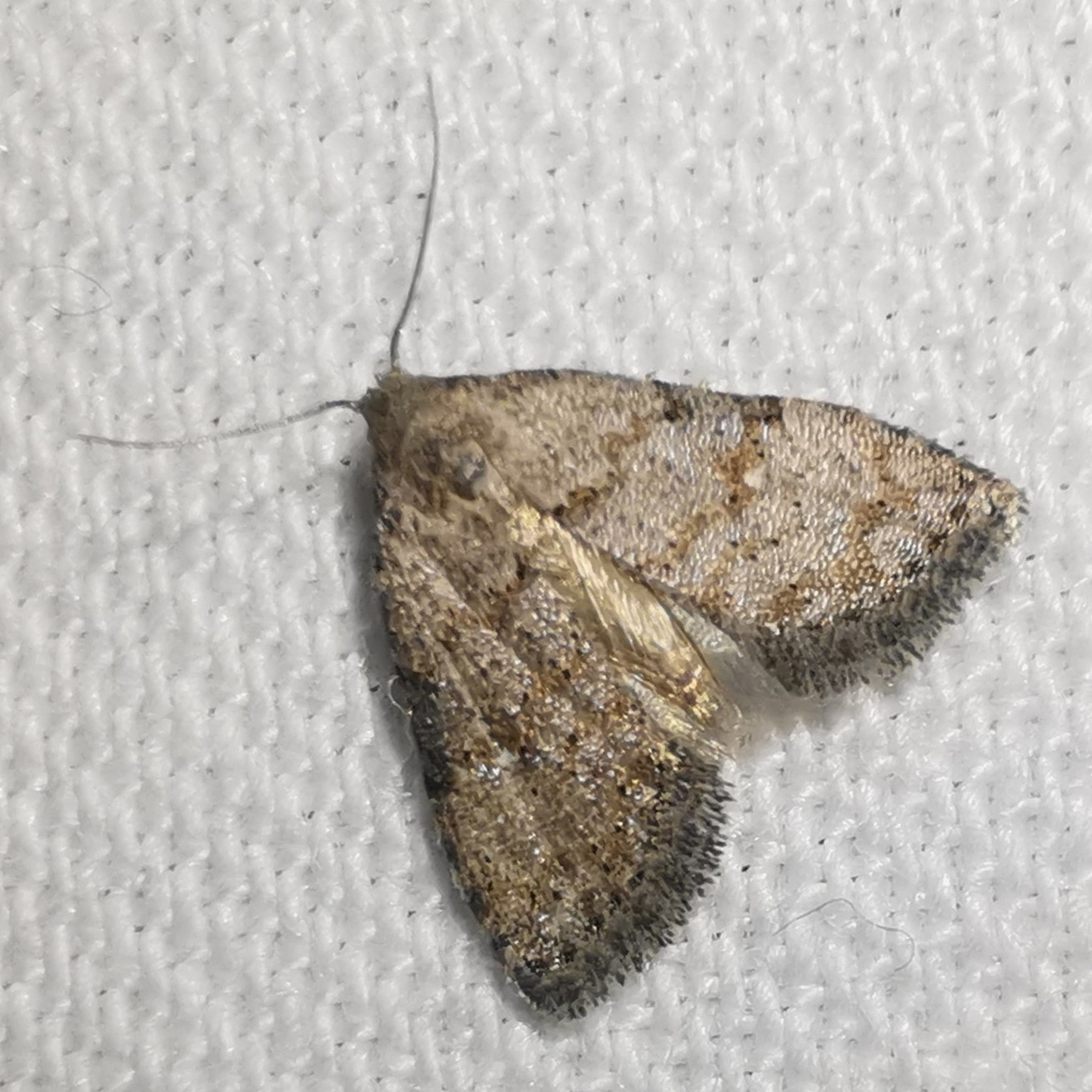

Scientific classification
- Domain: Eukaryota
- Kingdom: Animalia
- Phylum: Arthropoda
- Class: Insecta
- Order: Lepidoptera
- Superfamily: Noctuoidea
- Family: Erebidae
- Genus: Conspica
- Species: C. inconspicua

Binomial name
- Conspica inconspicua Fibiger, 2010

= Conspica inconspicua =

Species of moth

Conspica inconspicua is a species of moth in the family Erebidae that was first described by Michael Fibiger in 2010. It is known from Thailand.

The wingspan is about 9 mm.
