= Tactusa spadix =

Scientific classification
- Domain: Eukaryota
- Kingdom: Animalia
- Phylum: Arthropoda
- Class: Insecta
- Order: Lepidoptera
- Superfamily: Noctuoidea
- Family: Erebidae
- Genus: Tactusa
- Species: T. spadix

Binomial name
- Tactusa spadix Fibiger, 2010

Species of moth

Tactusa spadix is a moth of the family Erebidae first described by Michael Fibiger in 2010. It is known from southern Laos, in Southeast Asia.

== Description ==
The wingspan of Tactusa spadix is about 12 mm.
