= Tactusa virga =

Scientific classification
- Domain: Eukaryota
- Kingdom: Animalia
- Phylum: Arthropoda
- Class: Insecta
- Order: Lepidoptera
- Superfamily: Noctuoidea
- Family: Erebidae
- Genus: Tactusa
- Species: T. virga

Binomial name
- Tactusa virga Fibiger, 2011

Species of moth

Tactusa virga is a moth of the family Erebidae first described by Michael Fibiger in 2011. It is known from the Chinese province of Yunnan.

The wingspan is about 11.5 mm. The forewings are narrow. The head, patagia and base of the costa are black and the ground colour of the forewings is light brown, with a black costal-medial patch and a black subterminal and terminal area, including the fringe. The crosslines are absent, except for the terminal line, which is marked by black interveinal dots. The reniform stigma is beige, outlined by black. The hindwings are unicolorous grey, with a discal spot and the fringe is grey. The ventral surface is unicolorous light brown.

The biotope consists of subtropical forest vegetation. All specimens were collected at light in mid-September.
