= Burmese =

Burmese may refer to:

- Something of, from, or related to Myanmar, a country in Southeast Asia
- Burmese people
- Burmese language
- Burmese alphabet
- Burmese cuisine
- Burmese culture

== Animals ==
- Burmese cat
- Burmese chicken
- Burmese (horse), a horse given to Queen Elizabeth II
- Burmese pony, a breed of horse
- Burmese python

== See also ==
- Category:Burmese people
- Bamar people, the majority ethnic group in Myanmar
- Burmese English, the dialect of English spoken in Myanmar/Burma
- Bernese (disambiguation)
