= Paradoxica proxima =

Scientific classification
- Domain: Eukaryota
- Kingdom: Animalia
- Phylum: Arthropoda
- Class: Insecta
- Order: Lepidoptera
- Superfamily: Noctuoidea
- Family: Erebidae
- Genus: Paradoxica
- Species: P. proxima

Binomial name
- Paradoxica proxima Fibiger, 2011

Species of moth

Paradoxica proxima is a moth of the family Erebidae first described by Michael Fibiger in 2011. It is found in south-eastern China and northern Vietnam.

The wingspan is 11–12 mm (0.43–0.47 in).
