= Tactusa discrepans =

Scientific classification
- Domain: Eukaryota
- Kingdom: Animalia
- Phylum: Arthropoda
- Class: Insecta
- Order: Lepidoptera
- Superfamily: Noctuoidea
- Family: Erebidae
- Genus: Tactusa
- Species: T. discrepans

Binomial name
- Tactusa discrepans Fibiger, 2010

Species of moth

Tactusa discrepans is a moth of the family Erebidae first described by Michael Fibiger in 2010. It is known from northern Thailand and the Chinese provinces of Yunnan and Guizhou.

Adults have been recorded in April, July and October.

The wingspan is 9.5–12 mm.

== Subspecies ==
- Tactusa discrepans discrepans (northern Thailand)
- Tactusa discrepans yunnanensis Fibiger, 2011 (Yunnan and Guizhou)
