= Longiantrum =

Scientific classification
- Domain: Eukaryota
- Kingdom: Animalia
- Phylum: Arthropoda
- Class: Insecta
- Order: Lepidoptera
- Superfamily: Noctuoidea
- Family: Erebidae
- Subtribe: Tactusina
- Genus: Longiantrum; Fibiger, 2010

Genus of moths

Longiantrum is a genus of moths of the family Erebidae. The genus was erected by Michael Fibiger in 2010.

== Species ==
- Longiantrum coclea Fibiger, 2010
- Longiantrum legraini Fibiger, 2010
- Longiantrum burmaensis Fibiger, 2010
- Longiantrum quadra Fibiger, 2010
