= Nilgerides =

Scientific classification
- Domain: Eukaryota
- Kingdom: Animalia
- Phylum: Arthropoda
- Class: Insecta
- Order: Lepidoptera
- Superfamily: Noctuoidea
- Family: Erebidae
- Genus: Nilgerides; Fibiger, 2010
- Species: N. trifasciata

Binomial name
- Nilgerides trifasciata Fibiger, 2010

Genus of moths

Nilgerides is a monotypic moth genus of the family Erebidae. Its only species, Nilgerides trifasciata, is known from Sumatra. Both the genus and the species were first described by Michael Fibiger in 2010.

The wingspan is about 10 mm.
