= Tumula =

Scientific classification
- Domain: Eukaryota
- Kingdom: Animalia
- Phylum: Arthropoda
- Class: Insecta
- Order: Lepidoptera
- Superfamily: Noctuoidea
- Family: Erebidae
- Genus: Tumula; Fibiger, 2010
- Species: T. flavicollis

Binomial name
- Tumula flavicollis Fibiger, 2010

Genus of moths

Tumula is a monotypic moth genus of the family Erebidae. Its only species, Tumula flavicollis, is found in northern Thailand. Both the genus and the species were first described by Michael Fibiger in 2010.

The wingspan is about 10 mm.
