= Dorsum (moth) =

Scientific classification
- Domain: Eukaryota
- Kingdom: Animalia
- Phylum: Arthropoda
- Class: Insecta
- Order: Lepidoptera
- Superfamily: Noctuoidea
- Family: Erebidae
- Subtribe: Tactusina
- Genus: Dorsum; Fibiger, 2011

Genus of moths

Dorsum is a genus of moths of the family Erebidae erected by Michael Fibiger in 2011.

== Species ==
- Dorsum brunescens Fibiger, 2011
- Dorsum kwaii Fibiger, 2011
- Dorsum teraii Fibiger, 2011
- Dorsum bengali Fibiger, 2011
- Dorsum atlas Fibiger, 2011
