= Bernese =

Bernese is the adjectival form for the canton of Bern or for Bern.

Bernese may also refer to:

- Bernese German, a Swiss German dialect of Alemannic origin generally spoken in the canton of Bern and its capital, and in some neighbouring regions
- Bernese Mountain Dog, a member of the Swiss mountain dog breeds
