= Asylemissa =

Scientific classification
- Domain: Eukaryota
- Kingdom: Animalia
- Phylum: Arthropoda
- Class: Insecta
- Order: Lepidoptera
- Superfamily: Noctuoidea
- Family: Erebidae
- Genus: Asylemissa; Fibiger, 2010
- Species: A. comma

Binomial name
- Asylemissa comma Fibiger, 2010

Genus of moths

Asylemissa is a monotypic moth genus of the family Erebidae. Its only species, Asylemissa comma, is known from north-eastern Thailand. Both the genus and the species were first described by Michael Fibiger in 2010.

The wingspan is about 8 mm.
