= Clarior =

Scientific classification
- Domain: Eukaryota
- Kingdom: Animalia
- Phylum: Arthropoda
- Class: Insecta
- Order: Lepidoptera
- Superfamily: Noctuoidea
- Family: Erebidae
- Genus: Clarior; Fibiger, 2010
- Species: C. kitchingi

Binomial name
- Clarior kitchingi Fibiger, 2010

Genus of moths

Clarior is a monotypic moth genus of the family Erebidae. Its only species, Clarior kitchingi, is known from northern Thailand. Both the genus and the species were first described by Michael Fibiger in 2010.

The wingspan is about 10.5 mm.
