= Union of Burma (disambiguation) =

The Union of Burma was the official name of Myanmar (Burma) during various periods of its modern history. It may refer to the:

- Union of Burma (1948–1962), the Burmese state under the AFPFL-led civilian government
- Union of Burma (1962–1974), later known as the Socialist Republic of the Union of Burma (1974–1988), the Burmese state under the military dictatorship of Ne Win
- Union of Burma (1988–1989), later known as the Union of Myanmar (1989–2011), the Burmese state under the SPDC/SLORC military junta
- National Coalition Government of the Union of Burma (1990–2012), which claimed to be the government-in-exile of Myanmar (Burma)

== See also ==
- Names of Myanmar
