= Karrebæksminde, Næstved =

Karrebæksminde
- Town
- Location in Denmark Karrebæksminde (Denmark Region Zealand)
- Coordinates: 55°10′39″N 11°38′52″E
- Country: Denmark
- Region: Region Zealand
- Municipality: Næstved Municipality
- Parish: Karrebæk Parish

Area
  - Urban: 1.6 km^{2} (0.62 sq mi)

Population (2026)
  - Urban: 1,775
  - Urban density: 1,100/km^{2} (2,900/sq mi)
- Time zone: UTC+1 (CET)
  - Summer (DST): UTC+2 (CEST)
- Postal code: DK-4736 Karrebæksminde

Karrebæksminde is a coastal town, with a population of 1,775 (1 January 2026), in Næstved Municipality, Region Zealand in Denmark. It is located on the south coast of Zealand 10 km southwest of Næstved.

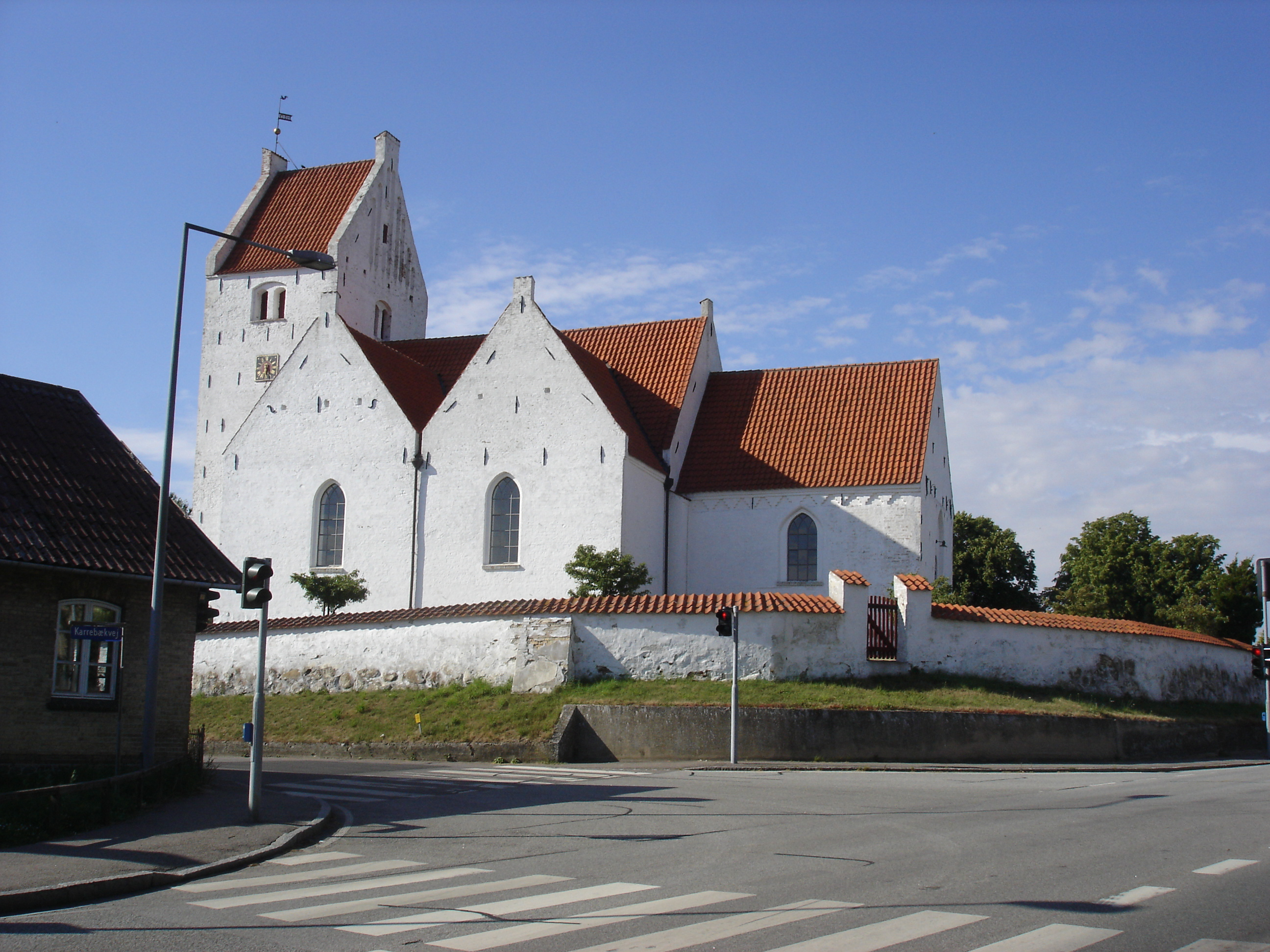
Karrebæk Church

Karrebæk Church is located in the former village of Karrebæk in the northern part of the town.

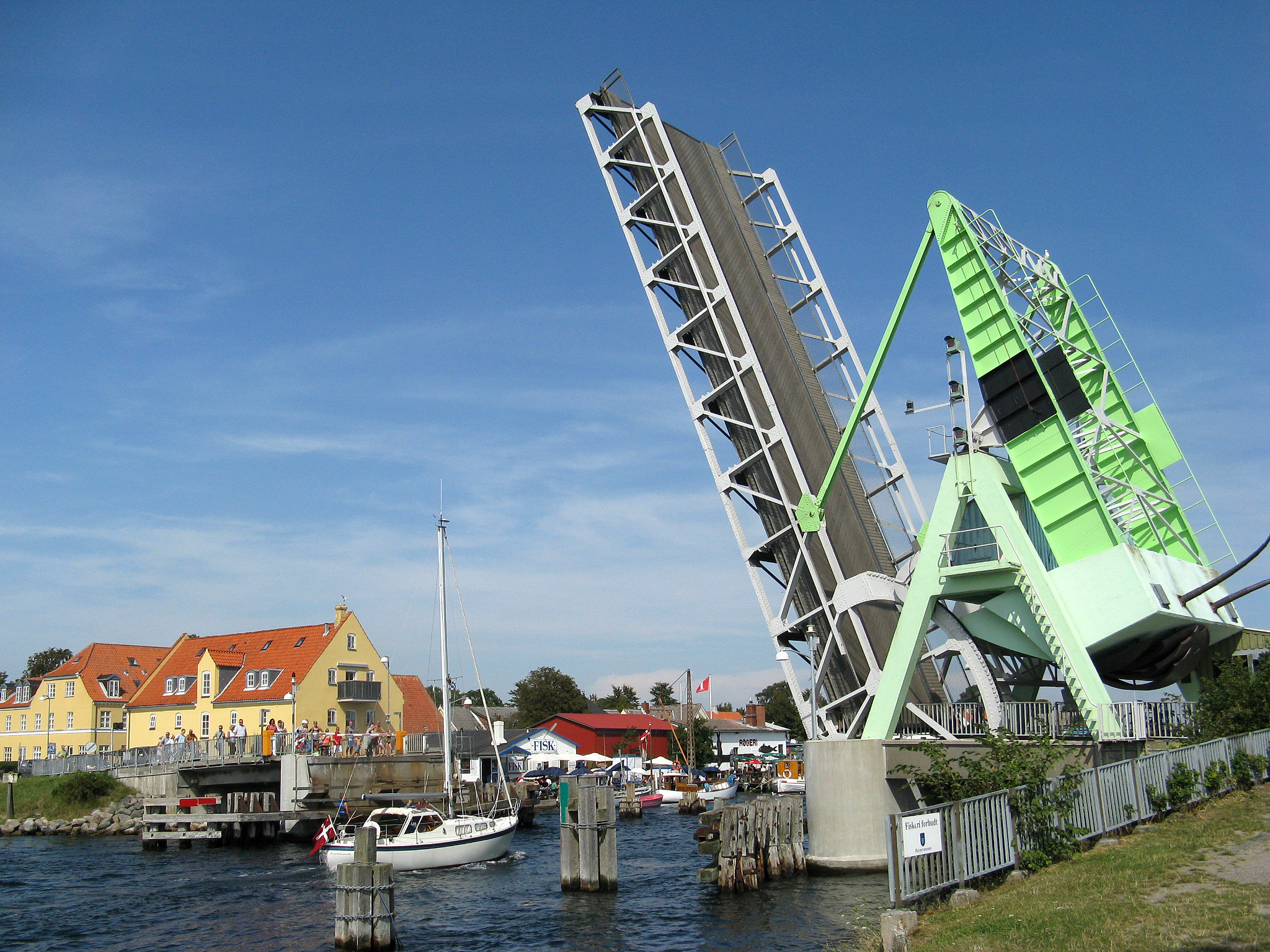
The Grasshopper Bridge

The Grasshopper Bridge or Karrebæksminde Bridge connects Karrebæksminde with the small island of Enø.
