= Obscurior =

Scientific classification
- Domain: Eukaryota
- Kingdom: Animalia
- Phylum: Arthropoda
- Class: Insecta
- Order: Lepidoptera
- Superfamily: Noctuoidea
- Family: Erebidae
- Subtribe: Tactusina
- Genus: Obscurior; Fibiger, 2011

Synonyms
- Obscura Fibiger, 2010 (preocc. Wagner, 1897)

Genus of moths

Obscurior is a genus of moths of the family Erebidae erected by Michael Fibiger in 2010.

== Species ==
- Obscurior lateraprocessa Fibiger, 2010
- Obscurior clarus Fibiger, 2010
- Obscurior niasiensis Fibiger, 2010
- Obscurior fragilis Fibiger, 2010
- Obscurior davisi Fibiger, 2010
