= Costasensora =

Scientific classification
- Domain: Eukaryota
- Kingdom: Animalia
- Phylum: Arthropoda
- Class: Insecta
- Order: Lepidoptera
- Superfamily: Noctuoidea
- Family: Erebidae
- Genus: Costasensora; Fibiger, 2010
- Species: C. honeyi

Binomial name
- Costasensora honeyi Fibiger, 2010

Genus of moths

Costasensora is a monotypic moth genus of the family Erebidae. Its only species, Costasensora honeyi, is known from Borneo. Both the genus and the species were first described by Michael Fibiger in 2010.

The wingspan is about 11 mm.
