= Asytegumen =

Scientific classification
- Domain: Eukaryota
- Kingdom: Animalia
- Phylum: Arthropoda
- Class: Insecta
- Order: Lepidoptera
- Superfamily: Noctuoidea
- Family: Erebidae
- Genus: Asytegumen; Fibiger, 2010
- Species: A. absurdus

Binomial name
- Asytegumen absurdus Fibiger, 2010

Genus of moths

Asytegumen is a monotypic moth genus of the family Erebidae. Its only species, Asytegumen absurdus, is known from Borneo. Both the genus and the species were first described by Michael Fibiger in 2010.
