= Dignius =

Scientific classification
- Kingdom: Animalia
- Phylum: Arthropoda
- Class: Insecta
- Order: Lepidoptera
- Superfamily: Noctuoidea
- Family: Erebidae
- Genus: Dignius (Fibiger, 2010)
- Species: D. buchsbaumi

Binomial name
- Dignius buchsbaumi Fibiger, 2011

Synonyms
- Generic: Dignus Fibiger, 2010 (preocc. Pelman, 1985); Specific: Dignus buchsbaumi Fibiger, 2010

Genus of moths

Dignius is a monotypic moth genus of the family Erebidae. Its only species, Dignius buchsbaumi, is known from Bali. Both the genus and the species were first described by Michael Fibiger, the genus in 2010 and the species one year later.

The wingspan is about 12 mm.
