= Tantulius =

Scientific classification
- Domain: Eukaryota
- Kingdom: Animalia
- Phylum: Arthropoda
- Class: Insecta
- Order: Lepidoptera
- Superfamily: Noctuoidea
- Family: Erebidae
- Genus: Tantulius; Fibiger, 2010
- Species: T. belli

Binomial name
- Tantulius belli Fibiger, 2010

Genus of moths

Tantulius is a monotypic moth genus of the family Erebidae. Its only species, Tantulius belli, is known from southern India. Both the genus and the species were first described by Michael Fibiger in 2010.

The wingspan is about 8 mm.
