= Bruma parvus =

Scientific classification
- Domain: Eukaryota
- Kingdom: Animalia
- Phylum: Arthropoda
- Class: Insecta
- Order: Lepidoptera
- Superfamily: Noctuoidea
- Family: Erebidae
- Genus: Bruma; Fibiger, 2010
- Species: B. parvus

Binomial name
- Bruma parvus Fibiger, 2010

Species of moth

Bruma parvus is the only species in the monotypic moth genus Bruma of the family Erebidae. It is known from North Sumatra in Indonesia. Both the genus and the species were first described by Michael Fibiger in 2010.

The wingspan is 9–10 mm.
