= Burmah (ship) =

History
- Name: Burmah
- Operator: Willis, Gann & Co
- Fate: Declared lost 1860

General characteristics
- Type: Passenger ship

Burmah was a passenger ship, which disappeared en route from England to New Zealand in 1859 or 1860.

== Last voyage ==
Burmah was chartered by Willis, Gann & Co. The ship left London for New Zealand on 30 August 1859. Burmah was seen by the ship Regina on 17 November, about 14 days sailing distance west of New Zealand, at 48°S 97°E. Regina passed icebergs the day after it passed Burmah. Burmah never arrived at New Zealand and was officially declared lost by Lloyds on 6 May 1860.

Burmah was carrying passengers and an assortment of breeding livestock.

The novelist Samuel Butler was booked to travel on Burmah to New Zealand, but he changed to a different ship, Roman Emperor, at the last moment, and therefore avoided the loss of Burmah.
