= Peren =

Peren may refer to:

== People ==
=== Surname ===
- Geoffrey Peren, agricultural scientist and military officer
- Franz Wilhelm Peren, German economist, co-creator of the Peren–Clement index
- Maggie Peren, German screenwriter and film director

== Places ==
=== india ===
- Peren district, a district in Nagaland, India
  - Peren Assembly constituency, legislative assembly in Nagaland, India
  - Peren (town), a town in Nagaland, India
  - Peren Government College, college in Peren, Nagaland
  - Peren Circle
    - Old Peren, a village
    - New Peren, a village
    - Peren Namdi, a village

== Other ==
- Peren–Clement index, a method of risk analysis

== See also ==
- Perren
- Perin (disambiguation)
- Paren (disambiguation)
