= Tentaxina =

Scientific classification
- Domain: Eukaryota
- Kingdom: Animalia
- Phylum: Arthropoda
- Class: Insecta
- Order: Lepidoptera
- Superfamily: Noctuoidea
- Family: Erebidae
- Tribe: Micronoctuini
- Subtribe: Tentaxina; Fibiger, 2011

Synonyms
- Tentaxinae Fibiger, 2011

Subtribe of moths

The Tentaxina are a subtribe of moths of the family Erebidae. The clade was described by Michael Fibiger in 2011.

== Taxonomy ==
The subtribe was originally described as the subfamily Tentaxinae of the family Micronoctuidae.

== Genera ==
- Acusa Fibiger, 2011
- Tentasetae Fibiger, 2011
- Pseudobscura Fibiger, 2011
- Parens Fibiger, 2011
- Alienia Fibiger, 2011
- Tentaspina Fibiger, 2011
- Tentax Fibiger, 2011
- Flax Fibiger, 2011
