= Pirin (disambiguation) =

Pirin is a mountain range in Bulgaria.

Pirin may also refer to:

== Places ==
- Pirin National Park, a protected area in Bulgaria
- Pirin, Blagoevgrad Province, a village in Bulgaria
- Pirin, Kreševo, a village in Bosnia and Herzegovina
- Pirin, Iran, a village in Iran
- Pirin Glacier, in Antarctica

== Football clubs ==
- OFC Pirin Blagoevgrad
- PFC Pirin Blagoevgrad
- FC Pirin Gotse Delchev
- FC Pirin Razlog

== Other uses ==
- Pirin Folk Ensemble, a Bulgarian music and dance group
- SS Pirin, a Bulgarian steamship in service 1961–65

== See also ==
- Pirin Macedonia, a historic region
- Pirin-Fiat, a brand of cars
- Pyrin
- Perin (disambiguation)
