= Maurice Perrin =

Maurice Perrin may refer to:

- Maurice Perrin (bishop) (1904–1994), French bishop in Tunisia, diplomat
- Maurice Perrin (cyclist) (1911–1992), French Olympic cyclist
- Maurice Perrin (physician) (1875–1956), French physician

== See also ==
- Perrin (disambiguation)
