= Perin =

Perin may refer to:

- Perín, a village in Slovakia
- Perin, Iran, a village in Iran
- Perin Village Site, an archaeological site in the United States
- Perin (name), a list of people with the name

== See also ==
- Perrin (disambiguation)
- Peren (disambiguation)
- Peryn
- Pirin (disambiguation)
