= Paren (disambiguation) =

A paren is a parenthesis.

Paren, Paren' or PAREN may also refer to:

- Paren (village), a village in Kamchatka Krai, Russia
  - Paren knife, a knife produced in Paren'
- Paren (river), a river in northeastern Russia
- Paren space, a blank typographic unit equal to the size of a parenthesis
- PAREN, a political party in Burkina Faso

== See also ==
- Parens (disambiguation)
- Peren (disambiguation)
