= Perren =

Perren is a surname. Notable people with the surname include:

- Bernhard Perren (1928–1960), Swiss alpine skier and mountain guide
- Clinton Perren (born 1975), Australian cricketer who played for Queensland
- Diego Perren (born 1965), Swiss curler and Olympic champion
- Fabricio Perren (born 1988), Grand Prix motorcycle racer from Argentina
- Freddie Perren (1943–2004), American songwriter, record producer, arranger, and orchestra conductor
- George Perren (1827–1909), English tenor active in both concert and opera
- Gottlieb Perren (1926–2014), Swiss skier
- Jeff Perren, American game designer
- Kevin van der Perren (born 1982), Belgian figure skater

== See also ==
- Perren Baker (1877–1974), Canadian politician who served as Alberta's Minister of Education from 1921 until 1935
- François-Tommy Perrens (1822–1901), French historian
- Mount Perren, located on the border of Alberta and British Columbia on the Continental Divide
- Peren (disambiguation)
- Perrin (disambiguation)
- Perron (disambiguation)
