= Antimonopoly Policy Improvement Center =

Antimonopoly Policy Improvement Center (APIC) is a leading think-tank, non-commercial (not-for profit) and independent research institution which focuses in competition, innovation, business (support of entrepreneurship) and consumer policies in Uzbekistan. APIC's slogan mark is "Knowledge for development", which APIC tries to achieve through the results of its products. Members of the staff consists of young and professional specialists from the leading universities of US, UK and other developed countries. It is the first institution in Uzbekistan, which started publishing monthly business activity index (APIC 50) in July 2009, which consists of surveys from the large and medium-sized companies, representing leading and the most dynamic spheres of Uzbekistan's economy. One of its flagship research products was the study of remittances in Uzbekistan, conducted with the financial assistance of International Development Research Centre of Canada (https://web.archive.org/web/20081209143200/http://www.idrc.ca/uploads/user-S/11949815321Uzbekistan.pdf) and on innovation policies in Uzbekistan. APIC also conducts due diligence, risk analysis, market studies, nationwide surveys (SPSS), trainings and seminars.

APIC was established in August 2003 to increase the practical orientation of researches and to improve the development of normative-legal basis in the sphere of competition, natural monopolies, consumer rights protection, innovation and support of entrepreneurship. APIC's other focus areas include analysis of the demonopolization processes and improving competition policy, drafting and providing an expertise on the proposed projects of normative-legal acts, study of the processes of restructuring the administration system in monopolized sectors and development of proposals on creating a sound competitive environment and favorable conditions for small and medium-sized businesses operation in the market.

It also closely cooperates with international finance and research institutions such as International Finance Corporation, Asian Development Bank, International Development Research Centre and others.

With the purpose of implementation of the objectives set on deepening economic reforms and demonopolization, improvement of corporate governance structure, creation of competitive environment in the product markets and facilitation of SMEs development, APIC helps the National Competition Authority to conduct analysis of competition in various product markets, assessing the extent to which the competition exists in those markets, the level of their monopolization, market concentration and market entry barriers. Results the work, proposals and recommendations on elimination of barriers for a market entry and development of competition mechanisms in the markets are developed and brought to the notice of appropriate undertakings, ministries and agencies with the purpose of making them take appropriate measures to improve the current situation.

APIC has a history of working with various international financial institutions, particularly with Asian Development Bank (International Law Institute) in 2004 and 2005 on the project of "Institutional Strengthening of the State Committee of De-monopolization and Competition Development of the Republic of Uzbekistan." Other institutions include technical assistance with Japanese International Cooperation Agency (JICA), German Technical Center (GTZ), and others.

== International research and development projects ==
1. Development and organization of business activity index of the Republic of Uzbekistan (July 2009–present);
2. Development of national innovation policy with United Nations Development Programme (UNDP) (2008);
3. Development and realization of "Long-term framework program with [the United Nations Conference on Trade and Development (UNCTAD) on competition law and policy;
4. Research project on "Improving the legislation of Uzbekistan on intellectual property Rights Protection" funded by Organization for Security and Co-operation in Europe (OSCE, May 2007-December 2008);
5. Research project "Analysis of Competition in international remittances market" funded by International Development Research Center (IDRC, Canada, July 2006-February 2007);
6. Development project on "Institutional improvement of the Uzbek Competition Authority" funded by Asian Development Bank Uzbekistan (January 2004- April 2005).

APIC has conducted more than 20 research projects, with 20 publications in national and international academic and professional journals.

== Completed research projects ==
1. Development issues of consumer crediting and credit history systems in Uzbekistan;
2. Small businesses and banking, issues, obstacle and means of resolving them;
3. Remittances Market (Development, Competition and Trends in Uzbekistan (IDRC, Canada) - http://www.idrc.ca/uploads/user-S/11949815321Uzbekistan.pdf);
4. Taxation of Small and Medium Size Entrepreneurship;
5. International Practice and Methods of Financial Markets Regulation;
6. Merger and Acquisitions, Effective Control Mechanisms;
7. Price regulation in the economy and its impact to competitive environment;
8. Intellectual Property Rights Protection System in Uzbekistan;
9. Innovations and means of stimulating them in developing countries;
10. Natural monopolies and their effective and modern methods of regulation;
11. Development of methodologies on studying the competition issues in the markets;
12. Development of methodologies on the analysis of dominant positions on the markets;
13. Small businesses and private operators in public utilities sectors;
14. Development of credit history institutions in the Republic of Uzbekistan.

== Publications ==
1. "Competition authorities in bad times - an open and fair overview from an Asian country in transition", pp. 115 – 118, Studies and researches relating to economic competition, journal of territorial survey directorate competition council - Romania Anno IV, No. 1 (7), June 2009, Bucharest, Romania;
2. Economy of Uzbekistan", pp. 48 – 49, Informational-analytical review 2008, prepared in cooperation of United Nations' project on Reform Process Assistance in Uzbekistan, Center for Economic Research, 2009, Tashkent, Uzbekistan;
3. "New tendencies in the realization of competition policy in the Republic of Uzbekistan", Compendium of scientific works dedicated to the smoothing factors of the impact of financial and economic crisis on the economy of Uzbekistan and the ways to overcome it, Economic faculty, Uzbek National University, pp. 442–445, 2009 Tashkent, Uzbekistan;
4. "The Role of Competition in Anticrisis Measures", ReguLetter, Volume 10, No. 1/2009, CUTS Centre for Competition, Investment & Economic Regulation (CUTS CCIER), Jaipur, India;
5. The development of competition policy in Uzbekistan, Competition and Antitrust Review 2009, Euromoney Yearbooks, London, UK;
6. "Understanding the Scale of the Opportunity to Offer International Remittance Services to Under-Banked Migrant Workers across the Region", presented under the "Reaching The Next Wave Of Customers With Lower-Cost Services" at the 5th annual Eurasia Com Conference, 2009, Istanbul, Turkey;
7. "The role of competition authorities during economic crises", OECD, Global Competition Forum, February, 2009, Paris, France (http://www.olis.oecd.org/olis/2009doc.nsf/ENGDATCORPLOOK/NT00000AD2/$FILE/JT03259265.PDF);
8. "Introducing small businesses into public utilities", Antimonopoly Policy Improvement Center, December 2008, Tashkent, Uzbekistan;
9. "Increasing the role of commodity exchanges in developing competition" Exchange expert magazine, 1-2 editions, April, 2008, Tashkent, Uzbekistan;
10. "Competition Research Improves Services" in cooperation with Globalization, Growth and Poverty Program at International Development Research Centre (IDRC), 2008, Canada;
11. "Competition policy in Uzbekistan", December 2007 (circulation 500), Tashkent, Uzbekistan;
12. "New times – new opportunities", Taxpayers' Magazine, April, 2007, Tashkent, Uzbekistan;
13. "Towards less monopolized economy", Huquq (The Law), January–February, 2007, Tashkent, Uzbekistan;
14. "International Experience of Effective Merger and Acquisitions Control Mechanisms and their Applicability to Uzbekistan (Competition Policy)", 3rd Conference of Foreign Educated Young Professionals Publication, Volume II, 2006, Tashkent, Uzbekistan;
15. "Learning how to compete correctly", Pravda Vostoka, September 16, 2006, Tashkent, Uzbekistan;
16. "Antimonopoly Policy in Uzbekistan, new approach and trends" Biznes Vestnik Vostoka "Eastern Business Daily", September 2006, Tashkent, Uzbekistan;
17. "The competition and entrepreneurship will be always supported" "Halq sozi", September, 2006, Tashkent, Uzbekistan
18. "Regulation of Advertisement Market, Trends, Issues and Perspective", 2nd Conference of Foreign Educated Young Professionals Publication, Volume III, 2005, Tashkent, Uzbekistan.

== Website ==
- https://web.archive.org/web/20100827054752/http://apic.uz/
