= François Valentin =

French politician and military general

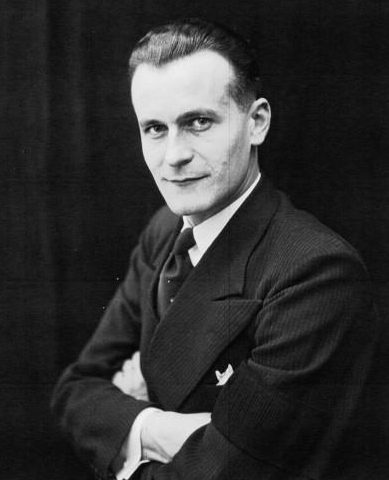

Chamber of Deputies (Third Republic)
- In office 23 November 1958 – 24 September 1961
- Constituency: Toul, Meurthe-et-Moselle

Council of the Republic
- In office 1 January 1956 – 23 November 1958
- Preceded by: Pierre de Boissonneaux de Chevigny
- Constituency: Meurthe et Moselle

National Assembly
- In office 3 May 1936 – 31 May 1942

Personal details
- Born: 8 August 1909
- Died: 24 September 1961 (aged 52) Chambley-Bussieres
- Party: National Centre of Independents and Peasants
- Relations: Maurice Perrin (Uncle)
- Education: University of Lorraine

François Charles Joseph Valentin (French pronunciation: [fʁɑ̃swa ʃaʁl ʒozɛf valɑ̃tɛ̃]; 8 August 1909 – 24 September 1961) was a French politician and military general. During World War II, he led the French Legion of Combatants from 1941 to 1942 before joining the Resistance. He was deputy of the Third Republic, senator of the Fourth Republic and deputy of the fifth Republic.

== Early life and education ==
Valetin was born as a son of an attorney at the Court of Appeal of Nancy and a mother from the Vosges. He is also the nephew of Maurice Perrin, professor of medicine in Nancy and national municipal councilor, and of Jules Valentin, president of the Fraternité Saint-Léon, both close to the Jeunesses patriotes.

François Valentin studied at the Collège de la Malgrange and at the lycée Saint-Sigisbert and then at the faculté de droit de Nancy. In the meantime, he was doing his military service as a second lieutenant in the 10th battalion in Saverne. He would later become vice-president of the reserve officers of Nancy. He was unanimously appointed in 1935 to represent the 20th district on the board of directors of the l'Union nationale des officiers de réserve (National Union of Reserve Officers).

== Political career ==
Very early on, Valetin had an interest in politics. He was then a "national" Republican, hostile to the parliamentary regime, which he described as a "revolting regime" in a 1930 letter to Marshal Lyautey, being from the networks of the Jeunesses patriotes, of which he was a member since 1934, and of the Republican Federation, his name is noted in several political meetings of these groupings. He was general secretary of the Nancy daily L'Éclair de l'Est, controlled by Louis Marin, from November 1934 to 1936.

During the 1936 French legislative election, he was elected in the second round deputy for Meurthe-et-Moselle with the help of activists from the Republican Federation and its allies. He was up against politician René Goepfert, the outgoing deputy Émile Seitz, Pierre-Henri Teitgen of the Popular Democratic Party, René Galas and Louis Marin of the National and Social Republican Union Committee of Nancy. He allied with Louis Marin and visited François de Wendel. He was then the youngest deputy in France, at 26 years old. He joined the Republican Federation group. In an appeal to voters during the election campaign, he established two blocks facing each other and boiled down the election to a few choices: for or against the fatherland, for social union or for the class struggle, for the safeguard of freedom or for dictatorship. One of his leaflets asked voters “to spare France the convulsions of civil war desired by the soviets”.

=== During the Vichy regime ===
Coat of arms of the French Legion of Fighters

He became deputy director of the French Legion of fighters and was then appointed in March 1941 by Philippe Pétain as head of the Legion, succeeding his friend Xavier Vallat. The latter, former Secretary General for Veterans Affairs, was appointed Commissioner for Jewish Affairs. He directed the Legion in a patriotic, anti-German line. At that date, the Legion was one and a half million strong. In September 1941, he could not prevent the creation of a "civic committee" within the Legion, made up of moderate elements and more committed men like Joseph Darnand. Pétain sent him a letter on December 18, 1941, which is a disavowal and an acknowledgment of the failure of the actions by the Legion. In January 1942, Joseph Darnand's Legionary Order Service was created and integrated into the Legion.

=== The Resistance ===
François Valentin protested against General Maxime Weygand recall to mainland France, while dissuaded him from presenting his resignation to Philippe Pétain. On November 18, 1941, alongside other Legion executives, he requested an interview with Pétain and said:

Marshal, we regret, for the first time, we, your soldiers, disobey you. From the bottom of our hearts, we adjure you: do not sacrifice General Weygand... It will be useless. The Germans will not thank you for it. Take care, Monsieur le Maréchal, take care of yourself.

He resigned in May 1942 during the return of Pierre Laval, which wants to make the SOL more autonomous within the French Legion of Combatants. The SOL would become the French Militia in 1943. He did not break openly with the Vichy regime yet. In June 1942, the press published his declaration to the legionnaires in which he expressed his "unalterable gratitude" to Marshal Pétain. He asked the legionnaires to remain "united around the marshal and the leaders he appoints to you" and to put their energy "at the service of the National Revolution”.

Valentin joined the Tulle bar and defended General de Lattre who appeared in January 1943 for having disobeyed orders forbidding him to resist German troops entering the Zone libre. Subsequently, he went into hiding and joined the secret army under the pseudonym of Frédéric Vautrin, then, at the head of an FFI battalion in the Tarn, under that of Commander Vincenot. He later joined the Army Resistance Organization (Organisation de résistance de l'armée).

== Honors ==
- Croix de Guerre 1939–1945 (June 1, 1940)
