= Francis Perrin =

Francis Perrin may refer to:

- Francis Perrin (actor) (born 1947), French actor, screenwriter and director
- Francis Perrin (physicist) (1901–1992), French physicist

== See also ==
- Perrin (disambiguation)
