= Parens (disambiguation) =

Parens are a set of parentheses.

Parens may also refer to:

== Taxonomy ==
=== Genus ===
- Parens (moth), a genus of moths

=== Species ===
- Xylomya parens (X. parens), a species of fly
- Horornis parens (H. parens), a species of bird
- Areca parens (A. parens), a species of flowering plant
- Chionodes parens (C. parens), a species of moth
- Strabena excellens (Strabena parens), a species of butterfly

== People ==
- Johannes Parens (died 1250), Italian Friar Minor
- Joshua Parens, American professor of philosophy

== Others ==
- Parens patriae, a legal term
- Parens scientiarum, the incipit designating a papal bull issued by Pope Gregory IX

== See also ==
- Paren (disambiguation)
