= Hannah Lynch =

Lynch, Hannah (1859–1904), novelist and journalist

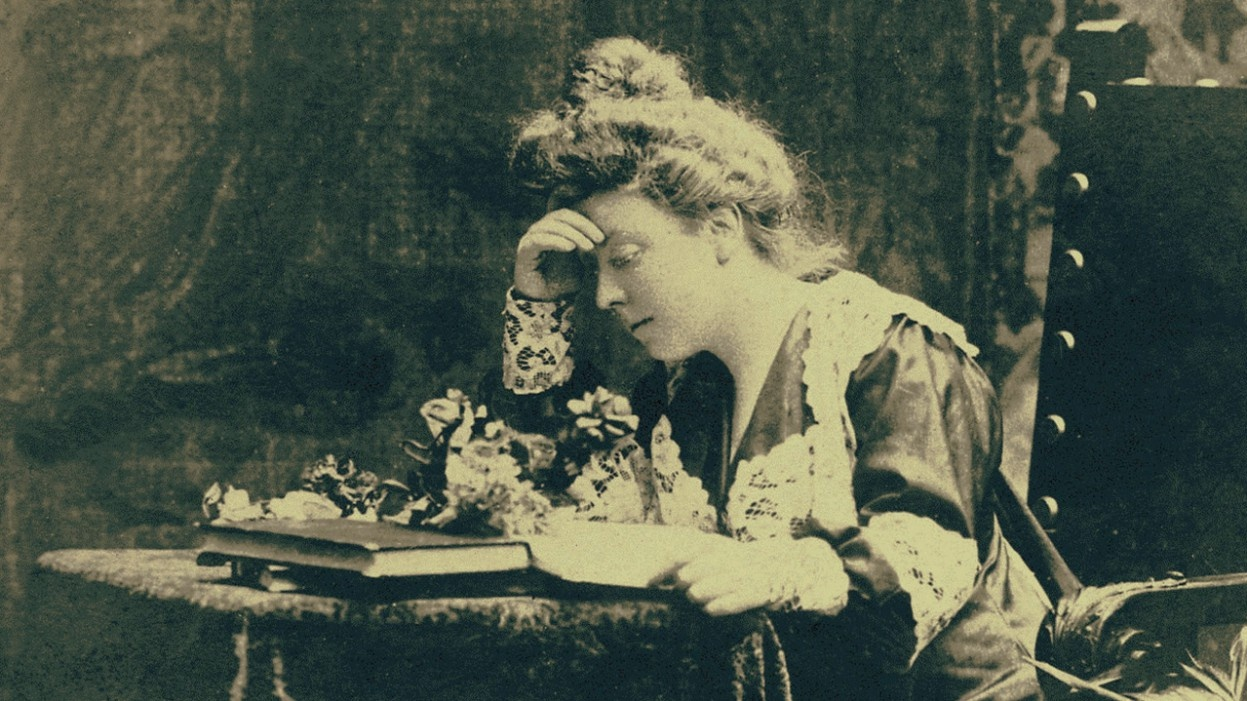
- Born: 25 March 1859; Dublin, Ireland
- Died: 9 January 1904 (aged 44); Paris, France
- Occupation: Writer
- Writing career
- Pen name: Hannah Lynch

Hannah Lynch (25 March 1859 – 9 January 1904) was an Irish feminist, novelist, journalist and translator. She spent much of her working life in Paris.

== Life ==
Hannah Lynch was born in Dublin on 25 March 1859. Her father died when she was young. Her mother was married twice. Her father was a committed, non-violent Fenian. Lynch herself grew up in a very female house with her mother, Anna Theresa Calderwood, and ten sisters and half-sisters. Her stepfather was James Cantwell, also a Fenian, who ran the Star and Garter Hotel. After finishing school Lynch worked as a sub-editor for a provincial paper and as a governess in Europe.

A nationalist like her father and stepfather, Lynch was an executive member of the Ladies' Land League and as a result closely associated with Fanny Parnell. She wrote extensively, producing short stories and satirical sketches, as well as Land War fiction, travel writing, translations and literary criticism. Her satirical pieces included "A Dublin Literary Coterie Sketched by a Non-Pretentious Observer" (1888) and "My Friend Arcanieva" (1895). Lynch published William O'Brien's paper United Ireland from France, once it had been suppressed in Ireland. She disagreed with Yeats on the literary merit of Emily Lawless, calling her work "highly polished literary stories".

Lynch also wrote fiction on the subject of political and cultural affairs in Ireland, sometimes meeting controversy. Her first novel, Through Troubled Waters (1885), was a fictionalised version of a real-life incident in Galway in which the daughters of a prosperous landowning family were murdered to make way for the sons to inherit the land. The novel also depicted the rural clergy as complicit, by denouncing the victims from the pulpit. The newspaper United Ireland strongly criticised the novel, claiming it peddled in anti-Irish stereotypes for a British audience. Lynch responded by stating that she had intended the book for an Irish publisher and audience, and that she should not be asked “to prove my patriotism at the expense of truth”.

Lynch published across Ireland, the UK and from Paris. By 1896, Lynch had settled in Paris, having also lived in both Spain and Greece. She spoke Greek and French. Lynch then returned to lecture in Ireland and was a part of the Paris salons of the Belle Epoque as well as the Irish Literary Revival in Dublin. She was friends with the historian, biographer and literary critic "Arvède Barine" (Louise-Cécile Vincens), the writers Mabel and Mary Robinson, and the medievalist Gaston Paris. Her work however did not bring significant income and Lynch was forced to apply to the Royal Literary Fund for help on multiple occasions. Eventually it had a toll on her health. She spent time in hospital in Margate in 1903.

She died in Paris in 1904.

== Bibliography ==
=== Fiction ===
- Defeated: A Tale [Beeton's Christmas Annual] (London: Ward, Lock & Co., 1885)
- Through Troubled Waters: A Novel (London: Ward, Lock & Co., 1885)
- The Princes of the Glades: A Novel, 2 vols (London, 1891)
- George Meredith: A Study (London: Methuen & Co., 1891)
- Rosni Harvey: A Novel, 3 vols (London: Chapman & Hall, 1892)
- Daughters of Men: A Novel (London: William Heinemann, 1892)
- Denys D'Auvrillac: A Story of French Life (London, 1896)
- Dr. Vermont's Fantasy and Other Stories (London: J. M. Dent & Co., 1896)
- Jinny Blake: A Tale (London: J. M. Dent & Co., 1897)
- An Odd Experiment (London: Methuen & Co., 1897)
- Clare Monro: The Story of a Mother and Daughter [Milne's Express Ser.] (London: J. Milne, 1896)
- Autobiography of a Child (Edinburgh: William Blackwood & Sons, 1899)

=== Translations ===
- The History of Florence under the Domination of Cosimo, Piero, Lorenzo de' Médicis, 1434–1492, by F.-T. Perrens, Vol. 1 (London: Methuen & Co., 1892)
- The History of Florence from the Domination of the Medici to the Fall of the Republic: 1434–1531, by F.-T. Perrens (London: Methuen & Co., 1892)
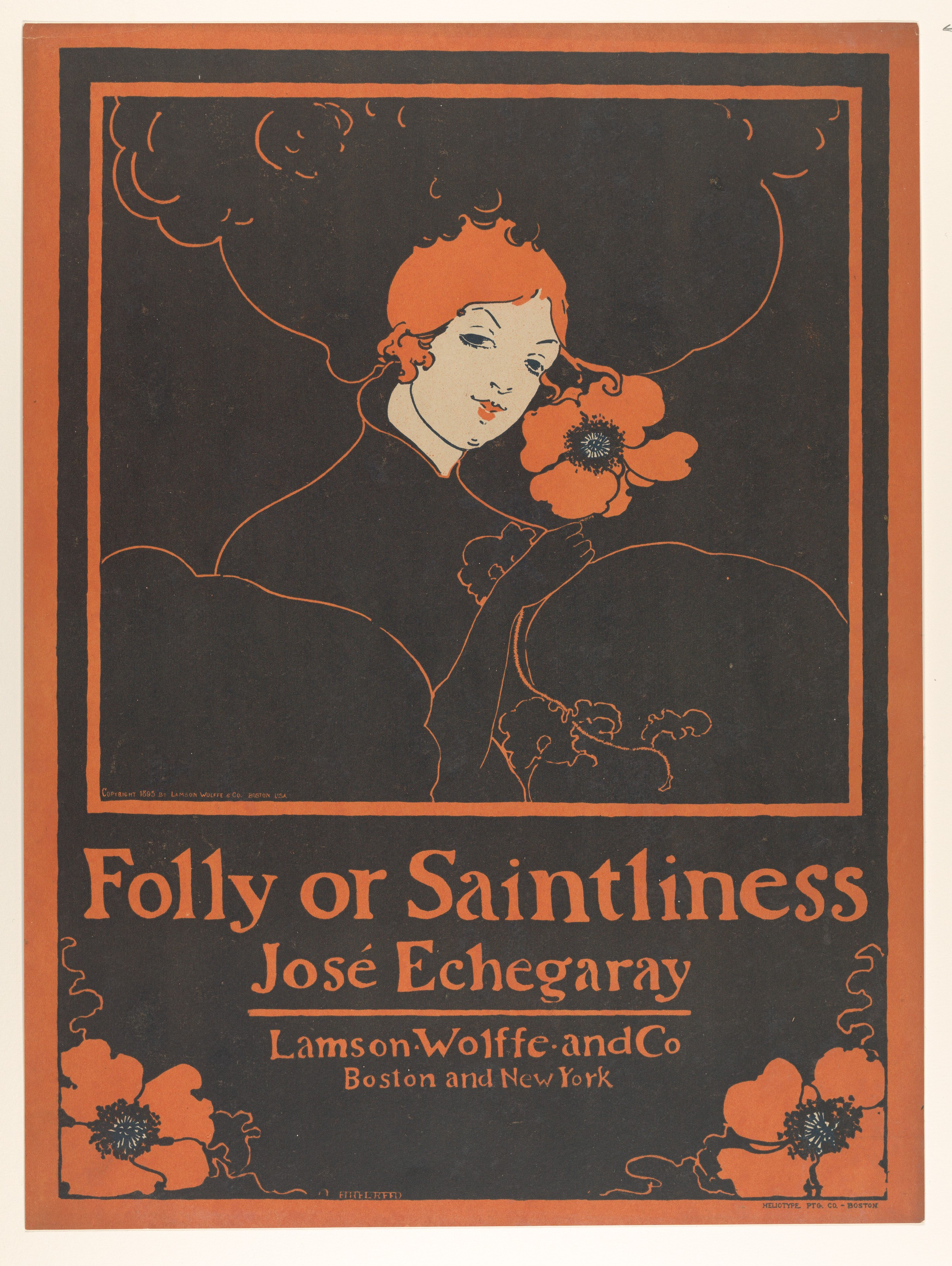
- Folly or Saintliness MET
  The Great Galeoto; Folly or Saintliness. Two plays done from the verse of José Echegaray (London: John Lane, 1895)
- Toledo: The Story of an Old Spanish Capital, illustrated by Helen M. James. Mediaeval Town Series (London: J. M. Dent & Co., 1898)
- French Life in Town and Country Our Neighbours Series. (London: Dawson, 1901)
- Mediæval French Literature, by Gaston Paris. Temple Primers. (London, 1903), 15 cm
