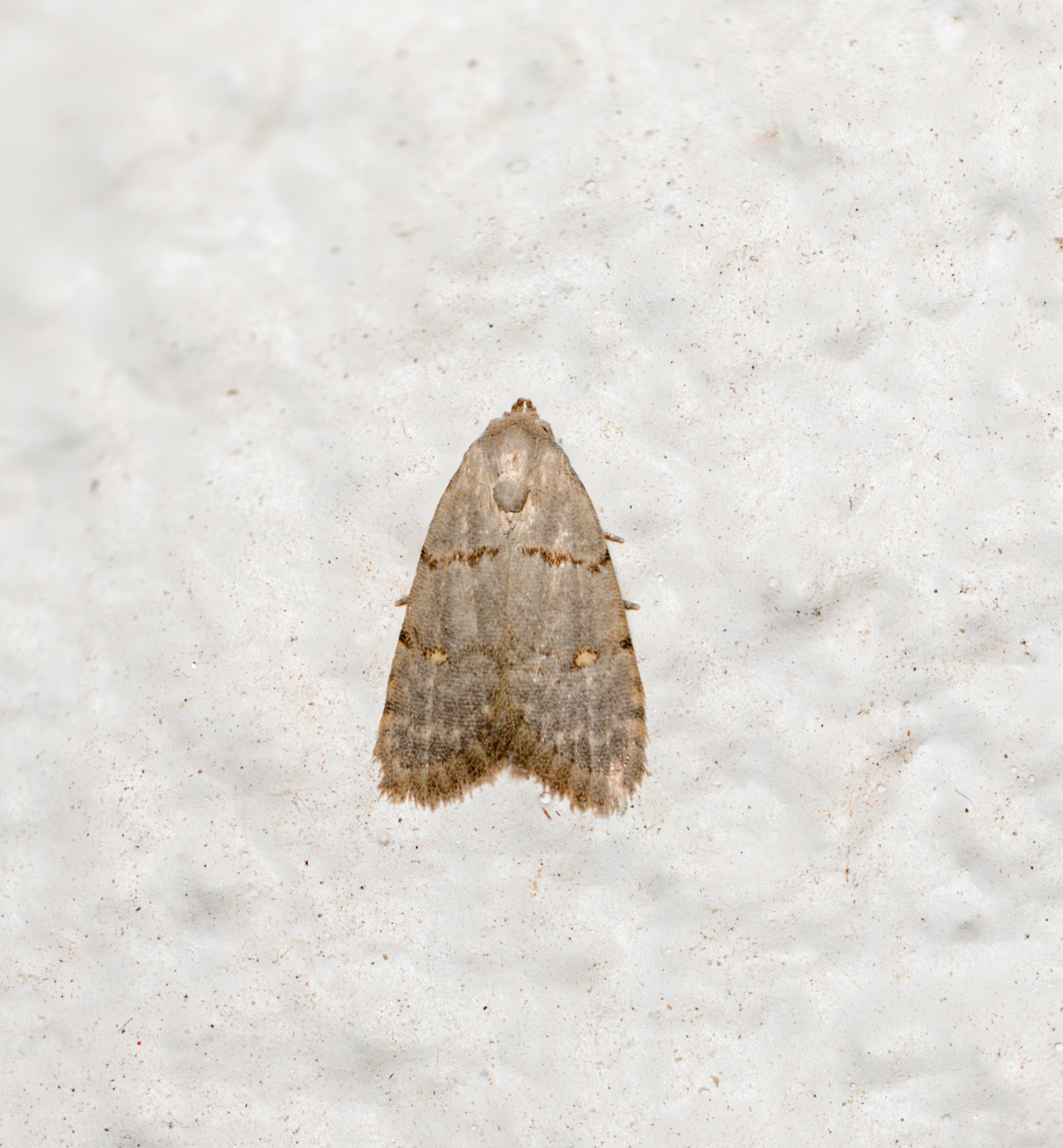
- Micronola wadicola

Scientific classification
- Kingdom: Animalia
- Phylum: Arthropoda
- Class: Insecta
- Order: Lepidoptera
- Superfamily: Noctuoidea
- Family: Erebidae
- Tribe: Micronoctuini
- Subtribe: Micronoctuina; Fibiger, 2005

Synonyms
- Micronoctuinae Fibiger, 2005

= Micronoctuina =

Subtribe of moths

The Micronoctuina are a subtribe of moths of the family Erebidae erected by Michael Fibiger in 2005.

== Taxonomy ==
The subtribe was originally described as the subfamily Micronoctuinae of the family Micronoctuidae.

== Genera ==
- Medius Fibiger, 2011
- Micronoctua Fibiger, 1997
- Micronola Amsel, 1935
- Sternitta Fibiger, 2011
