= Foreign market entry modes =

Ways a company can expand its services

In international trade, foreign market entry modes are the ways in which a company can expand its services into a non-domestic market.

There are two major types of market entry modes: equity and non-equity. The non-equity modes category includes export and contractual agreements. The equity modes category includes joint ventures and wholly owned subsidiaries. Different entry modes differ in three crucial aspects:

- The degree of risk they present.
- The control and commitment of resources they require.
- The return on investment they promise.

== Exporting ==
Exporting is the process of selling of goods and services produced in one country to other countries.

There are two types of exporting: direct and indirect.

=== Direct Exports ===
Passive exports represent the treating and filling overseas orders like domestic orders.

==== Types ====
Sales representatives
Sales representatives represent foreign suppliers/manufacturers in their local markets for an established commission on sales. Provide support services to a manufacturer regarding local advertising, local sales presentations, customs clearance formalities, legal requirements. Manufacturers of highly technical services or products such as production machinery, benefit the most from sales representation.

Importing distributors
Importing distributors purchase product in their own right and resell it in their local markets to wholesalers, retailers, or both. Importing distributors are a good market entry strategy for products that are carried in inventory, such as toys, appliances, prepared food.

==== Advantages ====
- Control over a selection of foreign markets and choice of foreign representative companies
- Good information feedback from target market, developing better relationships with the buyers
- Better protection of trademarks, patents, goodwill, and other intangible property
- Potentially greater sales, and therefore greater profit, than with indirect exporting.

==== Disadvantages ====
- Higher start-up costs and higher risks as opposed to indirect exporting
- Requires higher investments of time, resources and personnel and also organizational changes
- Greater information requirements
- Longer time-to-market as opposed to indirect exporting.

=== Indirect exports ===
Indirect export is the process of exporting through domestically based export intermediaries. The exporter has no control over its products in the foreign market.

==== Types ====
Export trading companies (ETCs)
These provide support services of the entire export process for one or more suppliers. Attractive to suppliers that are not familiar with exporting as ETCs usually perform all the necessary work: locate overseas trading partners, present the product, quote on specific enquiries, etc.

Export management companies (EMCs)
These are similar to ETCs in the way that they usually export for producers. Unlike ETCs, they rarely take on export credit risks and carry one type of product, not representing competing ones. Usually, EMCs trade on behalf of their suppliers as their export departments.

Export merchants
Export merchants are wholesale companies that buy unpackaged products from suppliers/manufacturers for resale overseas under their own brand names. The advantage of export merchants is promotion. One of the disadvantages for using export merchants result in presence of identical products under different brand names and pricing on the market, meaning that export merchant's activities may hinder manufacturer's exporting efforts.

Confirming houses
These are intermediate sellers that work for foreign buyers. They receive the product requirements from their clients, negotiate purchases, make delivery, and pay the suppliers/manufacturers. An opportunity here arises in the fact that if the client likes the product it may become a trade representative. A potential disadvantage includes supplier's unawareness and lack of control over what a confirming house does with their product.

Nonconforming purchasing agents
These are similar to confirming houses with the exception that they do not pay the suppliers directly – payments take place between a supplier/manufacturer and a foreign buyer.

==== Advantages ====
- Fast market access
- Concentration of resources towards production
- Little or no financial commitment as the clients' exports usually covers most expenses associated with international sales.
- Low risk exists for companies who consider their domestic market to be more important and for companies that are still developing their R&D, marketing, and sales strategies.
- Export management is outsourced, alleviating pressure from management team
- No direct handle of export processes.

==== Disadvantages ====
- Little or no control over distribution, sales, marketing, etc. as opposed to direct exporting
- Wrong choice of distributor, and by effect, market, may lead to inadequate market feedback affecting the international success of the company
- Potentially lower sales as compared to direct exporting (although low volume can be a key aspect of successfully exporting directly). Export partners that incorrectly select a specific distributor/market may hinder a firm's functional ability.

Companies that seriously consider international markets as a crucial part of their success would likely consider direct exporting as the market entry tool. Indirect exporting is preferred by companies who would want to avoid financial risk as a threat to their other goals.

== Licensing ==
An international licensing agreement allows foreign firms, either exclusively or non-exclusively to manufacture a proprietor's product for a fixed term in a specific market.

In this foreign market entry mode, a licensor in the home country makes limited rights or resources available to the licensee in the host country. The rights or resources may include patents, trademarks, managerial skills, technology, and others that can make it possible for the licensee to manufacture and sell in the host country a similar product to the one the licensor has already been producing and selling in the home country without requiring the licensor to open a new operation overseas. The licensor earnings usually take forms of one time payments, technical fees and royalty payments usually calculated as a percentage of sales.

As in this mode of entry the transference of knowledge between the parental company and the licensee is strongly present, the decision of making an international license agreement depend on the respect the host government show for intellectual property and on the ability of the licensor to choose the right partners and avoid them to compete in each other market. Licensing is a relatively flexible work agreement that can be customized to fit the needs and interests of both, licensor and licensee.

Following are the main advantages and reasons to use an international licensing for expanding internationally:

- Obtain extra income for technical know-how and services
- Reach new markets not accessible by export from existing facilities
- Quickly expand without much risk and large capital investment
- Pave the way for future investments in the market
- Retain established markets closed by trade restrictions
- Political risk is minimized as the licensee is usually 100% locally owned
- Is highly attractive for companies that are new in international business.

On the other hand, international licensing is a foreign market entry mode that presents some disadvantages and reasons why companies should not use it as:

- Lower income than in other entry modes
- Loss of control of the licensee manufacture and marketing operations and practices leading to loss of quality
- Risk of having the trademark and reputation ruined by an incompetent partner
- The foreign partner can also become a competitor by selling its production in places where the parental company is already in.

== Franchising ==
The franchising system can be defined as: "A system in which semi-independent business owners (franchisees) pay fees and royalties to a parent company (franchiser) in return for the right to become identified with its trademark, to sell its products or services, and often to use its business format and system."

Compared to licensing, franchising agreements tends to be longer and the franchisor offers a broader package of rights and resources which usually includes: equipment, managerial systems, operation manual, initial trainings, site approval and all the support necessary for the franchisee to run its business in the same way it is done by the franchisor. In addition to that, while a licensing agreement involves things such as intellectual property, trade secrets and others while in franchising it is limited to trademarks and operating know-how of the business.

Advantages of the international franchising mode:

- Low political risk
- Low cost
- Allows simultaneous expansion into different regions of the world
- Well selected partners bring financial investment as well as managerial capabilities to the operation.

Disadvantages of franchising to the franchisor:

- Maintaining control over franchisee may be difficult
- Conflicts with franchisee are likely, including legal disputes
- Preserving franchisor's image in the foreign market may be challenging
- Requires monitoring and evaluating performance of franchisees, and providing ongoing assistance
- Franchisees may take advantage of acquired knowledge and become competitors in the future

== Turnkey projects ==
A turnkey project refers to a project when clients pay contractors to design and construct new facilities and train personnel. A turnkey project is a way for a foreign company to export its process and technology to other countries by building a plant in that country. Industrial companies that specialize in complex production technologies normally use turnkey projects as an entry strategy.

One of the major advantages of turnkey projects is the possibility for a company to establish a plant and earn profits in a foreign country especially in which foreign direct investment opportunities are limited and lack of expertise in a specific area exists.

Potential disadvantages of a turnkey project for a company include risk of revealing companies secrets to rivals, and takeover of their plant by the host country. Entering a market with a turnkey project CAN prove that a company has no long-term interest in the country which can become a disadvantage if the country proves to be the main market for the output of the exported process.

== Wholly owned subsidiaries (WOS) ==
A wholly owned subsidiary includes two types of strategies: Greenfield investment and Acquisitions. Greenfield investment and acquisition include both advantages and disadvantages. To decide which entry modes to use is depending on situations.

Greenfield investment is the establishment of a new wholly owned subsidiary. It is often complex and potentially costly, but it is able to provide full control to the firm and has the most potential to provide above average return. "Wholly owned subsidiaries and expatriate staff are preferred in service industries where close contact with end customers and high levels of professional skills, specialized know how, and customization are required." Greenfield investment is more likely preferred where physical capital intensive plants are planned. This strategy is attractive if there are no competitors to buy or the transfer competitive advantages that consists of embedded competencies, skills, routines, and culture.

Greenfield investment is high risk due to the costs of establishing a new business in a new country. A firm may need to acquire knowledge and expertise of the existing market by third parties, such consultant, competitors, or business partners. This entry strategy takes much more time due to the need of establishing new operations, distribution networks, and the necessity to learn and implement appropriate marketing strategies to compete with rivals in a new market.

Acquisition has become a popular mode of entering foreign markets mainly due to its quick access Acquisition strategy offers the fastest, and the largest, initial international expansion of any of the alternative.

Acquisition has been increasing because it is a way to achieve greater market power. The market share usually is affected by market power. Therefore, many multinational corporations apply acquisitions to achieve their greater market power, which require buying a competitor, a supplier, a distributor, or a business in highly related industry to allow exercise of a core competency and capture competitive advantage in the market.

Acquisition is lower risk than Greenfield investment because of the outcomes of an acquisition can be estimated more easily and accurately. In overall, acquisition is attractive if there are well established firms already in operations or competitors want to enter the region.

On the other hand, there are many disadvantages and problems in achieving acquisition success.

- Integrating two organizations can be quite difficult due to different organization cultures, control system, and relationships. Integration is a complex issue, but it is one of the most important things for organizations.
- By applying acquisitions, some companies significantly increased their levels of debt which can have negative effects on the firms because high debt may cause bankruptcy.
- Too much diversification may cause problems. Even when a firm is not too over diversified, a high level of diversification can have a negative effect on the firm in the long-term performance due to a lack of management of diversification.

== Difference between international strategy and global strategy ==
However, some industries benefit more from globalization than do others, and some nations have a comparative advantage over other nations in certain industries. To create a successful global strategy, managers first must understand the nature of global industries and the dynamics of global competition, international strategy (i.e. internationally scattered subsidiaries act independently and operate as if they were local companies, with minimum coordination from the parent company) and global strategy (leads to a wide variety of business strategies, and a high level of adaptation to the local business environment). Basically there are three key differences between them. Firstly, it relates to the degree of involvement and coordination from the centre. Moreover, the difference relates to the degree of product standardization and responsiveness to local business environment. The last is that difference has to do with strategy integration and competitive moves.

== Joint venture ==
There are five common objectives in a joint venture: market entry, risk/reward sharing, technology sharing and joint product development, and conforming to the government regulations. Other benefits include political connections and distribution channel access that may depend on relationships. Such alliances often are favourable when:

- The partners' strategic goals converge while their competitive goals diverge
- The partners' size, market power, and resources are small compared to the Industry leaders
- Partners are able to learn from one another while limiting access to their own proprietary skills

The key issues to consider in a joint venture are ownership, control, length of agreement, pricing, technology transfer, local firm capabilities and resources, and government intentions. Potential problems include:

- Conflict over asymmetric new investments
- Mistrust over proprietary knowledge
- Performance ambiguity - how to split the pie
- Lack of parent firm support
- Cultural clashes
- If, how, and when to terminate the relationship

Joint ventures have conflicting pressures to cooperate and compete:

- Strategic imperative: the partners want to maximize the advantage gained for the joint venture, but they also want to maximize their own competitive position.
- The joint venture attempts to develop shared resources, but each firm wants to develop and protect its own proprietary resources.
- The joint venture is controlled through negotiations and coordination processes, while each firm would like to have hierarchical control.

== Strategic alliance ==
Strategic alliance is a type of cooperative agreements between different firms, such as shared research, formal joint ventures, or minority equity participation. The modern form of strategic alliances is becoming increasingly popular and has three distinguishing characteristics:

1. They are frequently between firms in industrialized nations.
2. The focus is often on creating new products and/or technologies rather than distributing existing ones.
3. They are often only created for short term duration, non equity based agreement in which companies are separated and are independent.

=== Advantages ===
Some advantages of a strategic alliance include:

Technology exchange
This is a major objective for many strategic alliances. The reason for this is that many breakthroughs and major technological innovations are based on interdisciplinary and/or inter-industrial advances. Because of this, it is increasingly difficult for a single firm to possess the necessary resources or capabilities to conduct their own effective R&D efforts. This is also perpetuated by shorter product life cycles and the need for many companies to stay competitive through innovation. Some industries that have become centers for extensive cooperative agreements are:
- Telecommunications
- Electronics
- Pharmaceuticals
- Information technology
- Specialty chemicals

Global competition
There is a growing perception that global battles between corporations be fought between teams of players aligned in strategic partnerships. Strategic alliances will become key tools for companies if they want to remain competitive in this globalized environment, particularly in industries that have dominant leaders, such as cell phone manufactures, where smaller companies need to ally in order to remain competitive.

Industry convergence
As industries converge and the traditional lines between different industrial sectors blur, strategic alliances are sometimes the only way to develop the complex skills necessary in the time frame required. Alliances become a way of shaping competition by decreasing competitive intensity, excluding potential entrants, and isolating players, and building complex value chains that can act as barriers.

Economies of scale and reduction of risk
Pooling resources can contribute greatly to economies of scale, and smaller companies especially can benefit greatly from strategic alliances in terms of cost reduction because of increased economies of scale.

In terms on risk reduction, in strategic alliances no one firm bears the full risk, and cost of, a joint activity. This is extremely advantageous to businesses involved in high risk / cost activities such as R&D. This is also advantageous to smaller organizations which are more affected by risky activities.

Alliance as an alternative to merger
Some industry sectors have constraints to cross-border mergers and acquisitions, strategic alliances prove to be an excellent alternative to bypass these constraints. Alliances often lead to full-scale integration if restrictions are lifted by one or both countries.

=== Risks of competitive collaboration ===
Some strategic alliances involve many firms that are in fierce competition outside the specific scope of the alliance. This creates the risk that one or both partners will try to use the alliance to create an advantage over the other. The benefits of this alliance may cause unbalance between the parties, there are several factors that may cause this asymmetry:

- The partnership may be forged to exchange resources and capabilities such as technology. This may cause one partner to obtain the desired technology and abandon the other partner, effectively appropriating all the benefits of the alliance.
- Using investment initiative to erode the other partners competitive position. This is a situation where one partner makes and keeps control of critical resources. This creates the threat that the stronger partner may strip the other of the necessary infrastructure.
- Strengths gained by learning from one company can be used against the other. As companies learn from the other, usually by task sharing, their capabilities become strengthened, sometimes this strength exceeds the scope of the venture and a company can use it to gain a competitive advantage against the company they may be working with.
- Firms may use alliances to acquire its partner. One firm may target a firm and ally with them to use the knowledge gained and trust built in the alliance to take over the other.

=== Disadvantages ===
1. Difficult to find a good partner
2. Risk of unequal partnership
3. Loss of control
4. Relationship management across borders

== Choosing a Partner for International Strategic Alliances ==
1. Strategic compatibility
  The partners need to have the same general goal and understanding in forming a joint venture. The differences in strategy produces more conflicts of interest in the later partnership (Lilley and Willianms, 1991).
2. Complementary skills and resources
  Another important criterion is that the partners need to contribute more than just money to the venture (Geringer and Michael, 1988). Each partner must contribute some skills and resources that complement for another.
3. Relative company size
  Different size of companies may cause domination of one firm or unequal agreement, which is not favourable for long-term running (Lilley and Willianms, 1991)
4. Financial capability
  The partners can generate sufficient financial resources to maintain the venture's efforts, which is also important for long-term partnership (Lilley and Willianms, 1991)

Some more like compatibility between operating policies (Lilley and Willianms, 1991), trust and commitment (Lilley and Willianms, 1991), compatible management styles (Geringer and Michael, 1988), mutual dependency (Lilley and Willianms, 1991), communications barriers (Lilley and Willianms, 1991) and avoid anchor partners (Geringer and Michael, 1988) are also important for partner selection but less important than the first four.

== Political Issues ==
Political issues will be faced mostly by the companies who want to enter a country that with unsustainable political environment (Parboteeah and Cullen, 2011). A political decisions will affect the business environment in a country and affect the profitability of the business in the country (Click, 2005). Organizations with investments in such opaque countries as Zimbabwe, Myanmar, and Vietnam have long-term experiences about how the political risk affects their business behaviors (Harvard Business Review, 2014).

The following are the examples of political issues:

1. The politically jailing of Mikhail Khodorkovsky, the business giant, in Russia (Wade, 2005); 2. The "Open-door" policy of China (Deng, 2001); 3. The Ukraine disputed elections resulting in the uncertain president recent years (Harvard Business Review, 2014); 4. The corrupt legal system in many countries, such as Russia (Samara, 2008)

== Three different rules of entry mode selection ==
The following introductions were based on the statement of Hollensen:

1. Naïve rule. The decision maker uses the same entry mode for all foreign markets. The companies use this rule as the entry mode selection ignore the differences of individual foreign markets. The performance of this selection could not be calculated, because it highly depends on the luck of the manager.
2. Pragmatic rule. The decision maker uses a workable entry mode for each foreign market, which means that the manager use different entry modes depend on the time stage or the business stage. For example, as the first step to international business, companies tend to use exporting.
3. Strategy rules. This approach means that the company systematically compared all of the entry modes and evaluated the value before any choice is made. This approach is common in large firms, because the research requires resources, capital and time. It is rarely to see a small or medium-sized company use this approach.

Besides these three rules, managers have their own ways to select entry modes. If the company could not generate a mature market research, the manager tend to choose the entry modes most suitable for the industry or make decisions by intuition.

== Case analysis of Foreign Direct Investment of Telecommunication Company in Albania ==
Foreign Direct Investment (FDI) is an important factor for a country's economic growth especially in its impacts on transmission of technology and developments in management and marketing strategies. FDI takes place when a firm acquires ownership control of a production unit in a foreign country.

According to the content there are basically three forms of FDI: establishing new branch, acquiring control share of an existing firm, and participating jointly in a domestic firm. As Albanian economy has changed from a centrally planned to a market oriented one, FDI is seen as an important component of the transition process toward a market-led economic system, since it contributes to the development of a country through multiple channels (Kukeli, et al., 2006; Kukeli, 2007). In their study, a limited number of successful mobile networks entry cases have been selected for deep investigation of entry models in Albania, to find out the most important and efficient determinants of foreign mobile networks entry into Albania's telecommunication market in the future as well. It provides a successful Albanian business experience for the newcomers in mobile telecommunications industry. With its developing market economy, Albania offers many opportunities for investors-property as labour costs are low, the young and educated population is ready to work, and tariffs and other legal restrictions are low in many cases and are being eliminated in some others (Albinvest, 2010). Location of Albania in itself offers a notable trade potential, especially with EU markets, since it shares borders with Greece and Italy. In the last years Albania has entered the free trade agreements with Balkan Countries creating the opportunity for trade throughout the region. As Albanian economy tends to grow, the prospects and opportunities of multinational enterprises (MNEs) to invest in Albania for a long-term period has increased also. However, after the transition to democracy since 1992, the country has taken a long way in terms of economic, political and social life (Ministry of Economy 2004, p. 9-10). Demirel (2008) finds all of these changes to form the strengths of Albania in terms of FDI. In his study Demirel (2008) emphasizes that Albania has one of the most friendly investment environments in the region of the South- Eastern European Countries (SEECs) with her impressive economic performance in the last decade, liberal economic legislation, rapid privatisation process and country specific advantages. By taking into account all of these factors, the aim of this study is to offer a new perspective by the case studies of foreign telecommunications companies, which form the majority of MNEs in this field, by finding the most significant determinants before entering into Albania, with a successful entry strategy and crucial consideration of FDI in Albania. It is crucially important to find the determinants and factors that affect multinational firms when deciding on their entry modes, in order to successfully compete in the Albanian mobile telecoms industry. There are four operators in these industries; two of the leading firms expand rapidly in Albania by utilizing successful and aggressive entry strategies, and the other ones are new entries in Albanian market. Lin (2008) emphasizes that the evaluation of the entry modes' determinants is better to be applied in some main theories and models such as transaction cost theory, eclectic theory and internationalization model, which serve as theoretical foundation in these kind of studies, where host-country condition, political and economic context, and organization capabilities are important factors and require major consideration.
