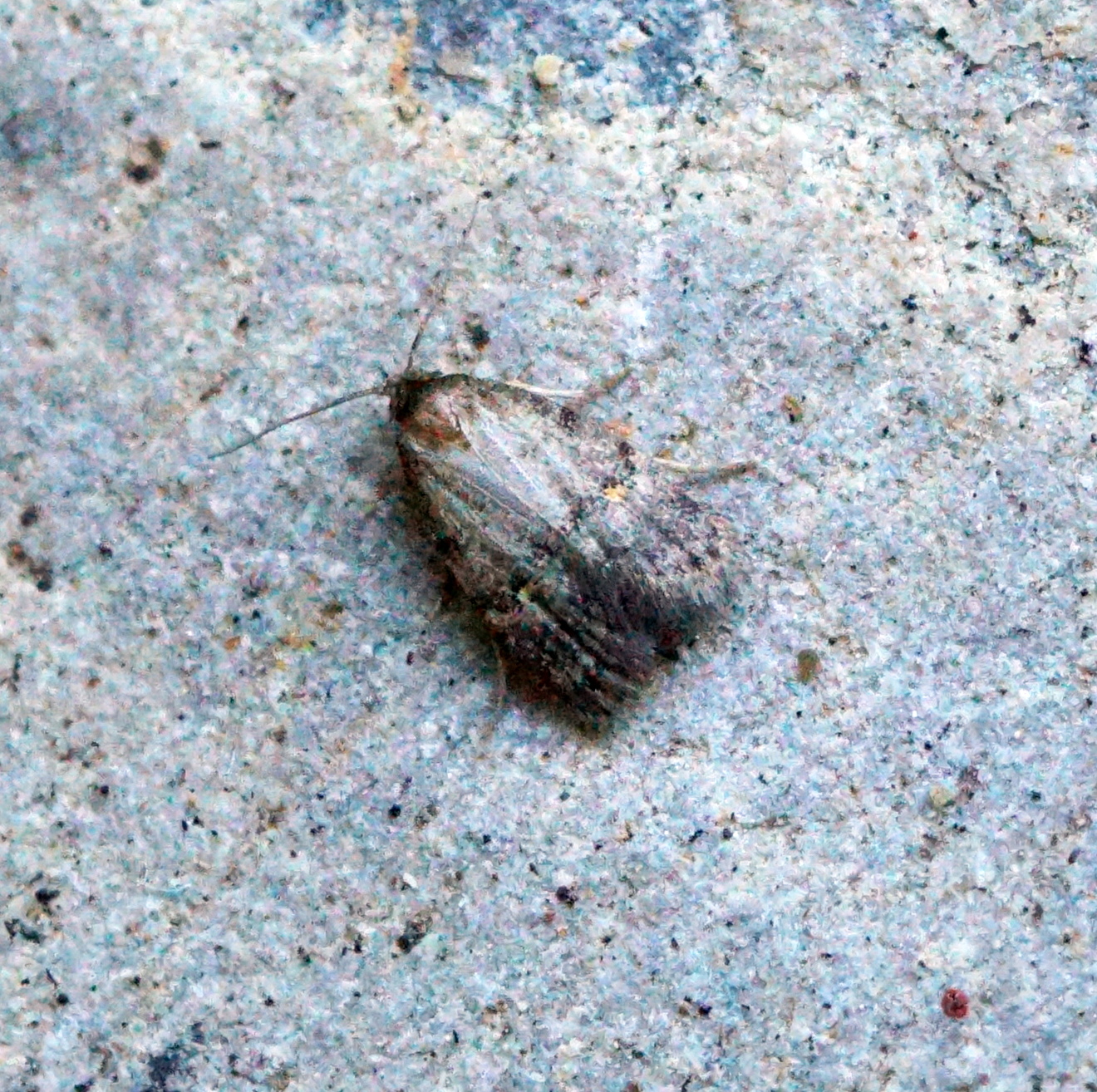

Scientific classification
- Domain: Eukaryota
- Kingdom: Animalia
- Phylum: Arthropoda
- Class: Insecta
- Order: Lepidoptera
- Superfamily: Noctuoidea
- Family: Erebidae
- Genus: Micronoctua; Fibiger, 1997
- Species: M. karsholti

Binomial name
- Micronoctua karsholti Fibiger, 1997

= Micronoctua =

Genus of moths

Micronoctua is a monotypic moth genus of the family Erebidae. Its only species, Micronoctua karsholti, is known from southern Turkey, Cyprus, the islands of south-east Greece, and the northern Levant (including Lebanon, Syria and Israel). Both the genus and the species were first described by Michael Fibiger in 1997.

It is the smallest of all species of the superfamily Noctuoidea.

The wingspan is 6–9 mm.

== Former species ==
- Micronoctua occi is now Parens occi (Fibiger & Kononenko, 2008)
