= Tentaspina =

Scientific classification
- Domain: Eukaryota
- Kingdom: Animalia
- Phylum: Arthropoda
- Class: Insecta
- Order: Lepidoptera
- Superfamily: Noctuoidea
- Family: Erebidae
- Subtribe: Tentaxina
- Genus: Tentaspina; Fibiger, 2011

Type species
- Tentaspina feriae Fibiger, 2011

Genus of moths

Tentaspina is a genus of moths of the family Erebidae. The genus was erected by Michael Fibiger in 2011.

== Species ==
- Tentaspina venus Fibiger, 2011
- Tentaspina duospina Fibiger, 2011
- Tentaspina feriae Fibiger, 2011
- Tentaspina balii Fibiger, 2011
- Tentaspina sinister Fibiger, 2011
- Tentaspina orienta Fibiger, 2011
- Tentaspina paraorienta Fibiger, 2011
