= Flax kuchingi =

Scientific classification
- Domain: Eukaryota
- Kingdom: Animalia
- Phylum: Arthropoda
- Class: Insecta
- Order: Lepidoptera
- Superfamily: Noctuoidea
- Family: Erebidae
- Genus: Flax
- Species: F. kuchingi

Binomial name
- Flax kuchingi Fibiger, 2011

Species of moth

Flax kuchingi is a moth of the family Erebidae first described by Michael Fibiger in 2011. It is found on Borneo (it was described from Sarawak).

The wingspan is about 11 mm. The labial palps, head, patagia, tegulae and thorax are grey brown, suffused with dark-brown scales. The ground colour of the forewings (including fringes) is grey brown. The base of the costa is grey brown with black scales. There is a rather indistinct dark brown quadrangular patch in the upper medial area, with a black dot in the inner dorsal area. The crosslines are brown, outlined in beige, except for the terminal line which is only indicated by black-brown interveinal dots. The hindwings are grey. The underside of the forewings is unicolorous brown and the underside of the hindwings is grey with a discal spot.
