= Flax tamborai =

Scientific classification
- Domain: Eukaryota
- Kingdom: Animalia
- Phylum: Arthropoda
- Class: Insecta
- Order: Lepidoptera
- Superfamily: Noctuoidea
- Family: Erebidae
- Genus: Flax
- Species: F. tamborai

Binomial name
- Flax tamborai Fibiger, 2011

Species of moth

Flax tamborai is a moth of the family Erebidae first described by Michael Fibiger in 2011. It is found in Indonesia (it was described from Mount Tambora on Sumbawa).

The wingspan is 10.5–12 mm.
