= Micronola irani =

Scientific classification
- Domain: Eukaryota
- Kingdom: Animalia
- Phylum: Arthropoda
- Class: Insecta
- Order: Lepidoptera
- Superfamily: Noctuoidea
- Family: Erebidae
- Genus: Micronola
- Species: M. irani

Binomial name
- Micronola irani Fibiger, 2011

Species of moth

Micronola irani is a moth of the family Erebidae first described by Michael Fibiger in 2011. It is found in the mountains of western and southern Iran. The habitat consists of open Artemisia steppe.

The wingspan is 7–9 mm.
