= Parens chekiangi =

Scientific classification
- Domain: Eukaryota
- Kingdom: Animalia
- Phylum: Arthropoda
- Class: Insecta
- Order: Lepidoptera
- Superfamily: Noctuoidea
- Family: Erebidae
- Genus: Parens
- Species: P. chekiangi

Binomial name
- Parens chekiangi Fibiger, 2011

Species of moth

Parens chekiangi is a moth of the family Erebidae first described by Michael Fibiger in 2011. It can be found in China, described as from Zhejiang by Fibiger.

The wingspan is about 9.5mm.
