= Tentaspina duospina =

Scientific classification
- Domain: Eukaryota
- Kingdom: Animalia
- Phylum: Arthropoda
- Class: Insecta
- Order: Lepidoptera
- Superfamily: Noctuoidea
- Family: Erebidae
- Genus: Tentaspina
- Species: T. duospina

Binomial name
- Tentaspina duospina Fibiger, 2011

Species of moth

Tentaspina duospina is a moth of the family Erebidae first described by Michael Fibiger in 2011. It is found on the Philippines (it was described from Leyte Island).

The wingspan is about 11 mm.
