= Flax kalliesi =

Scientific classification
- Domain: Eukaryota
- Kingdom: Animalia
- Phylum: Arthropoda
- Class: Insecta
- Order: Lepidoptera
- Superfamily: Noctuoidea
- Family: Erebidae
- Genus: Flax
- Species: F. kalliesi

Binomial name
- Flax kalliesi Fibiger, 2011

Species of moth

Flax kalliesi is a moth of the family Erebidae first described by Michael Fibiger in 2011. It is found in the south-east of East Timor and in Australia's Northern Territory.

Its wingspan is 9–10 mm. The ground colour of the forewings (including fringes) is dark brown, although the base of the costa is black brown. There is a black-brown quadrangular patch in the upper medial area, with a black dot in the inner lower area. The crosslines are indistinct and brown, outlined in beige. The terminal line is only indicated by black interveinal dots. The hindwings are grey. The underside of the forewings is unicolorous brown and the underside of the hindwings is grey with a discal spot.
