= Country risk =

Risk of investing or lending in a country

Country risk refers to the risk of investing or lending in a country, arising from possible changes in the business environment that may adversely affect operating profits or the value of assets in the country. For example, financial factors such as currency controls, devaluation or regulatory changes, or stability factors such as mass riots, civil war and other potential events contribute to companies' operational risks. This term is also sometimes referred to as political risk; however, country risk is a more general term that generally refers only to risks influencing all companies operating within or involved with a particular country.

Political risk analysis providers and credit rating agencies use different methodologies to assess and rate countries' comparative risk exposure. Credit rating agencies tend to use quantitative econometric models and focus on financial analysis, whereas political risk providers tend to use qualitative methods, focusing on political analysis. However, there is no consensus on methodology in assessing credit and political risks.

== Ratings ==
Higher scores in this table indicate less risky countries.

Country risk rankings Q4 2017The least-risky countries for investment
Rank	Rank change	Country	Overall score
1	—	Singapore	88.6
2	—	Norway	87.66
3	—	Switzerland	87.64
4	—	Denmark	85.67
5	▲2	Sweden	85.59
6	▼1	Luxembourg	83.85
7	▼1	Netherlands	83.76
8	▲4	Finland	83.1
9	—	Canada	82.98
10	▲1	Australia	82.18
Score out of 100. Rank change to previous quarter. Source: Euromoney Country Risk - published January 2018.

Ratings are further broken down into components including political risk and economic risk. Euromoney's quarterly country risk index “Country Risk Survey” monitors the political and economic stability of 185 sovereign countries. Results focus foremost on economics, specifically sovereign default risk and/or payment default risk for exporters (a.k.a. “trade credit” risk).

== Partial list of credit risk rating agencies ==
- Fitch Ratings (U.S.)
- Moody's (U.S.)
- Standard & Poor's (U.S.)
- CTRISKS (Greater China)

== Partial list of political risk analysis organizations ==
- Euromoney Country Risk, ECR
- IHS Country Risk
- BMI Research
- Country Risk Solutions
- Economist Intelligence Unit
- Eurasia Group
- Maplecroft
- Oxford Analytica
- The PRS Group, Inc.

== See also ==
- National average salary
- Offshoring
- Workforce productivity
- Emerging Markets Index (MSCI) (for the equity risk premium of a country stock market)
- Emerging Market Bond Index (EMBI) (for the debt risk premium of a country bond market)
- Bond credit rating (another metric for the debt risk premium of a country bond market)
- Credit rating (for the sovereign credit risk premium of a country CDS market)
- Credit rating agency
- List of countries by natural disaster risk
