= Medius =

Scientific classification
- Domain: Eukaryota
- Kingdom: Animalia
- Phylum: Arthropoda
- Class: Insecta
- Order: Lepidoptera
- Superfamily: Noctuoidea
- Family: Erebidae
- Subtribe: Micronoctuina
- Genus: Medius; Fibiger, 2011

Genus of moths

Medius is a genus of moths of the family Erebidae erected by Michael Fibiger in 2011.

== Species ==
- Medius calceus Fibiger, 2011
- Medius khasisiodes Fibiger, 2011
- Medius brassi Fibiger, 2011
- Medius nepali Fibiger, 2011
- Medius unguisi Fibiger, 2011
- Medius kalimantani Fibiger, 2011
