= Micronola yemeni =

Scientific classification
- Kingdom: Animalia
- Phylum: Arthropoda
- Class: Insecta
- Order: Lepidoptera
- Superfamily: Noctuoidea
- Family: Erebidae
- Genus: Micronola
- Species: M. yemeni

Binomial name
- Micronola yemeni Fibiger, 2011

Species of moth

Micronola yemeni is a moth of the family Erebidae first described by Michael Fibiger in 2011. It is found in Yemen, Tanzania and Nigeria.

The wingspan is 8.5–11 mm.

== Subspecies ==
- Micronola yemeni yemeni Fibiger, 2011 (Yemen and Tanzania)
- Micronola yemeni occidentalis Fibiger, 2011 (Nigeria)
