= Sternitta gabori =

Scientific classification
- Domain: Eukaryota
- Kingdom: Animalia
- Phylum: Arthropoda
- Class: Insecta
- Order: Lepidoptera
- Superfamily: Noctuoidea
- Family: Erebidae
- Genus: Sternitta
- Species: S. gabori

Binomial name
- Sternitta gabori Fibiger, 2011

Species of moth

Sternitta gabori is a moth of the family Erebidae first described by Michael Fibiger in 2011. It is found in northern India, Pakistan, Afghanistan and north-central Iran.

The wingspan is 8.5–12 mm.
