= Flax lueneborgi =

Scientific classification
- Domain: Eukaryota
- Kingdom: Animalia
- Phylum: Arthropoda
- Class: Insecta
- Order: Lepidoptera
- Superfamily: Noctuoidea
- Family: Erebidae
- Genus: Flax
- Species: F. lueneborgi

Binomial name
- Flax lueneborgi Fibiger, 2011

Species of moth

Flax lueneborgi is a moth of the family Erebidae first described by Michael Fibiger in 2011. It is found in Papua New Guinea (it was described from Dyaul Island within the Bismarck Islands).

== Description ==
The wingspan is 7.5–10 mm (0.30–0.39 in).

All known specimens have been collected in malaise traps near Sumuna, a small village within a primary forest.
