= Flax fulturai =

Scientific classification
- Domain: Eukaryota
- Kingdom: Animalia
- Phylum: Arthropoda
- Class: Insecta
- Order: Lepidoptera
- Superfamily: Noctuoidea
- Family: Erebidae
- Genus: Flax
- Species: F. fulturai

Binomial name
- Flax fulturai Fibiger, 2011

Species of moth

Flax fulturai is a moth of the family Erebidae first described by Michael Fibiger in 2011. It is found on Guadalcanal in the Solomon Islands.

The wingspan is about 10 mm.
