= Flax brevipennis =

Scientific classification
- Domain: Eukaryota
- Kingdom: Animalia
- Phylum: Arthropoda
- Class: Insecta
- Order: Lepidoptera
- Superfamily: Noctuoidea
- Family: Erebidae
- Genus: Flax
- Species: F. brevipennis

Binomial name
- Flax brevipennis Fibiger, 2011

Species of moth

Flax brevipennis is a moth of the family Erebidae first described by Michael Fibiger in 2011. It is found in Indonesia (western Sumatra).

The wingspan is 10–11 mm.
