= Micronola zahirii =

Scientific classification
- Domain: Eukaryota
- Kingdom: Animalia
- Phylum: Arthropoda
- Class: Insecta
- Order: Lepidoptera
- Superfamily: Noctuoidea
- Family: Erebidae
- Genus: Micronola
- Species: M. zahirii

Binomial name
- Micronola zahirii Fibiger, 2011

Species of moth

Micronola zahirii is a moth of the family Erebidae first described by Michael Fibiger in 2011. It is found in western Iran and western Azerbaijan.

The wingspan is about 10.5 mm.
