= Sternitta hackeri =

Scientific classification
- Domain: Eukaryota
- Kingdom: Animalia
- Phylum: Arthropoda
- Class: Insecta
- Order: Lepidoptera
- Superfamily: Noctuoidea
- Family: Erebidae
- Genus: Sternitta
- Species: S. hackeri

Binomial name
- Sternitta hackeri Fibiger, 2011

Species of moth

Sternitta hackeri is a moth of the family Erebidae first described by Michael Fibiger in 2011. It is found in northern Pakistan.
