= Flax micronesia =

Scientific classification
- Domain: Eukaryota
- Kingdom: Animalia
- Phylum: Arthropoda
- Class: Insecta
- Order: Lepidoptera
- Superfamily: Noctuoidea
- Family: Erebidae
- Genus: Flax
- Species: F. micronesia

Binomial name
- Flax micronesia Fibiger, 2011

Species of moth

Flax micronesia is a moth of the family Erebidae first described by Michael Fibiger in 2011. It is found in Micronesia (it was described from Babelthuap Island in Palau).

The wingspan is about 10 mm.
