= Flax basis =

Scientific classification
- Domain: Eukaryota
- Kingdom: Animalia
- Phylum: Arthropoda
- Class: Insecta
- Order: Lepidoptera
- Superfamily: Noctuoidea
- Family: Erebidae
- Genus: Flax
- Species: F. basis

Binomial name
- Flax basis Fibiger, 2011

Species of moth

Flax basis is a moth of the family Erebidae first described by Michael Fibiger in 2011. It is found in Laos (Vientiane), in Southeast Asia.
