= Tentaspina paraorienta =

Scientific classification
- Domain: Eukaryota
- Kingdom: Animalia
- Phylum: Arthropoda
- Class: Insecta
- Order: Lepidoptera
- Superfamily: Noctuoidea
- Family: Erebidae
- Genus: Tentaspina
- Species: T. paraorienta

Binomial name
- Tentaspina paraorienta Fibiger, 2011

Species of moth

Tentaspina paraorienta is a moth of the family Erebidae first described by Michael Fibiger in 2011. It is found in Indonesia (it was described from western Java).

The wingspan is about 11 mm.
