= Flax (moth) =

Scientific classification
- Domain: Eukaryota
- Kingdom: Animalia
- Phylum: Arthropoda
- Class: Insecta
- Order: Lepidoptera
- Superfamily: Noctuoidea
- Family: Erebidae
- Subtribe: Tentaxina
- Genus: Flax; Fibiger, 2011

Genus of moths

Flax is a genus of moths of the family Erebidae. It was described by Michael Fibiger in 2011.

== Species ==
- Flax basis Fibiger, 2011
- Flax amita Fibiger, 2011
- Flax clavus Fibiger, 2011
- Flax poseidon Fibiger, 2011
- Flax tempuensis Fibiger, 2011
- Flax neptun Fibiger, 2011
- Flax brevipennis Fibiger, 2011
- Flax bibrevipennis Fibiger, 2011
- Flax serami Fibiger, 2011
- Flax tamborai Fibiger, 2011
- Flax kuchingi Fibiger, 2011
- Flax sulawesii Fibiger, 2011
- Flax kalliesi Fibiger, 2011
- Flax longus Fibiger, 2011
- Flax semilongus Fibiger, 2011
- Flax micronesia Fibiger, 2011
- Flax palaui Fibiger, 2011
- Flax biaki Fibiger, 2011
- Flax newirlandi Fibiger, 2011
- Flax lueneborgi Fibiger, 2011
- Flax newbritaini Fibiger, 2011
- Flax honeyi Fibiger, 2011
- Flax fulturai Fibiger, 2011
- Flax fletcheri Fibiger, 2011
- Flax solomoni Fibiger, 2011
- Flax sanchristobali Fibiger, 2011
- Flax elachista (D. S. Fletcher, 1957)
- Flax rennelli Fibiger, 2011
- Flax vanuatui Fibiger, 2011
