= Sternitta =

Scientific classification
- Domain: Eukaryota
- Kingdom: Animalia
- Phylum: Arthropoda
- Class: Insecta
- Order: Lepidoptera
- Superfamily: Noctuoidea
- Family: Erebidae
- Subfamily: Hypenodinae
- Tribe: Micronoctuini
- Subtribe: Micronoctuina
- Genus: Sternitta; Fibiger, 2011

Genus of moths

Sternitta is a genus of moths of the family Erebidae erected by Michael Fibiger in 2011.

== Species ==
- Sternitta gabori Fibiger, 2011
- Sternitta goateri Fibiger, 2011
- Sternitta gregerseni Fibiger, 2011
- Sternitta hackeri Fibiger, 2011
- Sternitta magna Fibiger, 2011
- Sternitta parasuffuscalis Fibiger, 2011
- Sternitta suffuscalis (Swinhoe, 1886)
