= Parens melli =

Scientific classification
- Domain: Eukaryota
- Kingdom: Animalia
- Phylum: Arthropoda
- Class: Insecta
- Order: Lepidoptera
- Superfamily: Noctuoidea
- Family: Erebidae
- Genus: Parens
- Species: P. melli

Binomial name
- Parens melli Fibiger, 2011

Species of moth

Parens melli is a moth of the family Erebidae first described by Michael Fibiger in 2011. It is found in China (it was described from Fusan).

The wingspan is about 10 mm.
