= Flax solomoni =

Scientific classification
- Domain: Eukaryota
- Kingdom: Animalia
- Phylum: Arthropoda
- Class: Insecta
- Order: Lepidoptera
- Superfamily: Noctuoidea
- Family: Erebidae
- Genus: Flax
- Species: F. solomoni

Binomial name
- Flax solomoni Fibiger, 2011

Species of moth

Flax solomoni is a moth of the family Erebidae first described by Michael Fibiger in 2011. It is found on the Solomon Islands (it was described from north-western Guadalcanal).

The wingspan is about 10 mm.
