= Flax elachista =

Scientific classification
- Domain: Eukaryota
- Kingdom: Animalia
- Phylum: Arthropoda
- Class: Insecta
- Order: Lepidoptera
- Superfamily: Noctuoidea
- Family: Erebidae
- Genus: Flax
- Species: F. elachista

Binomial name
- Flax elachista (D. S. Fletcher, 1957)

Synonyms
- Anachrostis elachista D. S. Fletcher, 1957

Species of moth

Flax elachista is a moth of the family Erebidae. It was described by David Stephen Fletcher in 1957. It is found on Rennell Island in the Solomon Islands.

The wingspan is about 9 mm.
