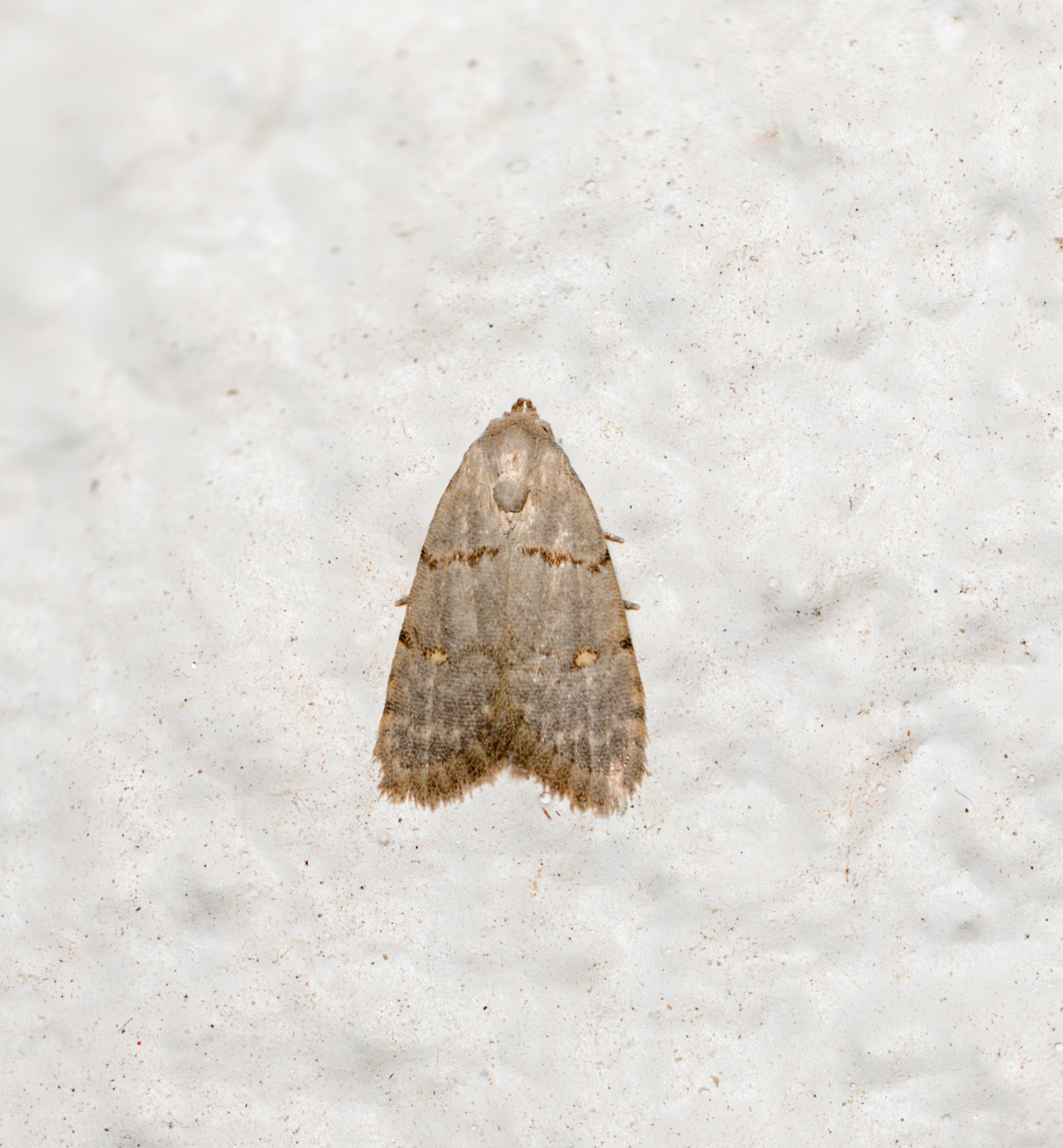

Scientific classification
- Kingdom: Animalia
- Phylum: Arthropoda
- Class: Insecta
- Order: Lepidoptera
- Superfamily: Noctuoidea
- Family: Erebidae
- Genus: Micronola
- Species: M. wadicola

Binomial name
- Micronola wadicola Amsel, 1935

= Micronola wadicola =

Species of moth

Micronola wadicola is a moth of the family Erebidae first described by Hans Georg Amsel in 1935. It is found in Jordan, south-western Iran, south-western Saudi Arabia, Oman and Yemen.

The wingspan is 9–13 mm.
