= Sternitta suffuscalis =

Scientific classification
- Kingdom: Animalia
- Phylum: Arthropoda
- Clade: Pancrustacea
- Class: Insecta
- Order: Lepidoptera
- Superfamily: Noctuoidea
- Family: Erebidae
- Genus: Sternitta
- Species: S. suffuscalis

Binomial name
- Sternitta suffuscalis (Swinhoe, 1886)

Synonyms
- Nephopteryx suffuscalis Swinhoe, 1886

Species of moth

Sternitta suffuscalis is a moth of the family Erebidae first described by Charles Swinhoe in 1886. It is found from central India to the south of Sri Lanka. The wingspan is 9–11 mm.

== Taxonomy ==
The species was originally described in the family Pyralidae.
