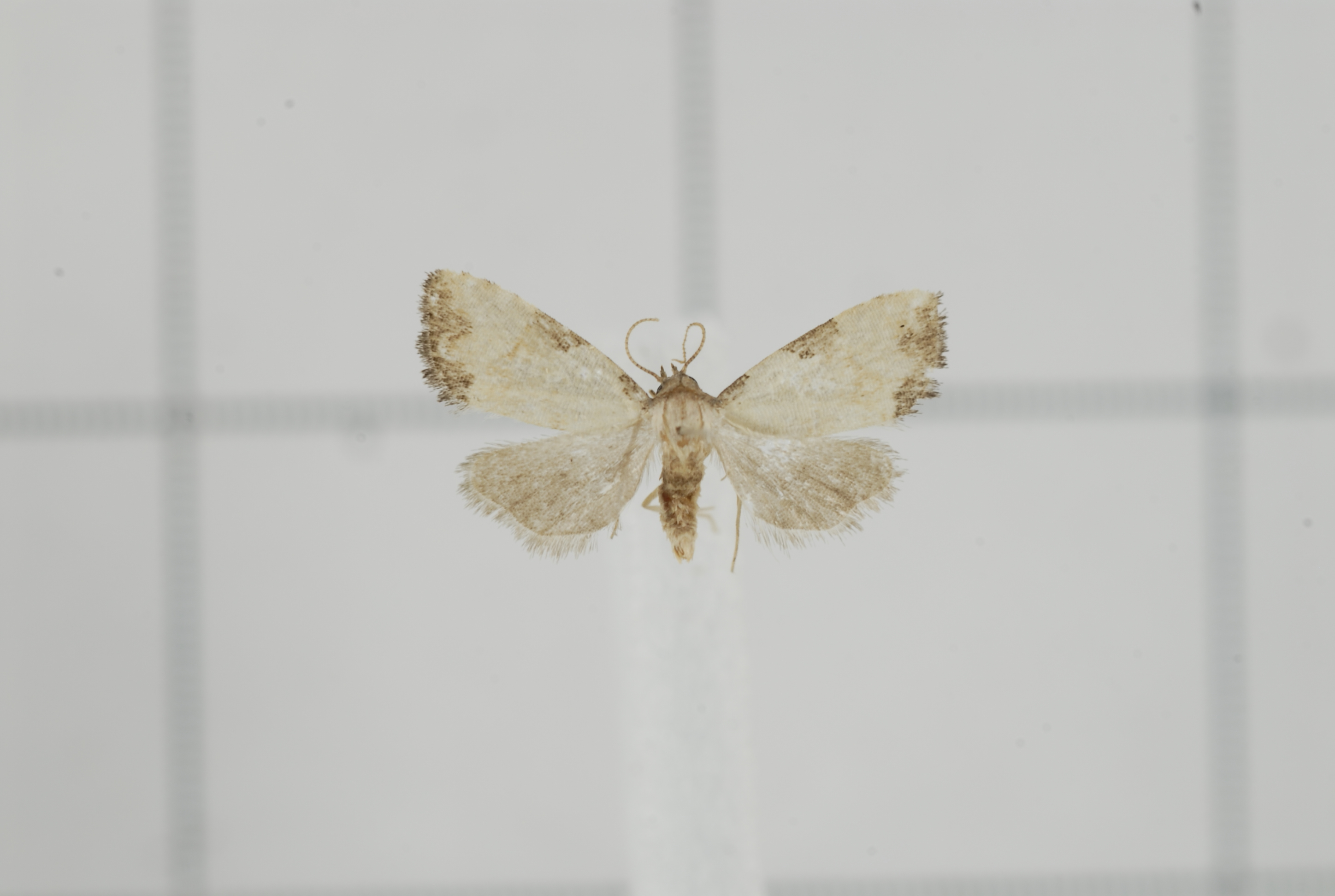

Scientific classification
- Domain: Eukaryota
- Kingdom: Animalia
- Phylum: Arthropoda
- Class: Insecta
- Order: Lepidoptera
- Superfamily: Noctuoidea
- Family: Erebidae
- Genus: Parens
- Species: P. paraocci

Binomial name
- Parens paraocci Fibiger, 2011

= Parens paraocci =

Species of moth

Parens paraocci is a moth of the family Erebidae first described by Michael Fibiger in 2011. It is found in Taiwan.

The wingspan is 9 to 13 millimetres (0.90 to 1.30 cm).
