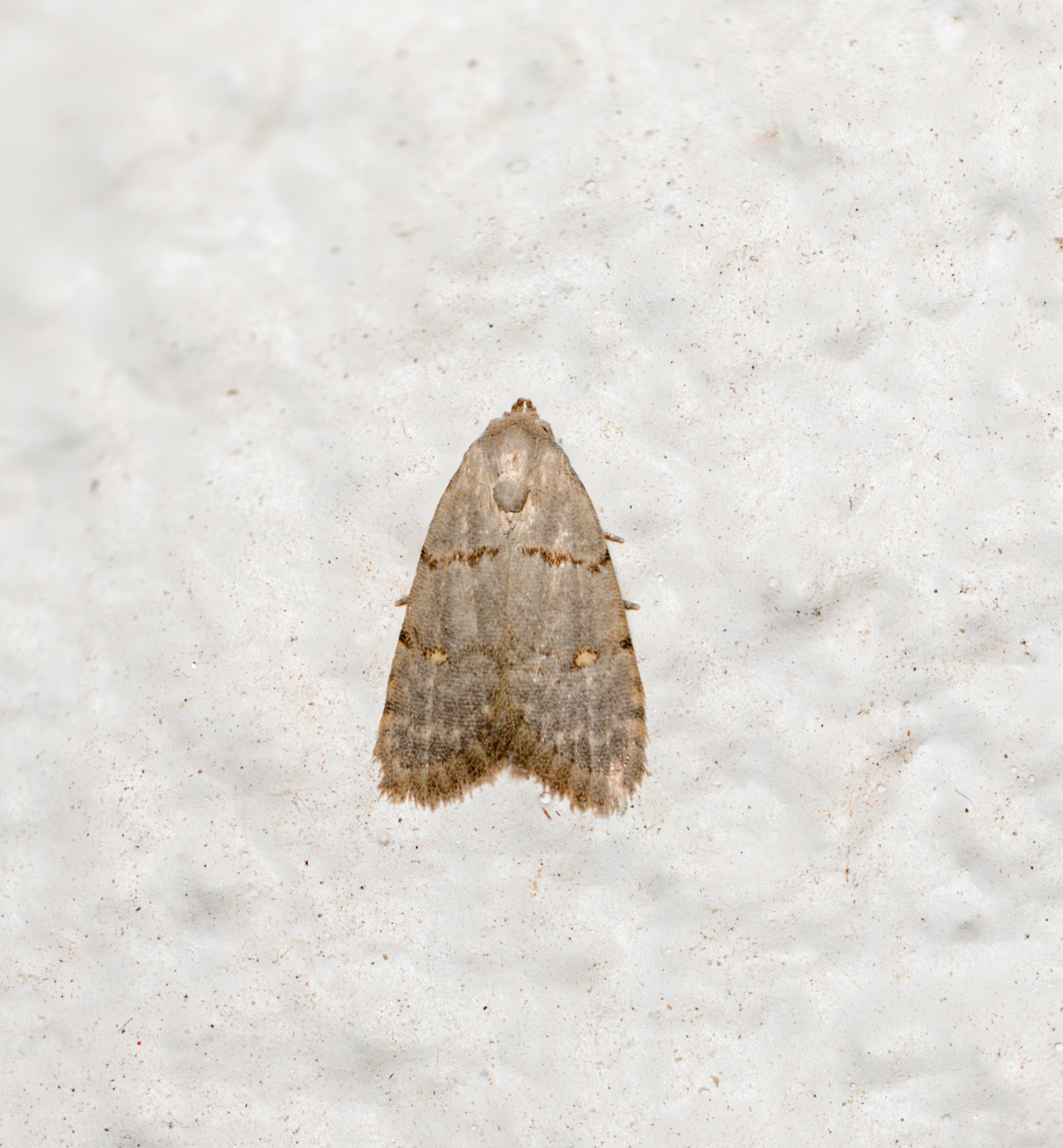
- Micronola wadicola

Scientific classification
- Kingdom: Animalia
- Phylum: Arthropoda
- Class: Insecta
- Order: Lepidoptera
- Superfamily: Noctuoidea
- Family: Erebidae
- Subtribe: Micronoctuina
- Genus: Micronola; Amsel, 1935

= Micronola =

Genus of moths

Micronola is a genus of moths of the family Erebidae. The genus was erected by Amsel in 1935.

== Species ==
- Micronola wadicola Amsel, 1935
- Micronola yemeni Fibiger, 2011
- Micronola zahirii Fibiger, 2011
- Micronola irani Fibiger, 2011

== Taxonomy ==
The genus was originally placed in the family Nolidae.
