= Flax vanuatui =

Scientific classification
- Domain: Eukaryota
- Kingdom: Animalia
- Phylum: Arthropoda
- Class: Insecta
- Order: Lepidoptera
- Superfamily: Noctuoidea
- Family: Erebidae
- Genus: Flax
- Species: F. vanuatui

Binomial name
- Flax vanuatui Fibiger, 2011

Species of moth

Flax vanuatui is a moth of the family Erebidae first described by Michael Fibiger in 2011. It is found in Vanuatu, where it was described from Espiritu Santo.

The wingspan is 8-8.5 mm.
