= Flax sanchristobali =

Scientific classification
- Domain: Eukaryota
- Kingdom: Animalia
- Phylum: Arthropoda
- Class: Insecta
- Order: Lepidoptera
- Superfamily: Noctuoidea
- Family: Erebidae
- Genus: Flax
- Species: F. sanchristobali

Binomial name
- Flax sanchristobali Fibiger, 2011

Species of moth

Flax sanchristobali is a moth of the family Erebidae first described by Michael Fibiger in 2011. It is found on the Solomon Islands (it was described from central Makira).

The wingspan is 9–9.5 mm.
