= Flax bibrevipennis =

Scientific classification
- Domain: Eukaryota
- Kingdom: Animalia
- Phylum: Arthropoda
- Class: Insecta
- Order: Lepidoptera
- Superfamily: Noctuoidea
- Family: Erebidae
- Genus: Flax
- Species: F. bibrevipennis

Binomial name
- Flax bibrevipennis Fibiger, 2011

Species of moth

Flax bibrevipennis is a moth of the family Erebidae first described by Michael Fibiger in 2011. It is found on Borneo (it was described from Sarawak).

The wingspan is 9-9.5 mm.
