= Flax honeyi =

Scientific classification
- Domain: Eukaryota
- Kingdom: Animalia
- Phylum: Arthropoda
- Class: Insecta
- Order: Lepidoptera
- Superfamily: Noctuoidea
- Family: Erebidae
- Genus: Flax
- Species: F. honeyi

Binomial name
- Flax honeyi Fibiger, 2011

Species of moth

Flax honeyi is a moth of the family Erebidae first described by Michael Fibiger in 2011. It is found on the Solomon Islands (it was described from Santa Isabel Island).

The wingspan is about 9 mm.
