= Flax newirlandi =

Scientific classification
- Domain: Eukaryota
- Kingdom: Animalia
- Phylum: Arthropoda
- Class: Insecta
- Order: Lepidoptera
- Superfamily: Noctuoidea
- Family: Erebidae
- Genus: Flax
- Species: F. newirlandi

Binomial name
- Flax newirlandi Fibiger, 2011

Species of moth

Flax newirlandi is a moth of the family Erebidae first described by Michael Fibiger in 2011. It is found in Papua New Guinea (it was described from the Bismarck Islands, near the centre of New Ireland).

The wingspan is about 9 mm.

The only known specimen was collected in a clearing near the village of Lemkamin, which is surrounded by primary forest.
