= Sternitta parasuffuscalis =

Scientific classification
- Domain: Eukaryota
- Kingdom: Animalia
- Phylum: Arthropoda
- Class: Insecta
- Order: Lepidoptera
- Superfamily: Noctuoidea
- Family: Erebidae
- Genus: Sternitta
- Species: S. parasuffuscalis

Binomial name
- Sternitta parasuffuscalis Fibiger, 2011

Species of moth

Sternitta parasuffuscalis is a moth of the family Erebidae first described by Michael Fibiger in 2011. It is found in southern India (it was described from Thalassery).

== Description ==
The wingspan is about 11 mm.
