= Flax biaki =

Scientific classification
- Domain: Eukaryota
- Kingdom: Animalia
- Phylum: Arthropoda
- Class: Insecta
- Order: Lepidoptera
- Superfamily: Noctuoidea
- Family: Erebidae
- Genus: Flax
- Species: F. biaki

Binomial name
- Flax biaki Fibiger, 2011

Species of moth

Flax biaki is a moth of the family Erebidae first described by Michael Fibiger in 2011. It is found in Indonesia (it was described from Biak Island, Western New Guinea).

The wingspan is about 9 mm.
