= Tentaspina orienta =

Scientific classification
- Domain: Eukaryota
- Kingdom: Animalia
- Phylum: Arthropoda
- Class: Insecta
- Order: Lepidoptera
- Superfamily: Noctuoidea
- Family: Erebidae
- Genus: Tentaspina
- Species: T. orienta

Binomial name
- Tentaspina orienta Fibiger, 2011

Species of moth

Tentaspina orienta is a moth of the family Erebidae first described by Michael Fibiger in 2011. It is found in Indonesia (it was described from eastern Java).

The wingspan is about 11 mm.
