= Flax sulawesii =

Scientific classification
- Domain: Eukaryota
- Kingdom: Animalia
- Phylum: Arthropoda
- Class: Insecta
- Order: Lepidoptera
- Superfamily: Noctuoidea
- Family: Erebidae
- Genus: Flax
- Species: F. sulawesii

Binomial name
- Flax sulawesii Fibiger, 2011

Species of moth

Flax sulawesii is a moth of the family Erebidae first described by Michael Fibiger in 2011. It is found in Indonesia (it was described from North Sulawesi).

The wingspan is about 11 mm.
