= Medius calceus =

Scientific classification
- Domain: Eukaryota
- Kingdom: Animalia
- Phylum: Arthropoda
- Class: Insecta
- Order: Lepidoptera
- Superfamily: Noctuoidea
- Family: Erebidae
- Genus: Medius
- Species: M. calceus

Binomial name
- Medius calceus Fibiger, 2011

Species of moth

Medius calceus is a moth of the family Erebidae first described by Michael Fibiger in 2011. It is found in Nepal (it was described from the Kathmandu Valley).

The wingspan is 11.5–14 mm.
