= Flax semilongus =

Scientific classification
- Domain: Eukaryota
- Kingdom: Animalia
- Phylum: Arthropoda
- Class: Insecta
- Order: Lepidoptera
- Superfamily: Noctuoidea
- Family: Erebidae
- Genus: Flax
- Species: F. semilongus

Binomial name
- Flax semilongus Fibiger, 2011

Species of moth

Flax semilongus is a moth of the family Erebidae first described by Michael Fibiger in 2011. It is found in the Philippines (Palawan).

The wingspan is about 10 mm.
