= Flax newbritaini =

Scientific classification
- Domain: Eukaryota
- Kingdom: Animalia
- Phylum: Arthropoda
- Class: Insecta
- Order: Lepidoptera
- Superfamily: Noctuoidea
- Family: Erebidae
- Genus: Flax
- Species: F. newbritaini

Binomial name
- Flax newbritaini Fibiger, 2011

Species of moth

Flax newbritaini is a moth of the family Erebidae first described by Michael Fibiger in 2011. It is found in Papua New Guinea (it was described from New Britain within the Bismarck Islands).

The wingspan is about 11 mm.
