= Tentasetae =

Scientific classification
- Domain: Eukaryota
- Kingdom: Animalia
- Phylum: Arthropoda
- Class: Insecta
- Order: Lepidoptera
- Superfamily: Noctuoidea
- Family: Erebidae
- Genus: Tentasetae; Fibiger, 2011
- Species: T. cambodiana

Binomial name
- Tentasetae cambodiana Fibiger, 2011

Genus of moths

Tentasetae is a monotypic moth genus of the family Erebidae. Its only species, Tentasetae cambodiana, is only known from Cambodia, where it was described from Bokor National Park. Both the genus and the species were first described by Michael Fibiger in 2011.

The wingspan is about 12 mm.
