= Arvède Barine =

French writer and historian

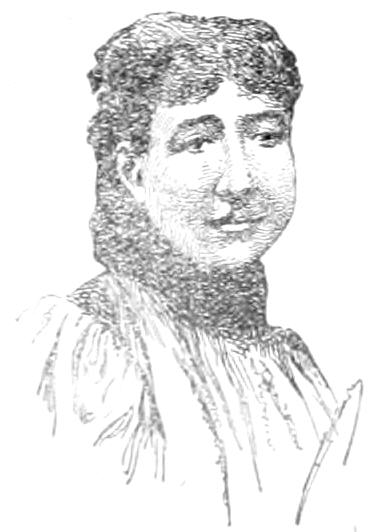

Arvède Barine (17 November 1840 – 14 November 1908), was a French writer and historian. Arvède Barine was the pseudonym of Mme. Charles Vincens, born Louise-Cécile Bouffé on 17 November 1840. She mostly wrote on the subject of women, but she also wrote about travel, the political issues of the day, and the fantastic literature of authors such as Edgar Allan Poe and E. T. A. Hoffmann. She died on 14 November 1908 in Paris.

== Works ==
- Translation of Tolstoy's "Souvenirs" (1886)
- "Portraits de Femmes" (1887, 3rd. ed. 1902)
- "Essais et Fantaisies" (1888)
- "Névrosés" (1898)
- "Princesses et Grandes Dames" (1890, 6th. ed. 1902)
- "Bernardin de Saint-Pierre" (1891)
- "Alfred de Musset" (1893, 3rd. ed. 1900)
- The Life of Alfred de Musset, English translation by Charles Conner Hayden, (1906), Published by Edwin Hill Co.
- "Louis XIV et la Grande Mademoiselle (1652-1693)" (1905)
