= Risk analysis (business) =

Identification and evaluation of risks

Risk analysis is the process of identifying and assessing risks that may jeopardize an organization's success. Risk analysis comprises the fundamental activities

1. Risk Assessment (can be conducted using various industry specific, hazard identification standards: ISO 12100, etc.)
2. Risk Management (can be managed using ISO 31000)
3. Risk Communication

Diligent risk analysis can help construct preventive measures to reduce the probability of incidents from occurring, as well as counter-measures to address incidents as they develop to minimize negative impacts on the organization.

A popular method to perform risk analysis on IT systems is called facilitated risk analysis process (FRAP).

== Facilitated risk analysis process ==
FRAP analyzes one system, application or segment of business processes at a time.

FRAP assumes that additional efforts to develop precisely quantified risks are not cost-effective because:

- such estimates are time-consuming
- risk documentation becomes too voluminous for practical use
- specific loss estimates are generally not needed to determine if controls are needed.
- without assumptions, there is little risk analysis

After identifying and categorizing risks, a team identifies the controls that could mitigate the risks. The decision regarding which controls are needed lies with the business manager. The team's conclusions as to which risks exist and which controls are needed are documented, along with a related action plan for control implementation.

Three of the most important risks a software company faces are: unexpected changes in revenue, unexpected changes in costs from those budgeted and the amount of specialization of the software planned. Risks that affect revenues can be: unanticipated competition, privacy, intellectual property right problems, and unit sales that are less than forecast. Unexpected development costs also create the risk that can be in the form of more rework than anticipated, security holes, and privacy invasions.

Narrow specialization of software with a large amount of research and development expenditures can lead to both business and technological risks since specialization does not necessarily lead to lower unit costs of software. Combined with the decrease in the potential customer base, specialization risk can be significant for a software firm. After probabilities of scenarios have been calculated with risk analysis, the process of risk management can be applied to help manage the risk.

Methods like applied information economics add to and improve on risk analysis methods by introducing procedures to adjust subjective probabilities and compute the value of additional information.

== See also ==
- Benefit risk
- Optimism bias
- Reference class forecasting
- Extreme risk
- Risk management
- Peren–Clement index
