= Paren, Kamchatka Krai =

Village in Penzhinsky District, Kamchatka Krai, Russia

Coordinates: 62°25′01″N 163°05′35″E

Paren (Russian: Парень) is a village in the Penzhinsky District, Kamchatka Krai, Russia, which lies along the river Paren. As of 2014, the population was 65 individuals. The village was settled by Koryaks in the 19th century. Until the 20th century, it was renowned for its blacksmithing and produced a Bowie-style knife known as a Paren knife The village was also known for producing rugs that were made by the Koryaks. The postal code is 688866.

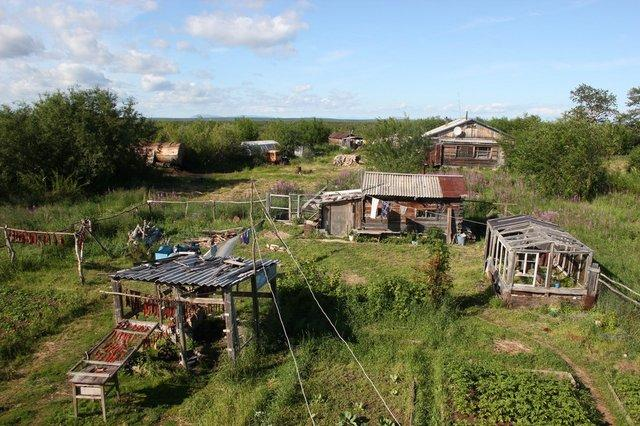
