= Parens occi =

Scientific classification
- Kingdom: Animalia
- Phylum: Arthropoda
- Clade: Pancrustacea
- Class: Insecta
- Order: Lepidoptera
- Superfamily: Noctuoidea
- Family: Erebidae
- Genus: Parens
- Species: P. occi

Binomial name
- Parens occi (Fibiger & Kononenko, 2008)

Synonyms
- Micronoctua occi Fibiger & Kononenko, 2008

Species of moth

Parens occi is a moth of the family Erebidae first described by Michael Fibiger and Vladimir S. Kononenko in 2008. It is known from the southern part of the Russian Far East to central, eastern and northeastern China, North Korea, South Korea, and Jeju Island. In Japan, it is known from the Tsushima Islands in the Korean Strait and Honshu.

Adults are on wing from mid-July to mid-August.

The wingspan is 9–12 mm.
