= Pirin, Kreševo =

Village in Central Bosnia

Pirin
- Village
- Location within Bosnia and Herzegovina
- Coordinates: 43.8464213°N 18.0828084°E
- Country: Bosnia and Herzegovina
- Entity: Federation of Bosnia and Herzegovina
- Canton: Central Bosnia
- Municipality: Kreševo

Area
  - Total: 1.14 sq mi (2.96 km^{2})

Population (2013)
  - Total: 0
  - Density: 0.0/sq mi (0.0/km^{2})
- Time zone: UTC+1 (CET)
  - Summer (DST): UTC+2 (CEST)

Bukva is a village in the municipality of Kreševo, Bosnia and Herzegovina.

== Demographics ==
According to the 2013 census, its population was nil, down from 160 in 1991.
