= Perin (name) =

Perin, Perín, or Périn is a given name and surname.

== Given name ==
- Perin Del Vaga (1501–1547), Italian painter
- Perin Jamsetjee Mistri (1913–1989), Indian architect

== Surname ==
- Blanca Cerón Perín (born 1974), Spanish swimmer
- John Perin (born 1948), Australian footballer
- Lié Louis Périn-Salbreux (1753–1817), French artist
- Mattia Perin (born 1992), Italian footballer
- Bernardo Perin (1897–1964), Italian footballer
- Meral Perin (born 1965), Turkish German actress
- Michel Périn (born 1957), French rally navigator
- Michel Périn (cyclist) (born 1947), French cyclist
- René Perin (1774–1858), French playwright
- Sophie Perin (born 1957), French beauty pageant winner
- Walis Perin (born 1952), Taiwanese Seediq politician
