= Pseudobscura =

Scientific classification
- Domain: Eukaryota
- Kingdom: Animalia
- Phylum: Arthropoda
- Class: Insecta
- Order: Lepidoptera
- Superfamily: Noctuoidea
- Family: Erebidae
- Genus: Pseudobscura; Fibiger, 2011
- Species: P. karwaria

Binomial name
- Pseudobscura karwaria Fibiger, 2011

Genus of moths

Pseudobscura is a monotypic moth genus of the family Erebidae. Its only species, Pseudobscura karwaria, is known only from southwestern India and was described from Kawar. Both the genus and the species were first described by Michael Fibiger in 2011.

The wingspan is about 7.5 mm.
