= Paren (river) =

River in northeastern Russia

- Location of the river mouth in Kamchatka Krai, Russia

Physical characteristics
- Source
  - location: Kolyma Mountains
- Mouth: Sea of Okhotsk
  - location: Penzhina Bay
  - coordinates: 62°24′47″N 163°08′49″E
- Length: 310 km (190 mi)
- Basin size: 13,200 km^{2} (5,100 sq mi)

The Paren (Russian: Парень) is a river in northeastern Russia which drains in to the Penzhina Bay of the Sea of Okhotsk. It is 310 kilometres (190 mi) long, and has a drainage basin of 13,200 square kilometres (5,100 sq mi). There is a village along with the riverbank also named Paren.

== See also ==
- List of rivers of Russia
