= Alienia =

Scientific classification
- Domain: Eukaryota
- Kingdom: Animalia
- Phylum: Arthropoda
- Class: Insecta
- Order: Lepidoptera
- Superfamily: Noctuoidea
- Family: Erebidae
- Genus: Alienia; Fibiger, 2011
- Species: A. flavofascia

Binomial name
- Alienia flavofascia Fibiger, 2011

Genus of moths

Alienia is a monotypic moth genus of the family Erebidae. Its only species, Alienia flavofascia, is found on Borneo and was described from the Crocker Range National Park in Sabah. Both the genus and the species were first described by Michael Fibiger in 2011.

The wingspan is about 12.5 mm.

The only known specimen was collected in a lower mountain forest in early August.
