= Acusa =

Scientific classification
- Domain: Eukaryota
- Kingdom: Animalia
- Phylum: Arthropoda
- Class: Insecta
- Order: Lepidoptera
- Superfamily: Noctuoidea
- Family: Erebidae
- Genus: Acusa; Fibiger, 2011
- Species: A. acus

Binomial name
- Acusa acus Fibiger, 2011

Genus of moths

Acusa is a monotypic moth genus of the family Erebidae. Its only species, Acusa acus, is only known from Sabah on Borneo. Both the genus and the species were first described by Michael Fibiger in 2011.

The wingspan is about 13 mm.
