= François-Tommy Perrens =

French professor of history

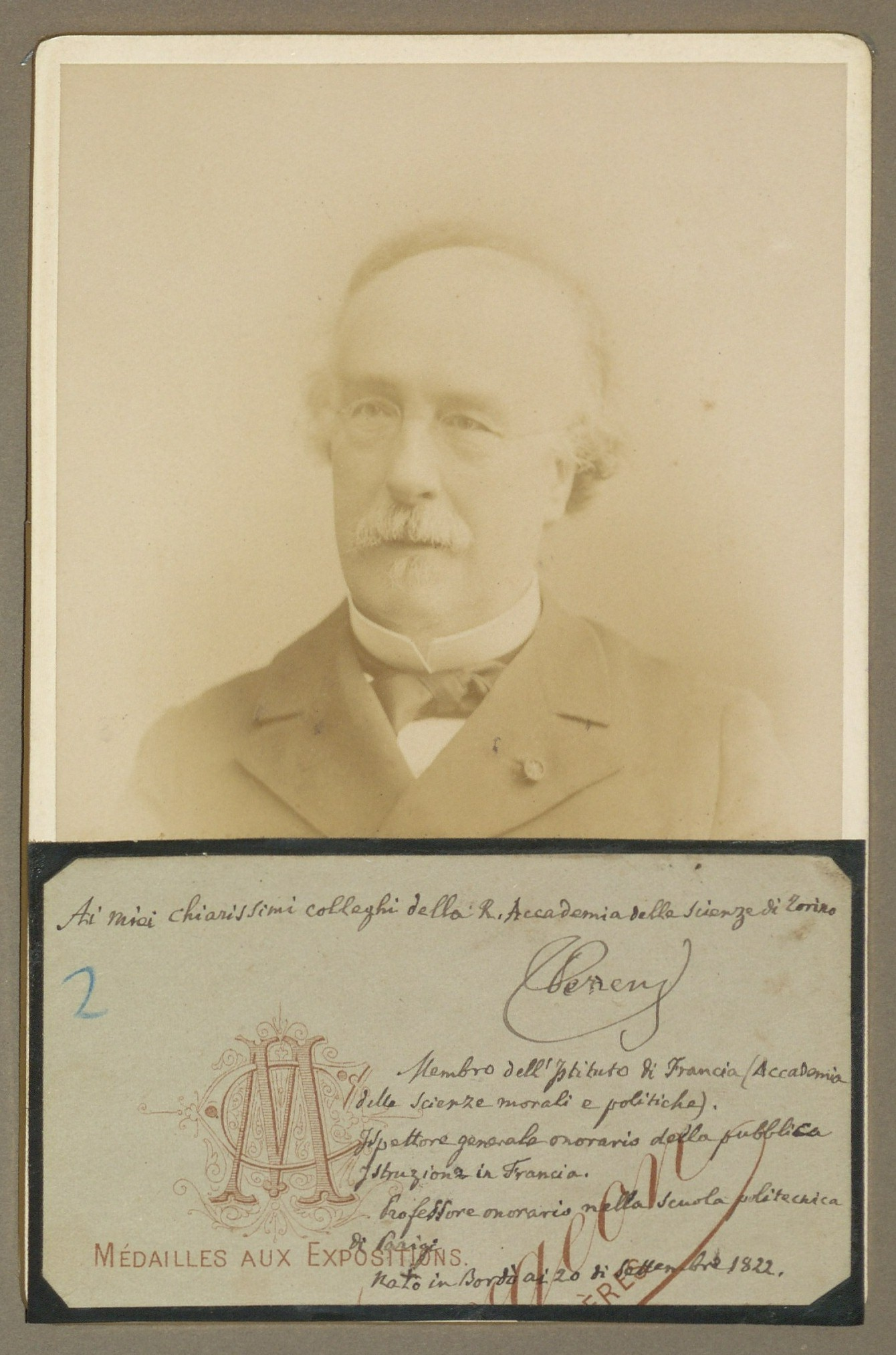
François-Tommy Perrens

François-Tommy Perrens (20 September 1822, Bordeaux – 2 February 1901, 16th arrondissement of Paris) was a French professor of history, noteworthy for his work on the history of Italy.

== Biography ==
After graduation from the lycée de Bordeaux and then from the École normale supérieure in 1843, he passed the Agrégation de Grammaire and eventually became a doctor of letters. He was a teacher at lycées in Bourges, Lyon and Montpellier, then at the lycée Bonaparte in Paris and at the École polytechnic from 1862. He was elected a member of the Academy of Moral and Political Sciences in 1887. In 1891 he was named inspecteur général honoraire de l'Instruction publique (honorary general inspector of public education).

His most important work is the monumental Histoire de Florence, published in six volumes between 1877 and 1883. Several of his other works were rewarded by the Académie française. His study on L'Église et l'État en France sous le règne de Henri IV et la régence de Marie de Médicis (The church and the state in France under the reign of Henri IV and the regency of Marie de Medici) won the grand prix Gobert in 1873. He also published numerous articles and memoirs, notably in the Revue des deux Mondes and in the Comptes rendus (Reports) of l'Académie des sciences morales et politiques.

François-Tommy Perrens was also correspondent of the Accademia delle Scienze di Torino (Royal Academy of Turin), knight of the Order of Saints Maurice and Lazarus, and chevalier de la Legion d'honneur (1870).

== Selected publications ==
- Jérôme Savonarole, sa vie, ses prédications, ses écrits, d'après les documents originaux et avec des pièces justificatives en grande partie inédites, 2 vol., 1853 (See Girolamo Savonarola.)
- Deux ans de révolution en Italie (1848-1849), 1857 LCCN 18-10528
- Étienne Marcel et le gouvernement de la bourgeoisie au quatorzième siècle : 1356-1358, 1860 Texte en ligne
- Histoire de la littérature italienne, 1867
- Les Mariages espagnols sous le règne de Henri IV et la régence de Marie de Médicis (1602-1615), 1869, Prix Halphen de l'Académie française
- L'Église et l'État en France sous le règne de Henri IV et la régence de Marie de Médicis, 2 vol., 1872.
- La Démocratie en France au Moyen Âge : histoire des tendances démocratiques dans les populations urbaines au XIV^{e} et au XV^{e} siècle, 2 vol., 1873
- Histoire de Florence, 6 vol., 1877-1883 Texte en ligne 1 2 3 4 5 6 LCCN 25-12943
  - Perrens, F.-T. (1892). The History of Florence under the Domination of Cosimo, Piero, Lorenzo de' Médicis, 1434–1492. Vol. 1. Translated by Hannah Lynch. London: Methuen & Company.
- La Civilisation florentine du XIII^{e} au XVI^{e} siècle; 2014 French pbk reprint. Hatchette Livre et la BNF. ISBN 2013501471.
- Les Libertins en France au XVII^{e} siècle, 1896 Texte en ligne (See libertine.)
- Histoire sommaire de la littérature française au XIX^{e} siècle, 1898; 2018 hbk reprint. ISBN 0332913996.
