= Peren Namdi =

Peren Namdi Peren Namdi (UR)
- village
- Location in Nagaland, India Peren Namdi (India)
- Coordinates: 25.495659°N 93.730179°E
- Country: India
- State: Nagaland
- District: Peren
- Circle: Peren

Population (2011)
  - Total: 176
- Time zone: UTC+5:30 (IST)
- Census code: 268396

Peren Namdi is a village in the Peren district of Nagaland, India. It is located in the Peren Circle.

== Demographics ==
According to the 2011 census of India, Peren Namdi has 39 households. The effective literacy rate (i.e. the literacy rate of population excluding children aged 6 and below) is 74.6%.

Demographics (2011 Census)
	Total	Male	Female
Population	176	82	94
Children aged below 6 years	50	22	28
Scheduled caste	0	0	0
Scheduled tribe	150	68	82
Literates	94	51	43
Workers (all)	106	55	51
Main workers (total)	74	41	33
Main workers: Cultivators	50	24	26
Main workers: Agricultural labourers	1	1	0
Main workers: Household industry workers	3	2	1
Main workers: Other	20	14	6
Marginal workers (total)	32	14	18
Marginal workers: Cultivators	17	6	11
Marginal workers: Agricultural labourers	0	0	0
Marginal workers: Household industry workers	0	0	0
Marginal workers: Others	15	8	7
Non-workers	70	27	43
