= Old Peren =

Old Peren Peren (Old)
- village
- Location in Nagaland, India Old Peren (India)
- Coordinates: 25.474999°N 93.726052°E
- Country: India
- State: Nagaland
- District: Peren
- Circle: Peren

Population (2011)
  - Total: 442
- Time zone: UTC+5:30 (IST)
- Census code: 268397

Old Peren is a village in the Peren district of Nagaland, India. It is located in the Peren Circle.

== Demographics ==
According to the 2011 census of India, Peren (Old) has 98 households. The effective literacy rate (i.e. the literacy rate of population excluding children aged 6 and below) is 79.47%.

Demographics (2011 Census)
	Total	Male	Female
Population	442	226	216
Children aged below 6 years	101	50	51
Scheduled caste	0	0	0
Scheduled tribe	442	226	216
Literates	271	155	116
Workers (all)	198	105	93
Main workers (total)	186	97	89
Main workers: Cultivators	138	63	75
Main workers: Agricultural labourers	5	3	2
Main workers: Household industry workers	0	0	0
Main workers: Other	43	31	12
Marginal workers (total)	12	8	4
Marginal workers: Cultivators	0	0	0
Marginal workers: Agricultural labourers	8	6	2
Marginal workers: Household industry workers	1	1	0
Marginal workers: Others	3	1	2
Non-workers	244	121	123
