= Parens (moth) =

Scientific classification
- Domain: Eukaryota
- Kingdom: Animalia
- Phylum: Arthropoda
- Class: Insecta
- Order: Lepidoptera
- Superfamily: Noctuoidea
- Family: Erebidae
- Subtribe: Tentaxina
- Genus: Parens; Fibiger, 2011

Genus of moths

Parens is a genus of moths of the family Erebidae erected by Michael Fibiger in 2011.

== Species ==
- Parens chekiangi Fibiger, 2011
- Parens fibigerina Lee & Byun, 2024
- Parens melli Fibiger, 2011
- Parens occi (Fibiger & Kononenko, 2008)
- Parens paraocci Fibiger, 2011
