= New Peren =

New Peren Peren (New)
- village
- Location in Nagaland, India New Peren (India)
- Coordinates: 25.495120°N 93.657445°E
- Country: India
- State: Nagaland
- District: Peren
- Circle: Peren Circle

Population (2011)
  - Total: 383
- Time zone: UTC+5:30 (IST)
- Census code: 268392

New Peren is a village under Peren district of Nagaland, India. It is located in the Peren Circle.

== Demographics ==
According to the 2011 census of India, New Peren has 104 households. The effective literacy rate (i.e. the literacy rate of population excluding children aged 6 and below) is 79.64%.

Demographics (2011 Census)
| | Total | Male | Female |
|---|---|---|---|
| Population | 383 | 192 | 191 |
| Children aged below 6 years | 108 | 53 | 55 |
| Scheduled caste | 0 | 0 | 0 |
| Scheduled tribe | 357 | 181 | 176 |
| Literates | 219 | 122 | 97 |
| Workers (all) | 223 | 116 | 107 |
| Main workers (total) | 198 | 102 | 96 |
| Main workers: Cultivators | 167 | 85 | 82 |
| Main workers: Agricultural labourers | 9 | 3 | 6 |
| Main workers: Household industry workers | 4 | 3 | 1 |
| Main workers: Other | 18 | 11 | 7 |
| Marginal workers (total) | 25 | 14 | 11 |
| Marginal workers: Cultivators | 23 | 13 | 10 |
| Marginal workers: Agricultural labourers | 0 | 0 | 0 |
| Marginal workers: Household industry workers | 0 | 0 | 0 |
| Marginal workers: Others | 2 | 1 | 1 |
| Non-workers | 160 | 76 | 84 |
