= Perrin =

Perrin may refer to:

== Places in the United States ==
- Perrin, Missouri, an unincorporated community
- Perrin, Texas, an unincorporated community in southeastern Jack County, Texas

== Other ==
- Famille Perrin, French winery owners
- Perrin friction factors, in hydrodynamics
- Perrin number, in mathematics
- Éditions Perrin, a publishing house (est. 1827)
- Perrin's beaked whale, a recently described species of whale
- Perrin's cave beetle, an extinct freshwater beetle from France
- Towers Perrin, a global professional services firm

== People ==
=== Surname ===
- Abner Monroe Perrin (1827–1864), Confederate States Army general
- Alain Perrin (born 1956), French association football coach, former manager of China national team
- Ami Perrin (died 1561), Swiss opponent of Calvinism reform
- Benjamin Perrin, Canadian professor
- Benny Perrin (1959–2017), American football safety
- Bernadette Perrin-Riou (born 1955), French number theorist
- Carmen Perrin (born 1953), Bolivian-born Swiss artist and educator
- Cédric Perrin (born 1974), French politician
- Christopher Perrin (born 1961), American publisher, educator, and writer
- Claude-Victor Perrin, duc de Belluno (1764–1841), marshal of France during the French Revolutionary and Napoleonic Wars
- Conny Perrin (born 1990), Swiss tennis player
- Daniel Perrin (1642–1719), one of the first permanent European inhabitants of Staten Island, New York
- Davina Perrin (born 2006), female English cricketer
- Don Perrin (born 1964), Canadian writer and former military officer
- Edwin O. Perrin (1822–1889), New York lawyer
- Elula Perrin (1929–2004), French-Vietnamese writer
- Elzéar Abeille de Perrin (1843–1910), French entomologist
- Émile Perrin (1814–1885), French painter, theatre director and impresario
- Éric Perrin (born 1975), NHL center for the Atlanta Thrashers
- Francis Perrin (actor) (born 1947), French actor, screenwriter and director
- Francis Perrin (physicist) (1901–1992), French physicist
- Frederick Perrin, American chess master
- Gaëtan Perrin (born 1996), French professional footballer
- Gillian Perrin (born 1950), English former badminton player
- Harold Perrin (c. 1878–1948), British aviation pioneer
- Hélène Perrin (born 1972), French physicist
- Henriette Perrin-Duportal (1869-1938), French historian and writer, friend of Marie Curie, married to Jean Perrin, mother of Francis Perrin (physicist)
- Henry Perrin Coon (1822–1884), American, 10th Mayor of San Francisco
- Jack Perrin (1896–1967), American actor specializing in westerns
- Jacques Perrin (1941–2022), French actor and film maker
- Jean Baptiste Perrin (1870–1942), French physicist (Nobel prize 1926)
- Jean-Georges Perrin (born 1971), French IT expert and serial entrepreneur
- Jean-Paul Perrin (born 1580), French preacher and historian
- Jim Perrin, British rock climber and travel writer
- John Draper Perrin (1890–1967), Canadian mining executive and civic leader
- John Gordon Perrin (born 1989), Canadian volleyball player
- Joseph Perrin (1754–1800), French army general
- L. Timothy Perrin, American academic
- Loïc Perrin (born 1985), French association football player
- Lonnie Perrin (1952–2021), American football running back
- Lucas Perrin (born 1998), French professional footballer
- Marguerite Perrin, American Trading Spouses participant
- Mark Perrin Lowrey (1828–1885), American Southern Baptist preacher
- Maurice Perrin (bishop) (1904–1994), French bishop in Tunisia, diplomat
- Maurice Perrin (cyclist) (1911–1992), French Olympic cyclist
- Maurice Perrin (physician) (1875–1956), French physician
- Nat Perrin (1905–1998), a comedy writer
- Nicholas Perrin, American academic administrator and religious scholar
- Noel Perrin (1927–2004), American essayist and a professor at Dartmouth College
- Patricia Charlotte Perrin (1921–1988), New Zealand potter
- Percy Perrin (1876–1945), English cricketer, played for Essex
- Philippe Perrin (born 1963), test pilot and former CNES and European Space Agency astronaut
- Pierre Perrin (c. 1620–1675), French poet and librettist
- Ronald Edward Perrin (1931–1997), British cathedral organist
- Sam Perrin (1901–1998), American screenwriter
- Stephen Perrin (born 1970) English cricketer and footballer
- Steve Perrin (1946–2021), American game designer and technical writer/editor
- Steve Perrin (born 1952) English footballer (Crystal Palace, Plymouth Argyle and Portsmouth)
- Vic Perrin (1916–1989), American actor and voice artist
- William Perrin (convict) (1831–1903), convict transported to Western Australia, later becoming a school teacher
- William Gordon Perrin (1874–1931), R.A.F. and Navy officer, and the Admiralty librarian 1908 to 1931, author of British Flags

=== Given name ===
- Perrin Beatty (born 1950), corporate executive and former Canadian politician
- Perrin Kaplan, vice president of Marketing & Corporate Affairs for Nintendo of America Inc

== Fiction ==
- Perrin (Star Trek), a fictional character in the Star Trek universe
- Perrin Fertha, a fictional character in the Star Wars universe
- Perrin Aybara, a main character of Robert Jordan's epic fantasy The Wheel of Time
- The Fall and Rise of Reginald Perrin, a novel and British sitcom written by David Nobbs
- Reggie Perrin, a remake of The Fall and Rise of Reginald Perrin broadcast in 2009

== See also ==
- Lea & Perrins, a United Kingdom food company, originating in Worcester
- Perin (disambiguation)
