= Perin, Iran =

Perin پرين
- Village
- Location within Iran
- Coordinates: 30°23′36″N 51°21′32″E
- Country: Iran
- Province: Fars
- County: Rostam
- Bakhsh: Sorna
- Rural District: Poshtkuh-e Rostam

Population (2006)
  - Total: 616
- Time zone: UTC+3:30 (IRST)
  - Summer (DST): UTC+4:30 (IRDT)

Perin (Persian: پرين, also Romanized as Perīn; also known as Ferīn, Parad, and Pīrīn) is a village in Poshtkuh-e Rostam Rural District, Sorna District, Rostam County, Fars province, Iran. At the 2006 census, its population was 616, in 119 families.
