= Peren–Clement index =

The Peren–Clement index is a method of country-specific risk analysis for businesses engaged in international trade and direct investment. This instrument provides a guideline when deciding which foreign markets offer the possibility of additional business engagement and investment and the extent of an existing engagement or investment can be increased or should be reduced.

The Peren-Clement index can be used as an early detection system, which evaluates probabilities and risks of an investment in a certain foreign market, which are determined by the political situation, its social, economical and judicial environment as well as its predictable or anticipated future developments of that country.

== Users ==
These kind of analyses are conducted amongst other things by international rating agencies, export credit insurances and international organisations. In many cases the analysed countries are brought into a country rating.

== Methods ==
The aim is the classification of countries in an order of precedence, for example in regard to their attractiveness for a financial investment. Because country risks are not objectively certifiable and are not directly observable, stable correlations between observable risk-determining and representative quantities must be searched for. Hereby, one must differentiate between qualitative (political situation) and quantitative (economic results) risk factors. The country-specific risk analysis also requires a retrospective observation, which attempts to discover the causes of risks and lay open the cause-and-effect relations. Thereafter, the factors which are to be predicted are deduced and indicators for a prognosis are determined, so that the next step leads to a cause-related and future-oriented risk evaluation.

The Peren–Clement index is a risk index for the evaluation of country-specific risks concerning direct investment. Besides the Business-Environment Risk Index, it is one of two established indexes for the country-specific risk analysis. When looking at risk-indexes, it is normally the case that company-wide factors initially come to the fore. The Peren–Clement index also starts from this point, but orientates the factors towards a core statement that is relevant in practice. Similarly constructed Indexes (including the BERI Index, see German article) refrain from interrelating their risk analysis with corporate objectives in the course of events. But practical experience shows that the assessment of country-specific risks for direct investment can not be looked at separately from the particular existing motives. Empirical analyses show that especially cost- and production-dependent as well as marketing oriented motives dominate the decision for, or against, direct investments.

The type of investment and the motives of the particular companies result in different site-related factors and different emphasis on the individual factors respectively. For a cost-oriented foreign investment one would lay a stronger emphasis upon the cost- and production-oriented factors and the choice of location would be made thereafter. In contrast, for marketing-oriented investments factors such as competitive environment and size of the market will be of higher importance. Peren–Clement’s risk-index is thus coined by three categories of influencing factors:

- Company-wide factors
- Cost- and production-oriented factors
- Marketing-oriented factors

The index can be complemented, amongst others, by inclusion of additional motives. For instance companies that aim to secure their raw material base, will keep an eye on the accessibility of raw material sources. For this the political stability and compliance with stipulations play a role.

The total achieved score for the individual country can now be classified in the model. Hereby the respective country-specific risks can be graded into classes and an estimation of risks can be made.
