= Maurice Perrin (physician) =

French physician and professor of medicine

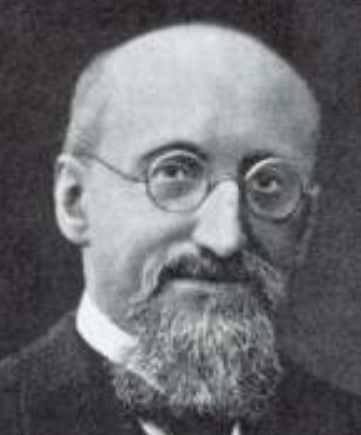
Maurice Perrin Portrait

Maurice Perrin (21 May 1875 – 18 October 1956) was a French physician and professor of medicine at Nancy.

He earned a Bachelor of Arts in philosophy at 19, began employment for a hospital in 1898 and earned his MD in 1901 with a thesis on polyneuritis. He became an associate in 1910, and was posted to the tuberculosis clinic where he remained for 25 years.

He published over 200 articles, including his thesis in 1932 focusing on "the Alveolar echinococcosis of the liver". He became a professor of clinical medicine at Nancy in 1936.

He was promoted to the rank of colonel in the French Army Reserves in 1936.
