= List of Malpighiales of South Africa =

Flowering plants in the order Malpighiales recorded from South Africa

The Malpighiales comprise one of the largest orders of flowering plants, containing about 36 families and more than 16,000 species, about 7.8% of the eudicots. The order is very diverse, containing plants as different as the willow, violet, poinsettia, manchineel, rafflesia and coca plant, and are hard to recognize except with molecular phylogenetic evidence. It is not part of any of the classification systems based only on plant morphology. Molecular clock calculations estimate the origin of stem group Malpighiales at around 100 million years ago (Mya) and the origin of crown group Malpighiales at about 90 Mya.

The anthophytes are a grouping of plant taxa bearing flower-like reproductive structures. They were formerly thought to be a clade comprising plants bearing flower-like structures. The group contained the angiosperms - the extant flowering plants, such as roses and grasses - as well as the Gnetales and the extinct Bennettitales.

23,420 species of vascular plant have been recorded in South Africa, making it the sixth most species-rich country in the world and the most species-rich country on the African continent. Of these, 153 species are considered to be threatened. Nine biomes have been described in South Africa: Fynbos, Succulent Karoo, desert, Nama Karoo, grassland, savanna, Albany thickets, the Indian Ocean coastal belt, and forests.

The 2018 South African National Biodiversity Institute's National Biodiversity Assessment plant checklist lists 35,130 taxa in the phyla Anthocerotophyta (hornworts (6)), Anthophyta (flowering plants (33534)), Bryophyta (mosses (685)), Cycadophyta (cycads (42)), Lycopodiophyta (Lycophytes(45)), Marchantiophyta (liverworts (376)), Pinophyta (conifers (33)), and Pteridophyta (cryptogams (408)).

20 families are represented in the literature. Listed taxa include species, subspecies, varieties, and forms as recorded, some of which have subsequently been allocated to other taxa as synonyms, in which cases the accepted taxon is appended to the listing. Multiple entries under alternative names reflect taxonomic revision over time.

== Achariaceae ==
Family: Achariaceae,

=== Acharia ===
Genus Acharia:

- Acharia tragodes Thunb. endemic

=== Ceratiosicyos ===
Genus Ceratiosicyos:

- Ceratiosicyos laevis (Thunb.) A.Meeuse, indigenous

=== Guthriea ===
Genus Guthriea:

- Guthriea capensis Bolus, indigenous

=== Kiggelaria ===
Genus Kiggelaria:

- Kiggelaria africana L. indigenous

=== Rawsonia ===
Genus Rawsonia:

- Rawsonia lucida Harv. & Sond. indigenous

=== Xylotheca ===
Genus Xylotheca:

- Xylotheca kraussiana Hochst. indigenous

== Chrysobalanaceae ==
Family: Chrysobalanaceae,

=== Parinari ===
Genus Parinari:

- Parinari capensis Harv. indigenous
  - Parinari capensis Harv. subsp. capensis, indigenous
  - Parinari capensis Harv. subsp. incohata F.White, indigenous
- Parinari curatellifolia Planch. ex Benth. indigenous

== Clusiaceae ==
Family: Clusiaceae,

=== Clusia ===
Genus Clusia:

- Clusia rosea Jacq. not indigenous, cultivated, naturalised, invasive

=== Garcinia ===
Genus Garcinia:

- Garcinia gerrardii Harv. ex Sim, indigenous
- Garcinia livingstonei T.Anderson, indigenous

== Dichapetalaceae ==
Family: Dichapetalaceae,

=== Dichapetalum ===
Genus Dichapetalum:

- Dichapetalum cymosum (Hook.) Engl. indigenous

=== Tapura ===
Genus Tapura:

- Tapura fischeri Engl. indigenous

== Elatinaceae ==
Family: Elatinaceae,

=== Bergia ===
Genus Bergia:

- Bergia anagalloides E.Mey. ex Fenzl, indigenous
- Bergia capensis L. indigenous
- Bergia decumbens Planch. ex Harv. indigenous
- Bergia glomerata L.f. endemic
- Bergia pentheriana Keissl. indigenous
- Bergia polyantha Sond. indigenous
- Bergia salaria Bremek. indigenous

=== Elatine ===
Genus Elatine:

- Elatine ambigua Wight, indigenous
- Elatine triandra Schkuhr, indigenous

== Erythroxylaceae ==
Family: Erythroxylaceae,

=== Erythroxylum ===
Genus Erythroxylum:

- Erythroxylum delagoense Schinz, indigenous
- Erythroxylum emarginatum Thonn. indigenous
- Erythroxylum pictum E.Mey. ex Sond. endemic

=== Nectaropetalum ===
Genus Nectaropetalum:

- Nectaropetalum capense (Bolus) Stapf & Boodle, endemic
- Nectaropetalum zuluense (Schonland) Corbishley, endemic

== Euphorbiaceae ==
Family: Euphorbiaceae, 47 genera have been recorded. Not all are necessarily currently accepted.

- Genus Acalypha:
- Genus Adenocline:
- Genus Alchornea:
- Genus Aleurites:
- Genus Anisophyllum:
- Genus Anthacantha:
- Genus Arthrothamnus:
- Genus Breynia:
- Genus Caperonia:
- Genus Cavacoa
- Genus Cephalocroton:
- Genus Chamaesyce:
- Genus Chrozophora:
- Genus Clutia:
- Genus Croton:
- Genus Ctenomeria:
- Genus Dactylanthes:
- Genus Dalechampia:
- Genus Erythrococca:
- Genus Euphorbia:
- Genus Excoecaria:
- Genus Galarhoeus:
- Genus Homalanthus:
- Genus Jatropha:
- Genus Leidesia:
- Genus Macaranga:
- Genus Manihot:
- Genus Medusea:
- Genus Mercurialis:
- Genus Micrococca:
- Genus Monadenium:
- Genus Pedilanthus:
- Genus Pterococcus:
- Genus Ricinus:
- Genus Sapium:
- Genus Schinziophyton:
- Genus Sclerocroton:
- Genus Seidelia:
- Genus Shirakiopsis:
- Genus Spirostachys:
- Genus Suregada:
- Genus Synadenium:
- Genus Tithymalus:
- Genus Tragia:
- Genus Tragiella:
- Genus Treisia:
- Genus Vernicia:

== Hypericaceae ==
Family: Hypericaceae,

=== Hypericum ===
Genus Hypericum:

- Hypericum aethiopicum Thunb. indigenous
  - Hypericum aethiopicum Thunb. subsp. aethiopicum, indigenous
  - Hypericum aethiopicum Thunb. subsp. sonderi (Bredell) N.Robson, indigenous
- Hypericum androsaemum L. not indigenous, naturalised, invasive
- Hypericum canariense L. not indigenous, cultivated, naturalised, invasive
- Hypericum forrestii (Chitt.) N.Robson, not indigenous, naturalised
- Hypericum hookerianum Wight & Arn. not indigenous, naturalised
- Hypericum lalandii Choisy, indigenous
- Hypericum natalense J.M.Wood & M.S.Evans, indigenous
- Hypericum perforatum L. not indigenous, naturalised, invasive
- Hypericum pseudohenryi N.Robson, not indigenous, naturalised, invasive
- Hypericum revolutum Vahl, indigenous
  - Hypericum revolutum Vahl subsp. revolutum, indigenous
- Hypericum roeperianum G.W.Schimp. ex A.Rich. indigenous
  - Hypericum roeperianum G.W.Schimp. ex A.Rich. var. roeperianum, indigenous
- Hypericum wilmsii R.Keller, indigenous

== Linaceae ==
Family: Linaceae,

=== Hugonia ===
Genus Hugonia:

- Hugonia orientalis Engl. indigenous

=== Linum ===
Genus Linum:

- Linum acuticarpum C.M.Rogers, endemic
- Linum adustum E.Mey. ex Planch. endemic
- Linum aethiopicum Thunb. endemic
- Linum africanum L. endemic
- Linum brevistylum C.M.Rogers, endemic
- Linum comptonii C.M.Rogers, endemic
- Linum esterhuyseniae C.M.Rogers, endemic
- Linum gracile Planch. endemic
- Linum heterostylum C.M.Rogers, endemic
- Linum pungens Planch. endemic
- Linum quadrifolium L. endemic
- Linum thesioides Bartl. endemic
- Linum thunbergii Eckl. & Zeyh. indigenous
- Linum usitatissimum L. not indigenous, cultivated, naturalised
- Linum villosum C.M.Rogers, endemic

== Malpighiaceae ==
Family: Malpighiaceae,

=== Acridocarpus ===
Genus Acridocarpus:

- Acridocarpus natalitius A.Juss. indigenous
  - Acridocarpus natalitius A.Juss. var. linearifolius Launert, indigenous
  - Acridocarpus natalitius A.Juss. var. natalitius, indigenous

=== Sphedamnocarpus ===
Genus Sphedamnocarpus:

- Sphedamnocarpus pruriens (A.Juss.) Szyszyl. indigenous
  - Sphedamnocarpus pruriens (A.Juss.) Szyszyl. subsp. galphimiifolius (A.Juss.) P.D.de Villiers & D.J.B, indigenous
  - Sphedamnocarpus pruriens (A.Juss.) Szyszyl. subsp. pruriens, indigenous
- Sphedamnocarpus transvalicus (Kuntze) Burtt Davy, accepted as Sphedamnocarpus pruriens (A.Juss.) Szyszyl. subsp. galphimiifolius (A.Juss.) P.D.de Villiers & D.J.B, present

=== Triaspis ===
Genus Triaspis:

- Triaspis glaucophylla Engl. endemic
  - Triaspis hypericoides (DC.) Burch. indigenous
  - Triaspis hypericoides (DC.) Burch. subsp. canescens (Engl.) Immelman, indigenous
  - Triaspis hypericoides (DC.) Burch. subsp. hypericoides, indigenous
  - Triaspis hypericoides (DC.) Burch. subsp. nelsonii (Oliv.) Immelman, indigenous

== Ochnaceae ==
Family: Ochnaceae,

=== Brackenridgea ===
Genus Brackenridgea:

- Brackenridgea zanguebarica Oliv. indigenous

=== Ochna ===
Genus Ochna:

- Ochna arborea Burch. ex DC. indigenous
  - Ochna arborea Burch. ex DC. var. arborea, indigenous
  - Ochna arborea Burch. ex DC. var. oconnorii (E.Phillips) Du Toit, indigenous
- Ochna barbosae N.Robson, indigenous
- Ochna confusa Burtt Davy & Greenway, indigenous
- Ochna gamostigmata du Toit, indigenous
- Ochna glauca I.Verd. indigenous
- Ochna holstii Engl. indigenous
- Ochna inermis (Forssk.) Schweinf. indigenous
- Ochna natalitia (Meisn.) Walp. indigenous
- Ochna pretoriensis E.Phillips, indigenous
- Ochna pulchra Hook.f. indigenous
- Ochna serrulata (Hochst.) Walp. indigenous

== Passifloraceae ==
Family: Passifloraceae,

=== Adenia ===
Genus Adenia:

- Adenia digitata (Harv.) Engl. indigenous
- Adenia fruticosa Burtt Davy, indigenous
  - Adenia fruticosa Burtt Davy subsp. fruticosa, endemic
  - Adenia fruticosa Burtt Davy subsp. simplicifolia W.J.de Wilde, indigenous
  - Adenia fruticosa Burtt Davy subsp. trifoliata W.J.de Wilde, endemic
- Adenia glauca Schinz, indigenous
- Adenia gummifera (Harv.) Harms, indigenous
- Adenia gummifera (Harv.) Harms var. gummifera, indigenous
- Adenia hastata (Harv.) Schinz, indigenous
  - Adenia hastata (Harv.) Schinz var. glandulifera W.J.de Wilde, indigenous
  - Adenia hastata (Harv.) Schinz var. hastata, indigenous
- Adenia natalensis W.J.de Wilde, endemic
- Adenia repanda (Burch.) Engl. indigenous
- Adenia spinosa Burtt Davy, indigenous
- Adenia wilmsii Harms, endemic

=== Basananthe ===
Genus Basananthe:

- Basananthe pedata (Baker f.) W.J.de Wilde, indigenous
- Basananthe polygaloides (Hutch. & K.Pearce) W.J.de Wilde, endemic
- Basananthe sandersonii (Harv.) W.J.de Wilde, indigenous
- Basananthe triloba (Bolus) W.J.de Wilde, indigenous

=== Paropsia ===
Genus Paropsia:

- Paropsia braunii Gilg, indigenous

=== Passiflora ===
Genus Passiflora:

- Passiflora caerulea L. not indigenous, naturalised, invasive
- Passiflora edulis Sims, not indigenous, naturalised, invasive
- Passiflora foetida L. not indigenous, naturalised
- Passiflora manicata (Juss.) Pers. not indigenous, naturalised
- Passiflora mollissima (Kunth) L.H.Bailey, accepted as Passiflora tripartita Breiter var. mollissima (Kunth) Holm-Niels. & P.Jorg. not indigenous, naturalised
- Passiflora suberosa L. not indigenous, naturalised, invasive
- Passiflora subpeltata Ortega, not indigenous, naturalised, invasive
- Passiflora tripartita Breiter var. mollissima (Kunth) Holm-Niels. & P.Jorg. not indigenous, naturalised, invasive

=== Schlechterina ===
Genus Schlechterina:

- Schlechterina mitostemmatoides Harms, indigenous

== Phyllanthaceae ==
Family: Phyllanthaceae,

=== Andrachne ===
Genus Andrachne:

- Andrachne ovalis (E.Mey. ex Sond.) Mull.Arg. indigenous

=== Antidesma ===
Genus Antidesma:

- Antidesma venosum E.Mey. ex Tul. indigenous

=== Bridelia ===
Genus Bridelia:

- Bridelia cathartica G.Bertol. indigenous
  - Bridelia cathartica G.Bertol. subsp. cathartica, indigenous
  - Bridelia cathartica G.Bertol. var. melanthesoides forma melanthesoides, indigenous
- Bridelia micrantha (Hochst.) Baill. indigenous
- Bridelia mollis Hutch. indigenous

=== Cleistanthus ===
Genus Cleistanthus:

- Cleistanthus schlechteri (Pax) Hutch. indigenous
  - Cleistanthus schlechteri (Pax) Hutch. var. schlechteri, indigenous

=== Flueggea ===
Genus Flueggea:

- Flueggea verrucosa (Thunb.) G.L.Webster, endemic
- Flueggea virosa (Roxb. ex Willd.) Voigt, indigenous
  - Flueggea virosa (Roxb. ex Willd.) Voigt subsp. virosa, indigenous

=== Heywoodia ===
Genus Heywoodia:

- Heywoodia lucens Sim, indigenous

=== Hymenocardia ===
Genus Hymenocardia:

- Hymenocardia ulmoides Oliv. indigenous
  - Hymenocardia ulmoides Oliv. var. capensis Pax, accepted as Hymenocardia ulmoides Oliv. indigenous

=== Lachnostylis ===
Genus Lachnostylis:

- Lachnostylis bilocularis R.A.Dyer, endemic
- Lachnostylis hanekomii R.H.Archer & J.C.Manning, endemic
- Lachnostylis hirta (L.f.) Mull.Arg. endemic

=== Margaritaria ===
Genus Margaritaria:

- Margaritaria discoidea (Baill.) G.L.Webster, indigenous
  - Margaritaria discoidea (Baill.) G.L.Webster var. fagifolia (Pax) Radcl.-Sm. indigenous
  - Margaritaria discoidea (Baill.) G.L.Webster var. nitida (Pax) Radcl.-Sm. indigenous

=== Phyllanthus ===
Genus Phyllanthus:

- Phyllanthus asperulatus Hutch. indigenous
- Phyllanthus burchellii Mull.Arg. accepted as Phyllanthus parvulus Sond. var. garipensis (E.Mey. ex Drege) Radcl.-Sm. present
- Phyllanthus cedrelifolius I.Verd. accepted as Phyllanthus polyanthus Pax, present
- Phyllanthus delagoensis Hutch. indigenous
- Phyllanthus fraternus G.L.Webster, not indigenous, naturalised
- Phyllanthus genistoides Sond. accepted as Phyllanthus incurvus Thunb. present
- Phyllanthus glaucophyllus Sond. indigenous
- Phyllanthus graminicola Hutch. ex S.Moore, indigenous
- Phyllanthus heterophyllus E.Mey. ex Mull.Arg. indigenous
- Phyllanthus incurvus Thunb. indigenous
- Phyllanthus loandensis Welw. ex Mull.Arg. indigenous
- Phyllanthus macranthus Pax, indigenous
  - Phyllanthus macranthus Pax var. macranthus, indigenous
- Phyllanthus maderaspatensis L. indigenous
- Phyllanthus meyerianus Mull.Arg. indigenous
- Phyllanthus myrtaceus Sond. indigenous
- Phyllanthus nummulariifolius Poir. indigenous
  - Phyllanthus nummulariifolius Poir. var. nummulariifolius, indigenous
- Phyllanthus omahakensis Dinter & Pax, indigenous
- Phyllanthus parvulus Sond. indigenous
  - Phyllanthus parvulus Sond. var. garipensis (E.Mey. ex Drege) Radcl.-Sm. indigenous
  - Phyllanthus parvulus Sond. var. parvulus, indigenous
- Phyllanthus pentandrus Schumach. & Thonn. indigenous
- Phyllanthus pinnatus (Wight) G.L.Webster, indigenous
- Phyllanthus polyanthus Pax, indigenous
- Phyllanthus polyspermus Schumach. indigenous
- Phyllanthus reticulatus Poir. indigenous
  - Phyllanthus reticulatus Poir. var. reticulatus, indigenous
- Phyllanthus tenellus Roxb. var. garipensis (E.Mey. ex Drege) Mull.Arg. accepted as Phyllanthus parvulus Sond. var. garipensis (E.Mey. ex Drege) Radcl.-Sm. present

=== Pseudolachnostylis ===
Genus Pseudolachnostylis:

- Pseudolachnostylis maprouneifolia Pax, indigenous
  - Pseudolachnostylis maprouneifolia Pax var. dekindtii (Pax) Radcl.-Sm. indigenous
  - Pseudolachnostylis maprouneifolia Pax var. glabra (Pax) Brenan, indigenous

== Picrodendraceae ==
Family: Picrodendraceae,

=== Androstachys ===
Genus Androstachys:

- Androstachys johnsonii Prain, indigenous

=== Hyaenanche ===
Genus Hyaenanche:

- Hyaenanche globosa (Gaertn.) Lamb. & Vahl, endemic

== Podostemaceae ==
Family: Podostemaceae,

=== Leiothylax ===
Genus Leiothylax:

- Leiothylax warmingii (Engl.) Warm. accepted as Letestuella tisserantii G.Taylor

=== Sphaerothylax ===
Genus Sphaerothylax:

- Sphaerothylax algiformis Bisch. ex C.Krauss, indigenous

=== Tristicha ===
Genus Tristicha:

- Tristicha trifaria (Bory ex Willd.) Spreng. indigenous
- Tristicha trifaria (Bory ex Willd.) Spreng. subsp. trifaria, indigenous

== Putranjivaceae ==
Family: Putranjivaceae,

=== Drypetes ===
Genus Drypetes:

- Drypetes arguta (Mull.Arg.) Hutch. indigenous
- Drypetes gerrardii Hutch. indigenous
  - Drypetes gerrardii Hutch. var. gerrardii, indigenous
  - Drypetes gerrardii Hutch. var. tomentosa Radcl.-Sm. indigenous
- Drypetes mossambicensis Hutch. indigenous
- Drypetes natalensis (Harv.) Hutch. indigenous
  - Drypetes natalensis (Harv.) Hutch. var. natalensis, indigenous
- Drypetes reticulata Pax, indigenous

== Rhizophoraceae ==
Family: Rhizophoraceae,

=== Bruguiera ===
Genus Bruguiera:

- Bruguiera gymnorhiza (L.) Lam. indigenous

=== Cassipourea ===
Genus Cassipourea:

- Cassipourea flanaganii (Schinz) Alston, endemic
- Cassipourea gerrardii (Schinz) Alston, accepted as Cassipourea malosana (Baker) Alston, present
- Cassipourea gummiflua Tul. indigenous
  - Cassipourea gummiflua Tul. var. verticillata (N.E.Br.) J.Lewis, indigenous
- Cassipourea malosana (Baker) Alston, indigenous
- Cassipourea mossambicensis (Brehmer) Alston, indigenous
- Cassipourea swaziensis Compton, indigenous

=== Ceriops ===
Genus Ceriops:

- Ceriops tagal (Perr.) C.B.Rob. indigenous

=== Rhizophora ===
Genus Rhizophora:

- Rhizophora mucronata Lam. indigenous

== Salicaceae ==
Family: Salicaceae,

=== Casearia ===
Genus Casearia:

- Casearia gladiiformis Mast. indigenous

=== Dovyalis ===
Genus Dovyalis:

- Dovyalis caffra (Hook.f. & Harv.) Warb. indigenous
- Dovyalis longispina (Harv.) Warb. indigenous
- Dovyalis lucida Sim, indigenous
- Dovyalis revoluta J.E.Thom, accepted as Dovyalis zeyheri (Sond.) Warb. present
- Dovyalis rhamnoides (Burch. ex DC.) Burch. & Harv. indigenous
- Dovyalis rotundifolia (Thunb.) Thunb. & Harv. endemic
- Dovyalis zeyheri (Sond.) Warb. indigenous

=== Flacourtia ===
Genus Flacourtia:

- Flacourtia indica (Burm.f.) Merr. indigenous

=== Homalium ===
Genus Homalium:

- Homalium dentatum (Harv.) Warb. indigenous
- Homalium rufescens Benth. endemic
- Homalium subsuperum Sprague, accepted as Homalium dentatum (Harv.) Warb. present

=== Oncoba ===
Genus Oncoba:

- Oncoba spinosa Forssk. indigenous
  - Oncoba spinosa Forssk. subsp. spinosa, indigenous

=== Populus ===
Genus Populus:

- Populus alba L. not indigenous, naturalised, invasive
  - Populus alba L. var. alba, not indigenous, naturalised
- Populus canescens (Aiton) Sm. not indigenous, naturalised, invasive
- Populus deltoides Bartram ex Marshall subsp. deltoides, not indigenous, naturalised, invasive
- Populus nigra L. not indigenous, naturalised
  - Populus nigra L. var. italica Munchh. not indigenous, naturalised, invasive

=== Pseudoscolopia ===
Genus Pseudoscolopia:

- Pseudoscolopia polyantha Gilg, endemic

=== Salix ===
Genus Salix:

- Salix babylonica L. not indigenous, naturalised, invasive
  - Salix babylonica L. var. babylonica, not indigenous, naturalised
- Salix caprea L. not indigenous, naturalised, invasive
- Salix mucronata Thunb. indigenous
  - Salix mucronata Thunb. subsp. capensis (Thunb.) Immelman, accepted as Salix mucronata Thunb. subsp. mucronata, present
  - Salix mucronata Thunb. subsp. hirsuta (Thunb.) Immelman, endemic
  - Salix mucronata Thunb. subsp. mucronata, indigenous
  - Salix mucronata Thunb. subsp. wilmsii (Seemen) Immelman, accepted as Salix mucronata Thunb. subsp. woodii (Seemen) Immelman, present
  - Salix mucronata Thunb. subsp. woodii (Seemen) Immelman, indigenous
- Salix subserrata Willd. accepted as Salix mucronata Thunb. subsp. subserrata (Willd.) R.H.Archer & Jordaan
- Salix x fragilis L. var. fragilis, not indigenous, naturalised, invasive

=== Scolopia ===
Genus Scolopia:

- Scolopia flanaganii (Bolus) Sim, endemic
- Scolopia mundii (Eckl. & Zeyh.) Warb. indigenous
- Scolopia oreophila (Sleumer) Killick, endemic
- Scolopia stolzii Gilg & Sleumer, indigenous
  - Scolopia stolzii Gilg & Sleumer var. stolzii, indigenous
- Scolopia zeyheri (Nees) Harv. indigenous

=== Trimeria ===
Genus Trimeria:

- Trimeria grandifolia (Hochst.) Warb. indigenous
  - Trimeria grandifolia (Hochst.) Warb. subsp. grandifolia, indigenous
- Trimeria trinervis Harv. endemic

== Turneraceae ==
Family: Turneraceae,

=== Afroqueta ===
Genus Afroqueta:

- Afroqueta capensis (Harv.) Thulin & Razafim. indigenous

=== Piriqueta ===
Genus Piriqueta:

- Piriqueta capensis (Harv.) Urb. accepted as Afroqueta capensis (Harv.) Thulin & Razafim. indigenous

=== Streptopetalum ===
Genus Streptopetalum:

- Streptopetalum serratum Hochst. indigenous

=== Tricliceras ===
Genus Tricliceras:

- Tricliceras glanduliferum (Klotzsch) R.Fern. indigenous
- Tricliceras laceratum (Oberm.) Oberm. indigenous
- Tricliceras longepedunculatum (Mast.) R.Fern. indigenous
  - Tricliceras longepedunculatum (Mast.) R.Fern. var. longepedunculatum, indigenous
- Tricliceras mossambicense (A.Fern. & R.Fern.) R.Fern. indigenous
- Tricliceras schinzii (Urb.) R.Fern. indigenous
  - Tricliceras schinzii (Urb.) R.Fern. subsp. schinzii var. juttae, indigenous
- Tricliceras tanacetifolium (Klotzsch) R.Fern. indigenous

== Violaceae ==
Family: Violaceae,

=== Hybanthus ===
Genus Hybanthus:

- Hybanthus capensis (Thunb.) Engl. indigenous
- Hybanthus densifolius Engl. indigenous
- Hybanthus enneaspermus (L.) F.Muell. not indigenous, naturalised
  - Hybanthus enneaspermus (L.) F.Muell. var. caffer (Sond.) N.Robson, not indigenous, naturalised
  - Hybanthus enneaspermus (L.) F.Muell. var. enneaspermus, not indigenous, naturalised
  - Hybanthus enneaspermus (L.) F.Muell. var. serratus Engl. not indigenous, naturalised
- Hybanthus parviflorus (L.f.) Baill. not indigenous, naturalised

=== Rinorea ===
Genus Rinorea:

- Rinorea angustifolia (Thouars) Baill. indigenous
  - Rinorea angustifolia (Thouars) Baill. subsp. natalensis (Engl.) Grey-Wilson, indigenous
- Rinorea domatiosa A.E.van Wyk, endemic
- Rinorea ilicifolia (Welw. ex Oliv.) Kuntze, indigenous
  - Rinorea ilicifolia (Welw. ex Oliv.) Kuntze subsp. ilicifolia, indigenous
  - Rinorea ilicifolia (Welw. ex Oliv.) Kuntze subsp. ilicifolia var. ilicifolia, indigenous

=== Viola ===
Genus Viola:

- Viola abyssinica Steud. ex Oliv. indigenous
- Viola arvensis Murray, not indigenous, naturalised
- Viola decumbens L.f. indigenous
  - Viola decumbens L.f. var. decumbens, endemic
  - Viola decumbens L.f. var. scrotiformis (DC.) Jessop, endemic
- Viola hederacea Labill. not indigenous, naturalised
- Viola priceana Pollard, not indigenous, naturalised
- Viola tricolor L. not indigenous, naturalised
