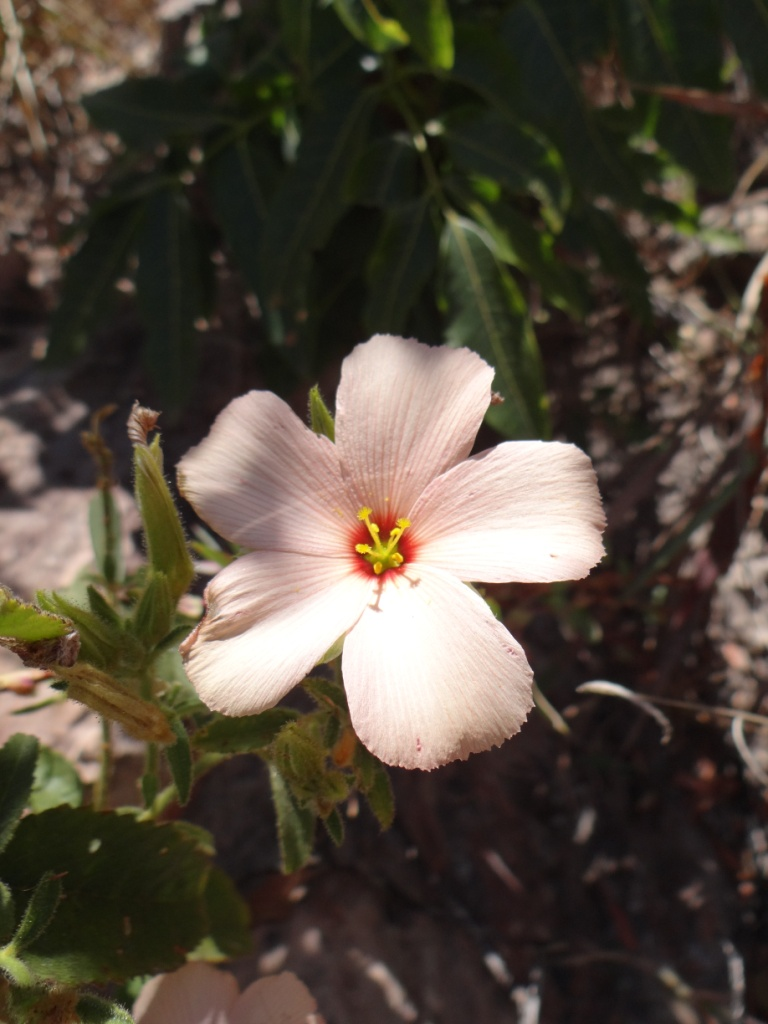
- Flower of Piriqueta duarteana

Scientific classification
- Kingdom: Plantae
- Clade: Tracheophytes
- Clade: Angiosperms
- Clade: Eudicots
- Clade: Rosids
- Order: Malpighiales
- Family: Passifloraceae
- Subfamily: Turneroideae
- Genus: Piriqueta; Aubl.

Type species
- Piriqueta villosa Aublet

Species
- 46 species, see text
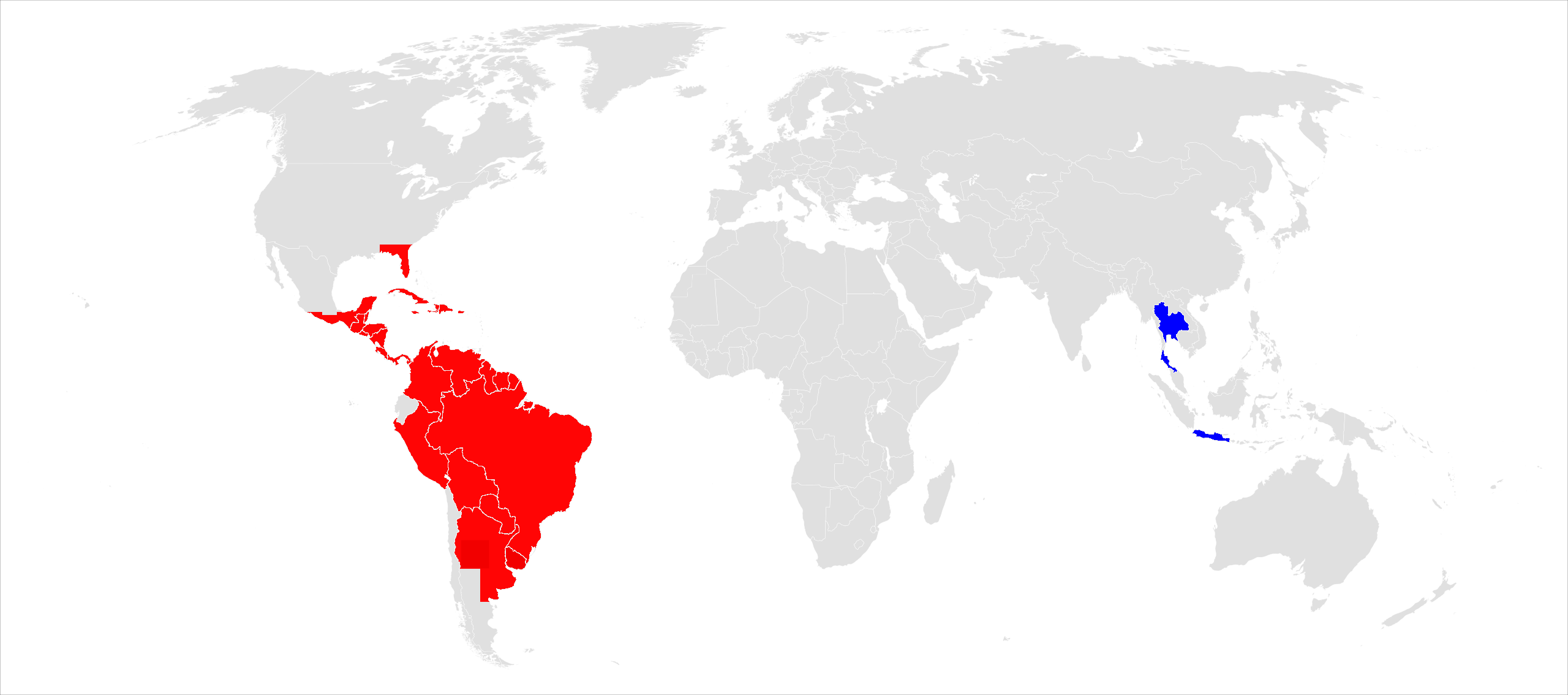
- Distribution of Piriqueta as of 2023. Natural (red) and introduced (blue)

Synonyms
- Burcardia Schreb.; Burghartia Scop.

= Piriqueta =

Genus of plants

Piriqueta is a genus of flowering plants belonging to Turneroideae (Passifloraceae).

== Description ==
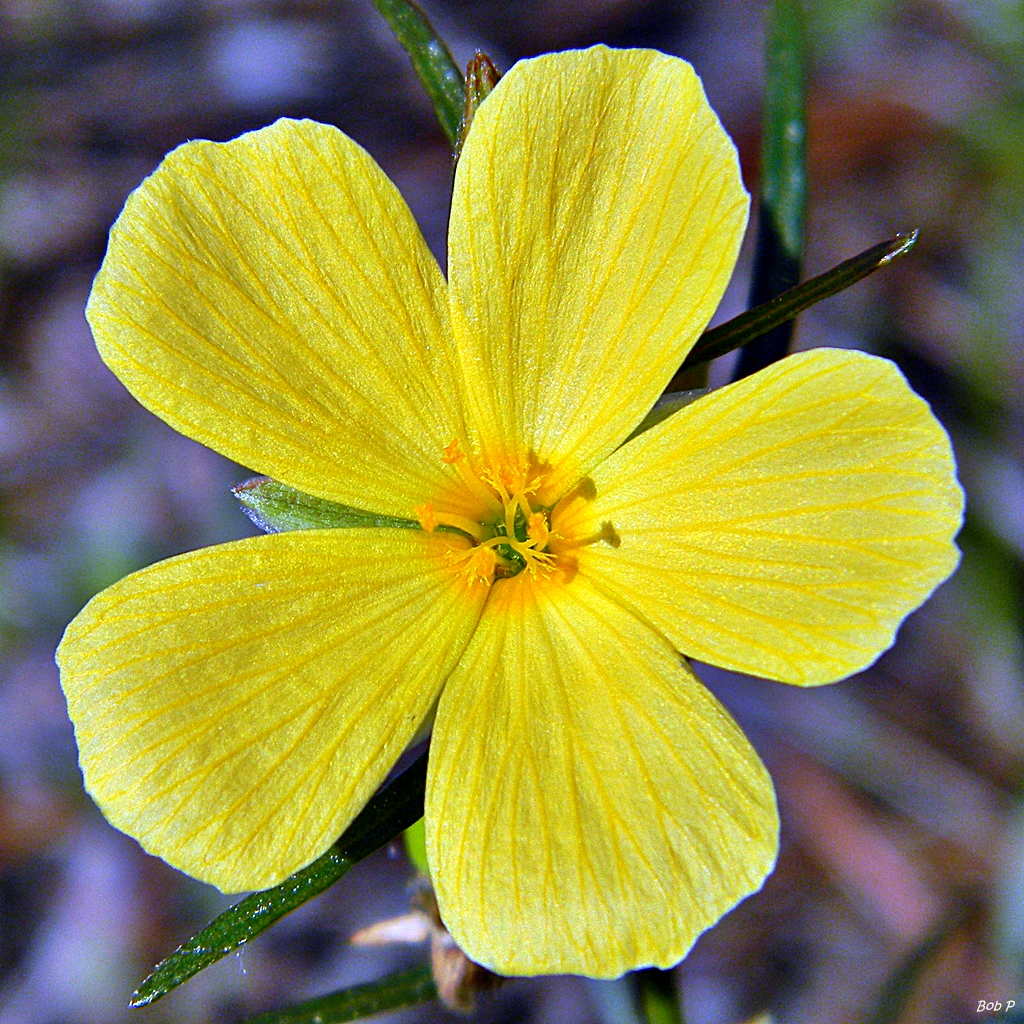
Flower of Piriqueta caroliniana

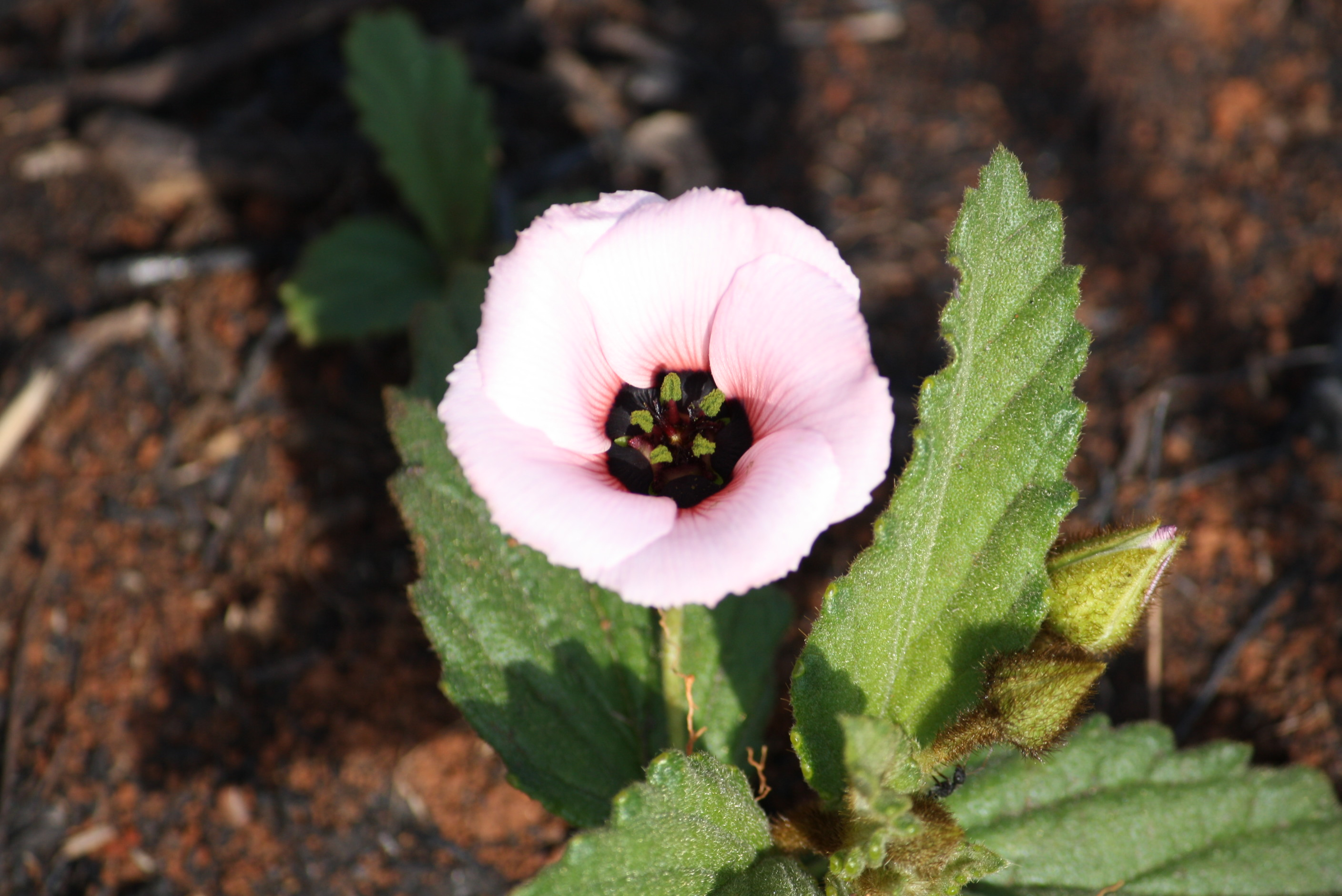
Flower of Piriqueta suborbicularis

Piriqueta is a genus of herbs or subshrub dicots.

=== Morphology ===
Most members of Piriqueta are perennial or suffrutic herbs, there are some shrubs and some annual species.

All members of Piriqueta have the same floral organization: short calyx tubes that are attached to petal claws, coronas, and filaments. The peduncle and pedicels are free. Seeds are reticulate in all species, two thirds of the species have puberulent seeds, others have glabrous seeds. They are generally hairy, though some only have hair in the floral regions.

Over half of Piriqueta species have setiform glandular hairs and tuberculate fruits, some with axillary inflorescences.

Various members of Piriqueta, see list below, have a unique reproductive system called distyly, in which, two floral morphs are present which differ in their placement of anthers and style length. More rarely, some species show tristyly in which three floral morphs are present.

=== Karyotype ===
30% of Piriqueta are polyploids. The basic chromosome number is x=7.

== Taxonomy ==
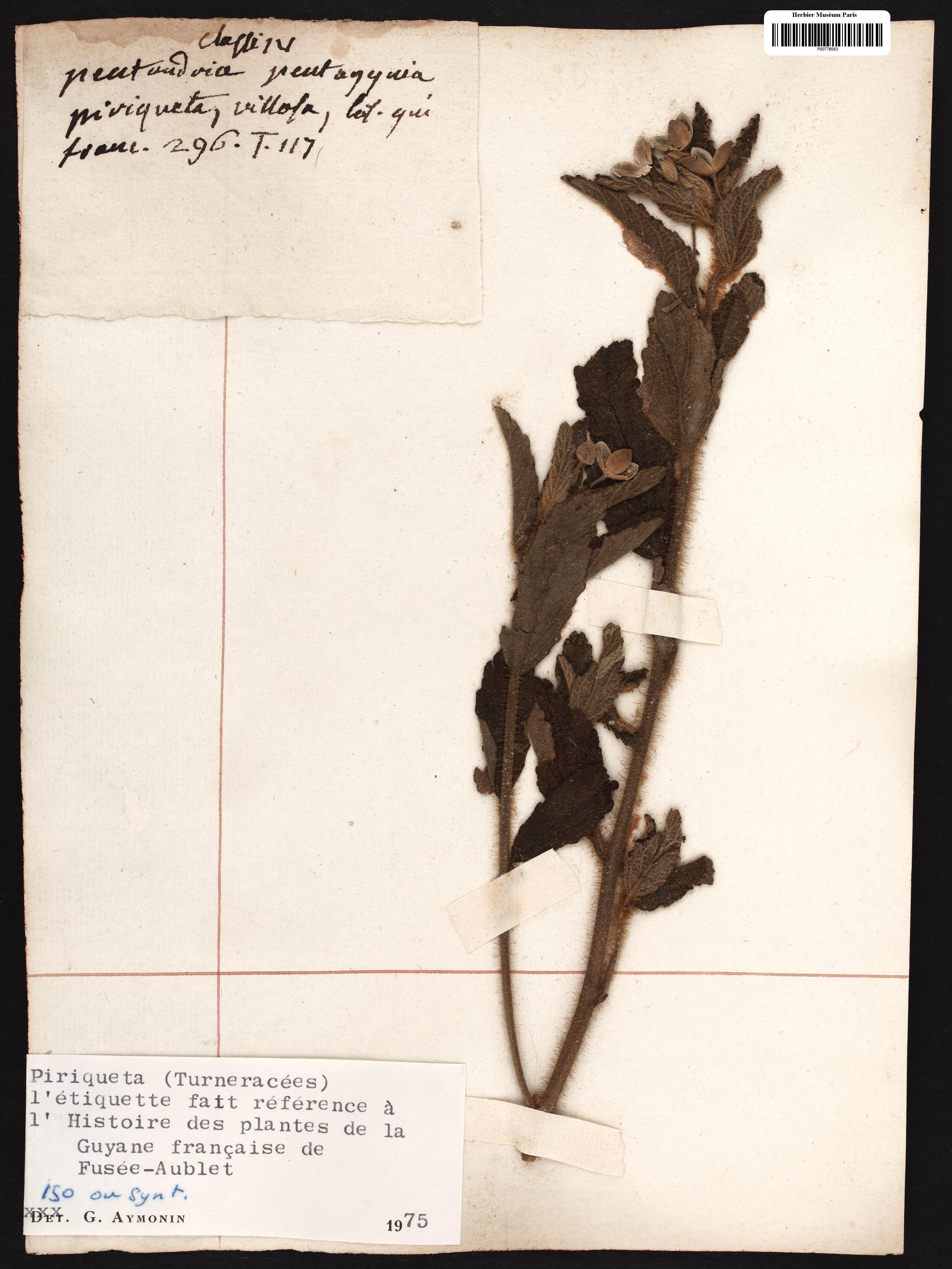
Original plate of Piriqueta villosa used by Aublet to describe the genus.

Piriqueta was originally described in 1775 by J. F. B. Fusée Aublet in Histoire des plantes de la Guiane Françoise, 1877. In this book, he describes Piriqueta villosa. Aublet describes P. villosa as being deciduous, with ovate hairy leaflets, having five "scaly" petals with cup alternation, five filaments, ovate and bilocular anthers, five six-branched pistils with flat fleshy wide stigmas, and being covered in red stiff hairs.

In 1777, Giovanni Antonio Scopoli would publish the genus under Burghartia and would place the genus in the tribe Sauvagesieae of Ochnaceae.

In 1789, Johann Christian Daniel von Schreber would publish the genus under Burcardia. The description is similar to that of Aublet's with the exception of the petals described as "heart" shaped.

Scopoli's and Schreber's descriptions both refer to Piriqueta as a synonym, neither provided type species in their descriptions.

== Distribution and habitat ==
Members of Piriqueta have native ranges throughout tropical and subtropical regions of North, Central, and South America.

Various members of Piriqueta have been introduced to Java, Malaysia, and Thailand.

== Species ==
As of 2023, there are 46 accepted species of Piriqueta.

- Piriqueta abairana Arbo^{2}
- Piriqueta araguaiana Arbo^{2}
- Piriqueta asperifolia Arbo^{2}
- Piriqueta assurensis Urb.^{1,2}
- Piriqueta aurea (Cambess.) Urb.^{2}
- Piriqueta breviseminata Arbo^{2}
- Piriqueta caiapoensis Arbo^{2}
- Piriqueta carnea Urb.^{2}
- Piriqueta cistoides (L.) Griseb. ssp. cistoides ^{2}
- Piriqueta cistoides (Walter) Arbo ssp. caroliniana ^{1}
- Piriqueta constellata Arbo^{2}
- Piriqueta corumbensis Moura^{2}
- Piriqueta crenata L.Rocha, I.M.Souza & Arbo
- Piriqueta cristobaliae Arbo^{2}
- Piriqueta densiflora Urb.^{2}
- Piriqueta dentata Arbo^{2}
- Piriqueta douradinha Arbo^{2}
- Piriqueta duarteana (Cambess.) Urb.^{2}
- Piriqueta emasensis Arbo^{2}
- Piriqueta flammea (Suess.) Arbo^{2}
- Piriqueta grandifolia (Urb.) Arbo^{2}
- Piriqueta guianensis N.E.Br.^{2,3}
- Piriqueta hapala Arbo^{1}
- Piriqueta lourteigiae Arbo^{2}
- Piriqueta mesoamericana Arbo^{2}
- Piriqueta mexicana Fryxell & S.D.Koch^{1}
- Piriqueta morongii Rolfe^{1,2}
- Piriqueta mortonii S.D.Koch & Fryxell^{1}
- Piriqueta nanuzae Arbo^{2}
- Piriqueta nitida Urb.^{2}
- Piriqueta ochroleuca Urb.^{2}
- Piriqueta pampeana Cabreira & Miotto
- Piriqueta plicata Urb.^{2}
- Piriqueta racemosa (Jacq.) Sweet^{1,2}
- Piriqueta revoluta Arbo^{2?}
- Piriqueta rosea (Cambess.) Urb.^{2}
- Piriqueta sarae Arbo^{2}
- Piriqueta scabrida Urb.^{2}
- Piriqueta sidifolia Urb. ssp. sidifolia^{2}
- Piriqueta sidifolia Urb. ssp. multiflora^{2}
- Piriqueta suborbicularis (A.St.-Hil. & Naudin) Arbo^{2}
- Piriqueta subsessilis Urb.^{2}
- Piriqueta sulfurea Urb. & Rolfe^{2}
- Piriqueta tamberlikii (Cambess.) Arbo ssp. rotindifolia^{2}
- Piriqueta tamberlikii Urb. ssp. tamberlikii^{2}
- Piriqueta taubatensis (Urb.) Arbo^{2}
- Piriqueta undulata Urb.^{2}
- Piriqueta venezuelana Arbo^{1?}
- Piriqueta viscosa Griseb.^{1}

Notes on the number of floral morphs

1,2,3 denote the number of floral morphs (1 = homostylous, 2 = distylous, 3 = tristylous) ? Denotes uncertain annotations. Those unannotated are missing data.

== Formerly placed in the genus ==
- Afroqueta capensis (Harv.) Thulin & Razafim. as Piriqueta capensis (Harv.) Urb.
- Adenoa cubensis (Britton & P.Wilson) Arbo as Piriqueta cubensis Britton & P.Wilson
- Arboa antsingyae (Arbo) Thulin & Razafim as Piriqueta antsingyae Capuron
- Arboa berneriana (Tul.) Thulin & Razafim as Piriqueta berneriana (Tul.) Urb.
- Arboa integrifolia (Claverie) Thulin & Razafim as Piriqueta integrifolia (Claverie) Capuron and Piriqueta mandrarensis Humbert
- Arboa madagascariensis (O.Hoffm.) Thulin & Razafim as Piriqueta madagascariensis Urb.
- Erblichia odorata Seem as Piriqueta odorata (Seem.) Urb. and Piriqueta xylocarpa Sprague & L.Riley
