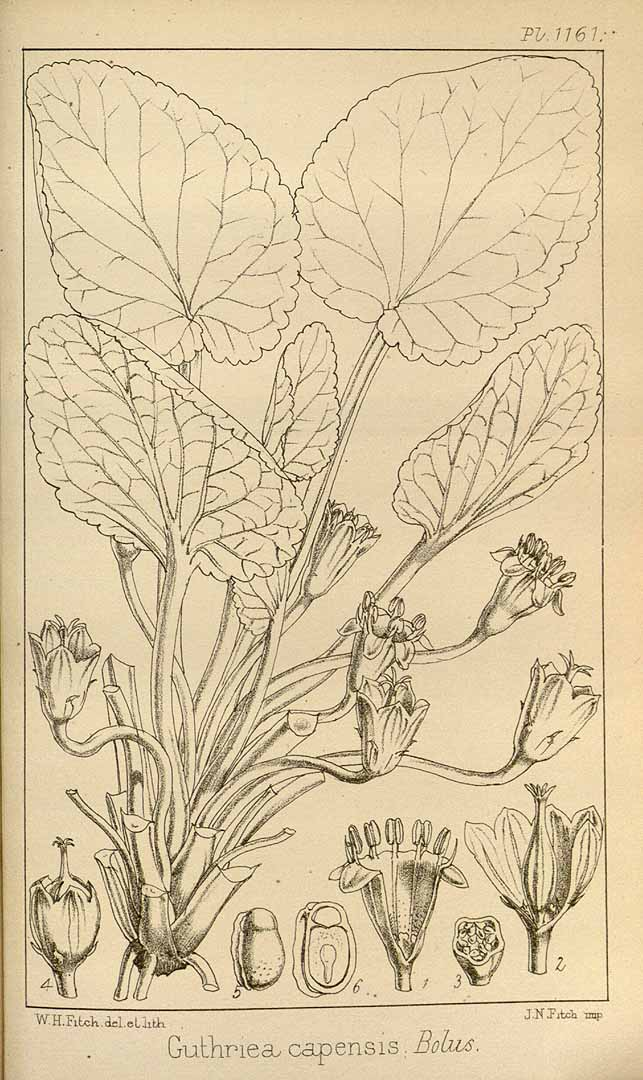

Scientific classification
- Kingdom: Plantae
- Clade: Embryophytes
- Clade: Tracheophytes
- Clade: Angiosperms
- Clade: Eudicots
- Clade: Rosids
- Order: Malpighiales
- Family: Achariaceae
- Genus: Guthriea; Bolus
- Species: G. capensis

Binomial name
- Guthriea capensis Bolus

= Guthriea =

Genus of flowering plants

Guthriea capensis is an acaulescent perennial herb endemic to South Africa and occurring in cool and damp sites facing south or east in the mountains of the Cape Province, Lesotho and KwaZulu-Natal. Its genus Guthriea is monotypic and was named after the botanist and mathematician Francis Guthrie by his friend the botanist Harry Bolus.

This ground-hugging species with a rhizome and fleshy roots forms a compact rosette of some 20-30 broadly elliptic or cordate discolorous leaves with crenate margins, measuring about 50 x 75 mm, glossy above with deeply indented venation hiding creamy-green flowers which are close to the ground, solitary and stalked.

Its primary pollinator is a reptile, the Drakensberg crag lizard (Pseudocordylus subviridis), a rare association, the only other plant whose primary pollinator is also reptilian (Phelsuma geckos) is Trochetia blackburniana from Mauritius. The lizards are attracted by the scent of a nectar component safranal, a cyclic terpenic aldehyde.

Guthriea belongs to the family Achariaceae, a family which now includes various species previously placed in the obsolete family Flacourtiaceae. Other related species include: Kiggelaria africana, Rawsonia lucida and Xylotheca kraussiana.

== Description ==
"Acaulescent perennial herbs with a subhorizontal rhizome and fleshy roots. Leaves rosulate, simple, ovate or cordate, petiolate, discolorous, crenate. Flowers solitary, pedicelled. Male flowers: sepals 5, linear, almost as long as corolla and adnate to it for almost its whole length; corolla 5-lobed, profusely veined, tube deeply campanulate, lobes shorter than tube, reflexed; glands 5, fleshy, situated at base of corolla tube; stamens 5, filaments arising in throat of corolla, shorter than anthers, flattened, anthers didymous with broad connective, pectinate. Female flowers: sepals 4 or 5, linear, adnate to corolla for half their length; corolla 4- or 5-lobed, tube campanulate, lobes much shorter than tube, transversely oblong, erect; glands 4 or 5, fleshy, situated at base of corolla tube; ovary sessile, with 10-15 ovules on 4 or 5 parietal placentas; style broadly linear, 4- or 5-lobed. Fruit a 4- or 5-valved capsule, enclosed in persistent corolla. Seeds several, ellipsoid, arillate."

The Achariaceae is a small family of perennial, monoecious and sympetalous dicotyledons endemic to southern Africa. The family comprises three monotypic genera of diverse growth habit and habitat: Acharia tragodes Thunb., a sparsely branched, subherbaceous shrublet of valley bushveld centered in the Eastern Cape; Ceratiosicyos laevis (Thunb.) A.Meeuse, a herbaceous, non-tendriliferous twiner from forest margins, particularly along the eastern escarpment of the country, and Guthriea capensis Bolus, a rosette plant with underground rootstock occurring in open grassland on the southern Drakensberg and in sheltered niches among rocks on high mountains of the Karoo (Dahlgren and Van Wyk 1988). In vegetative morphology and anatomy the genera also differ markedly, but the monoecious breeding system, the hypogynous flowers with sympetalous corollas and the swollen trichomes on the anthers clearly knit the taxa together

— Dahlgren and Van Wyk, 1988
