= Streptopetalum hildebrandtii =

Scientific classification
- Kingdom: Plantae
- Clade: Tracheophytes
- Clade: Angiosperms
- Clade: Eudicots
- Clade: Rosids
- Order: Malpighiales
- Family: Passifloraceae
- Genus: Streptopetalum
- Species: S. hildebrandtii

Binomial name
- Streptopetalum hildebrandtii Urb.

Synonyms
- 'Wormskioldia hildebrandtii' Urb. & Rolfe

Species of flowering plant

Streptopetalum hildebrandtii is a perennial herb native to the grasslands of Kenya and Tanzania, Africa. It is found at altitudes of 1000-1250m.

Streptopetalum hildebrandtii grows up to 0.4 m tall, has 3–7 cm leaves, and homostylous yellow and orange flowers.
