= Streptopetalum graminifolium =

Scientific classification
- Kingdom: Plantae
- Clade: Tracheophytes
- Clade: Angiosperms
- Clade: Eudicots
- Clade: Rosids
- Order: Malpighiales
- Family: Passifloraceae
- Genus: Streptopetalum
- Species: S. graminifolium

Binomial name
- Streptopetalum graminifolium Urb.

Species of flowering plant

Streptopetalum graminifolium is a subshrub native to western Tanzania, Africa. It reaches heights of 0.4 meters, has 1.5 mm long leaves, and distylous racemose flowers.

As of 1997, S. graminifolium is considered threatened, but the extent has not been determined.
