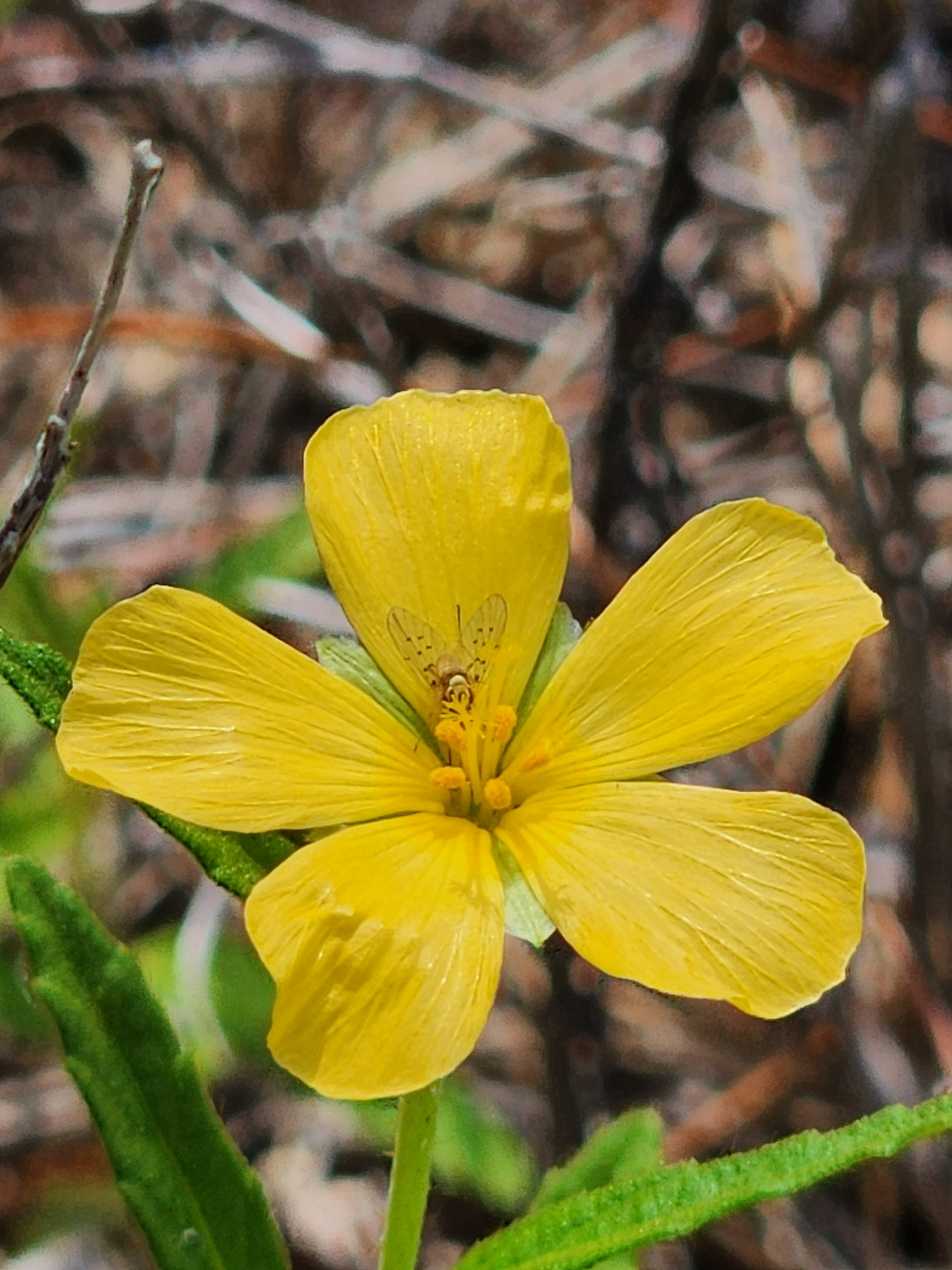

Conservation status
- Secure (NatureServe)

Scientific classification
- Kingdom: Plantae
- Clade: Embryophytes
- Clade: Tracheophytes
- Clade: Spermatophytes
- Clade: Angiosperms
- Clade: Eudicots
- Clade: Rosids
- Order: Malpighiales
- Family: Passifloraceae
- Genus: Piriqueta
- Species: P. cistoides

Binomial name
- Piriqueta cistoides (L.) Griseb

Synonyms
- Piriqueta cistoides var. genuina Urb.; Turnera cistoides L.

= Piriqueta cistoides =

Species of flowering plant

Piriqueta cistoides, also known as pitted stripeseed or morning buttercup, is a species of perennial flower found in the southeastern region of the United States.

== Description ==
Piriqueta cistoides stands at a height between 15 to 50 cm (0.5 to 1.6 ft), forming colonies from where it sprouts at its roots. The leaves are alternately arranged and possess toothed margins. They are oblong to lanceolate in shape, and range in length from 2.5 to 5 cm (1 to 2 in) and in width from 0.5 to 1.7 cm (0.2 to 0.7 in).

When inflorescence occurs the blooms possess 5 petals, ranging from 1.5 to 2 cm (0.6 to 0.8 in) in length and bright orange to yellow in coloration. Blooms occur from the late spring into autumn, April through October. The seeds of P. cistoides are obovate in shape, 1.8 to 2 mm (0.07 to 0.08 in) in length, and tan or grey in color.

== Distribution and habitat ==
Within the United States' P. cistoides' range encompasses South Carolina, Georgia, Florida, and Alabama.

P. cistoides is considered to be a facultative species. It is commonly found in habitats such as pine flatwoods and sandhills, and prefers dry, well-drained environments with high levels of sun.

== Ecology ==
Piriqueta cistoides is insect pollinated and is recorded to have been visited in northern Florida by Augochloropsis metallica, Augochloropsis sumptuosa, Lasioglossum apopkense, Lasioglossum pectorale, Lasioglossum reticulatum, Lasioglossum weemsi/leviense, and Megachile petulans.
