= Arboa antsingyae =

Conservation status
- Critically Endangered (IUCN 3.1)

Scientific classification
- Kingdom: Plantae
- Clade: Tracheophytes
- Clade: Angiosperms
- Clade: Eudicots
- Clade: Rosids
- Order: Malpighiales
- Family: Passifloraceae
- Genus: Arboa
- Species: A. antsingyae

Binomial name
- Arboa antsingyae (Arbo) Thulin & Razafim.
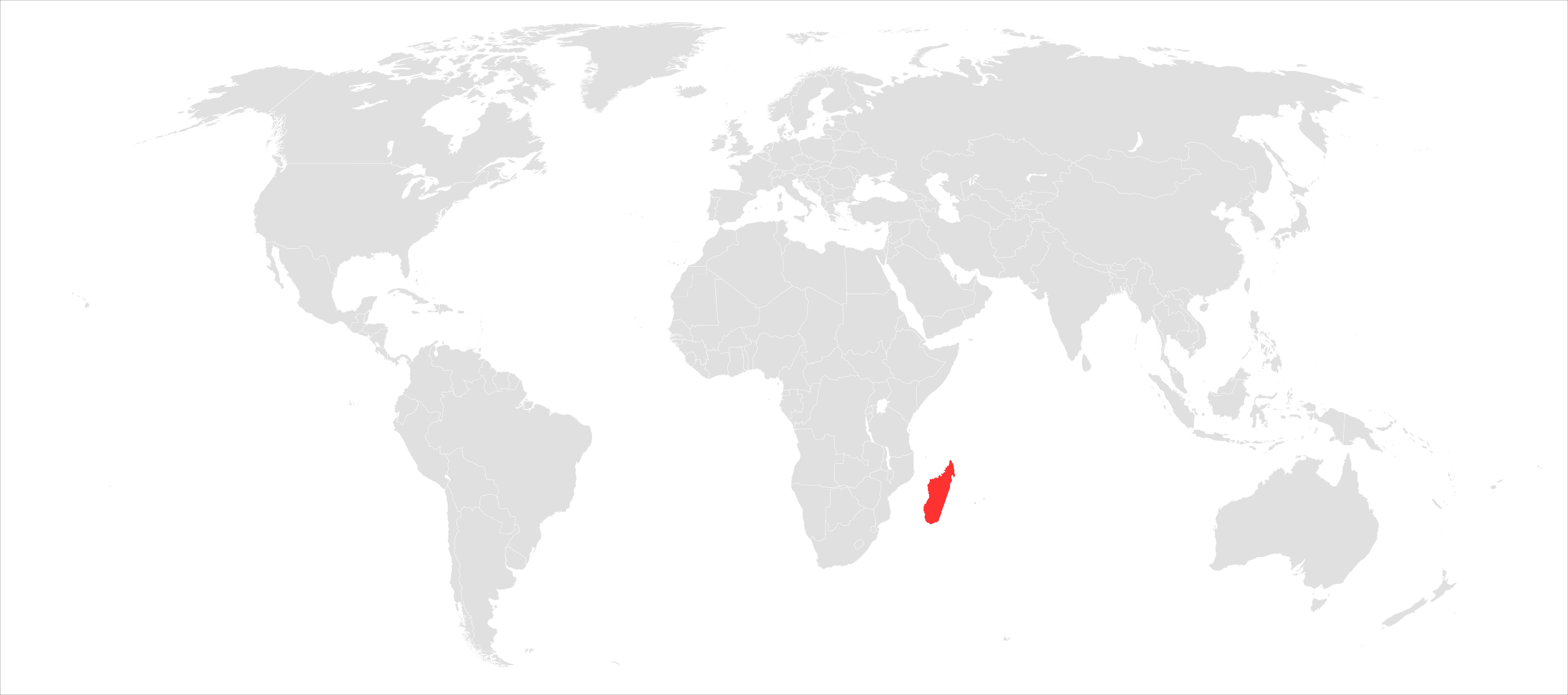

Synonyms
- Erblichia antsingyae Arbo; Piriqueta antsingyae Capuron

Species of flowering plant

Arboa antsingyae is a tree found in western Madagascar. While A. antsingyae is currently classified as critically endangered, it is currently unknown if A. antsingyae is extant as the last observation of the species was in 1952. Previously it was classified as Erblichia antsingyae and Piriqueta antsingyae, however, phylogenetic analysis suggested reclassification of the species in Arboa.
