= Great Fish River Mouth Wetland Nature Reserve =

Wetland nature reserve in the Eastern Cape

- Interactive map of Great Fish River Mouth Wetland Nature Reserve
- Location: Eastern Cape, South Africa
- Nearest city: Port Alfred
- Coordinates: 33°28′05″S 27°03′50″E
- Area: 210.85 ha (521.0 acres)
- Established: 19 February 1988

Great Fish River Mouth Wetland Nature Reserve is a wetland nature reserve that lies at the confluence of the Kap River, on the southern bank of the Great Fish River near Port Alfred. Neighbouring it is the Kap River Nature Reserve.

== History ==
This 210.85 ha (521.0 acres) reserve was designated in 1988.

== See also ==
- List of protected areas of South Africa
