= Piriqueta abairana =

Scientific classification
- Kingdom: Plantae
- Clade: Tracheophytes
- Clade: Angiosperms
- Clade: Eudicots
- Clade: Rosids
- Order: Malpighiales
- Family: Passifloraceae
- Genus: Piriqueta
- Species: P. abairana

Binomial name
- Piriqueta abairana Arbo
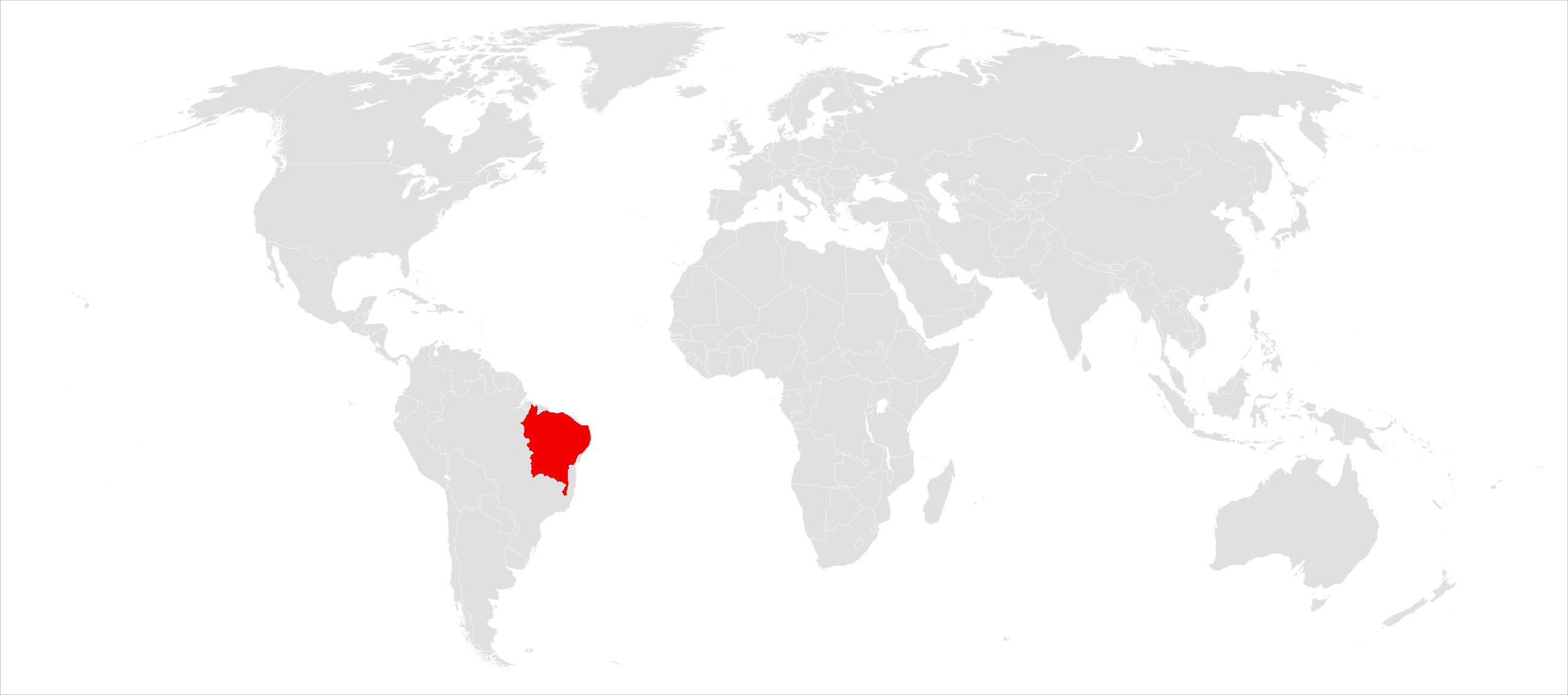

Species of flowering plant

Piriqueta abairana is a shrub with orange distylous flowers in the genus Piriqueta of Turneroideae (Passifloraceae). It natively grows in Chapada Diamantina between 1,000 - 1,700 m.

It was originally described in 1999 by Maria Arbo. Morphologically it is similar to P. flammea and P. sarae, but differs in the number and length of inflorescence. It is distylous with salmon or orange flowers. It blooms between December and July.

As of 2017, P. abairana is classified as an endangered species.
