= Kap River Nature Reserve =

Riverine nature reserve in the Eastern Cape

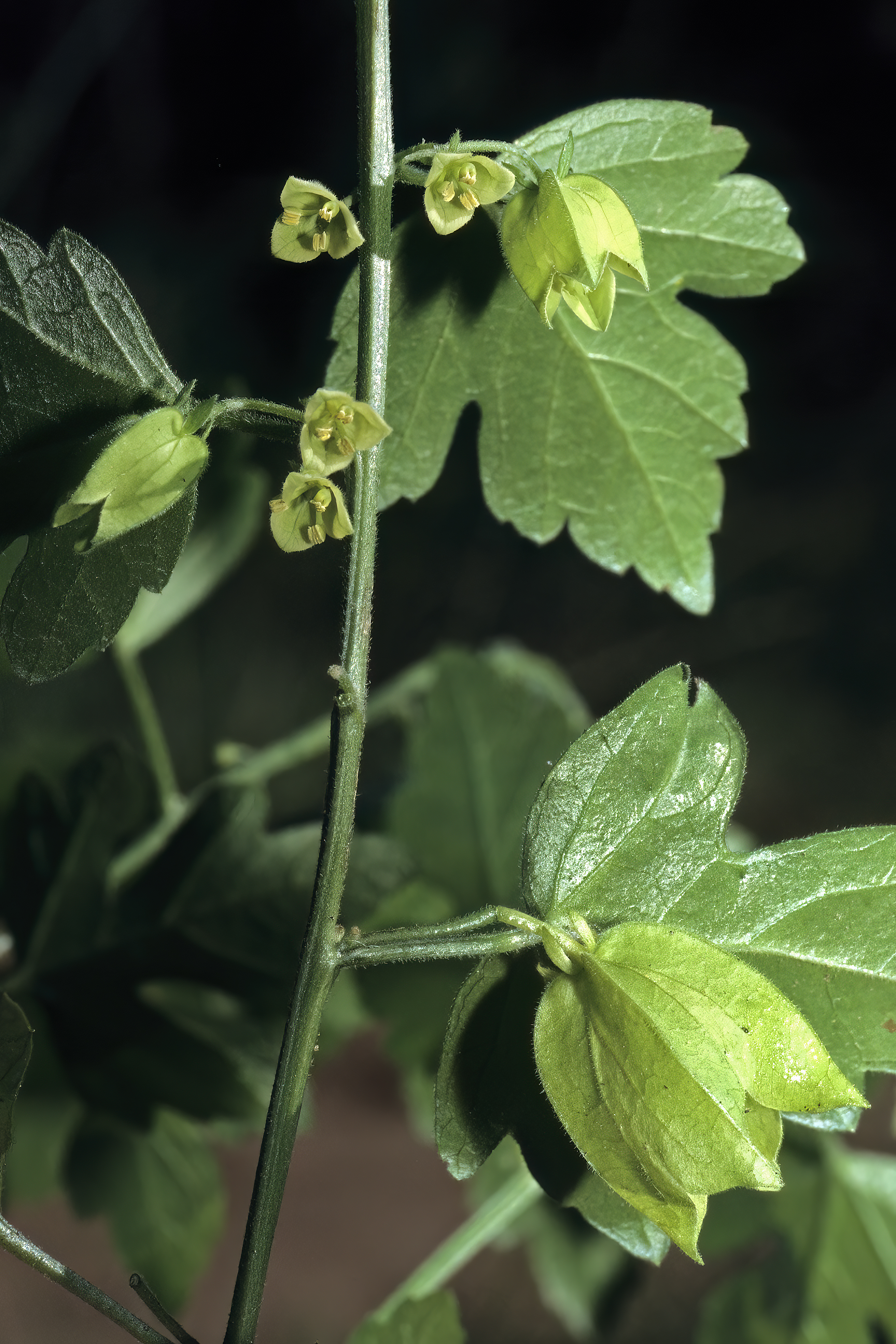
- The endemic Acharia tragodes in the reserve
- Interactive map of Kap River Nature Reserve
- Location: Eastern Cape, South Africa
- Nearest city: Port Alfred
- Coordinates: 33°28′05″S 27°03′50″E
- Area: 262.75 ha (649.3 acres)
- Established: 23 November 1990
- Website: Kap River Conservancy

Kap River Nature Reserve is a nature reserve that lies between the confluence of the Kap River and the southern bank of the Great Fish River near Port Alfred. Neighbouring it is the Great Fish River Mouth Wetland Nature Reserve.

== History ==
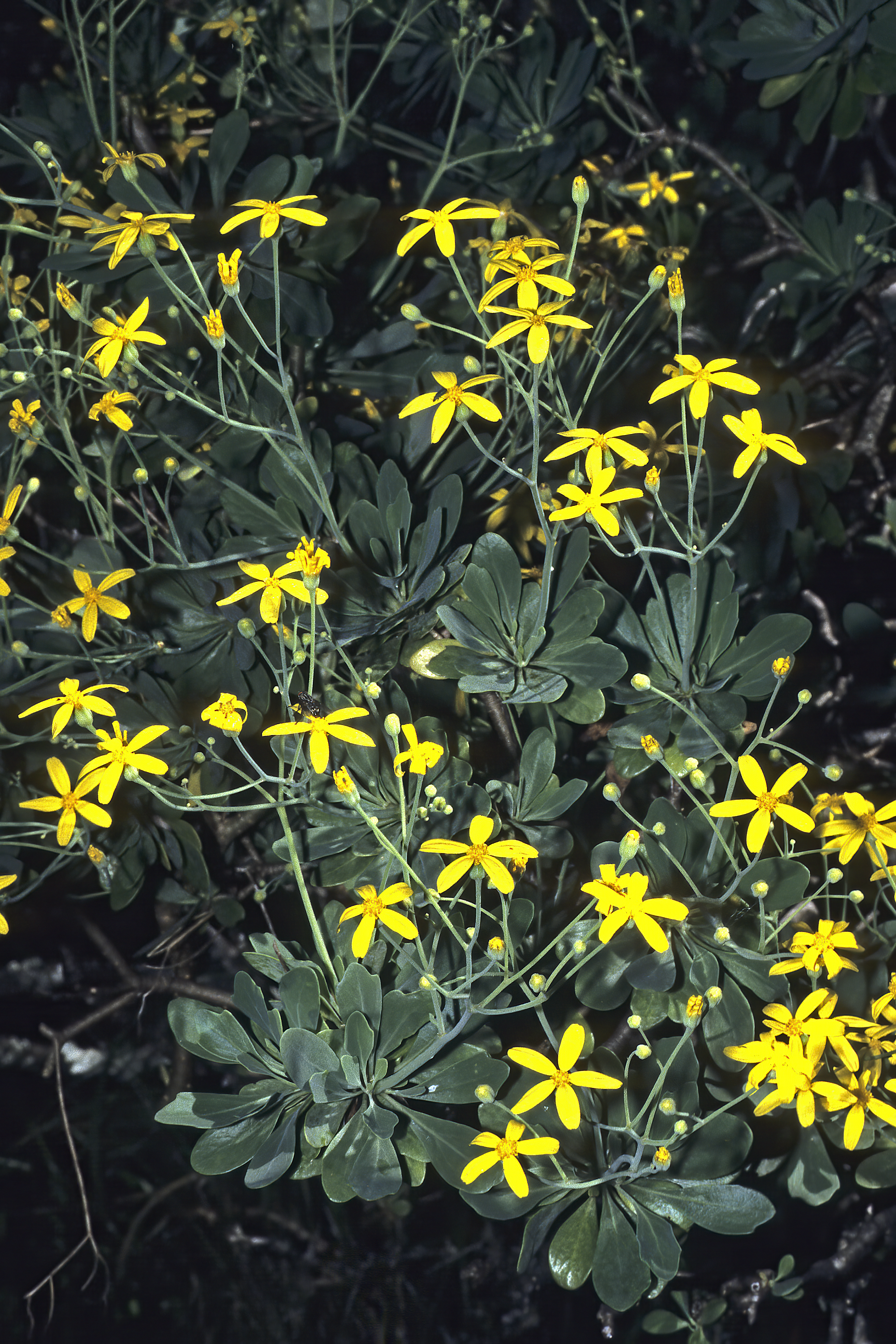
Eastern Cape endemic, Othonna triplinervia

This 262.75 ha (649.3 acres) reserve was designated in 1990.

== Biodiversity ==
=== Birds ===
The reserve hosts 300 species of birds, including African finfoot, black-headed heron, crowned eagle, hornbill, lanner falcon, martial eagle and rock kestrel.

=== Mammals ===
Mammals found in the reserve are Cape bushbuck, duiker, giraffe, impala, red hartebeest, reedbuck, warthog and zebra.

== Activities ==
There's hiking, mountain biking, canoeing and fishing (with permits) at the reserve.

== See also ==
- List of protected areas of South Africa
