= Streptopetalum arenarium =

Scientific classification
- Kingdom: Plantae
- Clade: Tracheophytes
- Clade: Angiosperms
- Clade: Eudicots
- Clade: Rosids
- Order: Malpighiales
- Family: Passifloraceae
- Genus: Streptopetalum
- Species: S. arenarium

Binomial name
- Streptopetalum arenarium Thulin

Species of flowering plant

Streptopetalum arenarium is a subshrub native to Somalia, Africa. It is distylous, grows up to 0.5 meters tall, has elliptic to ovate leaves, and racemes flowers. It was originally described by Mats Thulin.
