= Arboa =

Scientific classification
- Kingdom: Plantae
- Clade: Tracheophytes
- Clade: Angiosperms
- Clade: Eudicots
- Clade: Rosids
- Order: Malpighiales
- Family: Passifloraceae
- Subfamily: Turneroideae
- Genus: Arboa; Thulin & Razafim.
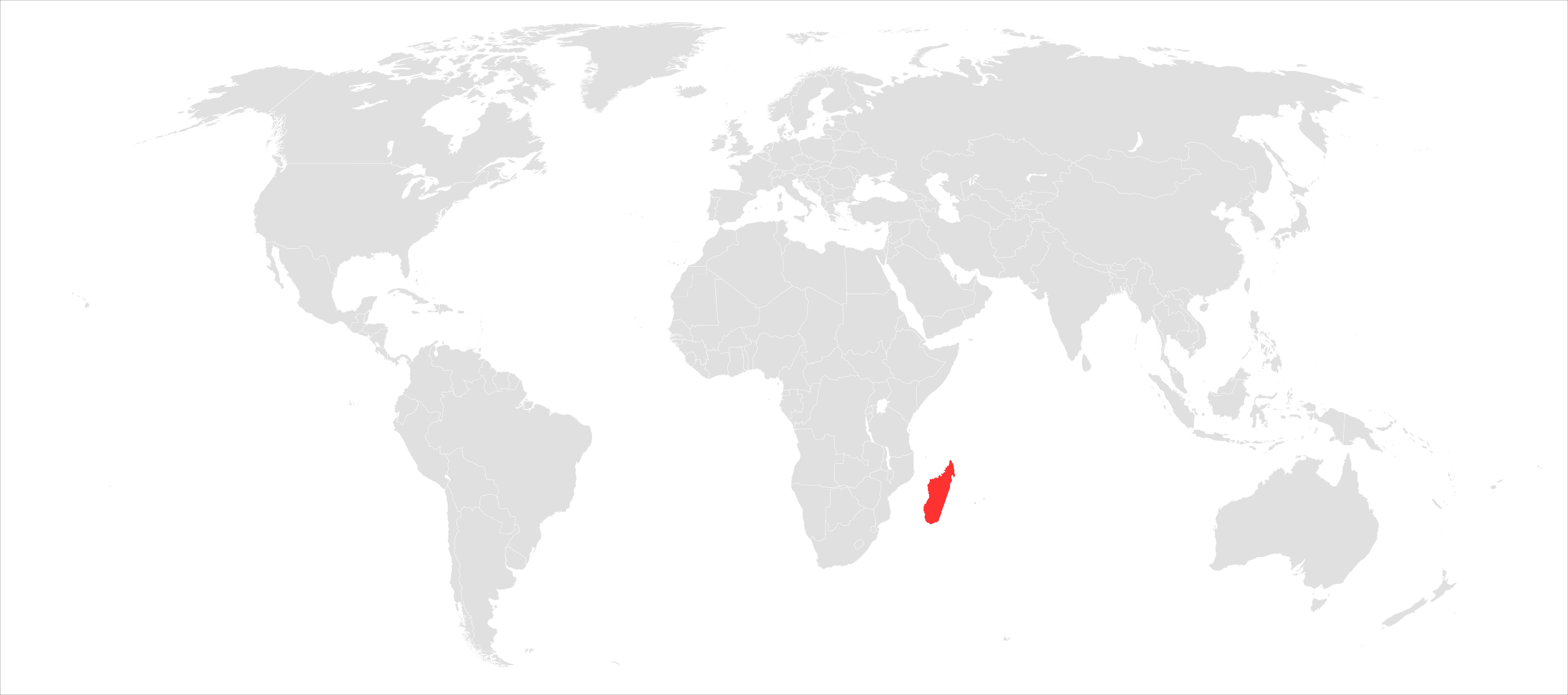

Genus of flowering plants

Arboa is a genus of flowering plants belonging to the family Passifloraceae.

Its native range is Madagascar.

Species:

- Arboa antsingyae (Arbo) Thulin & Razafim.
- Arboa berneriana (Tul.) Thulin & Razafim.
- Arboa integrifolia (Claverie) Thulin & Razafim.
- Arboa madagascariensis (O.Hoffm.) Thulin & Razafim.
