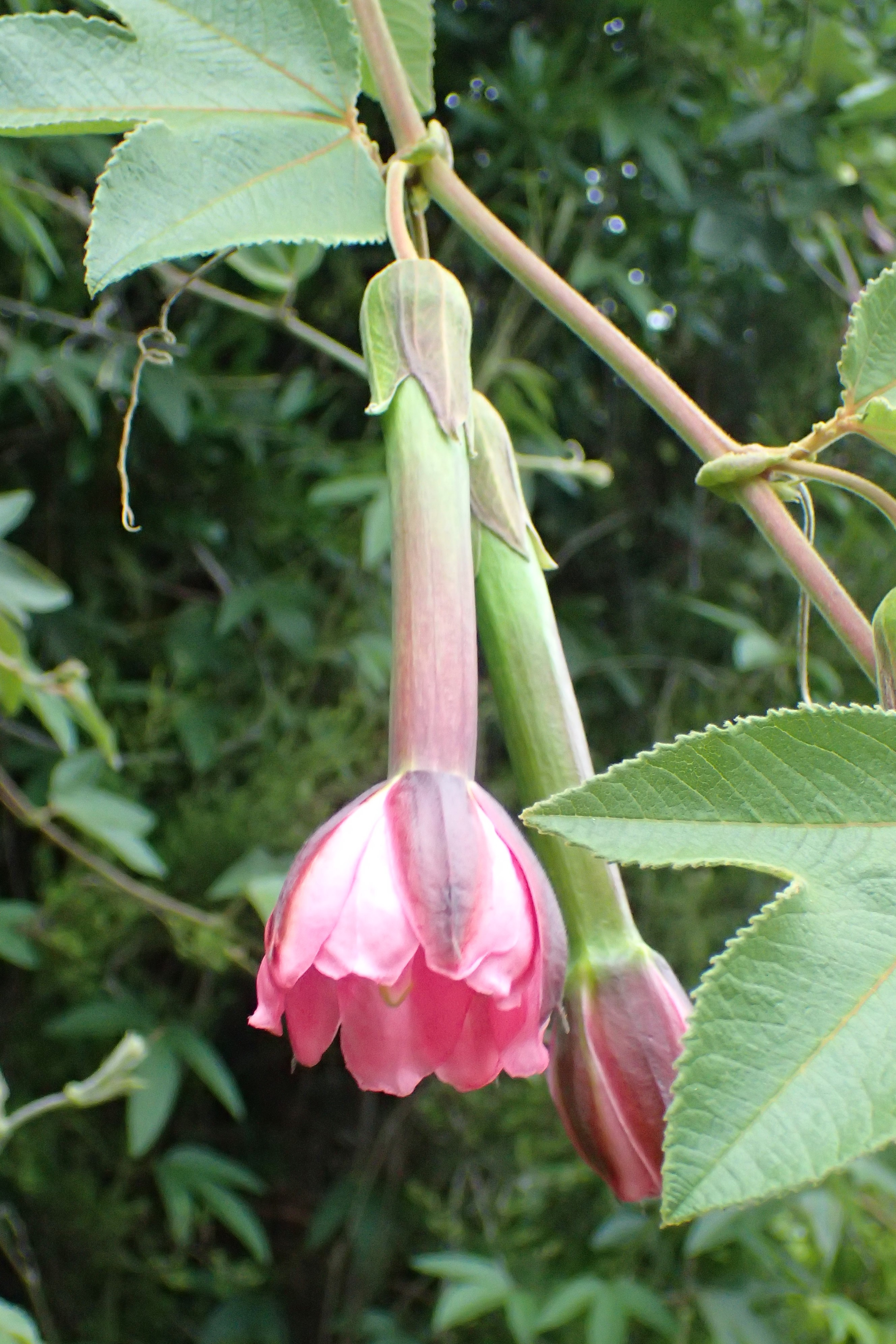

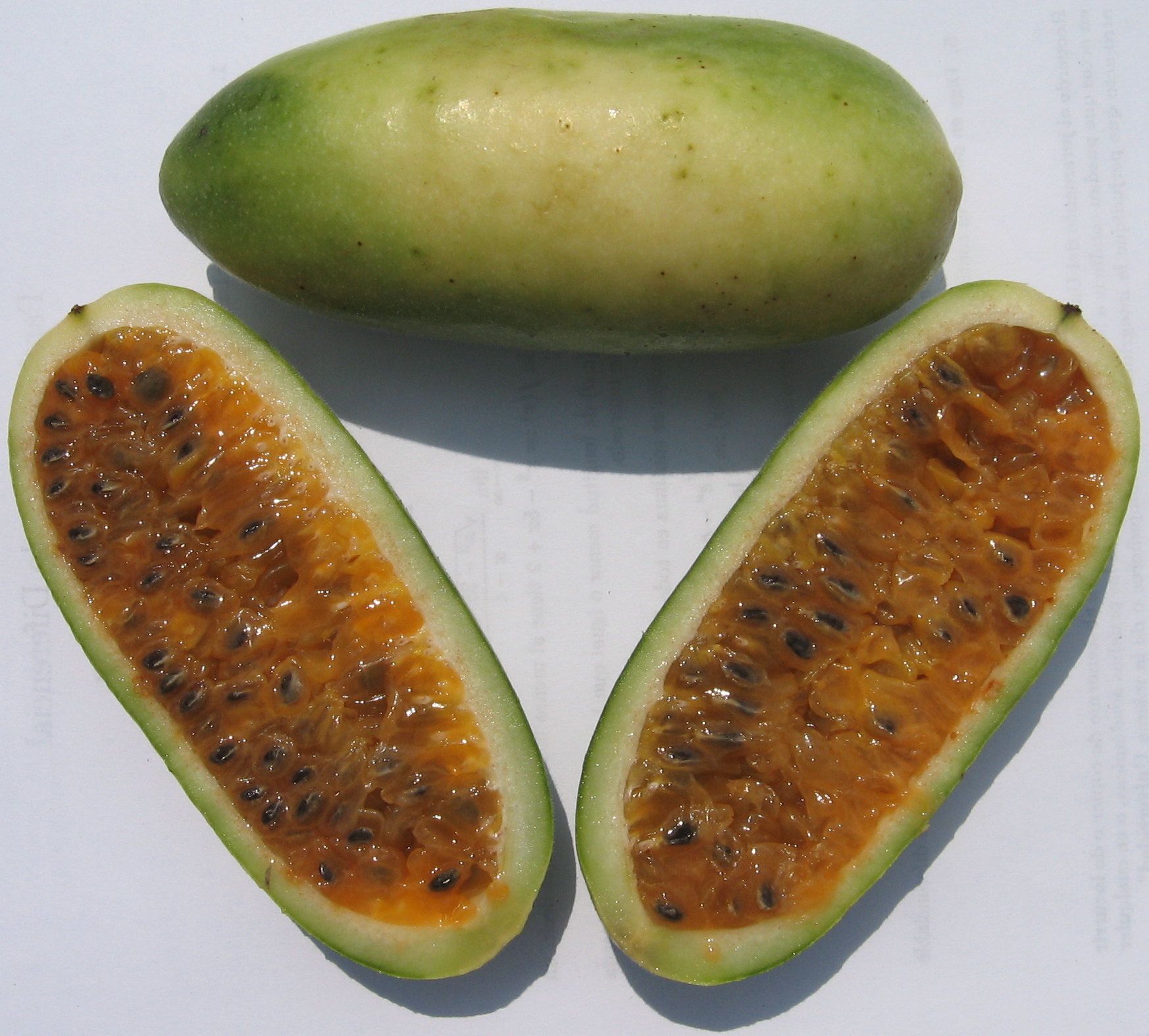

Scientific classification
- Kingdom: Plantae
- Clade: Embryophytes
- Clade: Tracheophytes
- Clade: Spermatophytes
- Clade: Angiosperms
- Clade: Eudicots
- Clade: Rosids
- Order: Malpighiales
- Family: Passifloraceae
- Genus: Passiflora
- Species: P. tripartita

Binomial name
- Passiflora tripartita (Juss.) Poir. (1811)

Synonyms
- Passiflora psilantha (Sodiro) Killip; Passiflora tripartita var. tripartita; Tacsonia psilantha Sodiro; Tacsonia tripartita Juss.

= Passiflora tripartita =

Species of vine

Passiflora tripartita, also called curuba, tumbo, curuba de Castilla, tumbo serrano and poro poro, is a species of Passiflora from Peru, Bolivia, Ecuador, Colombia, and Brazil in areas at elevations of 2000 – 3200 meters.

== Description ==
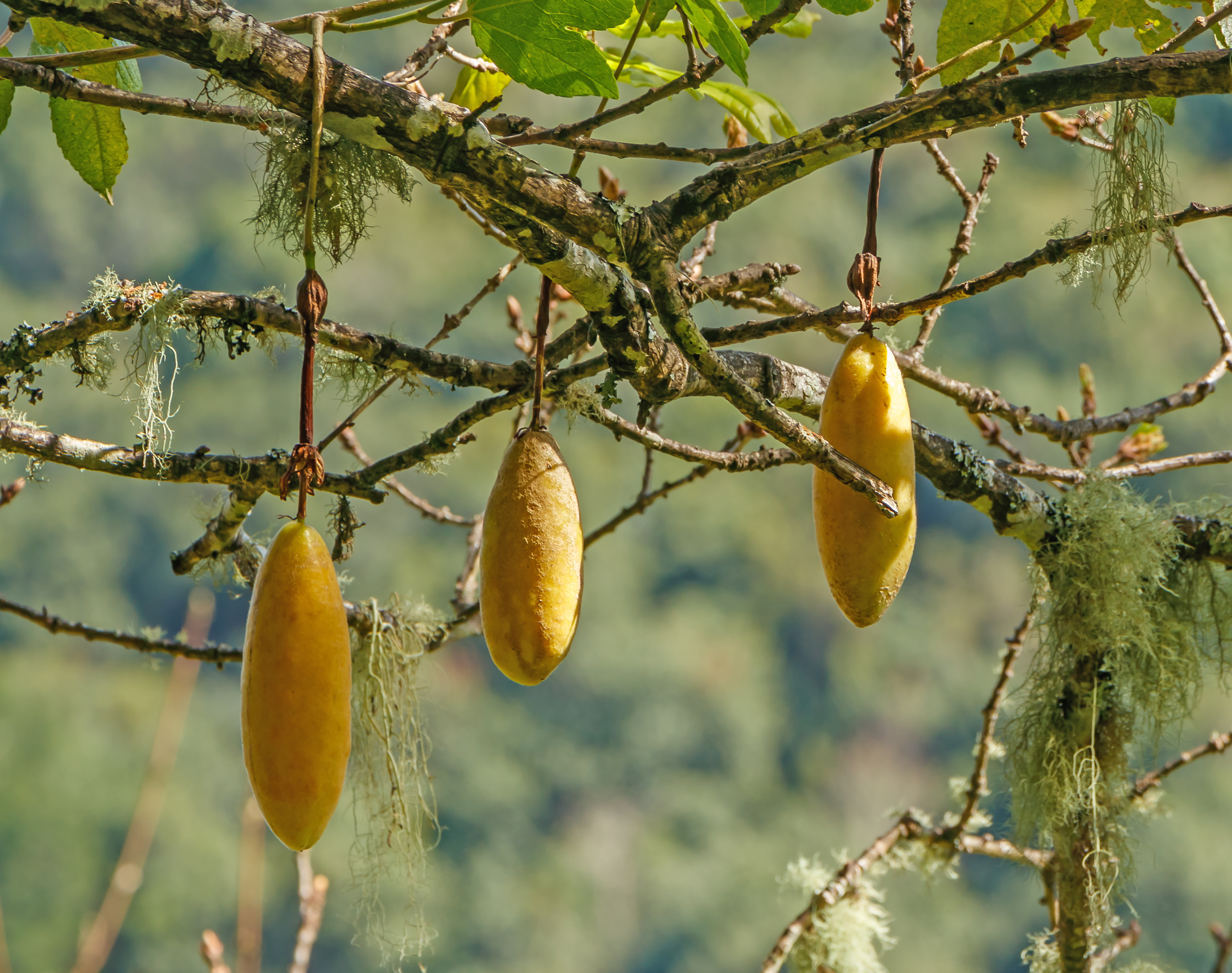
Fruits

The banana passionfruit is native to the Andean valleys from Venezuela to Bolivia. It has been domesticated and cultivated since pre-Columbian times by various cultures of western South America. Today, it is commonly cultivated, and its fruit are regularly sold in local markets. The vine is grown in California as an ornamental under the name "soft leaf passionflower". It is grown to some extent in Hawaii, Madeira and the State of Tamil Nadu, India. The fruit is yellow-orange when ripe and contains a sweet edible orange-colored pulp with black seeds.

P. tripartita var. mollissima and P. tarminiana were until recently considered to be one species, P. mollissima.

== Varieties ==
- Passiflora tripartita var. azuayensis
- Passiflora tripartita var. mollissima
- Passiflora tripartita var. tripartita
