= Arboa berneriana =

Scientific classification
- Kingdom: Plantae
- Clade: Tracheophytes
- Clade: Angiosperms
- Clade: Eudicots
- Clade: Rosids
- Order: Malpighiales
- Family: Passifloraceae
- Genus: Arboa
- Species: A. berneriana

Binomial name
- Arboa berneriana (Tul.) Thulin & Razafim.
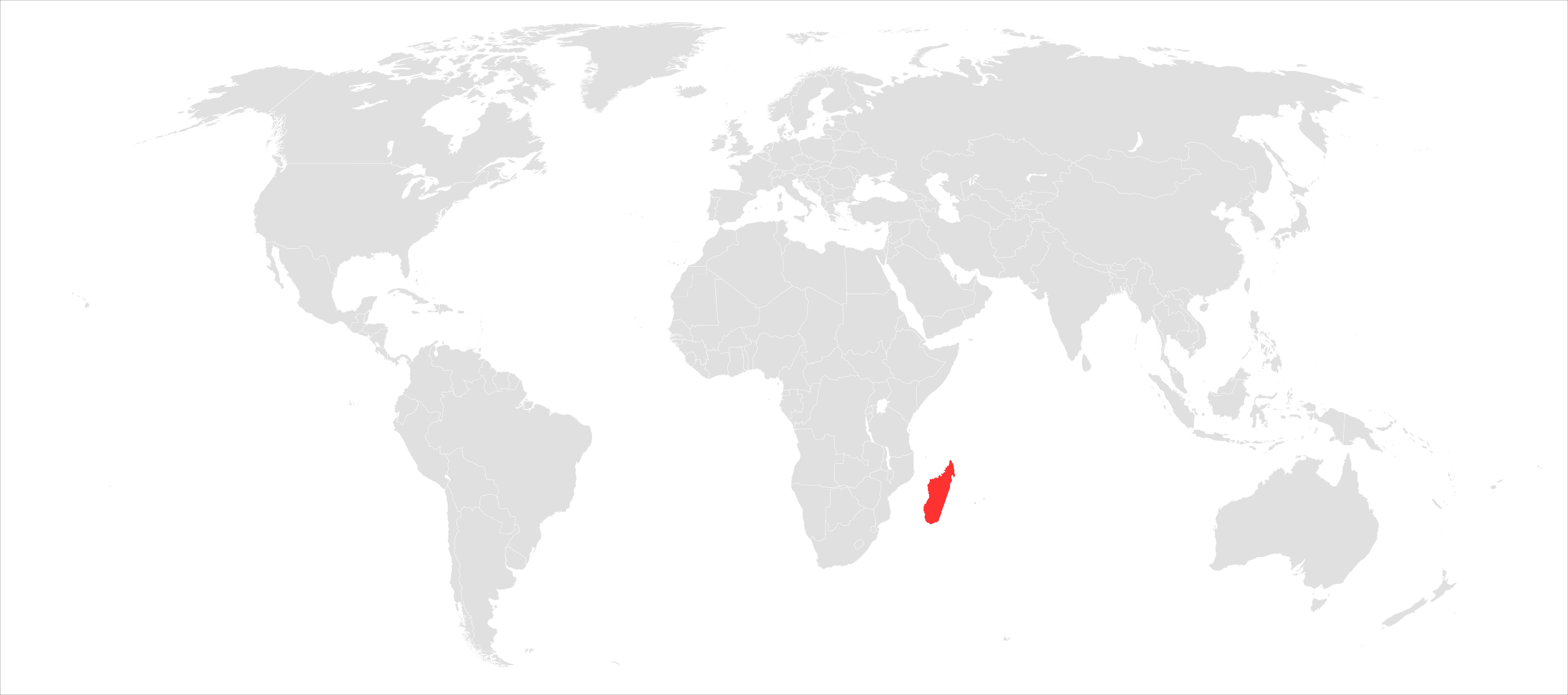

Synonyms
- Erblichia berneriana (Tul.) Arb; Piriqueta berneriana (Tul.) Urb. i; Turnera berneriana Tul.

Species of flowering plant

Arboa berneriana is a shrub or tree that grows in the wet tropics of northern Madagascar. It has varying ranges of colors from yellow to orange to red.

Previously, A. berneriana was classified as Turnera berneriana, Erblichia berneriana, and Piriqueta berneriana . Phylogenetic analysis of Turneroideae, however, suggested it should be classified as Arboa.
