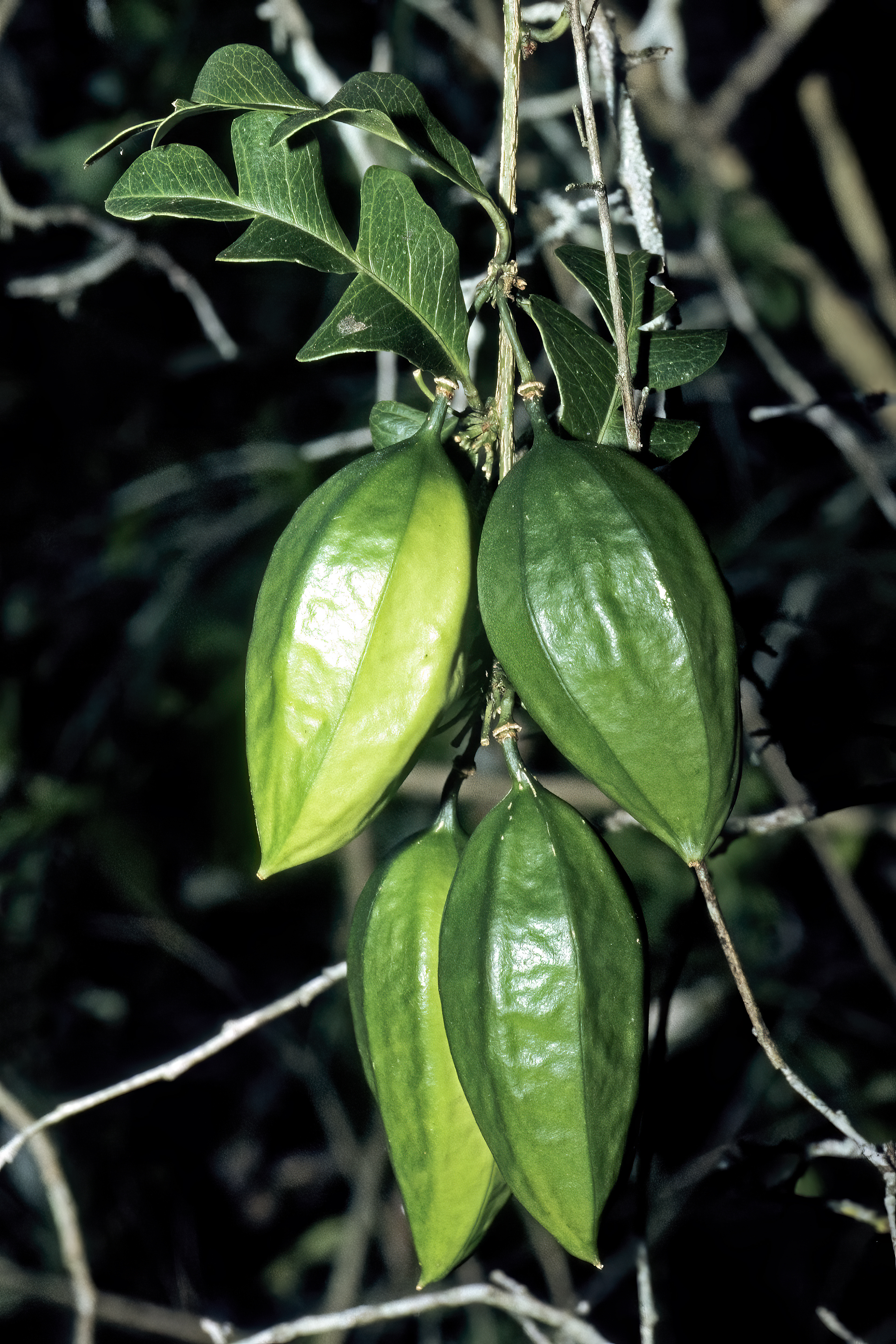
- Developing fruits of Schlechterina mitostemmatoides

Scientific classification
- Kingdom: Plantae
- Clade: Tracheophytes
- Clade: Angiosperms
- Clade: Eudicots
- Clade: Rosids
- Order: Malpighiales
- Family: Passifloraceae
- Subfamily: Passifloroideae
- Tribe: Passifloreae
- Genus: Schlechterina; Harms
- Species: S. mitostemmatoides

Binomial name
- Schlechterina mitostemmatoides Harms

= Schlechterina =

Species of flowering plant

Schlechterina is a monotypic genus of flowering plants belonging to the family Passifloraceae. The only knowns species is Schlechterina mitostemmatoides.

It is native to Kenya, Mozambique, Tanzania and KwaZulu-Natal (in South Africa).

The genus name of Schlechterina is in honour of Rudolf Schlechter (1872–1925), a German taxonomist, botanist, and author of several works on orchids. The Latin specific epithet of mitostemmatoides is a compound word, 'mito-' from Greek μίτος (mítos) meaning thread and stem. It was first described and published in Bot. Jahrb. Syst. Vol.33 on page 148 in 1902.

== Other sources ==
- Fernandes, R. & Fernandes, A., 1978. Passifloraceae. In: Launert, E. (Editor). Flora Zambesiaca. Volume 4. Flora Zambesiaca Managing Committee, London, United Kingdom. pp. 368–411.
- Jäger, A.K., McAlister, B.G. & van Staden, J., 1995. Cyanogenic glycosides in leaves and callus cultures of Schlechterina mitostemmatoides. South African Journal of Botany 61(5): 274–275.
- Maite, A.L., 1994. An ethnobotanical study of two Passifloraceae species used in traditional medicine in Mozambique. In: Seyani, J.H. & Chikuni, A.C. (Editors). Proceedings of the 8th plenary meeting of AETFAT, 2–11 April 1991, Zomba, Malawi. Volume 1. pp. 267–271.
