= Streptopetalum =

Scientific classification
- Kingdom: Plantae
- Clade: Tracheophytes
- Clade: Angiosperms
- Clade: Eudicots
- Clade: Rosids
- Order: Malpighiales
- Family: Passifloraceae
- Subfamily: Turneroideae
- Genus: Streptopetalum; Hochst.
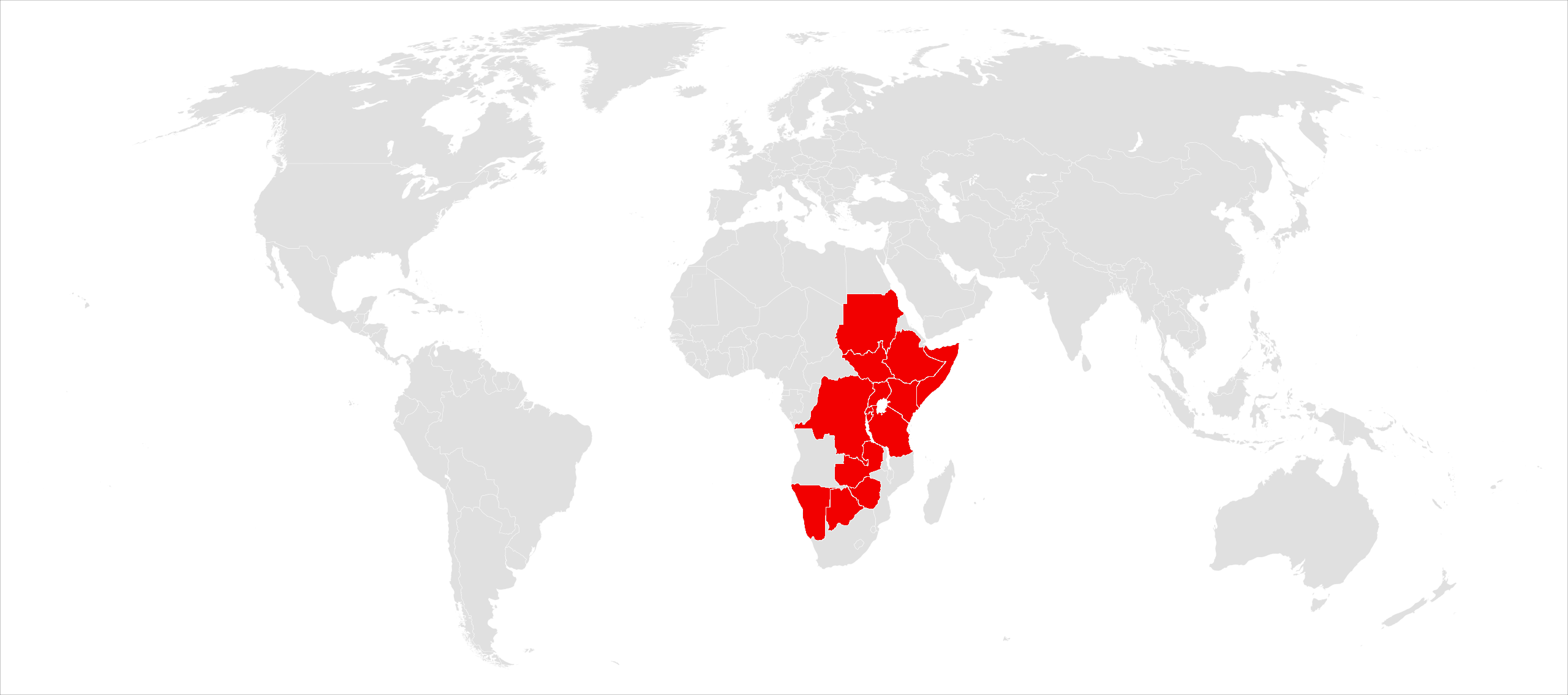

Genus of plants

Streptopetalum is a genus of flowering plants belonging to the family Passifloraceae.

Its native range is Eritrea to Southern Africa.

== Species ==
Species:

- Streptopetalum arenarium Thulin
- Streptopetalum graminifolium Urb.
- Streptopetalum hildebrandtii Urb.
- Streptopetalum luteoglandulosum R.Fern.
- Streptopetalum serratum Hochst.
- Streptopetalum wittei Staner
