= Arboa integrifolia =

Conservation status
- Least Concern (IUCN 3.1)

Scientific classification
- Kingdom: Plantae
- Clade: Tracheophytes
- Clade: Angiosperms
- Clade: Eudicots
- Clade: Rosids
- Order: Malpighiales
- Family: Passifloraceae
- Genus: Arboa
- Species: A. integrifolia

Binomial name
- Arboa integrifolia (Claverie) Thulin & Razafim.
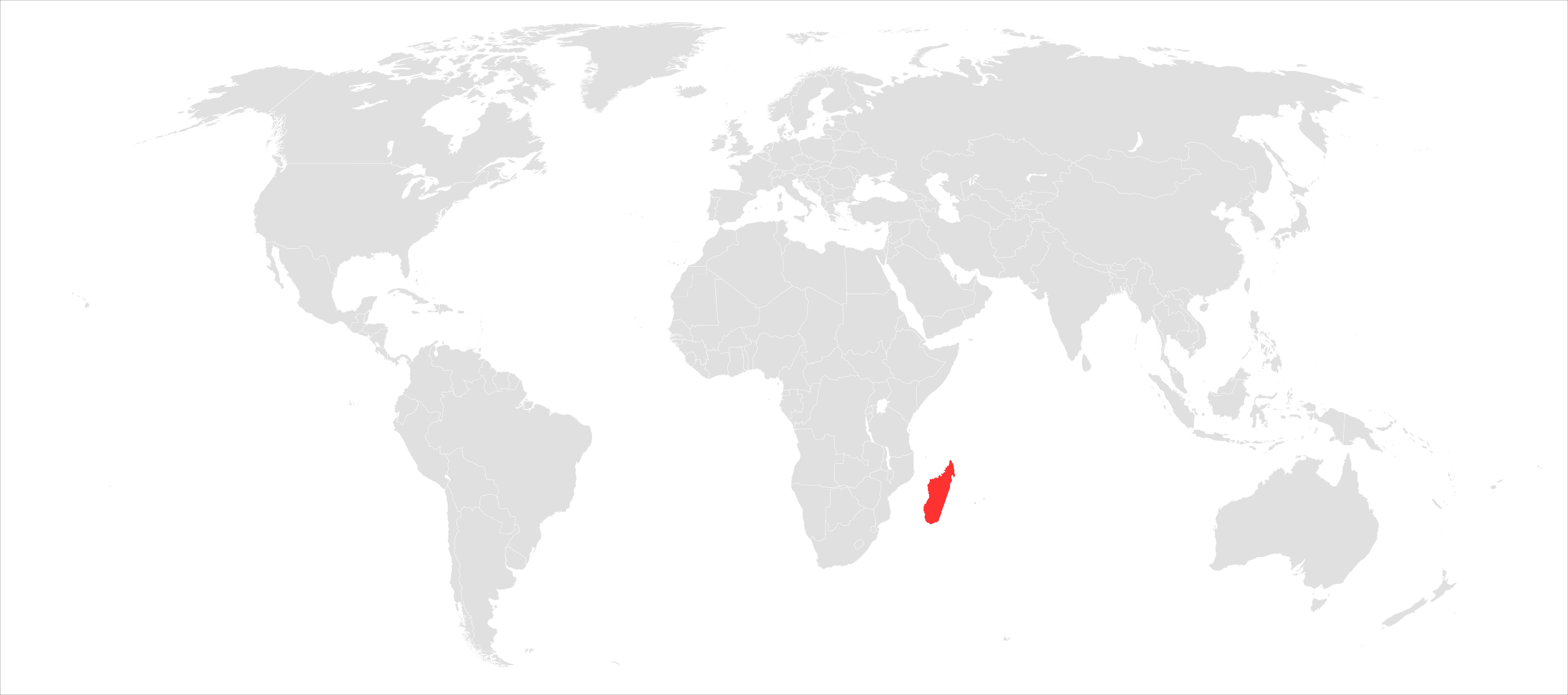

Synonyms
- Erblichia integrifolia (Claverie) Arbo; Paropsia integrifolia Claverie; Piriqueta integrifolia (Claverie) Capuron; Piriqueta mandrarensis Humbert

Species of flowering plant

Arboa integrifolia is a shrub or tree with yellow flowers that grows in the dry tropics of Madagascar. A. integrifolia was previously classified as Erblichia integrifolia, Paropsia integrifolia, Piriqueta integrifolia, and Piriqueta mandrarensis, however, phylogenetic analysis supports its classification as Arboa.
