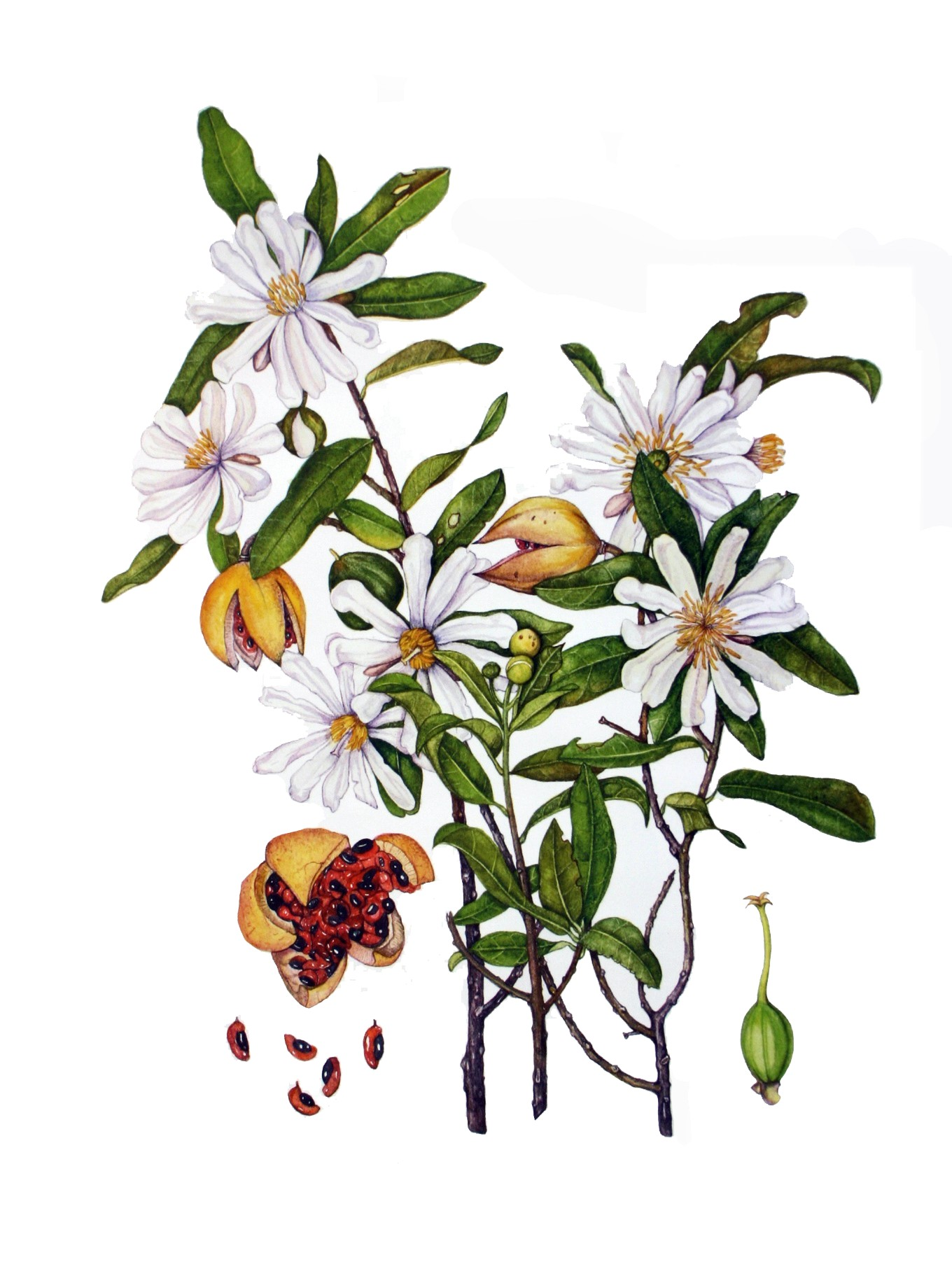
- Xylotheca kraussiana - painting by Barbara Pike, South African botanical painter

Scientific classification
- Kingdom: Plantae
- Clade: Tracheophytes
- Clade: Angiosperms
- Clade: Eudicots
- Clade: Rosids
- Order: Malpighiales
- Family: Achariaceae
- Genus: Xylotheca; Hochst.

Synonyms
- Chlanis Klotzsch; Heptaca Lour.

= Xylotheca =

Genus of flowering plants

Xylotheca is a genus of flowering plants in the family Achariaceae. The genus includes four species native to central and southern Africa and Madagascar.

== Species ==
Four species are accepted.

- Xylotheca capreifolia (Baker) Gilg
- Xylotheca kraussiana Hochst.
- Xylotheca longipes (Gilg) Gilg
- Xylotheca tettensis (Klotzsch) Gilg
