= Arboa madagascariensis =

Scientific classification
- Kingdom: Plantae
- Clade: Tracheophytes
- Clade: Angiosperms
- Clade: Eudicots
- Clade: Rosids
- Order: Malpighiales
- Family: Passifloraceae
- Genus: Arboa
- Species: A. madagascariensis

Binomial name
- Arboa madagascariensis (O.Hoffm.) Thulin & Razafim.
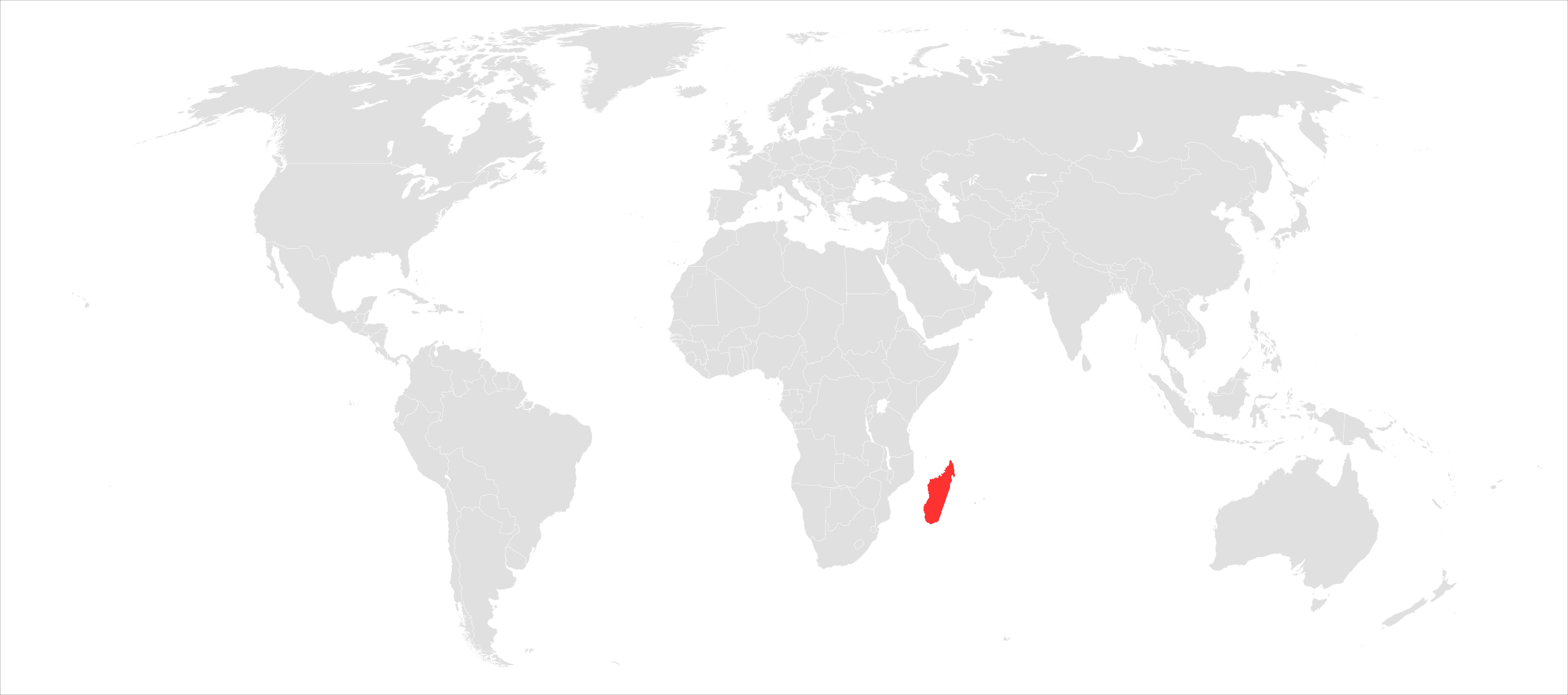

Synonyms
- Erblichia madagascariensis O.Hoffm.; Turnera madagascariensis (O.Hoffm.) Baill.; Piriqueta madagascariensis Urb.

Species of flowering plant

Arboa madagascariensis is a woody plant with yellow flowers native to Madagascar.

It was previously classified as Erblichia madagascariensis, Turnera madagascariensis, Turnera hildebrandtii, and Piriqueta madagascariensis, however, recent phylogenetic analysis supports its classification as Arboa.
