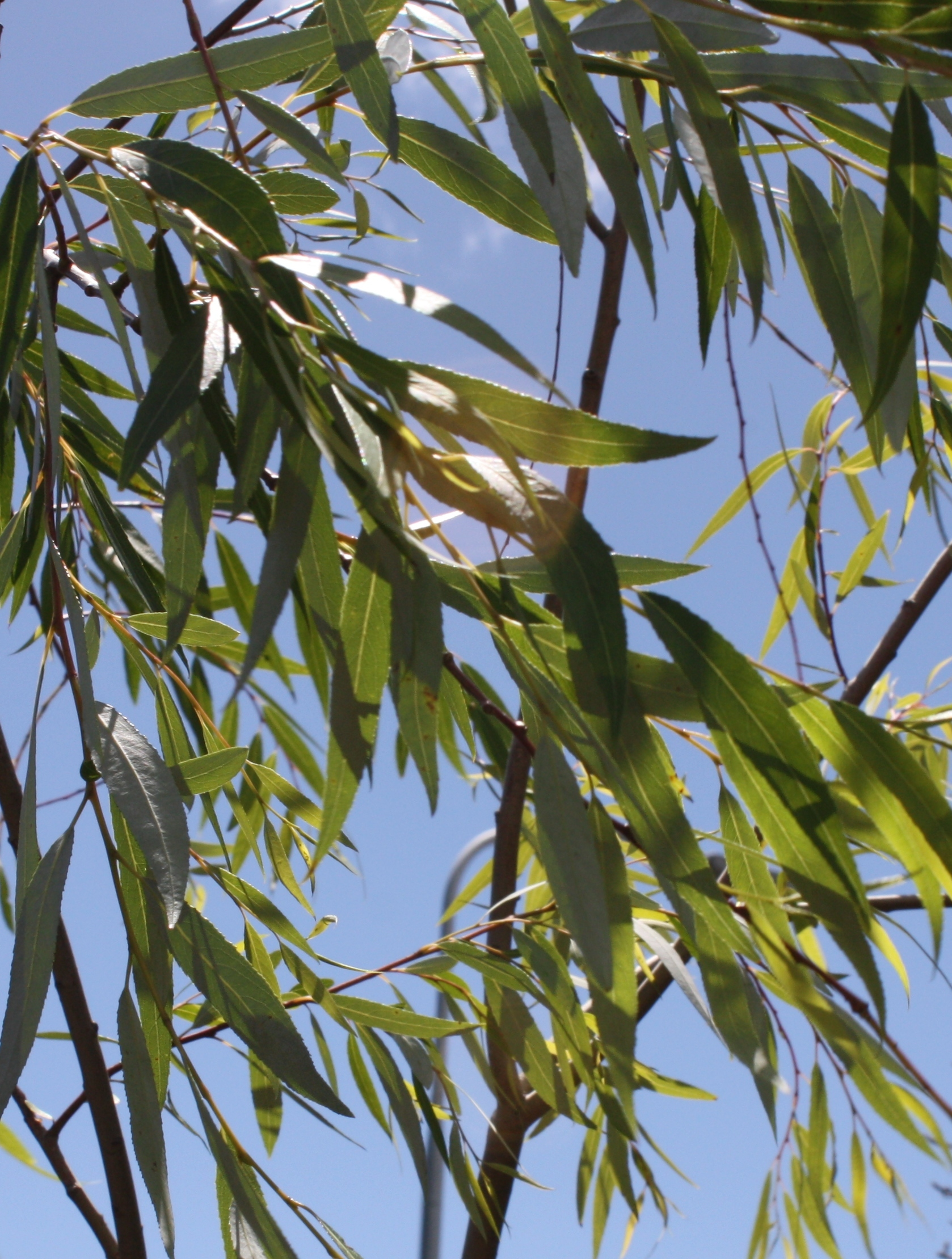

Conservation status
- Least Concern (IUCN 3.1)

Scientific classification
- Kingdom: Plantae
- Clade: Tracheophytes
- Clade: Angiosperms
- Clade: Eudicots
- Clade: Rosids
- Order: Malpighiales
- Family: Salicaceae
- Genus: Salix
- Species: S. mucronata

Binomial name
- Salix mucronata Andersson

Synonyms
- Salix hirsuta Salix capensis Salix safsaf

= Salix mucronata =

Species of willow

Salix mucronata (commonly called the Cape silver willow or Safsaf willow) is a tall, graceful, Semi-Deciduous willow tree. It grows along riverbanks in South Africa, and is used for a wide range of traditional medicines.
The Cape willow is dioecious (separate male and female trees).

== Taxonomy ==
This variable-looking species was previously subdivided into a number of different species. These have now all been downgraded to just being subspecies of Salix mucronata. These subspecies include:

- S. m. hirsuta (silver willow)
- S. m. mucronata (Safsaf willow)
- S. m. woodii (flute willow)
- S. m. capensis (small-leaved willow)
