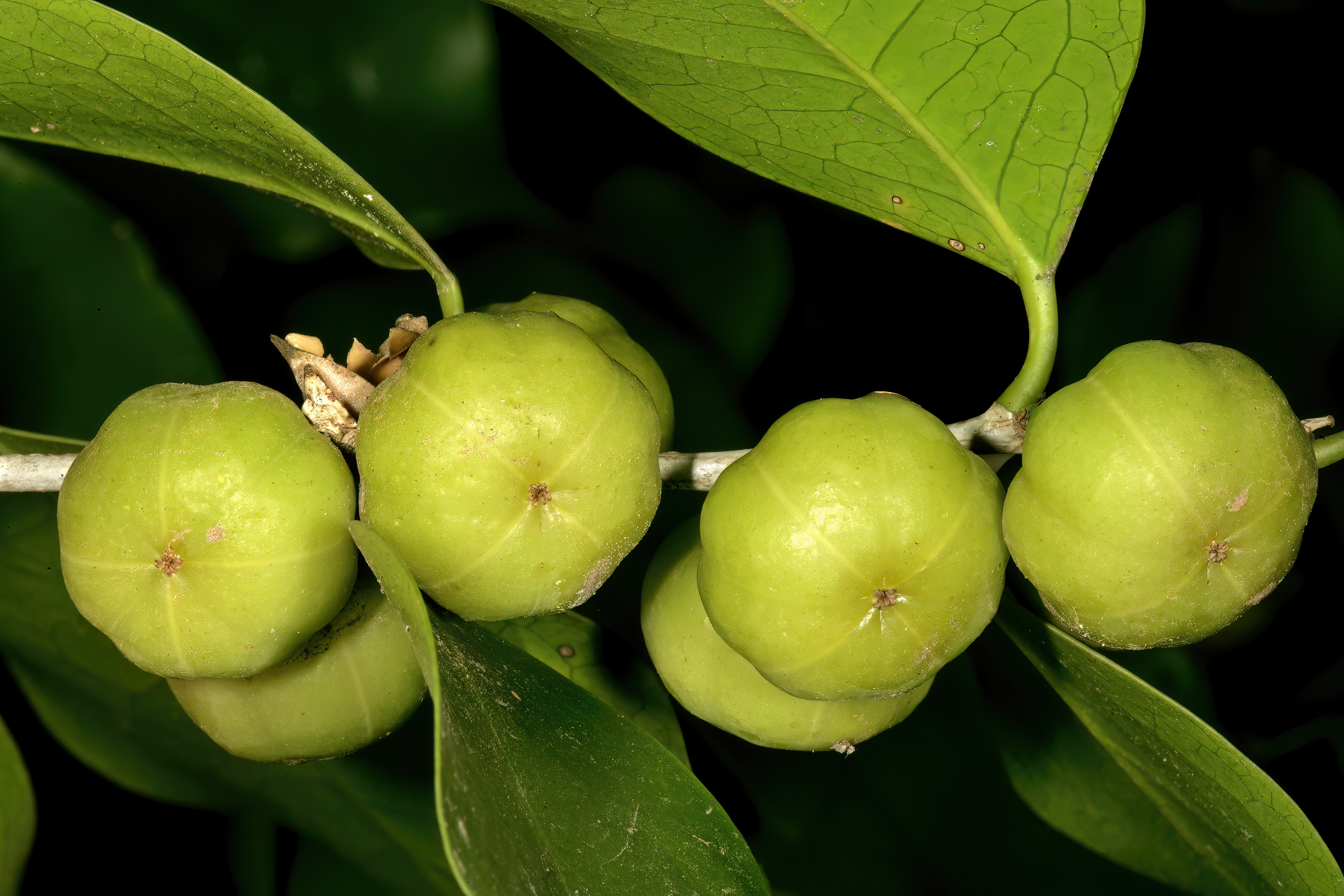

Scientific classification
- Kingdom: Plantae
- Clade: Tracheophytes
- Clade: Angiosperms
- Clade: Eudicots
- Clade: Rosids
- Order: Malpighiales
- Family: Phyllanthaceae
- Subfamily: Phyllanthoideae
- Tribe: Wielandieae
- Subtribe: Astrocasiinae
- Genus: Heywoodia; Sim
- Species: H. lucens

Binomial name
- Heywoodia lucens Sim

= Heywoodia =

Genus of flowering plants

Heywoodia is a genus of plants in the Phyllanthaceae first described as a genus in 1907. It contains only one known species, Heywoodia lucens, native to eastern, southeastern, and southern Africa (Kenya, Uganda, Tanzania, Mozambique, KwaZulu-Natal, Eswatini, Cape Province).
