= Afroqueta =

Haarbossie

Scientific classification
- Kingdom: Plantae
- Clade: Tracheophytes
- Clade: Angiosperms
- Clade: Eudicots
- Clade: Rosids
- Order: Malpighiales
- Family: Passifloraceae
- Subfamily: Turneroideae
- Genus: Afroqueta; Thulin & Razafim.
- Species: A. capensis

Binomial name
- Afroqueta capensis (Harv.) Thulin & Razafim
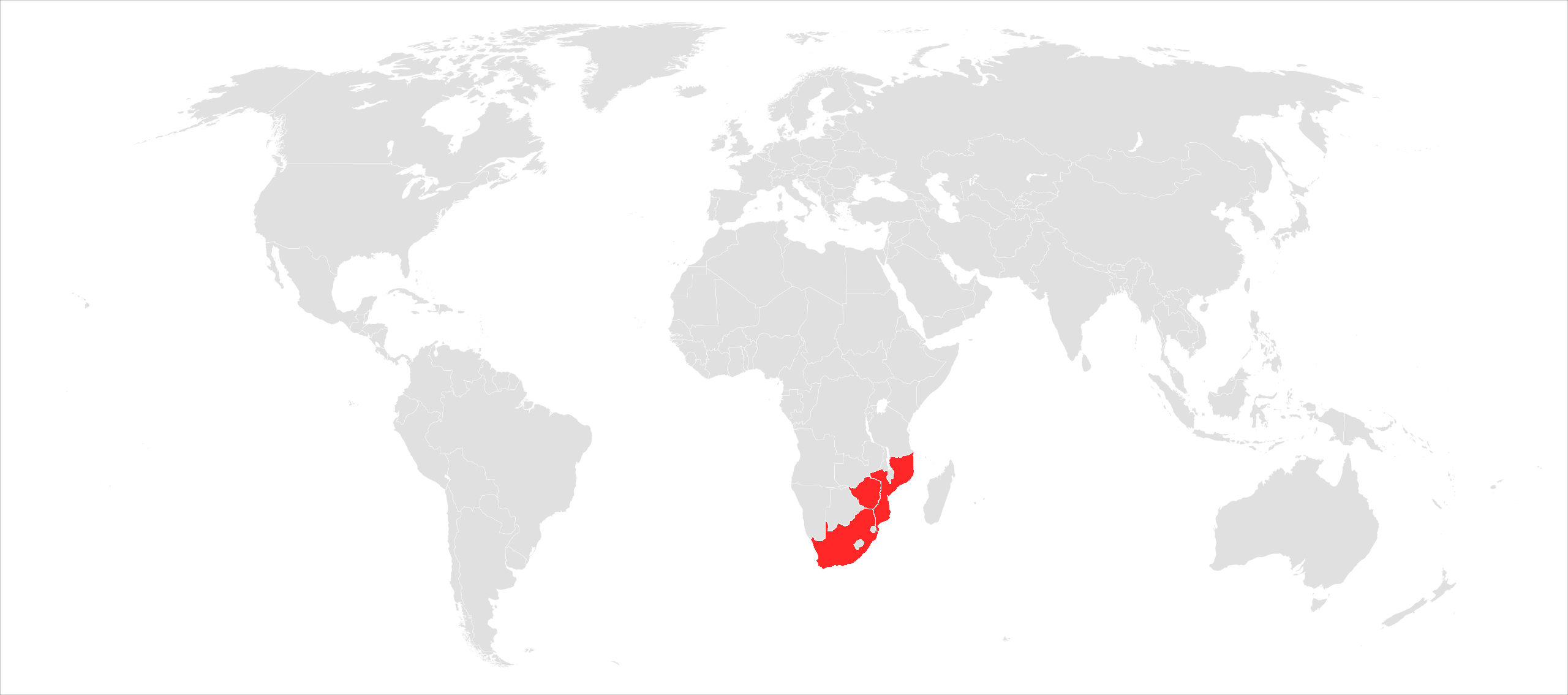

Synonyms
- Piriqueta capensis (Harv.) Urb; Turnera capensis Harv.

Genus of flowering plants

Afroqueta capensis is the only member of Afroqueta, a monotypic genus of flowering plant. It is colloquially called Haarbossie.

== Description ==
=== Morphology ===
Afroqueta capensis is a perennial subshrub. It has thick and woody roots, 4 - 6 inch long stems, and 1-1.5 inch long leaves. Older stems appear purple in color. It can be distinguished from other members of the Turneroideae by its 10 veined nearly free calyx tubes and its corona which is reduced to tufts of hairs around the base of the perianth.

Its flowers are described as heterostylous or homostylous and yellow.

== Taxonomy ==
In 1862, W.H.Harvey would make the initial description of A. capensis, classifying it as Turnera capensis. In 1883, I. Urban would reclassify A. capensis on the basis of its "leaf shape, hairiness," and locality.

Phylogenetic analysis of Turneroideae suggested A. capensis was closer related to other African members than to Turnera or Piriqueta.

== Distribution ==
A. capensis is native to the tropical southern regions of Zimbabwe to KwaZulu-Natal.

Herbarium samples originate from Aapjes River.

== Conservation status ==
As of 2015, A. capensis conservation status is "least concern" as it is considered widespread and a very common plant.
