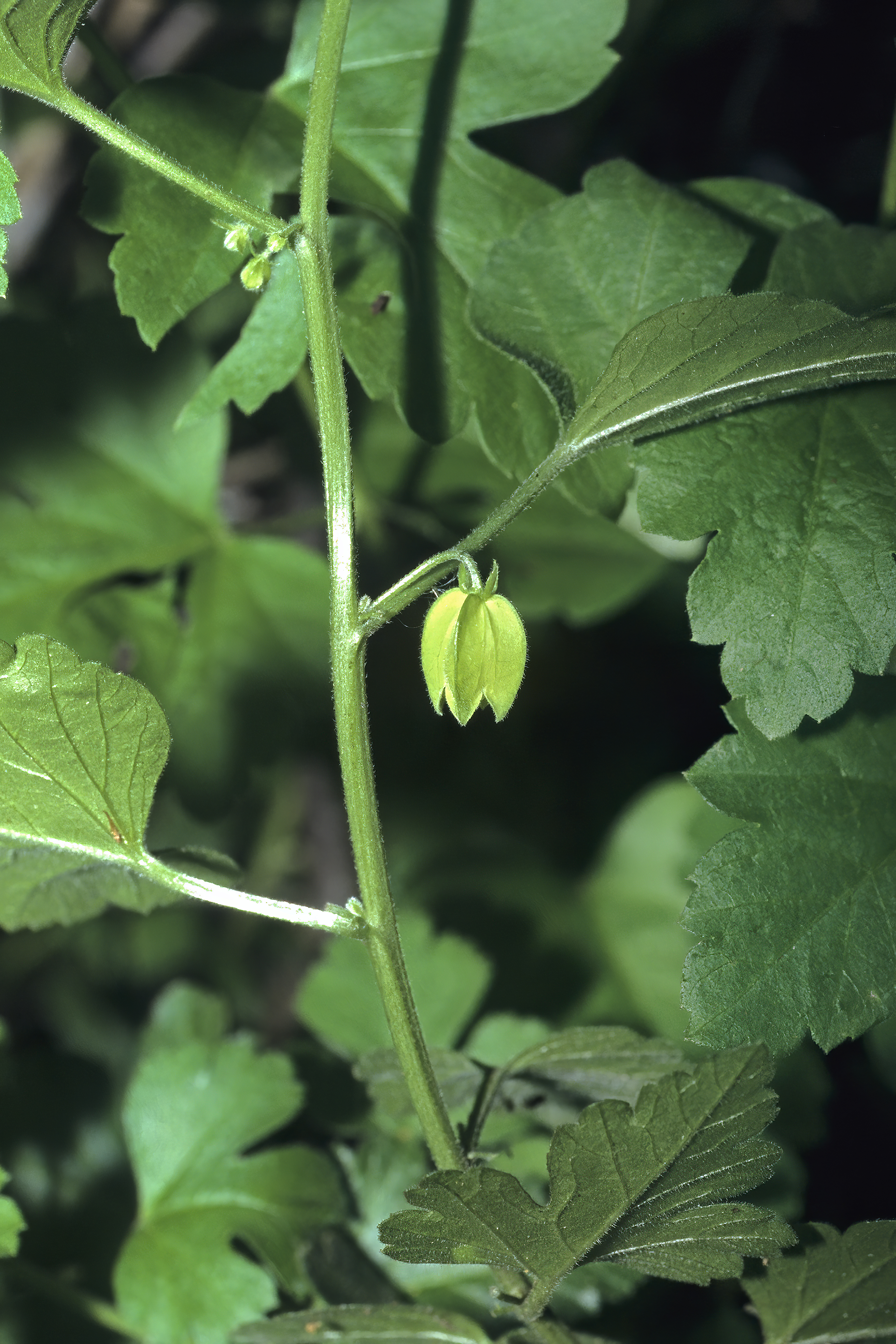
- In Kap River Nature Reserve, South Africa

Conservation status
- Least Concern (SANBI Red List)

Scientific classification
- Kingdom: Plantae
- Clade: Tracheophytes
- Clade: Angiosperms
- Clade: Eudicots
- Clade: Rosids
- Order: Malpighiales
- Family: Achariaceae
- Genus: Acharia; Thunb.
- Species: A. tragodes

Binomial name
- Acharia tragodes Thunb.

= Acharia tragodes =

Species of flowering plant

Acharia is a monotypic genus of flowering plants in the family Achariaceae. The sole species is Acharia tragodes, which is endemic to the Cape Provinces in South Africa.

The genus is named for Swedish botanist Erik Acharius (1757–1819). It was first published in Prodr. Pl. Cap. on page 14 in 1794.
