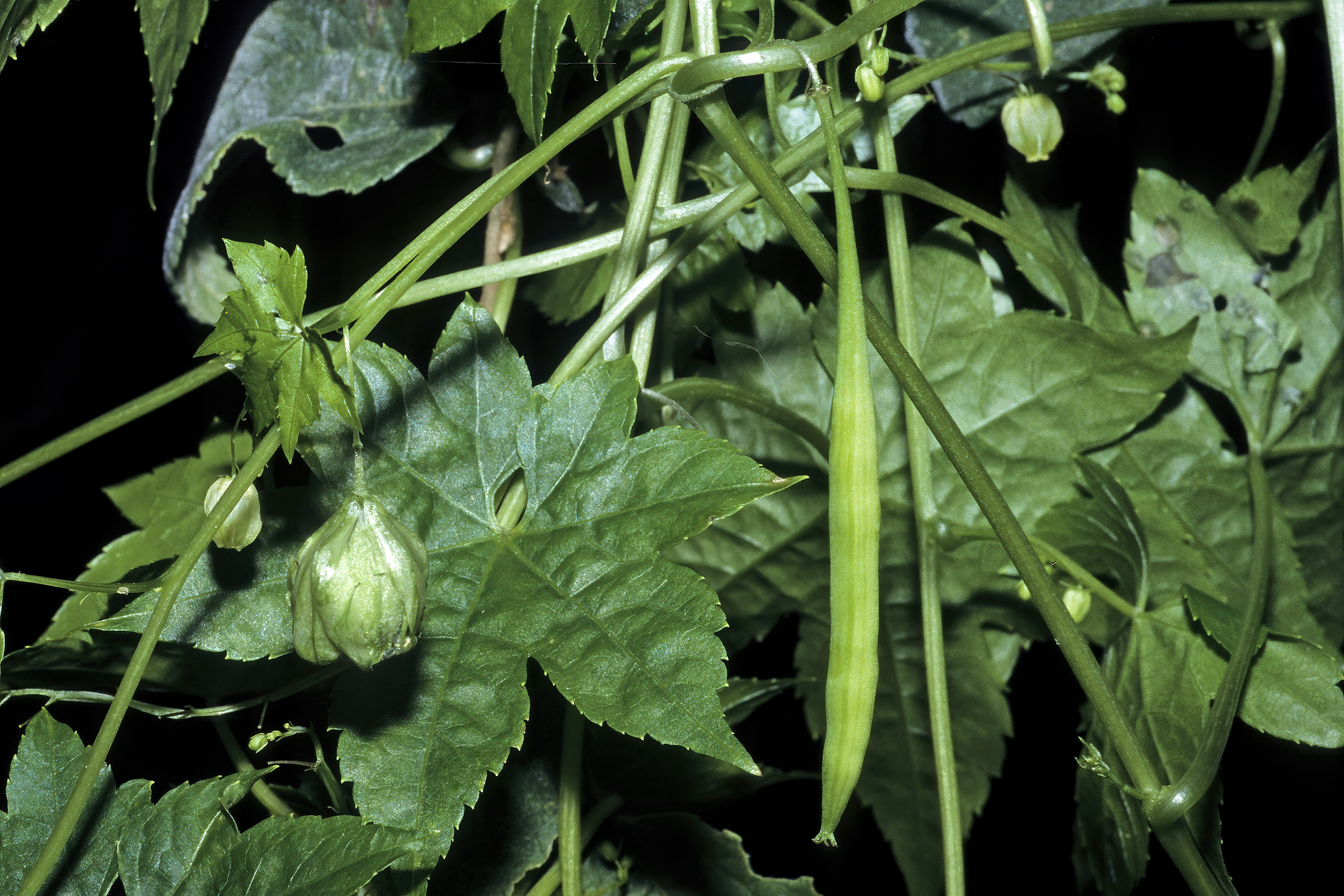
- Ceratiosicyos laevis in Port Elizabeth, South Africa

Scientific classification
- Kingdom: Plantae
- Clade: Tracheophytes
- Clade: Angiosperms
- Clade: Eudicots
- Clade: Rosids
- Order: Malpighiales
- Family: Achariaceae
- Genus: Ceratiosicyos; Nees
- Species: C. laevis

Binomial name
- Ceratiosicyos laevis (Thunb.) A.Meeuse

= Ceratiosicyos =

Genus of flowering plants

Ceratiosicyos is a genus of flowering plants in the family Achariaceae. There is only one accepted species, Ceratiosicyos laevis, native to southern Africa.
