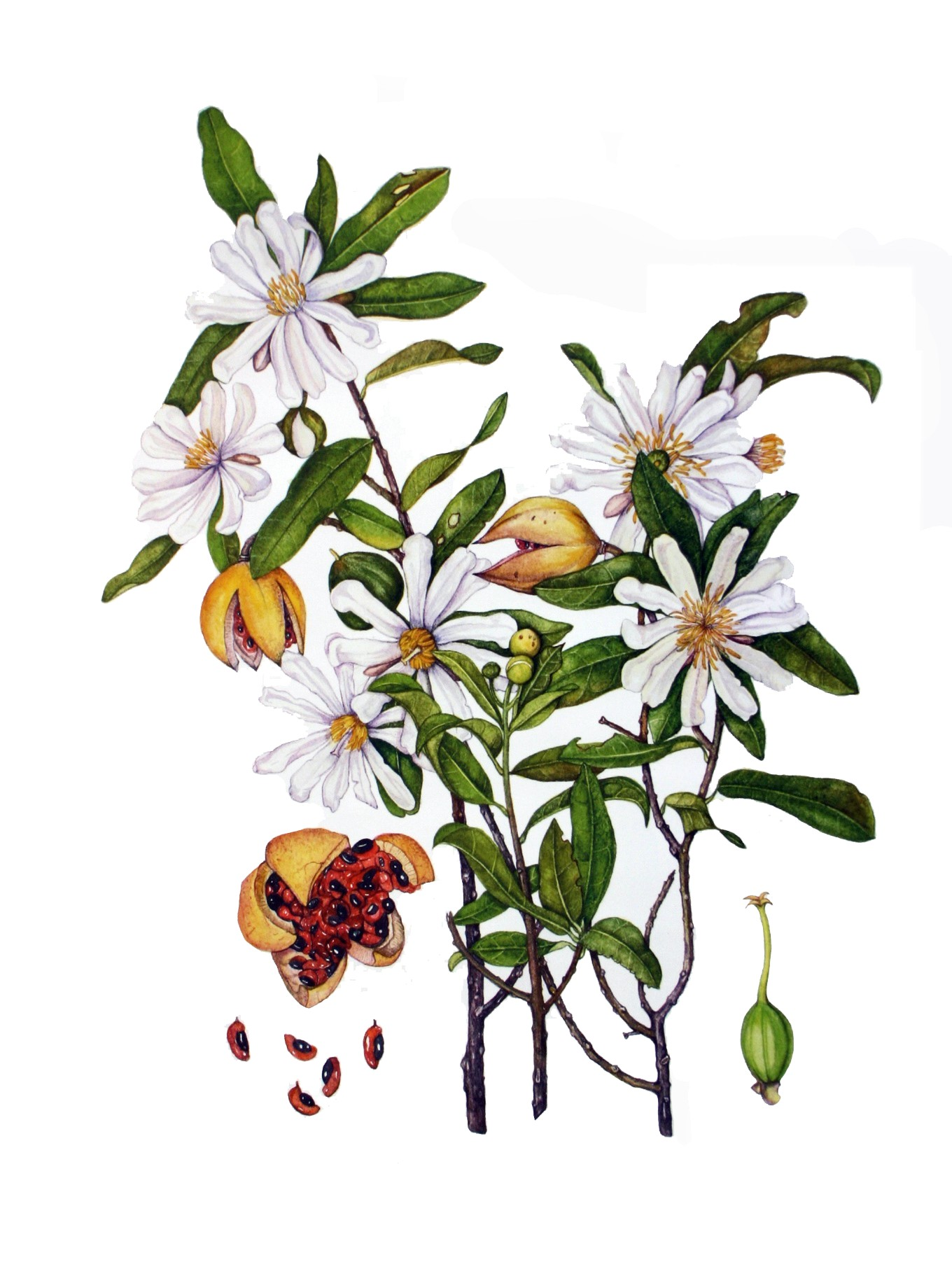

Conservation status
- Least Concern (IUCN 3.1)

Scientific classification
- Kingdom: Plantae
- Clade: Tracheophytes
- Clade: Angiosperms
- Clade: Eudicots
- Clade: Rosids
- Order: Malpighiales
- Family: Achariaceae
- Genus: Xylotheca
- Species: X. kraussiana

Binomial name
- Xylotheca kraussiana Hochst.

Synonyms
- Oncoba kraussiana (Hochst.) Planch.; Xylotheca kotzei E.Phillips; Xylotheca kraussiana var. glabrifolia Wild; Xylotheca lasiopetala Gilg

= Xylotheca kraussiana =

Species of tree

Xylotheca kraussiana is an African shrub or small multi-stemmed tree in the family Achariaceae. It grows in the sandveld and is widely distributed throughout the eastern parts of Southern Africa, in particular the eastern Transvaal, coastal Natal and Mozambique, preferring the sandy soils of coastal bush and forest.

'Xylotheca' meaning 'woody case' and the species name honouring Dr C.F.F. Krauss (1812-1890), a German naturalist, who later became director of Stuttgart's Natural History Museum. Krauss came to the Cape in 1838, collected in Natal from 1839 to 1840. About 8 other species of Xylotheca are to be found in central Africa and Madagascar.

Leaves are dull grey-green, alternate and covered in soft grey hairs. Flowers are white with a dense central cluster of yellow anthers and resembling a small white rose. The fruit is an ovoid woody capsule about 40 mm (1.6 in) long and distinctly ridged. Yellow when ripe, it partly splits into 5 sections revealing black seeds with a bright red aril. The pulp around the seeds is relished by birds.

This plant used to belong to the family Flacourtiaceae, but was relocated to Achariaceae by the Angiosperm Phylogeny Group.

== See also ==
- List of Southern African indigenous trees
