= Turneraceae =

Family of flowering plants

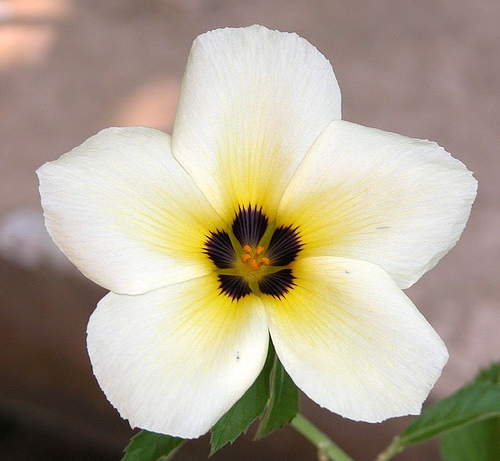
flower of Turnera subulata

Turneraceae Kunth ex DC. (/ˌtɜːrnɪˈreɪsii/) was a family of flowering plants consisting of 120 species in 10 genera. The Cronquist system placed the Turneracids in the order Violales, but it is not currently recognized as a family by the Angiosperm Phylogeny Group in the APG III system of 2009, which includes the taxa in the Turneraceae in Passifloraceae as a subfamily (Turneroideae).

== Description ==
Most species in Turneraceae are tropical or sub-tropical shrubs, with a few trees. Half of the family's species belong to the genus Turnera, including the herb damiana (T. diffusa, T. aphrodisiaca), the yellow alder (T. pumilea), which is not really an alder, and the "ramgoat dashalong" (T. ulmifolia). Another type of plant in Turneraceae with a vernacular name is stripeseed, which is actually three different species of the genus Piriqueta - the pitted stripeseed (P. cistoides), the rigid stripeseed (P. racemosa), and the purple stripeseed (P. viscosa).

== Genera ==
The genera typically included in this family are:

- Adenoa
- Erblichia
- Hyalocalyx
- Loewia
- Mathurina
- Piriqueta
- Stapfiella
- Streptopetalum
- Tricliceras (Wormskioldia)
- Turnera
