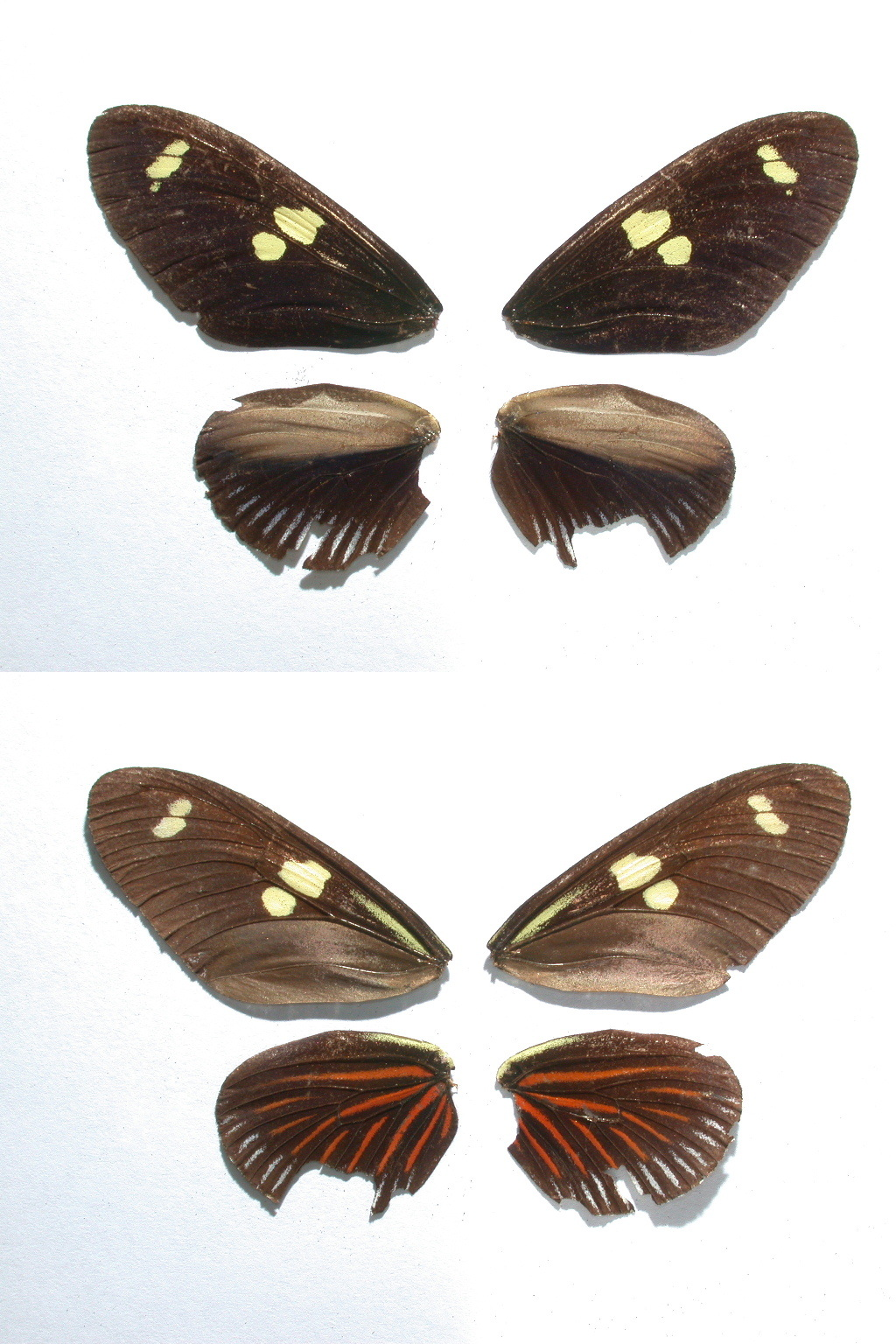

Scientific classification
- Kingdom: Animalia
- Phylum: Arthropoda
- Class: Insecta
- Order: Lepidoptera
- Family: Nymphalidae
- Genus: Heliconius
- Species: H. metharme

Binomial name
- Heliconius metharme (Erichson, 1849)

Synonyms
- Heliconia metharme Erichson, [1849]; Neruda metharme (Erichson, [1849]); Heliconia thetis Boisduval, 1870; Heliconius anaclia Riffarth, 1901

= Heliconius metharme =

Species of butterfly

Heliconius metharme is a species of butterfly of the family Nymphalidae. It was described by Wilhelm Ferdinand Erichson in 1849. It is widespread in the Amazon basin, Venezuela and the Guianas. The habitat consists of deep forests.

It is part of a mimicry ring with Heliconius sara, Heliconius wallacei and Heliconius doris.

The larvae are gregarious and feed on Dilkea and Mitostemma species.

== Subspecies ==
- Heliconius metharme metharme — Guyana
- Heliconius metharme makiritare (Brown & Fernández, 1985) — Venezuela
- Heliconius metharme perseis Stichel, 1923 — Colombia
