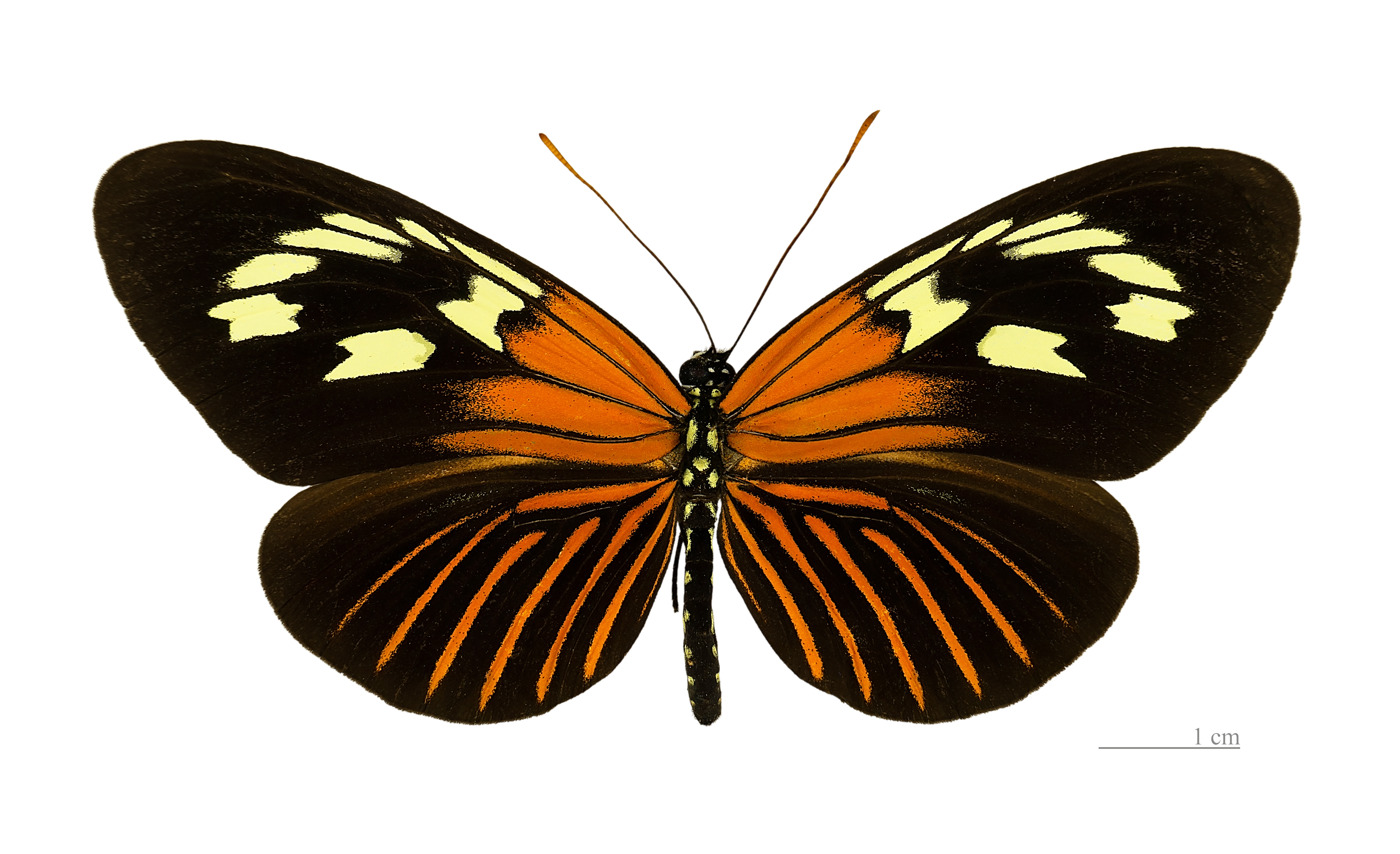
- Dorsal view
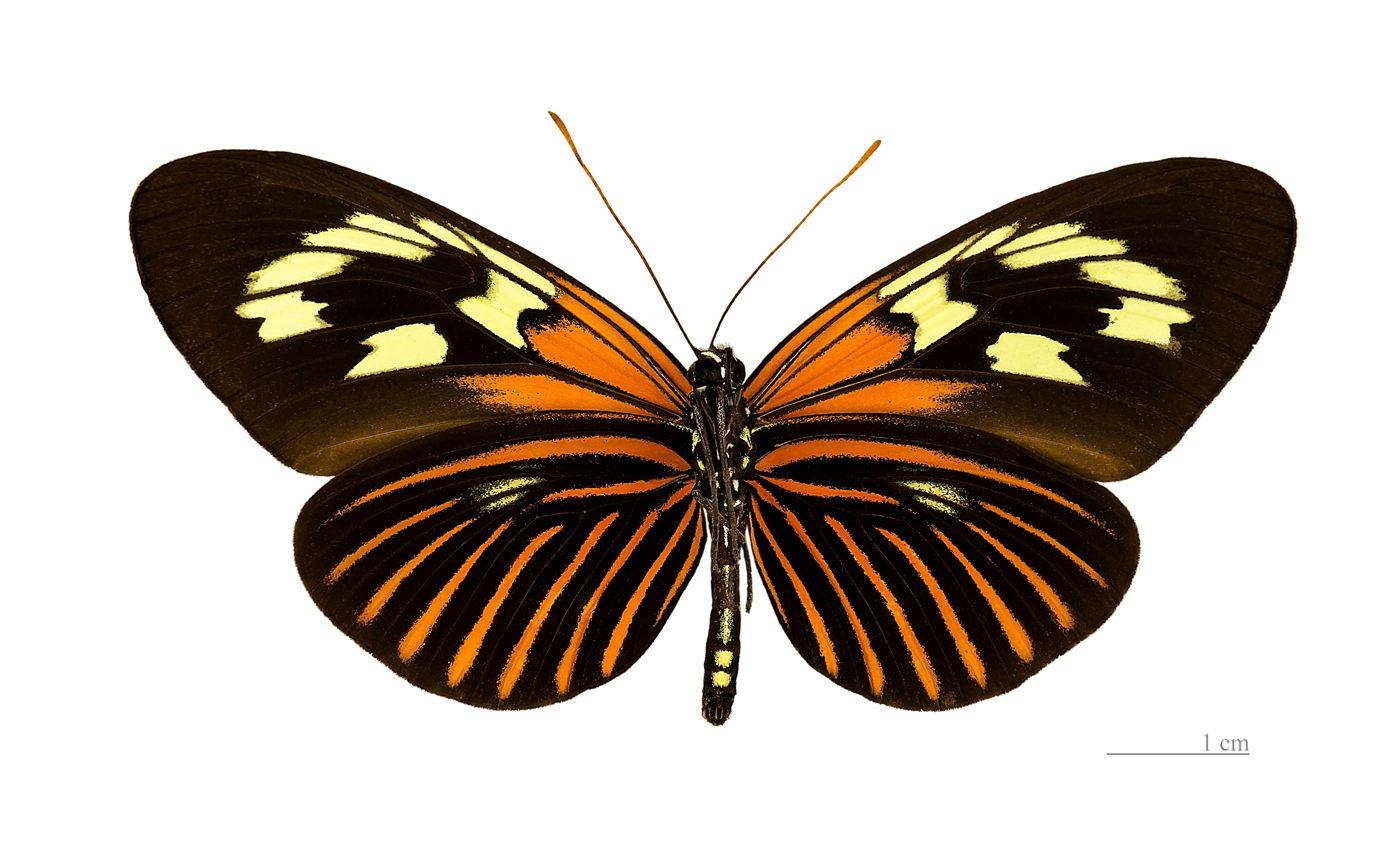
- Ventral view

Scientific classification
- Domain: Eukaryota
- Kingdom: Animalia
- Phylum: Arthropoda
- Class: Insecta
- Order: Lepidoptera
- Family: Nymphalidae
- Genus: Heliconius
- Species: H. aoede

Binomial name
- Heliconius aoede (Hübner, 1813)

Synonyms
- Nereis aoede Hübner, [1813]; Neruda aoede (Hübner, [1813])

= Heliconius aoede =

Aoede longwing

Species of butterfly

Heliconius aoede, the Aoede longwing, is a species of butterfly of the family Nymphalidae. It was described by Jacob Hübner in 1813. It is found in the Amazon basin. The habitat consists of deep forests.

The larvae feed on Dilkea and Mitostemma species.

== Subspecies ==
Listed alphabetically:

- H. a. aoede (Brazil)
- H. a. aliciae (Neukirchen, 2000) (Ecuador)
- H. a. astydamia (Erichson, [1849]) (Guyana)
- H. a. auca (Neukirchen, 1997) (Ecuador)
- H. a. ayacuchensis Neukirchen, 1992 (Venezuela)
- H. a. bartletti (Druce, 1876) (Peru, Colombia)
- H. a. centurius Neukirchen, 1994 (French Guiana)
- H. a. cupidineus Stichel, 1906 (Peru)
- H. a. emmelina (Oberthür, 1902) (Guyana)
- H. a. eurycleia Brown, 1973 (Brazil: Mato Grosso)
- H. a. faleria Fruhstorfer, 1910 (Brazil: Mato Grosso)
- H. a. lucretius (Weymer, 1891) (Brazil: Amazonas)
- H. a. manu Lamas, 1976 (Peru)
- H. a. philipi Brown, 1976 (Bolivia)
