= Deidamia =

Deidamia may refer to:

- Deidamia (mythology), several figures in Greek mythology, including:
  - Deidamia (daughter of Lycomedes), in Greek mythology, a lover of Achilles
  - Deidamia (wife of Pirithous), also known as Hippodamia, abducted by the Centaurs in Greek mythology
- Deidamia I of Epirus, wife of Demetrius Poliorcetes in Ancient Greece
- Deidamia II of Epirus, last ruler of the Aeacid dynasty
- Deidamia (opera), by George Frideric Handel
- Deidamia, a former genus of crustaceans, now included in Willemoesia, family Polychelidae
- Deidamia (moth), a genus of insects in the family Sphingidae
- Deidamia (plant), a genus of flowering plants in the family Passifloraceae
