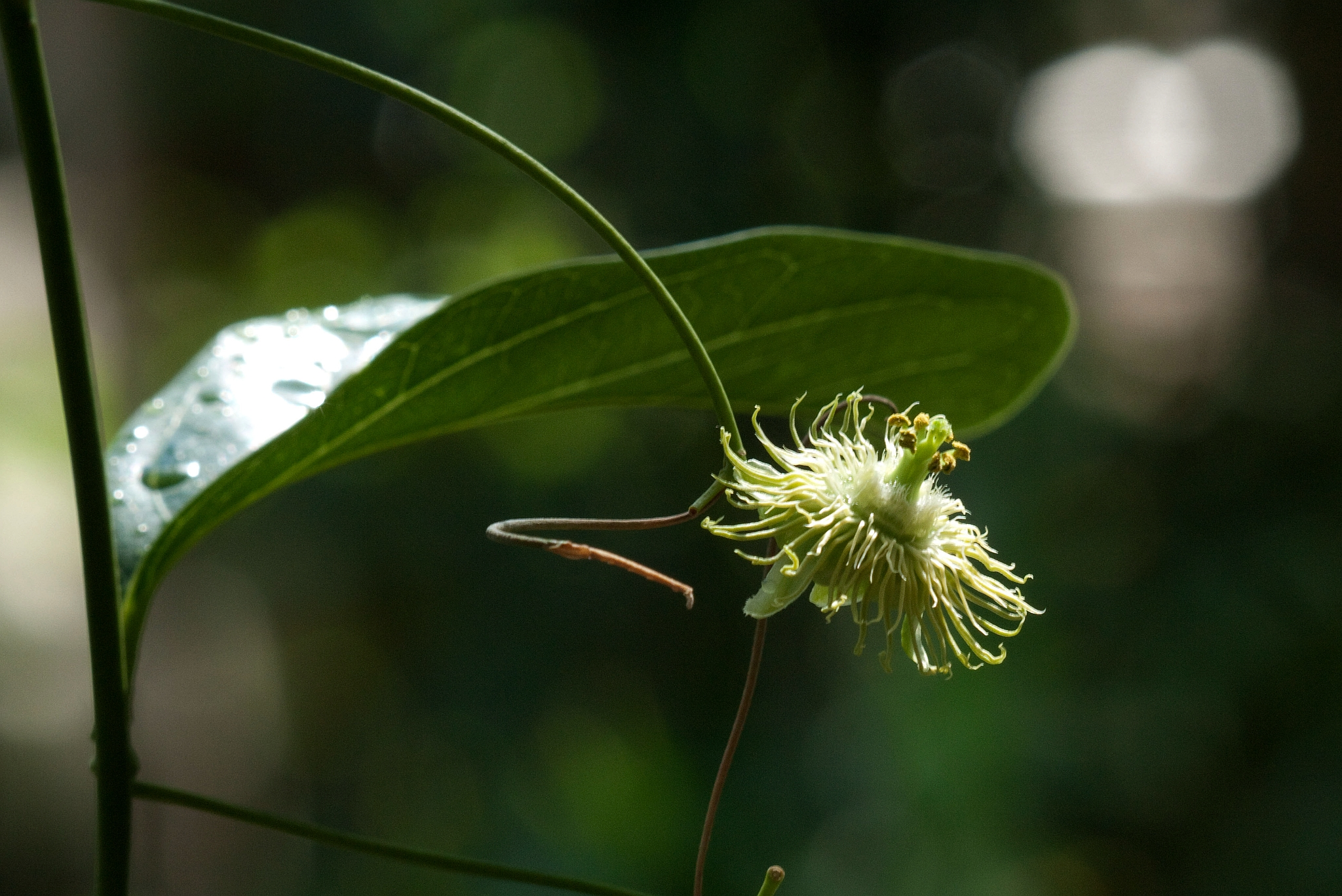

Conservation status
- Least Concern (NCA)

Scientific classification
- Kingdom: Plantae
- Clade: Tracheophytes
- Clade: Angiosperms
- Clade: Eudicots
- Clade: Rosids
- Order: Malpighiales
- Family: Passifloraceae
- Genus: Passiflora
- Species: P. kuranda

Binomial name
- Passiflora kuranda Krosnick & A.J.Ford
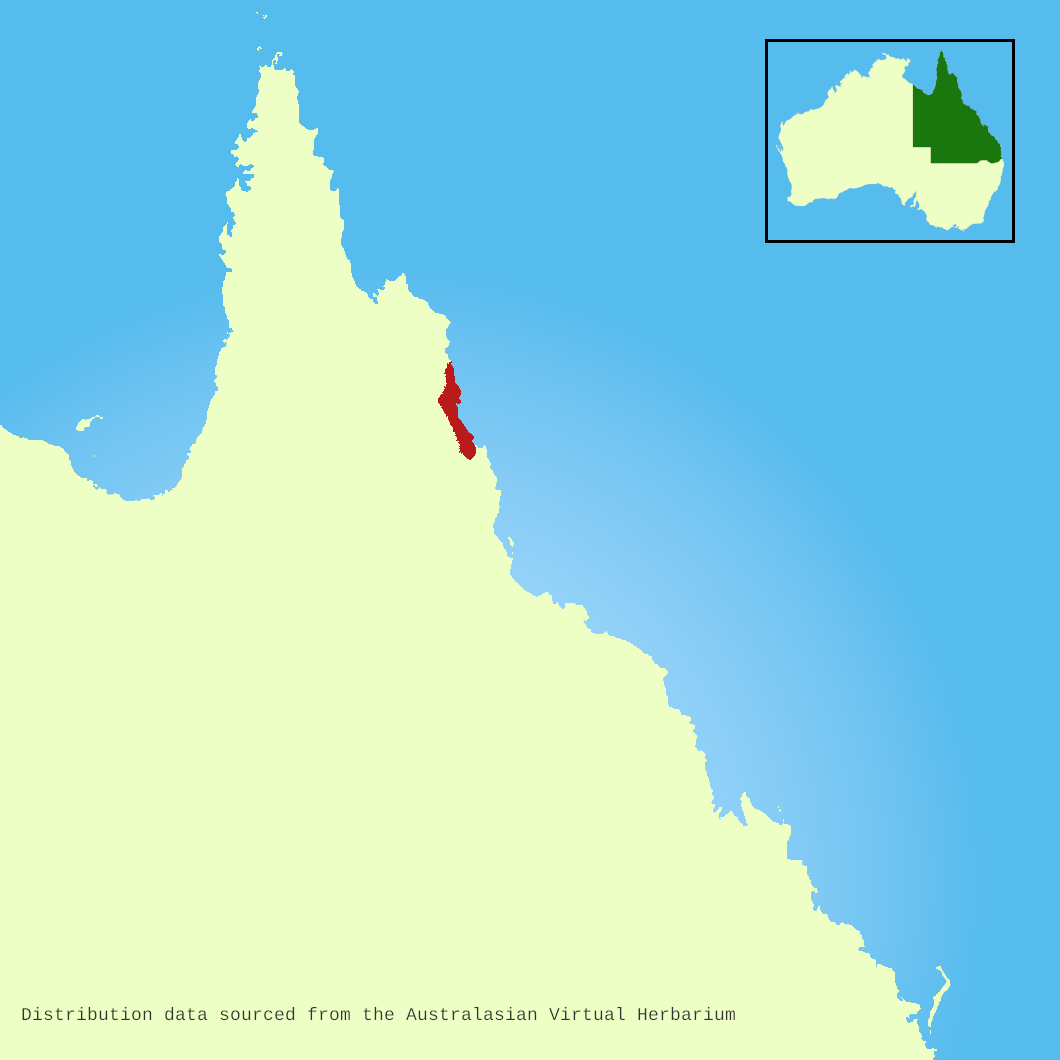

= Passiflora kuranda =

Kuranda passionfruit

Species of flowering plant

Passiflora kuranda is a plant in the passionfruit family Passifloraceae found only in northeastern Queensland, Australia. It is a tendril climber to about 15 m (49 ft) long and 8 cm (3.1 in) diameter, with simple leaves up to 17 cm (6.7 in) long and 7.5 cm (3.0 in) wide. The flowers are about 3 cm (1.2 in) wide and the fruit is about 9 cm (3.5 in) long, 7 cm (2.8 in) wide and green when ripe. It inhabits rainforest from Cooktown southwards to Cairns and the Atherton Tableland, at altitudes from near sea level to about 900 m (3,000 ft).

== Taxonomy ==
Passiflora kuranda was first described by Shawn Elizabeth Krosnick and Andrew James Ford in 2009. The type specimen was collected by Ford in 2003 near Atherton, Queensland. Their paper was published in the journal Systematic Botany.

== Conservation ==
This species is listed by Queensland's Department of Environment and Science as least concern. As of January 2024, it has not been assessed by the IUCN.

== Gallery ==
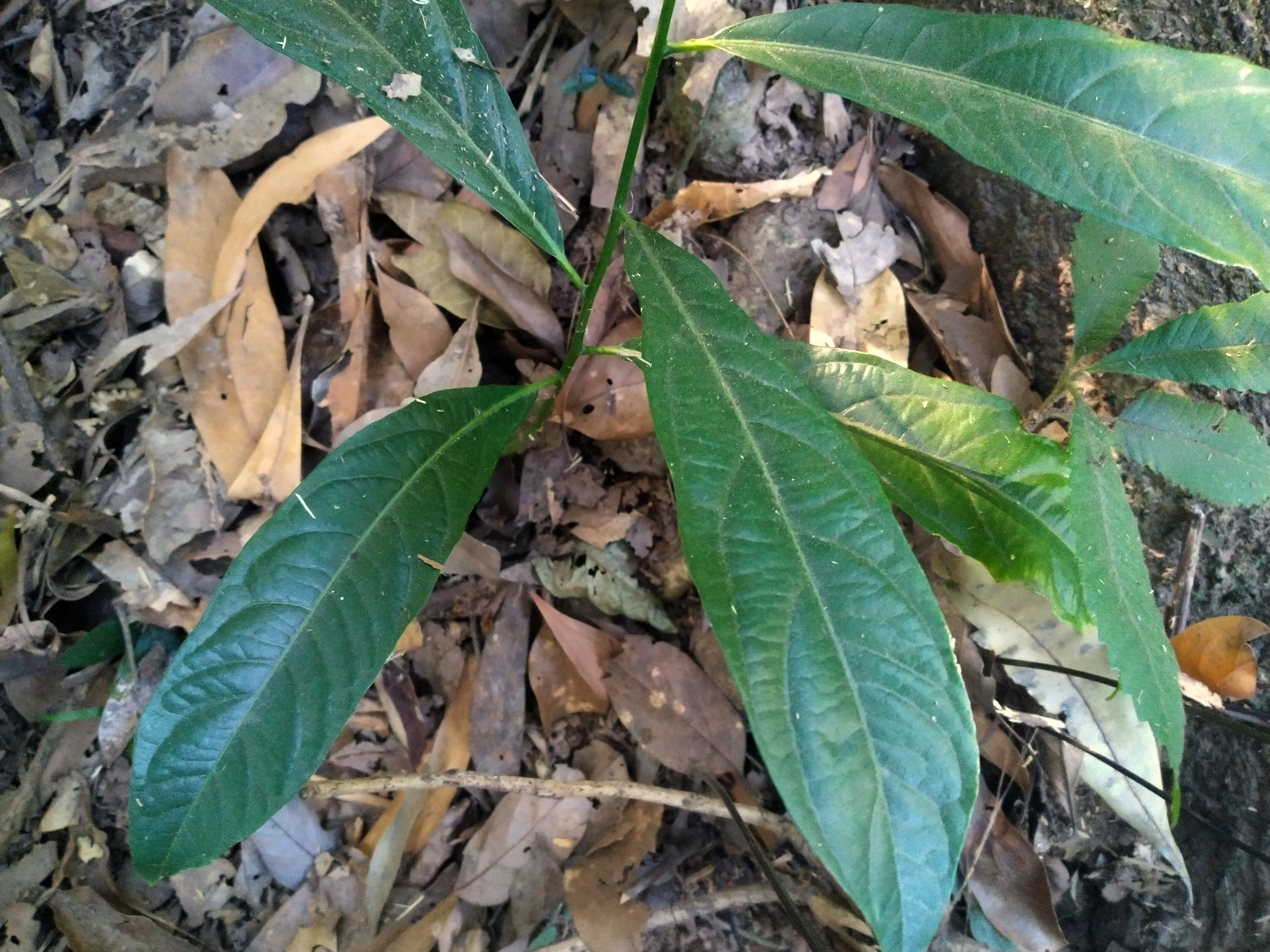

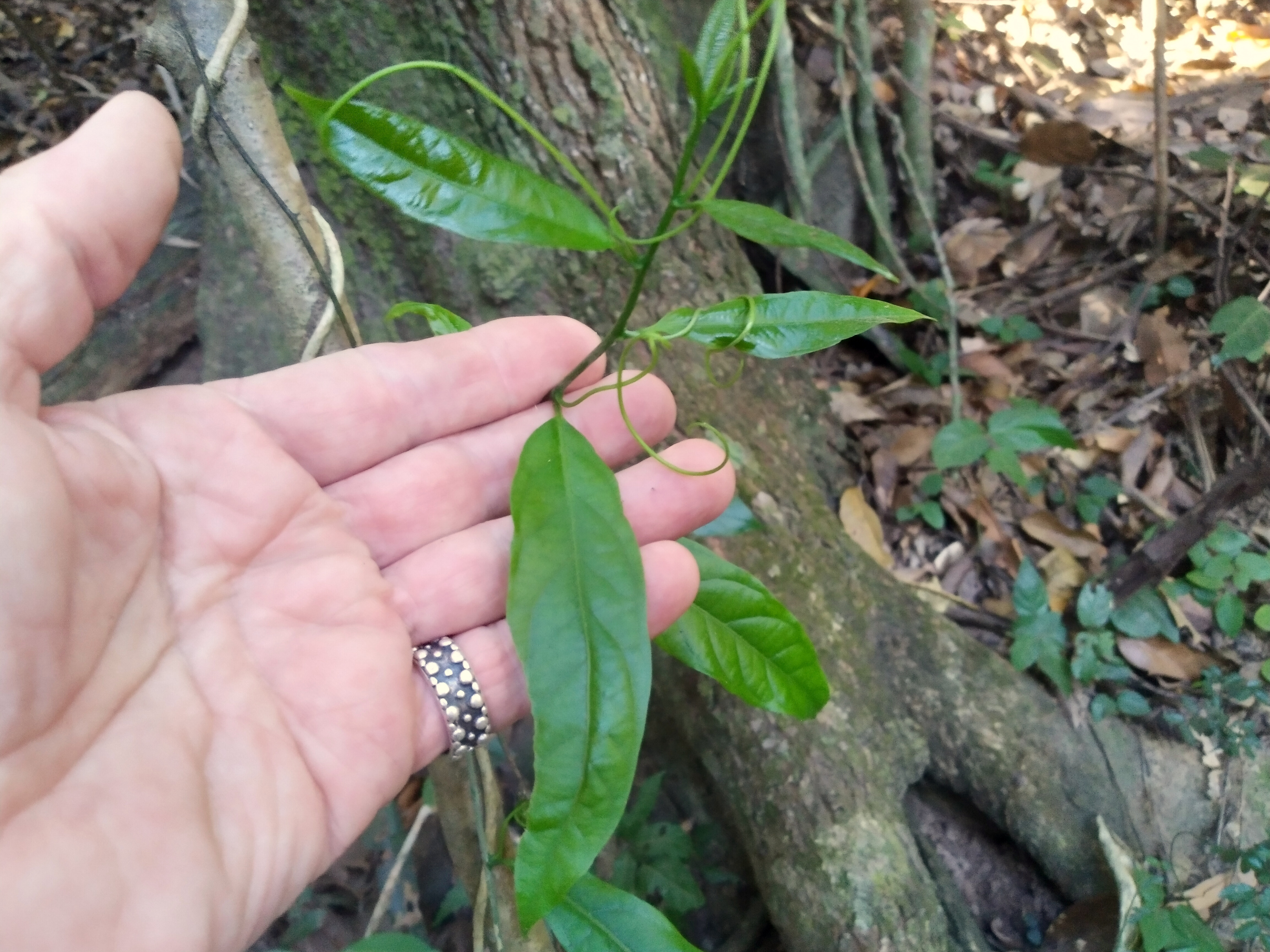

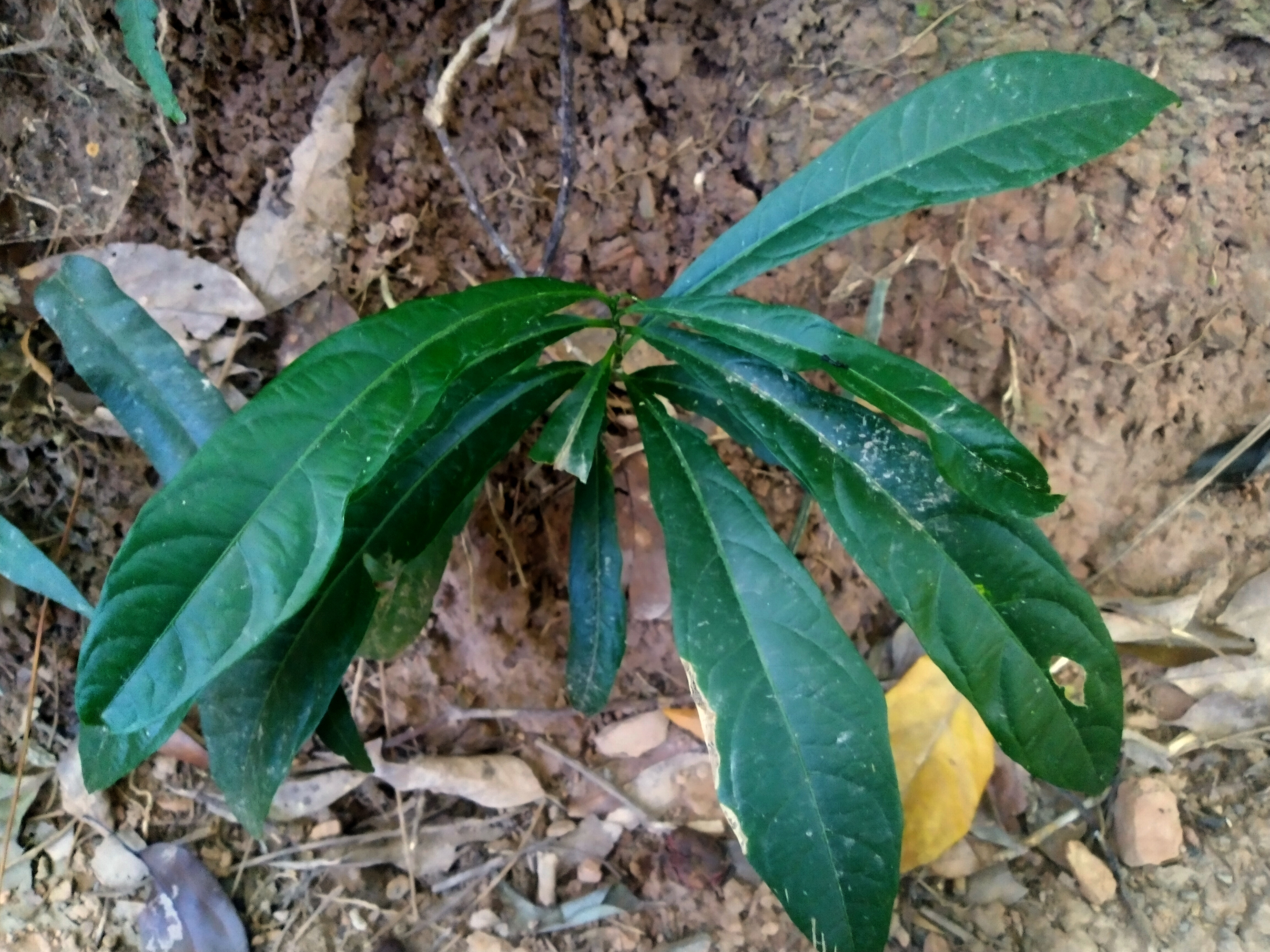
