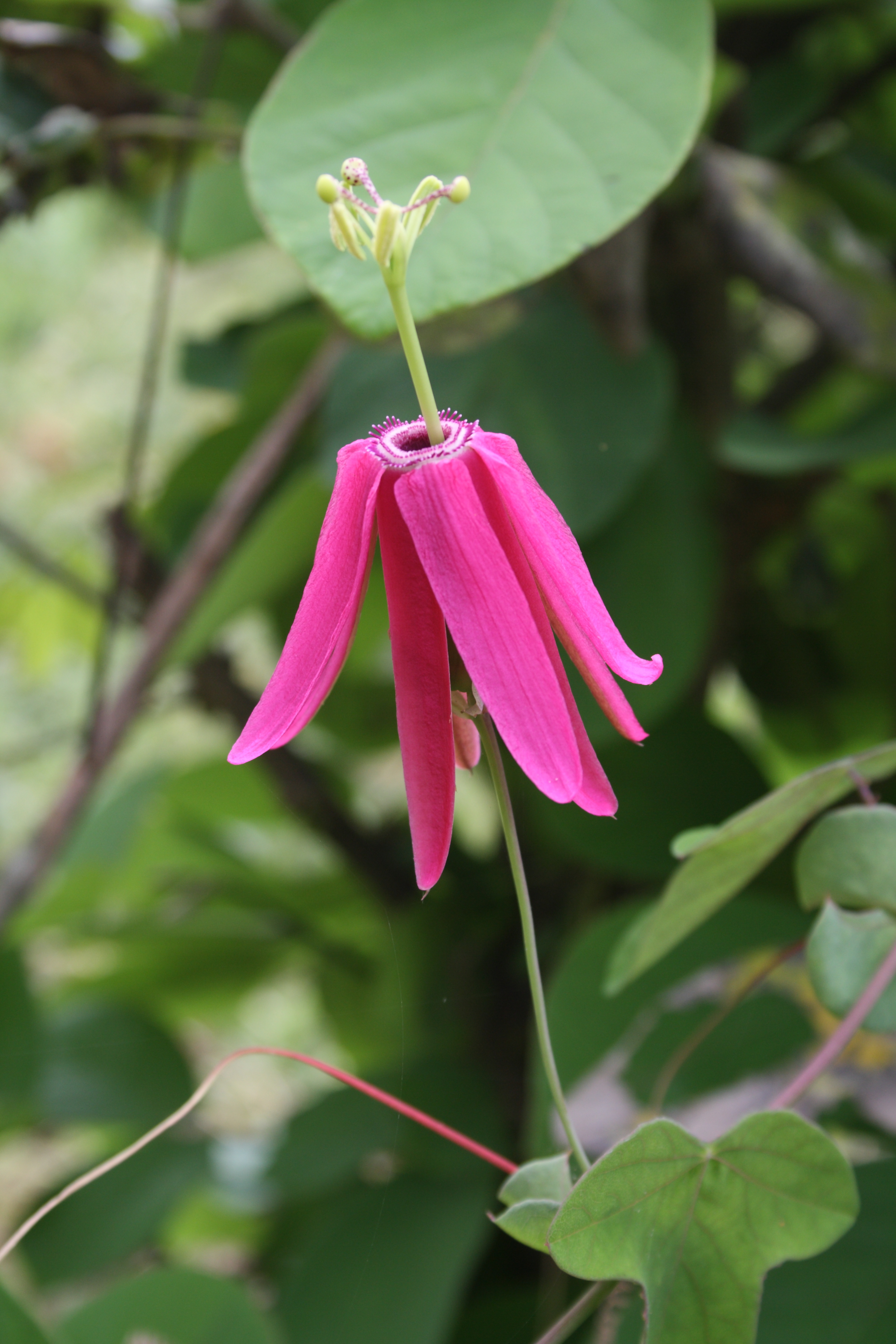

Conservation status
- Near Threatened (IUCN 3.1)

Scientific classification
- Kingdom: Plantae
- Clade: Tracheophytes
- Clade: Angiosperms
- Clade: Eudicots
- Clade: Rosids
- Order: Malpighiales
- Family: Passifloraceae
- Genus: Passiflora
- Species: P. reflexiflora

Binomial name
- Passiflora reflexiflora Cav.

Synonyms
- Tacsonia reflexiflora (Cav.) Juss. Erndelia reflexiflora Raf. Passiflora hastata Ruiz & Pav. ex Mast. Tacsonia hastata Ruiz & Pav. ex Mast. Tacsonia laevis Benth.

= Passiflora reflexiflora =

Species of vine

Passiflora reflexiflora is a species of plant in the family Passifloraceae. It is endemic to Guayas, Ecuador.
