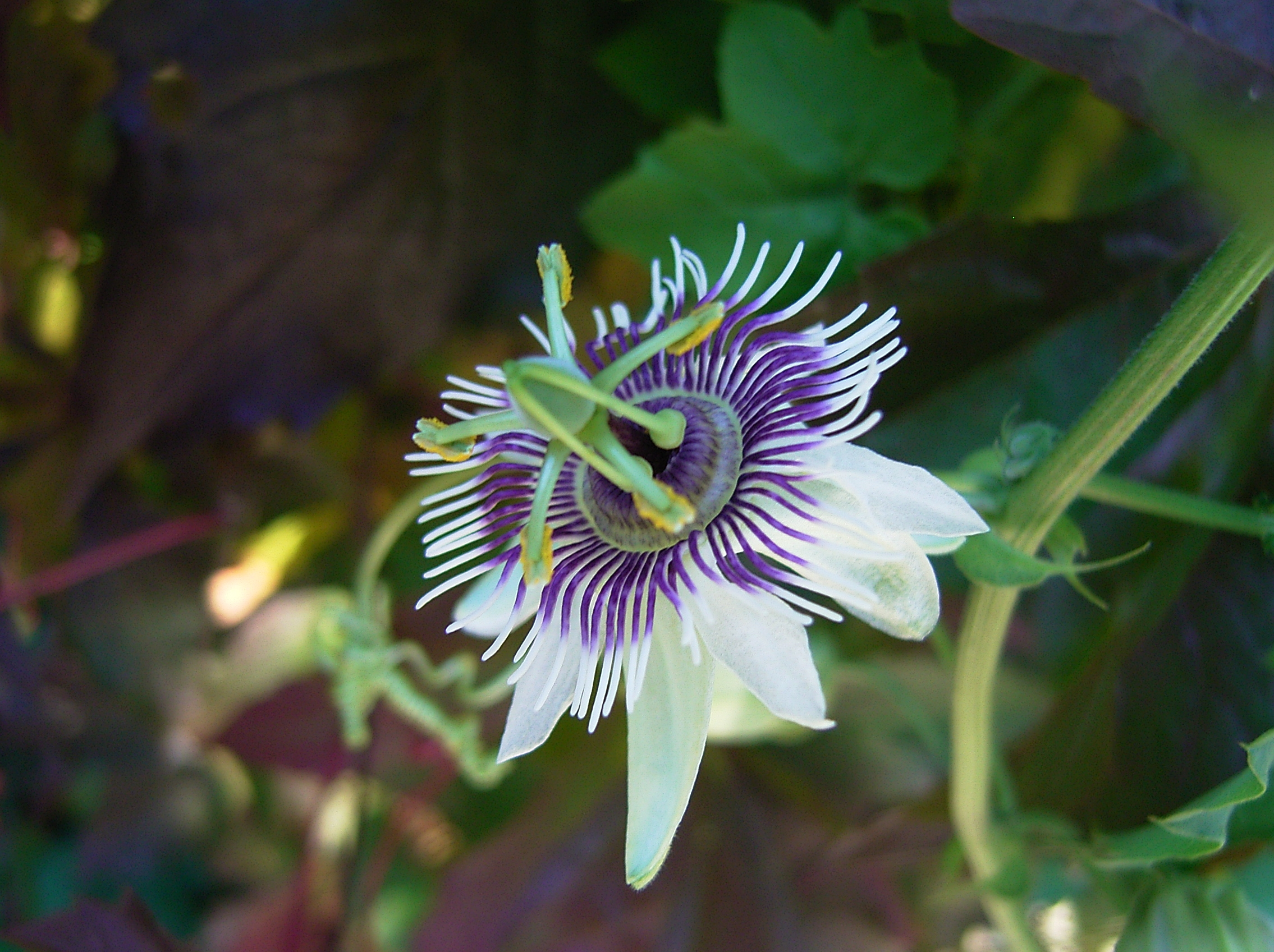
- Passiflora morifolia flower
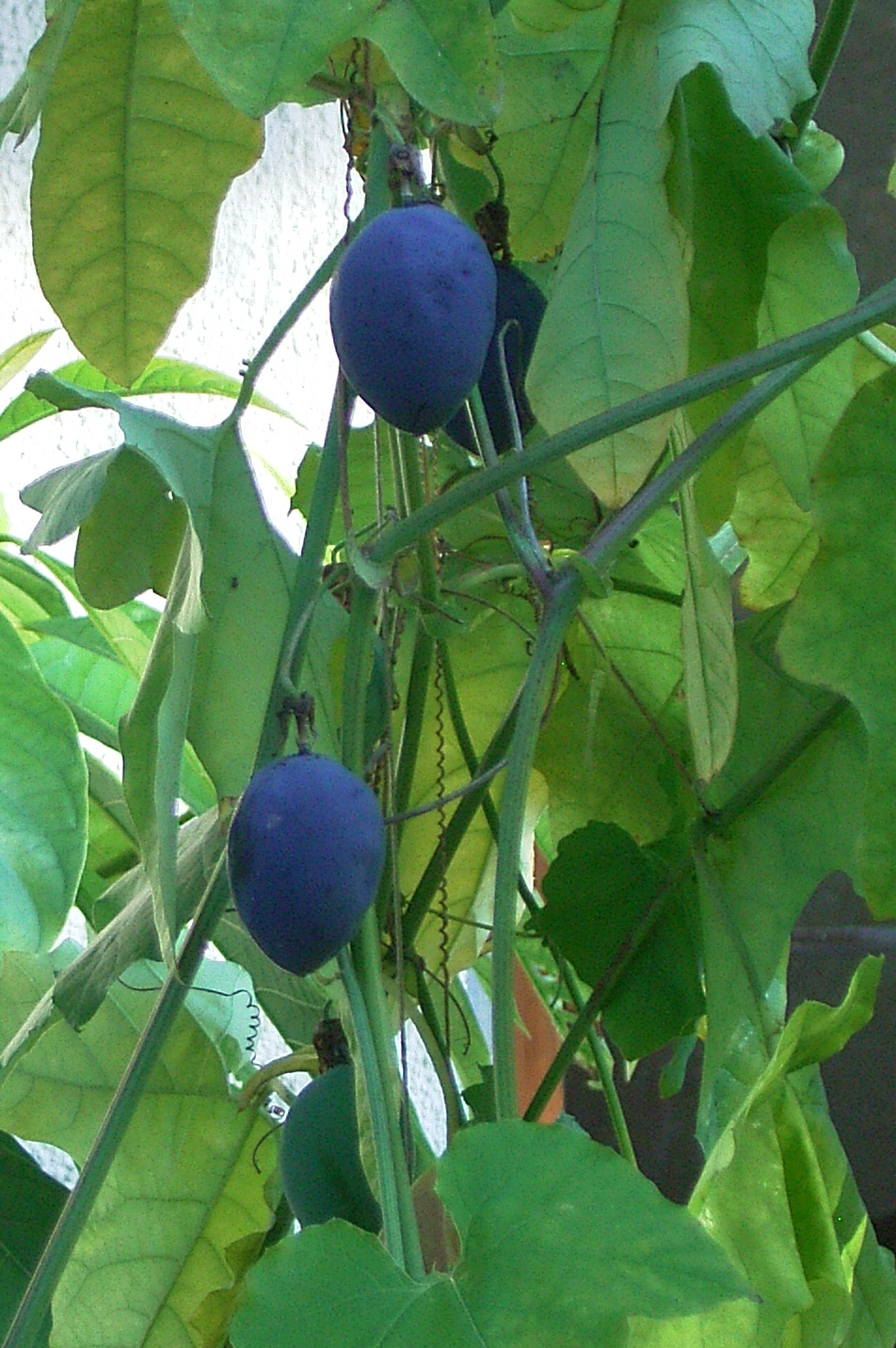
- Ripe Passiflora morifolia fruits

Scientific classification
- Kingdom: Plantae
- Clade: Tracheophytes
- Clade: Angiosperms
- Clade: Eudicots
- Clade: Rosids
- Order: Malpighiales
- Family: Passifloraceae
- Genus: Passiflora
- Species: P. morifolia

Binomial name
- Passiflora morifolia Mast.

Synonyms
- Heterotypic Synonyms: Passiflora dumetosa Barb.Rodr.; Passiflora erosa Rusby; Passiflora heydei Killip; Passiflora warmingii Mast.; Passiflora warmingii subsp. chacoensis R.E.Fr.; Passiflora weberiana Mast.

= Passiflora morifolia =

Species of vine

Passiflora morifolia is a species of flowering plant in the family Passifloraceae. It is sometimes referred to by the common names the blue sweet calabash or woodland passionflower. It grows as a twiner, with white and purple flowers and blue or purple fruit. The very fast-growing vine can grow a few dozen feet in a season. Flowers are ornate, white, blue and purple fruits follow, which ripen to blue or purple. The orange pulp is edible, but not particularly flavoursome. The hardiness of P. morifolia is to at least 32 °F (0 °C), some sources claim as low as 15 to 20 °F (−9 to −7 °C). It grows well in full sun or filtered sun. The vine is fast growing and once established it is quite vigorous. Its propagation is by seed or by cuttings. It is grown as an ornamental. It is not cultivated for its fruit. It is native to Argentina, Bolivia, Brazil, Colombia, Ecuador, Guatemala, Mexico, Paraguay, Peru, and Venezuela.
