= Passiflora anfracta =

Conservation status
- Endangered (IUCN 3.1)

Scientific classification
- Kingdom: Plantae
- Clade: Tracheophytes
- Clade: Angiosperms
- Clade: Eudicots
- Clade: Rosids
- Order: Malpighiales
- Family: Passifloraceae
- Genus: Passiflora
- Species: P. anfracta

Binomial name
- Passiflora anfracta Mast. ex Andrè

Species of vine

Passiflora anfracta is a species of flowering plant in the Passifloraceae family. It is a passion flower that is endemic to Ecuador.
