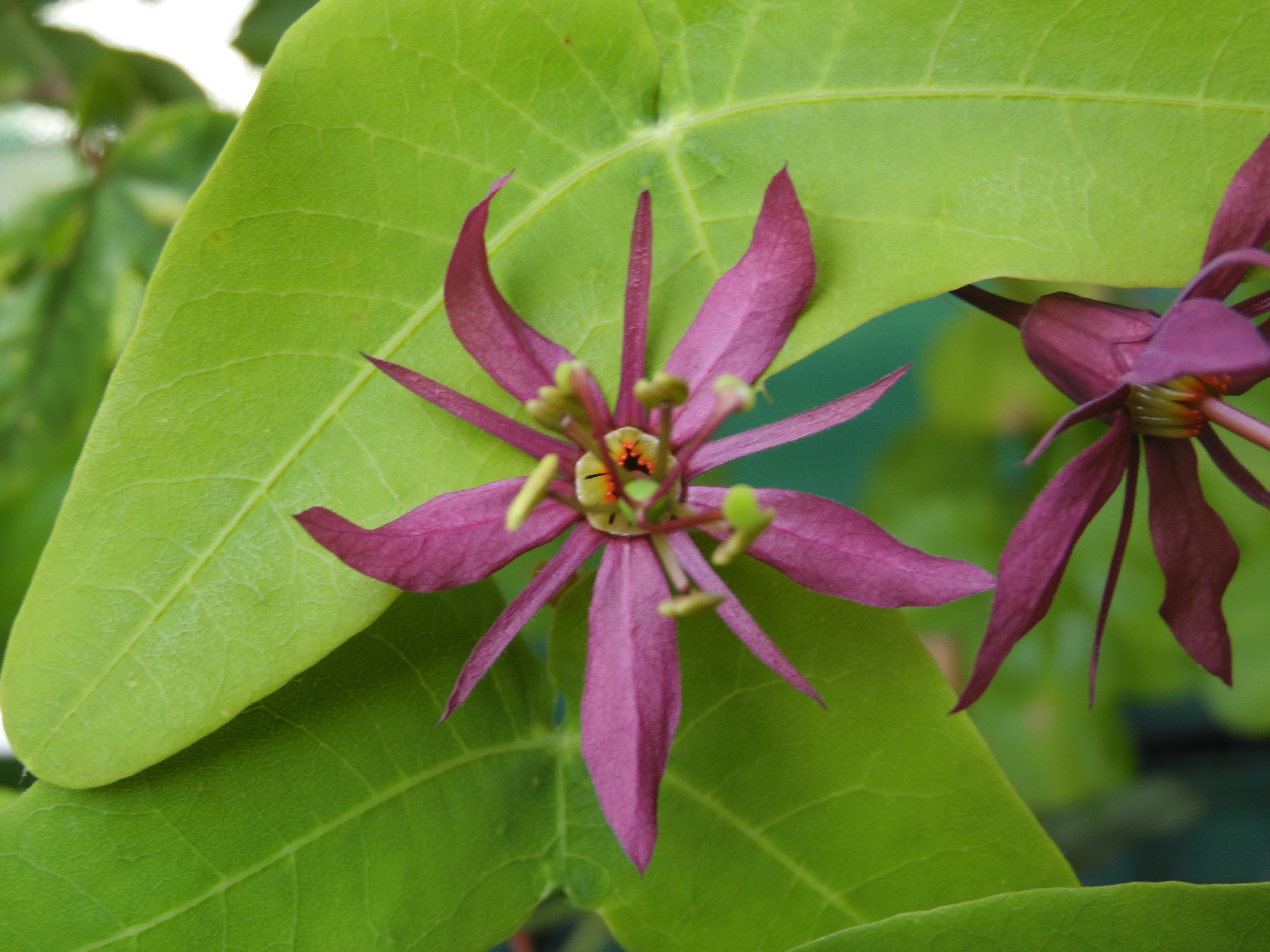
- Passiflora perfoliata

Scientific classification
- Kingdom: Plantae
- Clade: Tracheophytes
- Clade: Angiosperms
- Clade: Eudicots
- Clade: Rosids
- Order: Malpighiales
- Family: Passifloraceae
- Genus: Passiflora
- Species: P. perfoliata

Binomial name
- Passiflora perfoliata L.

= Passiflora perfoliata =

Species of plant

Passiflora perfoliata is a species of plant in the family Passifloraceae.

== Sources ==
This article incorporates text from a free content work. Licensed under CC0 (license statement/permission). Text taken from Passiflora perfoliata. Encyclopedia of Life.
