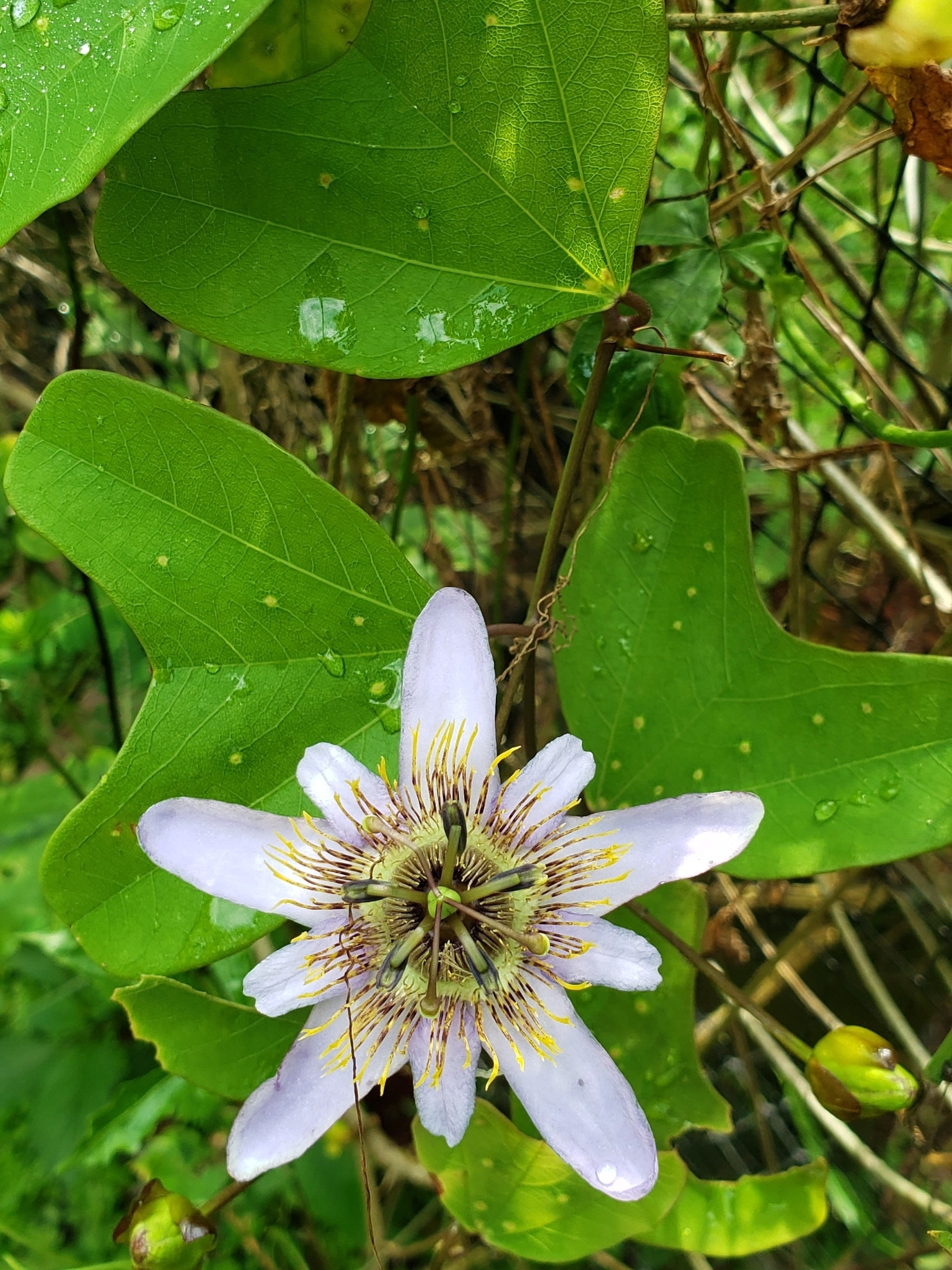

Scientific classification
- Kingdom: Plantae
- Clade: Tracheophytes
- Clade: Angiosperms
- Clade: Eudicots
- Clade: Rosids
- Order: Malpighiales
- Family: Passifloraceae
- Genus: Passiflora
- Species: P. bicornis

Binomial name
- Passiflora bicornis Mill.

= Passiflora bicornis =

Species of plant

Passiflora bicornis, also known by its common name wingleaf passionflower, is a species of passion vine (genus Passiflora).

== Description ==
Passiflora bicornis has long stems, leaves with rounded lobes and eye-like glands, and blue flowers with yellow and reddish-purple parts. It produces small dark purple fruits with ridged seeds.

== Range ==
Passiflora bicornis can be found in Colombia, Costa Rica and Panama.

== Similar species ==
Passiflora bicornis looks similar to Passiflora apetala, Passiflora biflora, Passiflora boenderi, and Passiflora standleyi but stands out because of its longer flower stalks and leaf-like structures.
