= Crossostemma =

Scientific classification
- Kingdom: Plantae
- Clade: Tracheophytes
- Clade: Angiosperms
- Clade: Eudicots
- Clade: Rosids
- Order: Malpighiales
- Family: Passifloraceae
- Genus: Crossostemma; Planch. ex Benth.
- Species: C. laurifolium

Binomial name
- Crossostemma laurifolium Planch. ex Benth.

Genus of flowering plants

Crossostemma is a genus of flowering plants belonging to the family Passifloraceae. The only species is Crossostemma laurifolium.

Its native range is Western Tropical Africa to Cameroon.
