= Pibiria =

Scientific classification
- Kingdom: Plantae
- Clade: Tracheophytes
- Clade: Angiosperms
- Clade: Eudicots
- Clade: Rosids
- Order: Malpighiales
- Family: Passifloraceae
- Subfamily: Pibirioideae; M.W.Chase & Christenh.
- Genus: Pibiria; Maas
- Species: P. flava

Binomial name
- Pibiria flava Maas
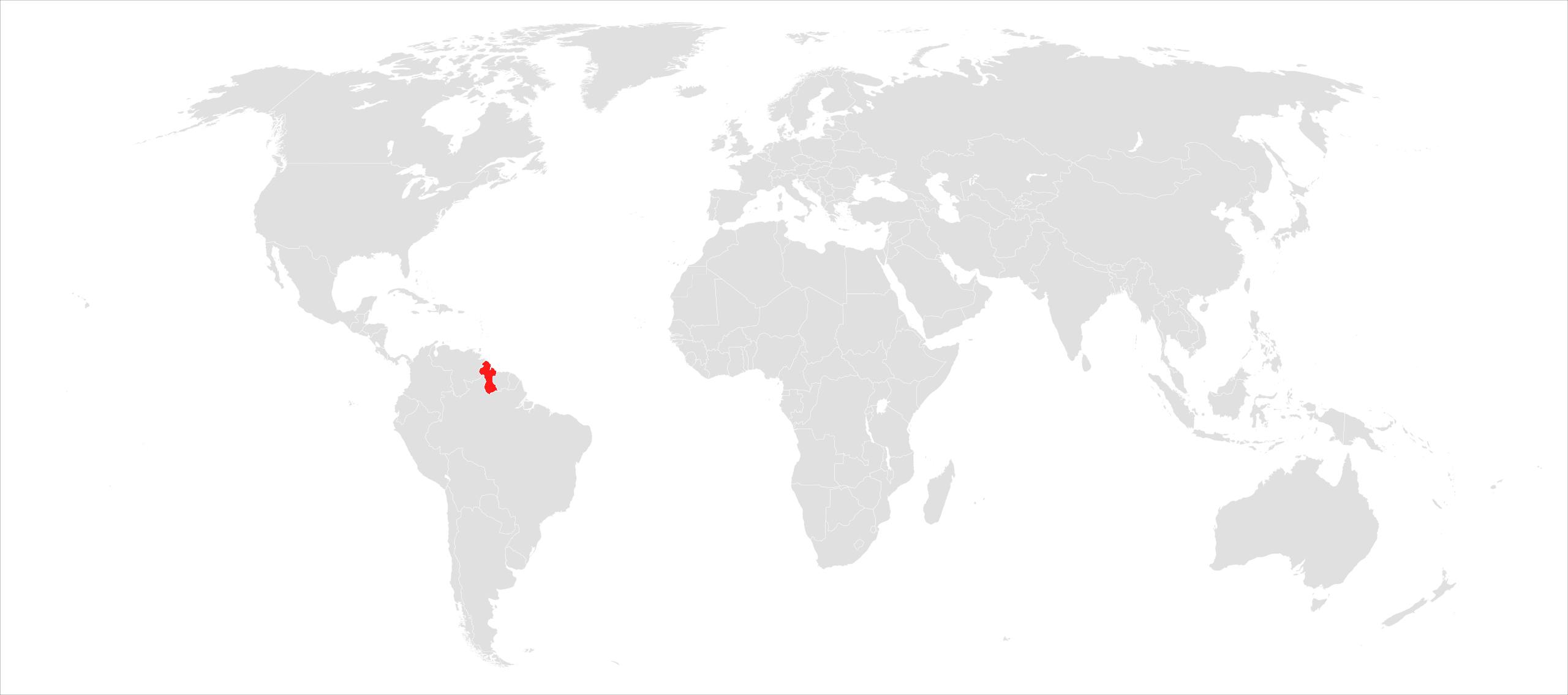

Genus of plants

Pibiria is a genus consisting of only one species, Pibiria flava. The genus is the only member of the subfamily Pibirioideae (Passifloraceae).

== Pibiria flava ==
Pibiria flava, the sole member of Pibiria, was identified, but unclassified, in 1993. It is a woody subtropical bush with yellow flowers. DNA, morphology, and reproductive analysis suggests the species is closely related to Turneroideae, but divergent enough to justify a different subfamily. The type specimen was collected at Mabura Hill in central Guyana.
