= Ancistrothyrsus =

Scientific classification
- Kingdom: Plantae
- Clade: Tracheophytes
- Clade: Angiosperms
- Clade: Eudicots
- Clade: Rosids
- Order: Malpighiales
- Family: Passifloraceae
- Subfamily: Passifloroideae
- Tribe: Passifloreae
- Genus: Ancistrothyrsus; Harms

Genus of flowering plants

Ancistrothyrsus is a genus of flowering plants belonging to the family Passifloraceae.

Its native range is Venezuela to Peru.

Species:

- Ancistrothyrsus hirtellus A.H.Gentry
- Ancistrothyrsus tessmannii Harms
