= Paropsiopsis =

Scientific classification
- Kingdom: Plantae
- Clade: Tracheophytes
- Clade: Angiosperms
- Clade: Eudicots
- Clade: Rosids
- Order: Malpighiales
- Family: Passifloraceae
- Subfamily: Passifloroideae
- Tribe: Paropsieae
- Genus: Paropsiopsis; Engl.

Genus of flowering plants

Paropsiopsis is a genus of flowering plants belonging to the family Passifloraceae.

Its native range is west-central tropical Africa (Cabinda, Cameroon, Democratic Republic of the Congo, and Gabon).

== Known species ==
As accepted by Kew:

- Paropsiopsis atrichogyna J.M.de Vos & Breteler
- Paropsiopsis decandra (Baill.) Sleumer
