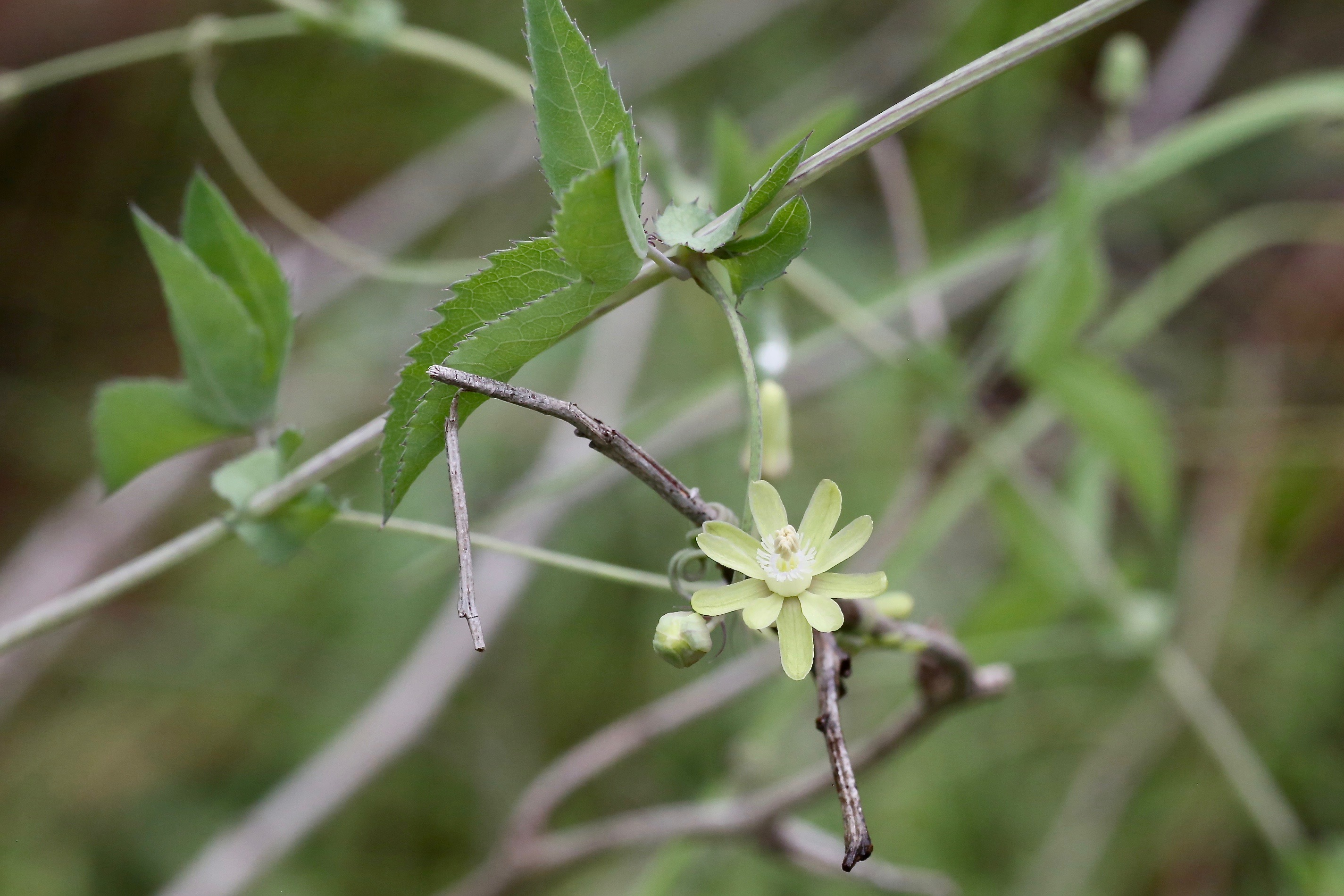

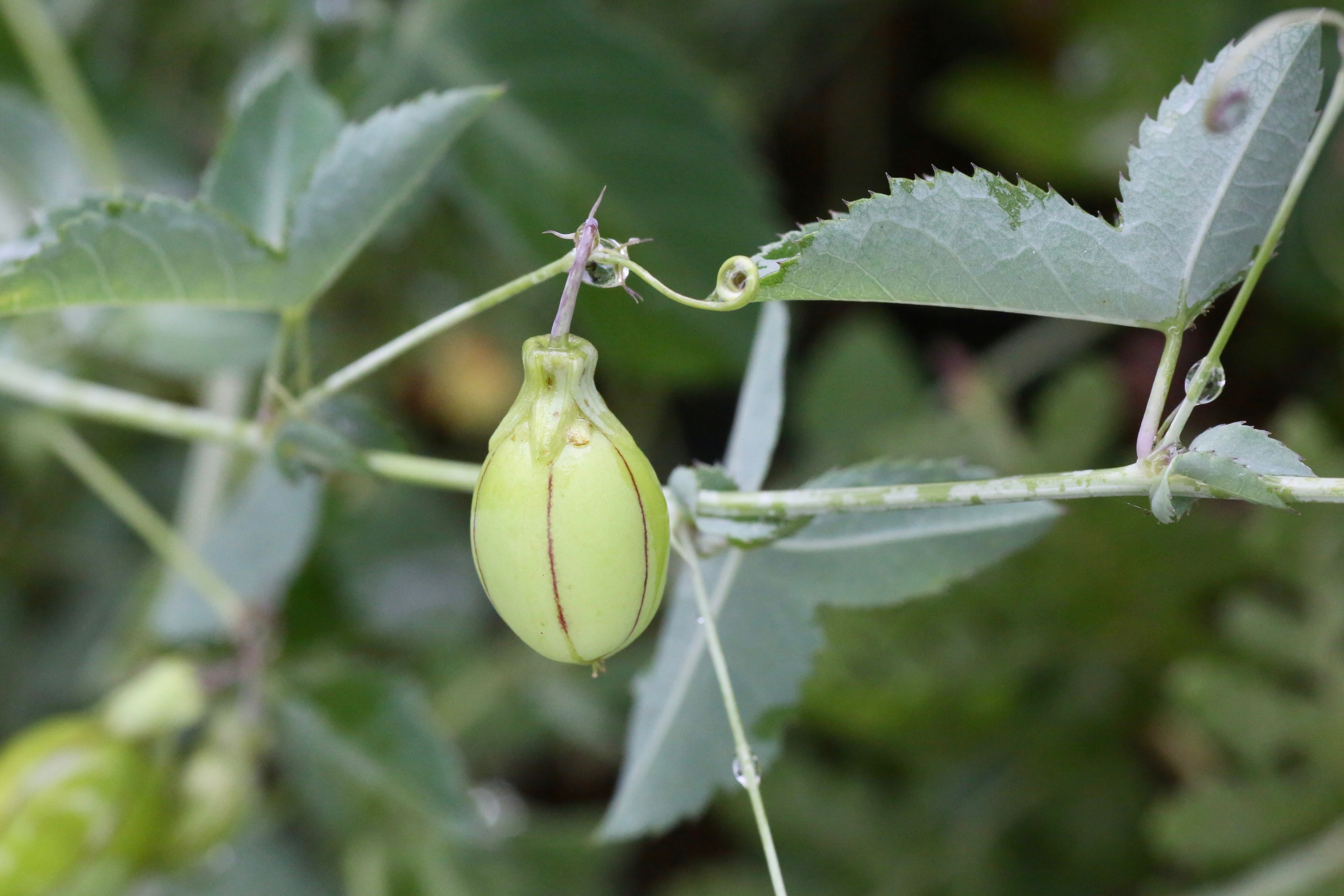
- Flower and fruit of B. triloba

Scientific classification
- Kingdom: Plantae
- Clade: Tracheophytes
- Clade: Angiosperms
- Clade: Eudicots
- Clade: Rosids
- Order: Malpighiales
- Family: Passifloraceae
- Subfamily: Passifloroideae
- Tribe: Passifloreae
- Genus: Basananthe; Peyr.

= Basananthe =

Genus of flowering plants

Basananthe is a genus of flowering plants belonging to the family Passifloraceae.

Its native range is dry Tropical Africa.

Species:

- Basananthe aciphylla Thulin
- Basananthe apetala (Baker f.) J.J.de Wilde
- Basananthe aristolochioides A.Robyns
- Basananthe baumii (Harms) J.J.de Wilde
- Basananthe berberoides (Chiov.) J.J.de Wilde
- Basananthe botryoidea A.Robyns
- Basananthe cupricola A.Robyns
- Basananthe gossweileri (Hutch. & K.Pearce) J.J.de Wilde
- Basananthe hanningtoniana (Mast.) J.J.de Wilde
- Basananthe hederae de Wilde
- Basananthe heterophylla Schinz
- Basananthe hispidula J.J.de Wilde
- Basananthe holmesii R.Fern. & A.Fern.
- Basananthe kisimbae Malaisse & Bamps
- Basananthe kottoensis J.J.de Wilde
- Basananthe kundelunguensis A.Robyns
- Basananthe lanceolata (Engl.) J.J.de Wilde
- Basananthe littoralis Peyr.
- Basananthe longifolia (Harms) R.Fern. & A.Fern.
- Basananthe malaissei A.Robyns
- Basananthe merolae Raimondo & Moggi
- Basananthe nummularia Welw.
- Basananthe papillosa (A.Fern. & R.Fern.) J.J.de Wilde
- Basananthe parvifolia (Baker f.) J.J.de Wilde
- Basananthe pedata (Baker f.) J.J.de Wilde
- Basananthe phaulantha (Dandy) J.J.de Wilde
- Basananthe polygaloides (Hutch. & K.Pearce) J.J.de Wilde
- Basananthe pseudostipulata J.J.de Wilde
- Basananthe pubiflora J.J.de Wilde
- Basananthe reticulata (Baker f.) J.J.de Wilde
- Basananthe sandersonii (Harv.) J.J.de Wilde
- Basananthe scabrida A.Robyns
- Basananthe scabrifolia (Dandy) J.J.de Wilde
- Basananthe spinosa J.J.de Wilde
- Basananthe subsessilicarpa J.B.Gillett ex Verdc.
- Basananthe triloba (Bolus) J.J.de Wilde
- Basananthe zanzibarica (Mast.) J.J.de Wilde
