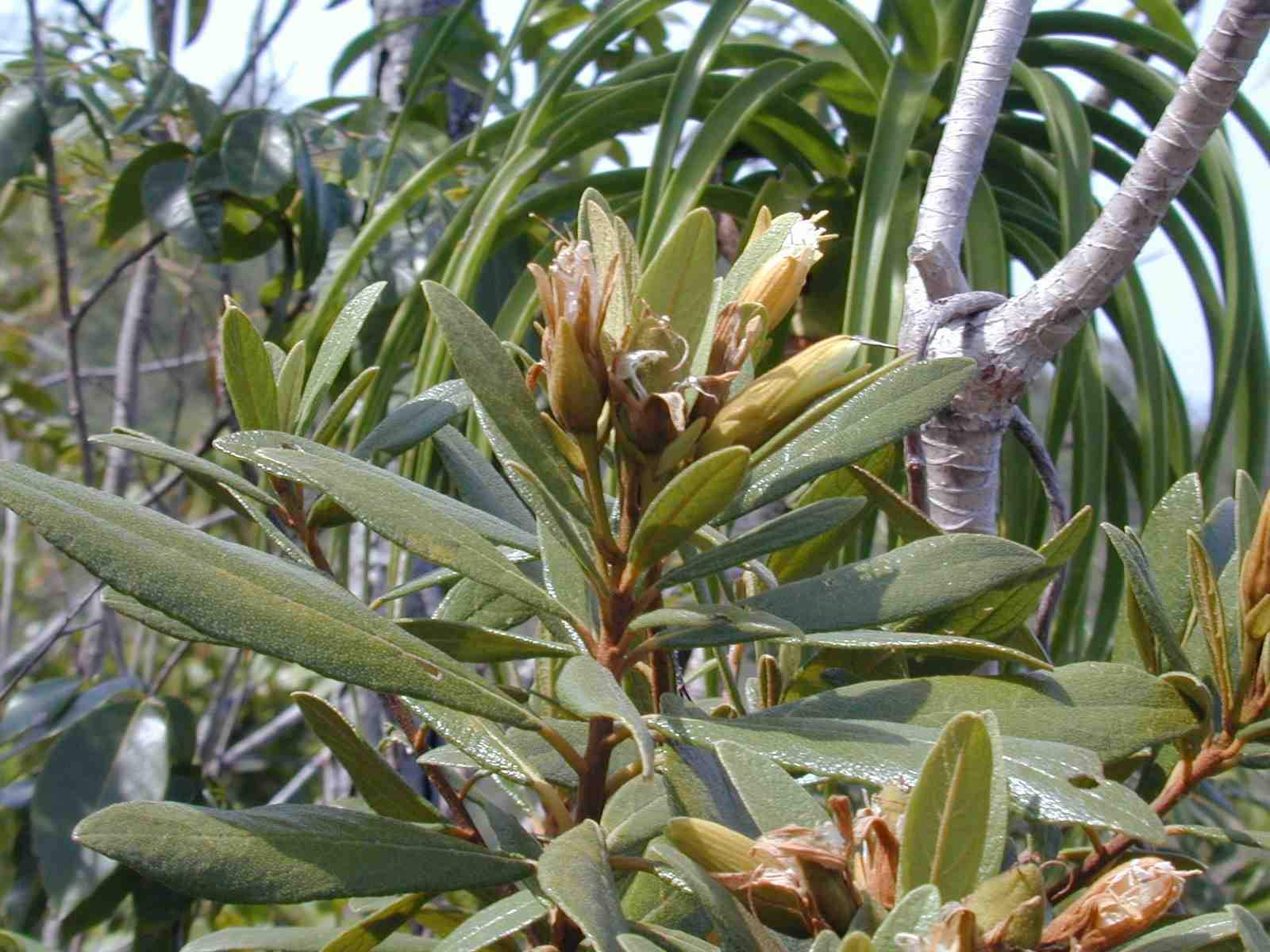

Conservation status
- Vulnerable (IUCN 3.1)

Scientific classification
- Kingdom: Plantae
- Clade: Tracheophytes
- Clade: Angiosperms
- Clade: Eudicots
- Clade: Rosids
- Order: Malpighiales
- Family: Passifloraceae
- Subfamily: Turneroideae
- Genus: Adenoa; Arbo.
- Species: A. cubensis

Binomial name
- Adenoa cubensis Arbo.
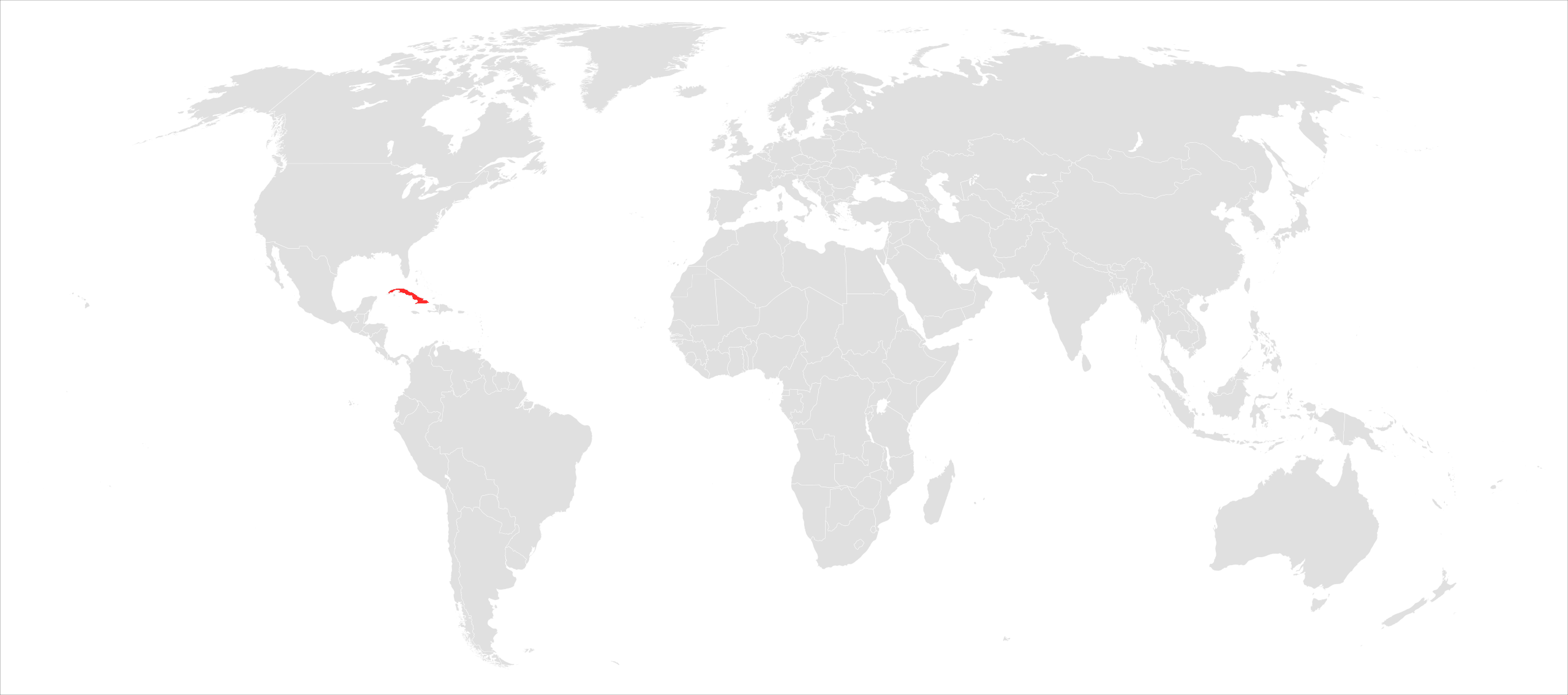

Synonyms
- Piriqueta cubensis

= Adenoa =

Genus of flowering plants

Adenoa cubensis is the only member of Adenoa, a monotypic genus of flowering plants.

== Description ==
=== Morphology ===
A. cubensis is a shrub 1-3 meters tall, with leaves described as oblanceolate or obovate, 4-8 cm long and 1-2.2 cm wide. Seeds are described as pyriform. A. cubensis lacks glandular hairs and has vegetative colleters.

==== Flower morphology ====
A. cubensis has white homostylous flowers (3 cm) with protruding styles, free penduncles (1.5 cm), and short pedicels (0.5 cm). The stamen of A. cubensis are free, similar to those found in Piriqueta. The anthers are obtuse. Overall, the flowers of A. cubensis are considered more complex than those found in Erblichia but simpler than those found in Turnera and Piriqueta. In addition to the differences in flower complexity, there are differences between A. cubensis' pollen exine and the exine of other members of Turneroideae.

=== Karyotype ===
A. cubensis is a diploid species (2n=14). Its chromosomes are similar in size to that of Turnera but larger than that of Piriqueta.

== Taxonomy ==
Originally, classified as Piriqueta cubensis by Britton & P.Wilson in 1915, it would later be reclassified as Adenoa by MM Arbo in 1977.

== Distribution ==
A. cubensis is native to southeast Cuba. It can be found in La Mensura-Pilotos, Pico Cristal, and Alejandro de Humboldt national parks, and Loma Miraflores Managed Flora Reserve.

Herbarium specimens have been collected between Rio Yamaniguey and Camp Toa, Oriente Province, and Sierra de Nipe.

== Conservation status ==
As of 2023, A. cubensis is classified as vulnerable. There are at least 10 localities, but the number of mature individuals and area occupied by the localities is decreasing. This decrease is likely the result of mining, fires, logging, forest management and urbanization. The species is found in several national parks and floristic reserves.
