= Viridivia =

Scientific classification
- Kingdom: Plantae
- Clade: Embryophytes
- Clade: Tracheophytes
- Clade: Angiosperms
- Clade: Eudicots
- Clade: Rosids
- Order: Malpighiales
- Family: Passifloraceae
- Subfamily: Passifloroideae
- Tribe: Paropsieae
- Genus: Viridivia; J.H.Hemsl. & Verdc.
- Species: V. suberosa

Binomial name
- Viridivia suberosa J.H.Hemsl. & Verdc.

Genus of flowering plants

Viridivia is a monotypic genus of flowering plants belonging to the family Passifloraceae. It only contain one known species, Viridivia suberosa. It is also in the subfamily Passifloroideae and tribe Paropsieae.

It is native to Zambia and Tanzania. It grows within woodland on rocky outcrops.

== Description ==
It is a small tree that can grow up to 8 m (26 ft) tall. It has older branches with longitudinally fissured cork-like bark. The young branches are spattered with short, stiff golden-yellow or brown hairs. It has bisexual flowers, which appear before leaves grow. The flower are dense racemes at the end of short branches. They have 4 sepals, which are imbricate (overlapping), sericeous silky with dense appressed hairs) on the outside and 3–7-nerved (or veined). It has 4 petals which are smaller than the sepals and 1-nerved. The corona is a short tubular shape, irregularly fimbriate (fringed) and with clavate (club shaped) whitish glands. It has 10–16 stamens, with the filaments (stamen stalks) free and hairy. The anthers are oblong shaped. It has a globose (round-like shaped) ovary which is stipitate (stalked) with 1-locular (or compartment). It has 4–6 styles with fleshy, kidney-shaped stigmas. It has about 50 ovules. The seed capsule is subglobose shaped and stipitate. Inside the capsule, the seeds are ovoid, compressed, included in a cupulate (cup-shaped) aril (seed coating).

== Taxonomy ==
In Zambia, it is commonly known as 'mulyansefu'.

The genus name of Viridivia is in honour of Percy James Greenway (1897–1980), South African botanist at the agricultural research station and herbarium in Nairobi, Kenya. The Latin for green is viridis. The Neo-Latin specific epithet of suberosa means cork-like. Both the genus and the species were first described and published in Hooker's Icon. Pl. Vol.36 on table 3555 in 1956.
