= Paropsia =

Scientific classification
- Kingdom: Plantae
- Clade: Tracheophytes
- Clade: Angiosperms
- Clade: Eudicots
- Clade: Rosids
- Order: Malpighiales
- Family: Passifloraceae
- Subfamily: Passifloroideae
- Tribe: Paropsieae
- Genus: Paropsia; Noronha ex Thouars

Genus of plants

Paropsia is a genus of flowering plants belonging to the family Passifloraceae.

Its native range is Tropical and Southern Africa.

== Species ==
Species:

- Paropsia braunii Gilg
- Paropsia brazzaeana Baill.
- Paropsia edulis Thouars
- Paropsia gabonica Breteler
- Paropsia grandiflora Sleumer
- Paropsia grewioides Welw. ex Mast.
- Paropsia guineensis Oliv.
- Paropsia humblotii H.Perrier
- Paropsia madagascariensis (Baill.) H.Perrier
- Paropsia obscura O.Hoffm.
- Paropsia perrieri Claverie
- Paropsia vareciformis (Griff.) Mast.
