= Jongkindia =

Scientific classification
- Kingdom: Plantae
- Clade: Tracheophytes
- Clade: Angiosperms
- Clade: Eudicots
- Clade: Rosids
- Order: Malpighiales
- Family: Passifloraceae
- Subfamily: Passifloroideae
- Tribe: Jongkindieae
- Genus: Jongkindia; Breteler & F.T.Bakker
- Species: J. mulbahii

Binomial name
- Jongkindia mulbahii Breteler & F.T.Bakker

Genus of flowering plants

Jongkindia is a genus of flowering plants in the family Passifloraceae. It contains a single species, Jongkindia mulbahii, a small tree endemic to Liberia.
