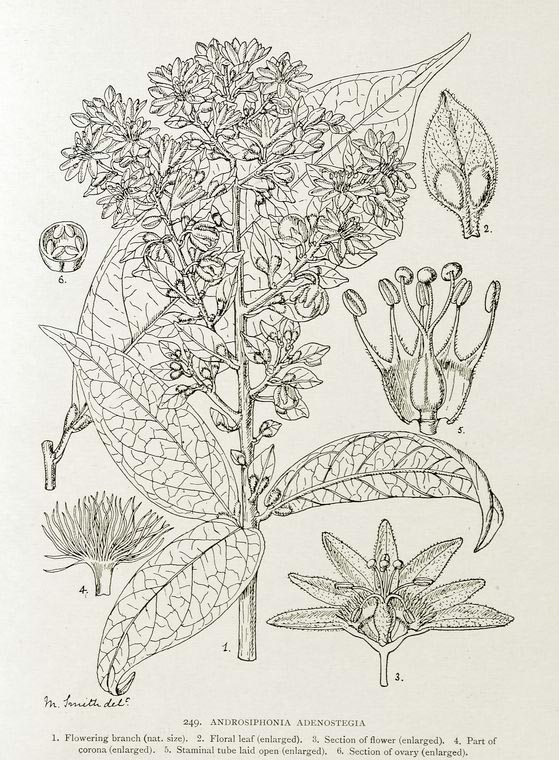
- Androsiphonia adenostegia

Scientific classification
- Kingdom: Plantae
- Clade: Tracheophytes
- Clade: Angiosperms
- Clade: Eudicots
- Clade: Rosids
- Order: Malpighiales
- Family: Passifloraceae
- Subfamily: Passifloroideae
- Tribe: Paropsieae
- Genus: Androsiphonia; Stapf
- Species: A. adenostegia

Binomial name
- Androsiphonia adenostegia Stapf

= Androsiphonia =

Genus of flowering plants

Androsiphonia is a genus of flowering plants belonging to Paropsieae a subfamily of Passifloraceae. It is a monotypic genus consisting of only one species, Androsiphonia adenostegia.

== Androsiphonia adenostegia Stapf ==
A. adenostegia (previously Paropsia adenostegia) is the sole member of Androsiphonia. The oldest written record of A. adenostegia dates to 1904. It is described as a shrub or small tree, growing up to 12 feet tall. It is native to forest and rainforests of Sierra Leone, Liberia, Ivory Coast, and Ghana. It has gray/green flowers and orange fruits. It shows chemotaxonomic similarities with other members of Passifloraceae, supporting its classification, specifically production of Cyclopentenylglycines (2S,10R)-2-(20-cyclopentenyl)glycine.

Its twigs can be used topically as an insecticide or chewed for dental health.
