= Efulensia =

Scientific classification
- Kingdom: Plantae
- Clade: Tracheophytes
- Clade: Angiosperms
- Clade: Eudicots
- Clade: Rosids
- Order: Malpighiales
- Family: Passifloraceae
- Subfamily: Passifloroideae
- Tribe: Passifloreae
- Genus: Efulensia; C.H.Wright

Genus of plants

Efulensia is a genus of flowering plants belonging to the family Passifloraceae.

Its native range is Western Tropical Africa to Western Uganda.

Species:

- Efulensia clematoides C.H.Wright
- Efulensia montana W.J.de Wilde
