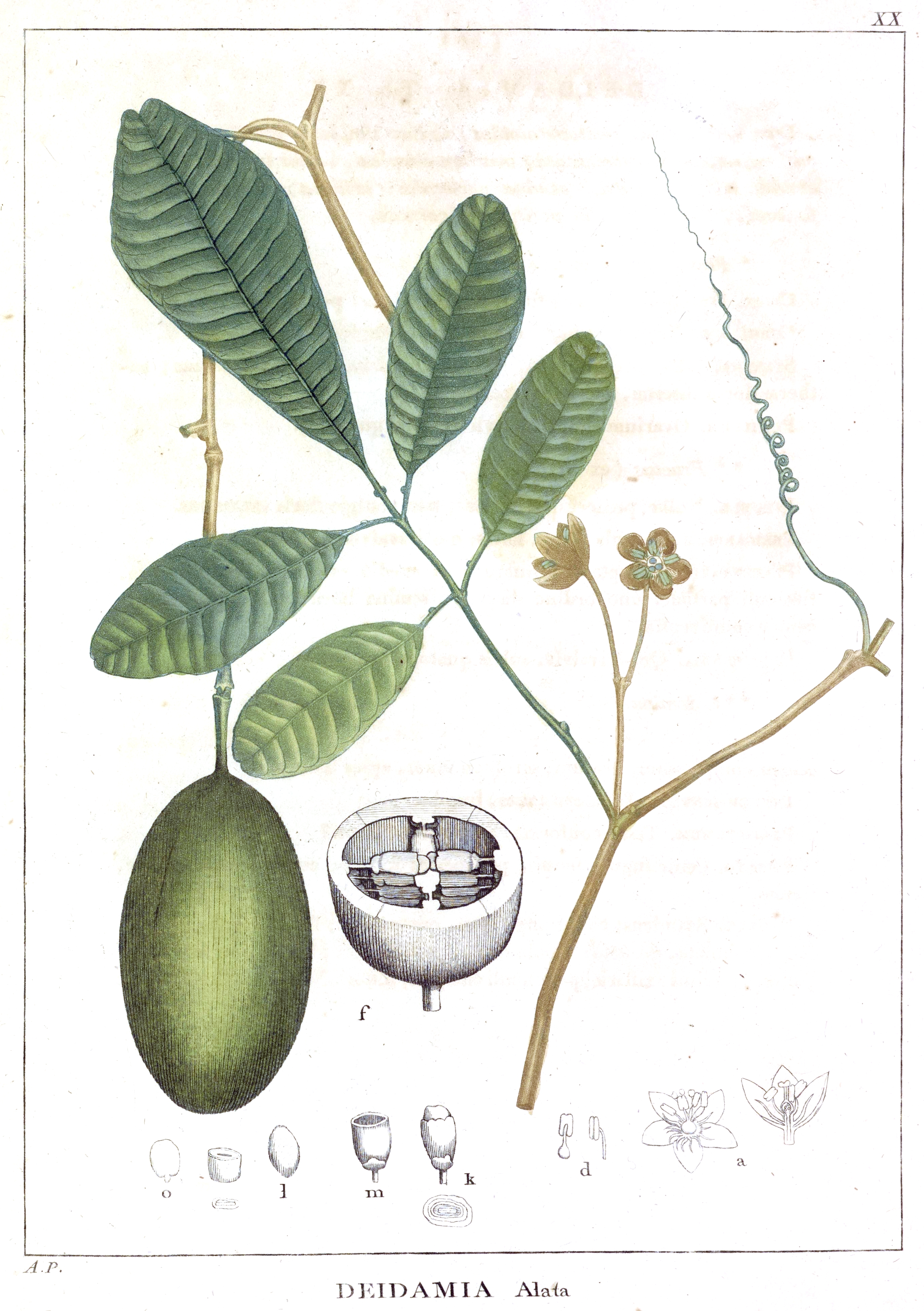
- Deidamia alata

Scientific classification
- Kingdom: Plantae
- Clade: Tracheophytes
- Clade: Angiosperms
- Clade: Eudicots
- Clade: Rosids
- Order: Malpighiales
- Family: Passifloraceae
- Genus: Deidamia; Noronha ex Thouars

Species
- Deidamia alata Thouars; Deidamia commersoniana DC.; Deidamia thompsoniana DC.
- Deidamia is native to the Comoros and Madagascar

Synonyms
- Octerium Salisb.; Thompsonia R.Br.

= Deidamia (plant) =

Genus of plants

Deidamia is a genus of flowering plants within the family Passifloraceae native to the Comoros and Madagascar.

== Taxonomy ==
=== Publication ===
The genus Deidamia Noronha ex Thouars was first named by Francisco Noronha, but only later validly published by Louis-Marie Aubert du Petit-Thouars in 1808.

=== Species ===
It includes three species:

- Deidamia alata Thouars
- Deidamia commersoniana DC.
- Deidamia thompsoniana DC.

== Distribution ==
It only occurs in the Comoros and Madagascar.
