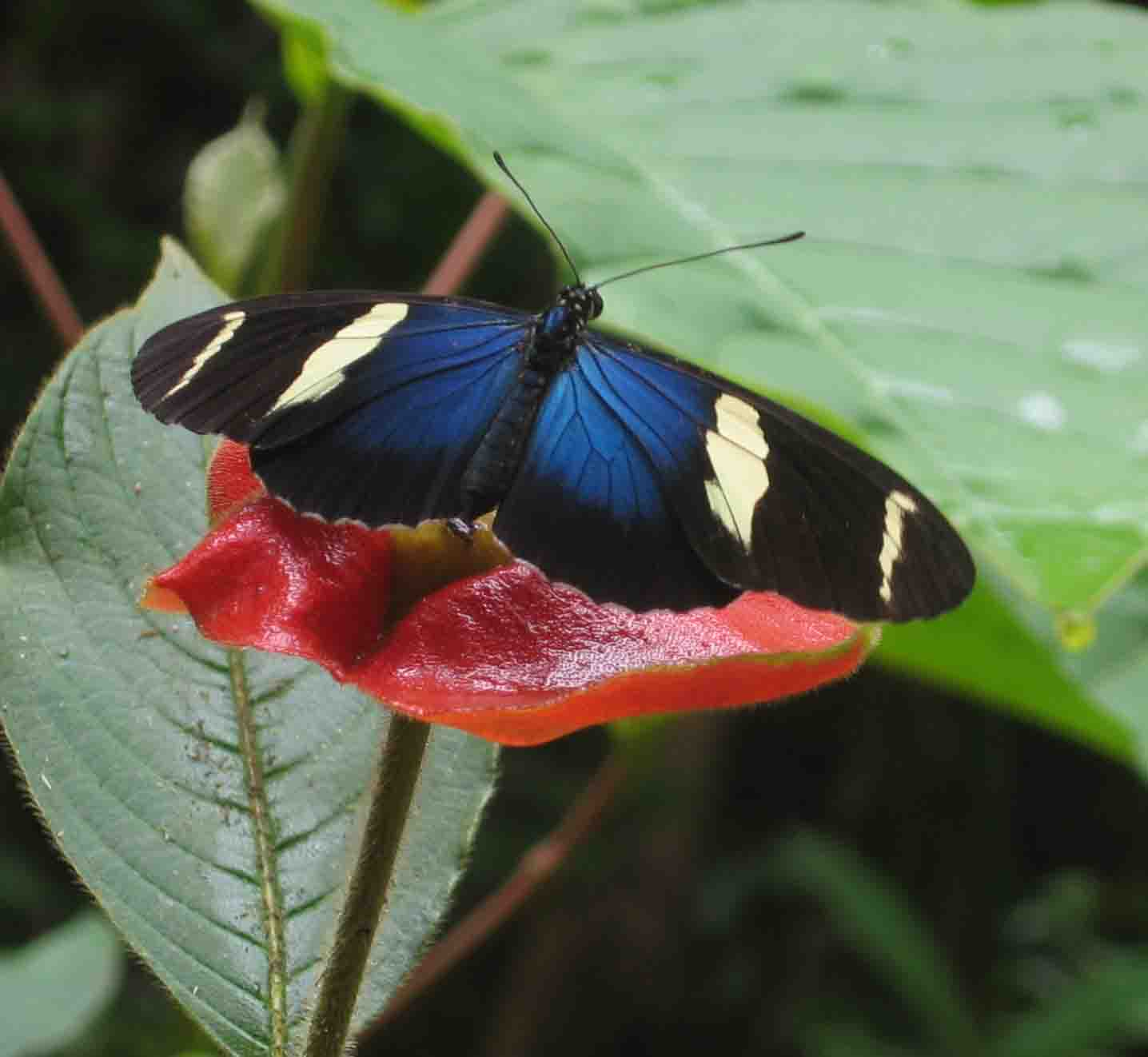
- topside
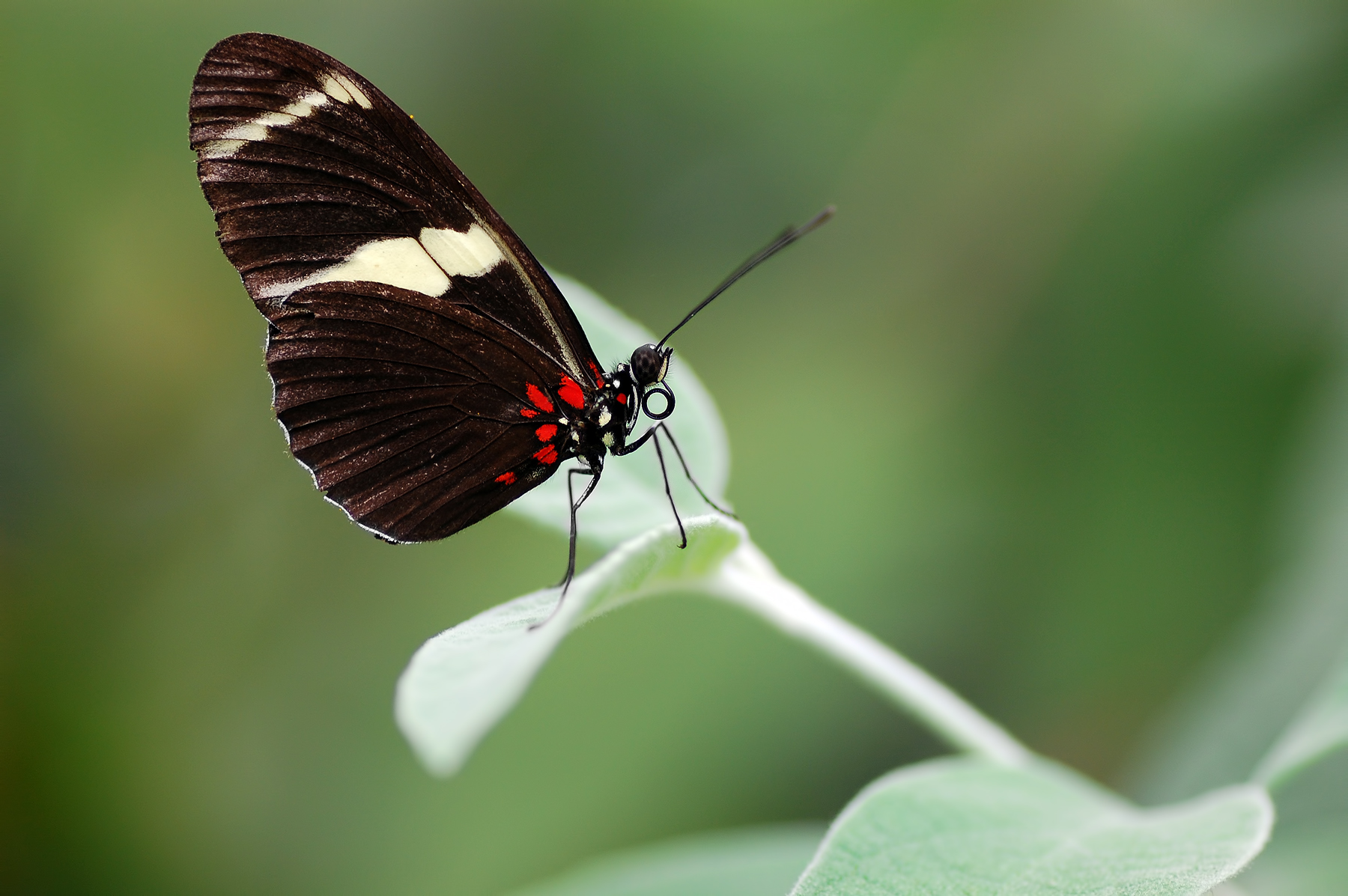
- underside

Scientific classification
- Domain: Eukaryota
- Kingdom: Animalia
- Phylum: Arthropoda
- Class: Insecta
- Order: Lepidoptera
- Family: Nymphalidae
- Genus: Heliconius
- Species: H. sara

Binomial name
- Heliconius sara (Fabricius, 1793)

= Sara longwing =

Species of butterfly

The Sara longwing (Heliconius sara) is a species of neotropical heliconiid butterfly found from Mexico to the Amazon Basin and southern Brazil. It is a colourful species: the dorsal wing surface is black with a large medial patch of metallic blue that is framed by two bands of white on the forewings. (This coloration is similar to that of Wallace's longwing, H. wallacei, whose range overlaps Sara's, but does not extend as far north.) The ventral wing surface is a dull brown to black with muted bands and small red spots on the proximal margin; total wingspan is 55–60 mm.

Inhabiting rainforests, adults are commonly found among sparser secondary growth and along forest margins. They feed on the nectar of Hamelia, Lantana, Palicourea, and Psiguria plants. They reproduce continuously, with several generations produced every year. Sara longwings are one of several heliconiids exhibiting the unusual practice of pupal mating, in which adult males are attracted to female pupae via the latter's pheromones. The males compete for prime perch space close to the females' chrysalids, and successful suitors forcibly mate with the females immediately following their emergence. Alternatively, males may also patrol a territory in which they search for females that have already emerged. The adult stage has a lifespan of 2–3 months.

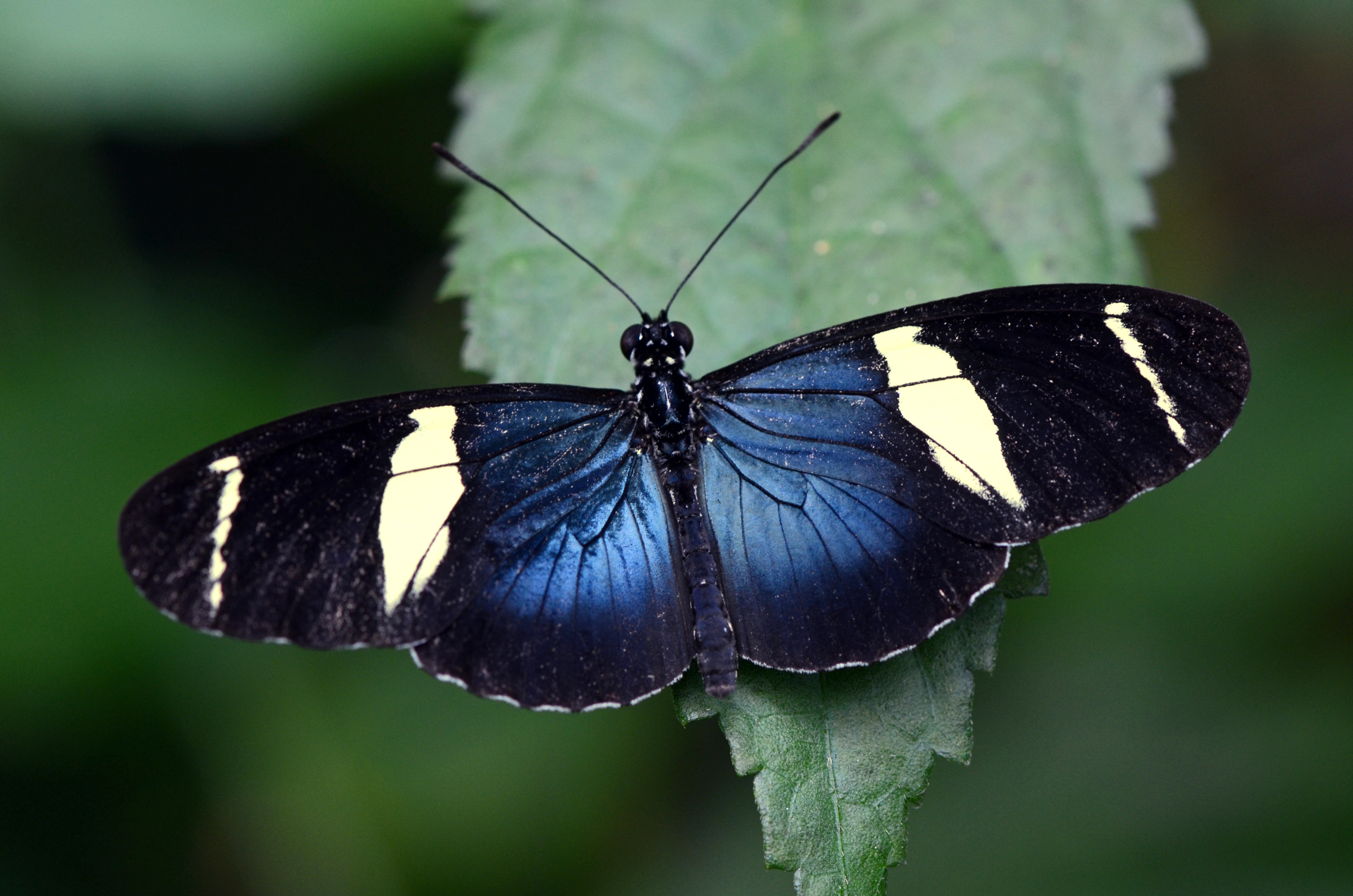

Like other heliconiids, females seek the new growth of passion flower vines to lay their small yellow eggs, in clusters of 10–50. The vines contain toxic compounds that the caterpillars are immune to; as they feed upon the vines, the caterpillars concentrate the toxins within their tissues. After pupating (with the chrysalis also found on the host vine and camouflaged like a leaf), the adult retains the toxins and is thus protected from predation.

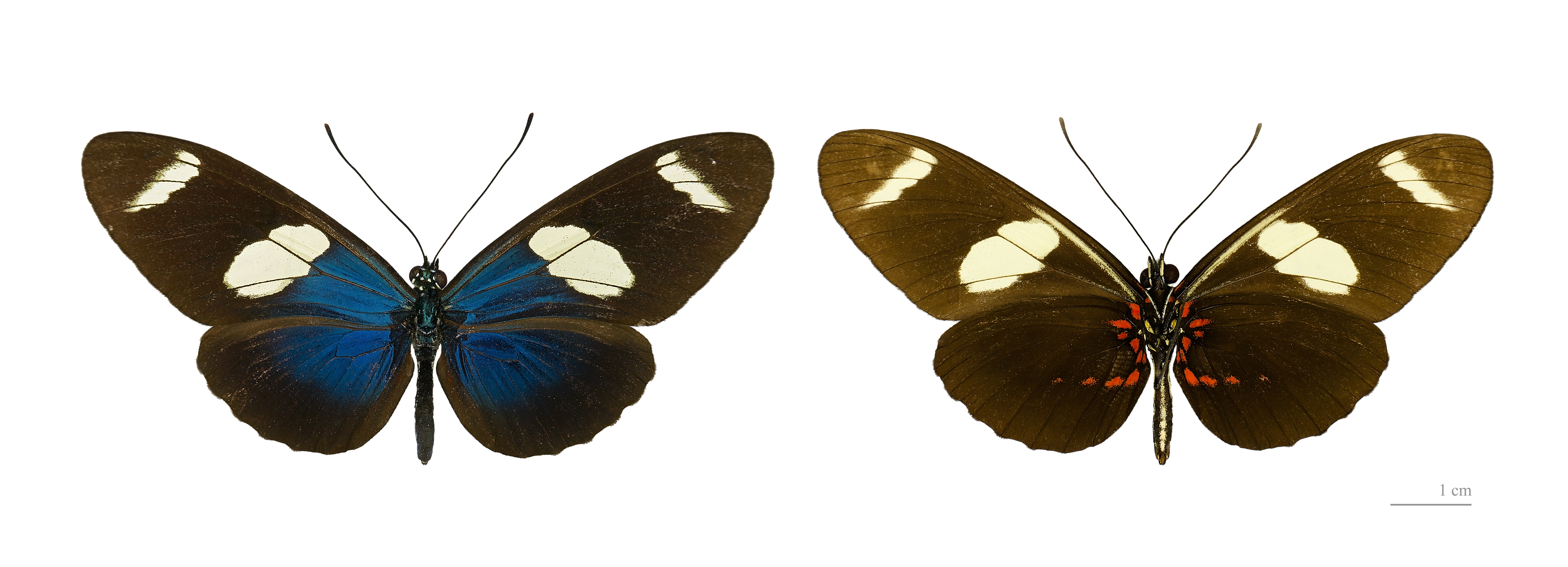
Heliconius sara dorsal and ventral sides
