= Hyalocalyx =

Scientific classification
- Kingdom: Plantae
- Clade: Tracheophytes
- Clade: Angiosperms
- Clade: Eudicots
- Clade: Rosids
- Order: Malpighiales
- Family: Passifloraceae
- Subfamily: Turneroideae
- Genus: Hyalocalyx; Rolfe
- Species: H. setifer

Binomial name
- Hyalocalyx setifer Rolfe
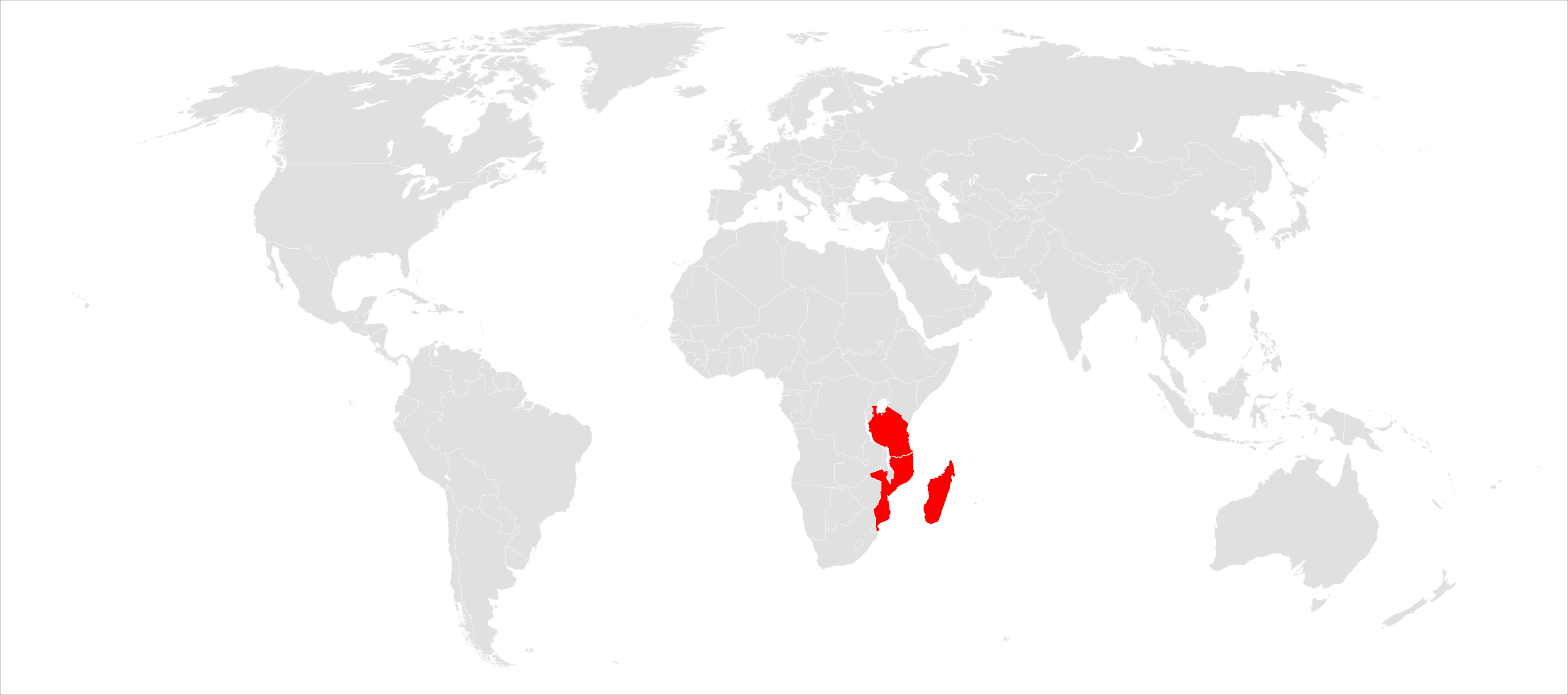

Synonyms
- Turnera stifera (Rolfe) Baill.; Hyalcalyx dalleizettii Capit.

Genus of plants

Hyalocalyx setifer is the sole member of the monotypic genus Hyalocalyx.

== Description ==
Hyalocalyx setifer is an annual herb.

=== Morphology ===
H setifer can grow up to 27 cm tall. It has a brown woody stem that is covered in long yellowish hairs.

==== Flower morphology ====
H. setifer exhibits both distylous and homostylous flowers. Its flowers are solitary, cylindrical, 5–6 mm long, and range from pale yellow to orange in color.

== Distribution ==
Its native range is Tanzania, Mozambique and Madagascar. It is found in open woodlands, along roadsides and on cultivated lands. It is primarily found in dry sandy soil.
