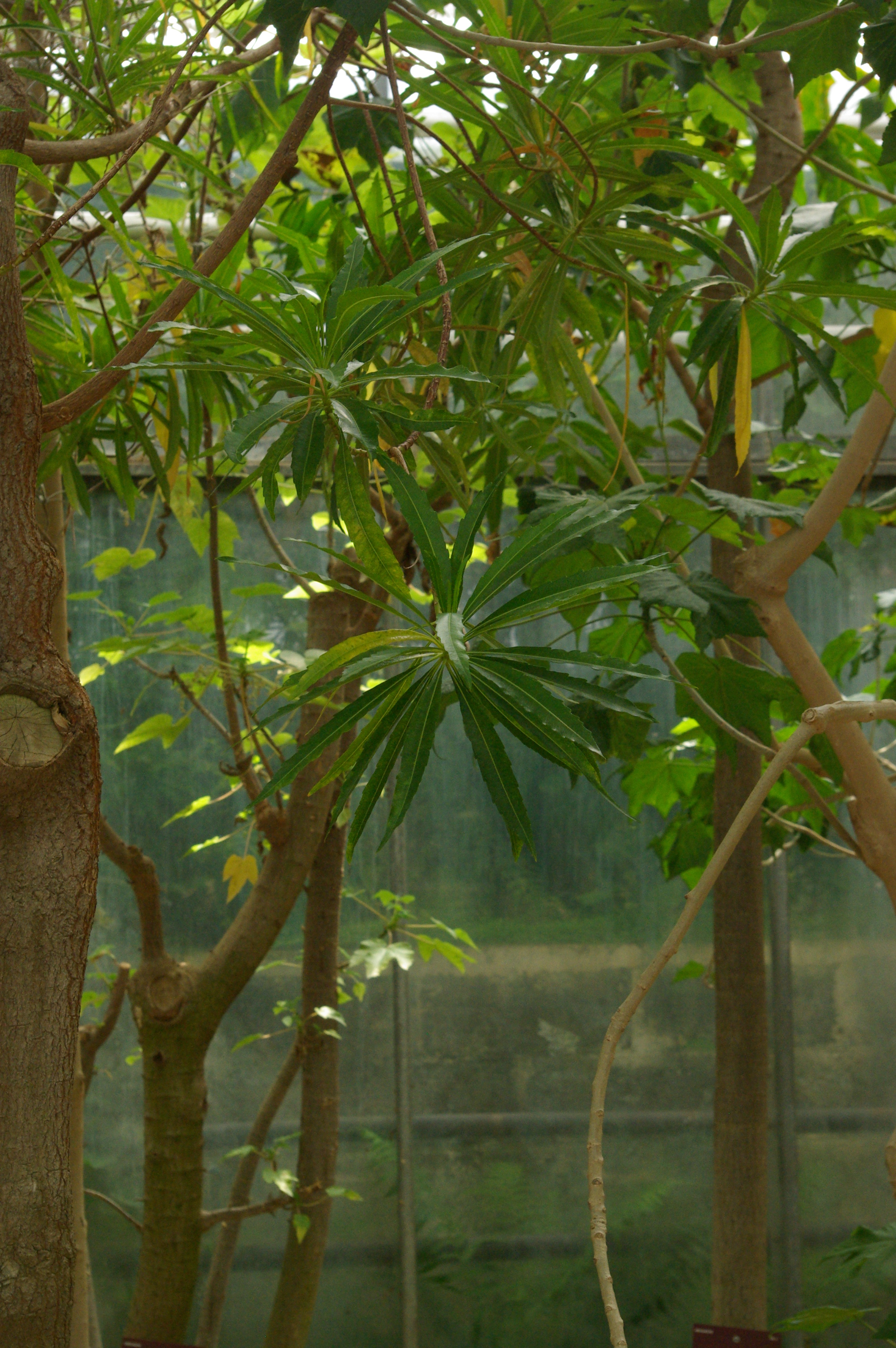

Scientific classification
- Kingdom: Plantae
- Clade: Tracheophytes
- Clade: Angiosperms
- Clade: Eudicots
- Clade: Rosids
- Order: Malpighiales
- Family: Passifloraceae
- Subfamily: Turneroideae
- Genus: Mathurina; Balf.f.
- Species: M. penduliflora

Binomial name
- Mathurina penduliflora Balf.f.

= Mathurina =

Genus of plants

Mathurina penduliflora is the sole member of the monotypic genus Mathurina, of flowering plants.

== Description ==
Mathurina penduliflora is a tree native to the Rodrigues Island.

=== Morphology ===
It grows 4 - 12 meters tall, young leaves are linear, mature leaves are obovate, and it has white hairless homostylous flowers. Heterophylly has been recorded in the genus.

== Taxonomy ==
Isolation of tetraphyllin B and volkenin from M. penduliflora support its classification as a member of Turneroideae.

== Distribution ==
M. penduliflora is only found on the Rodrigues Island.

== Conservation status ==
As of 2024, M. penduliflora has not been given a conservation status.

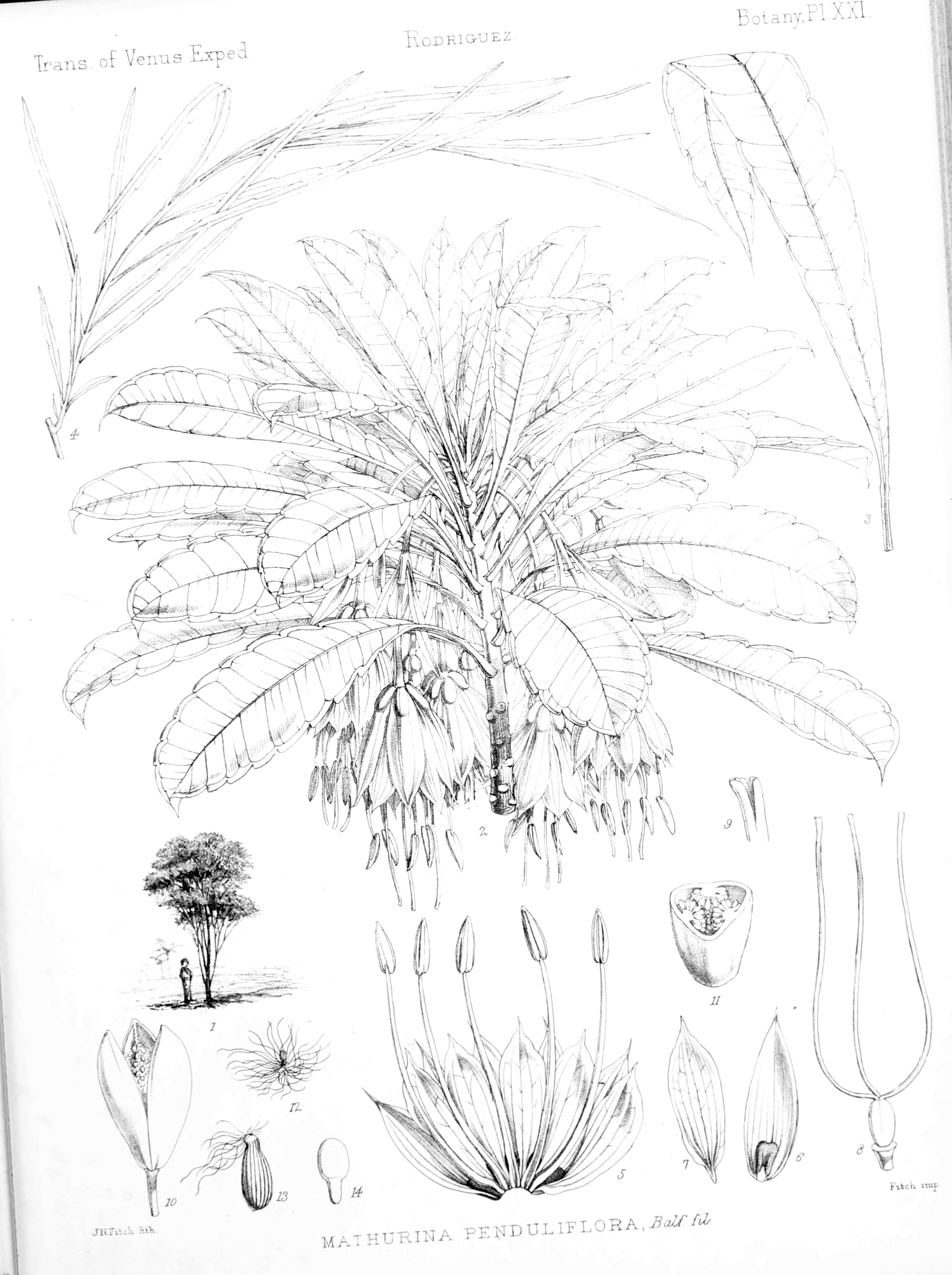
1879 diagram of M. penduliflora
