= Mitostemma =

Scientific classification
- Kingdom: Plantae
- Clade: Tracheophytes
- Clade: Angiosperms
- Clade: Eudicots
- Clade: Rosids
- Order: Malpighiales
- Family: Passifloraceae
- Subfamily: Passifloroideae
- Tribe: Passifloreae
- Genus: Mitostemma; Mast.

Genus of plants

Mitostemma is a genus of flowering plants belonging to the family Passifloraceae.

Its native range is Guyana to Brazil.

== Species ==
Species:

- Mitostemma brevifilis Gontsch.
- Mitostemma glaziovii Mast.
- Mitostemma jenmanii Mast.
