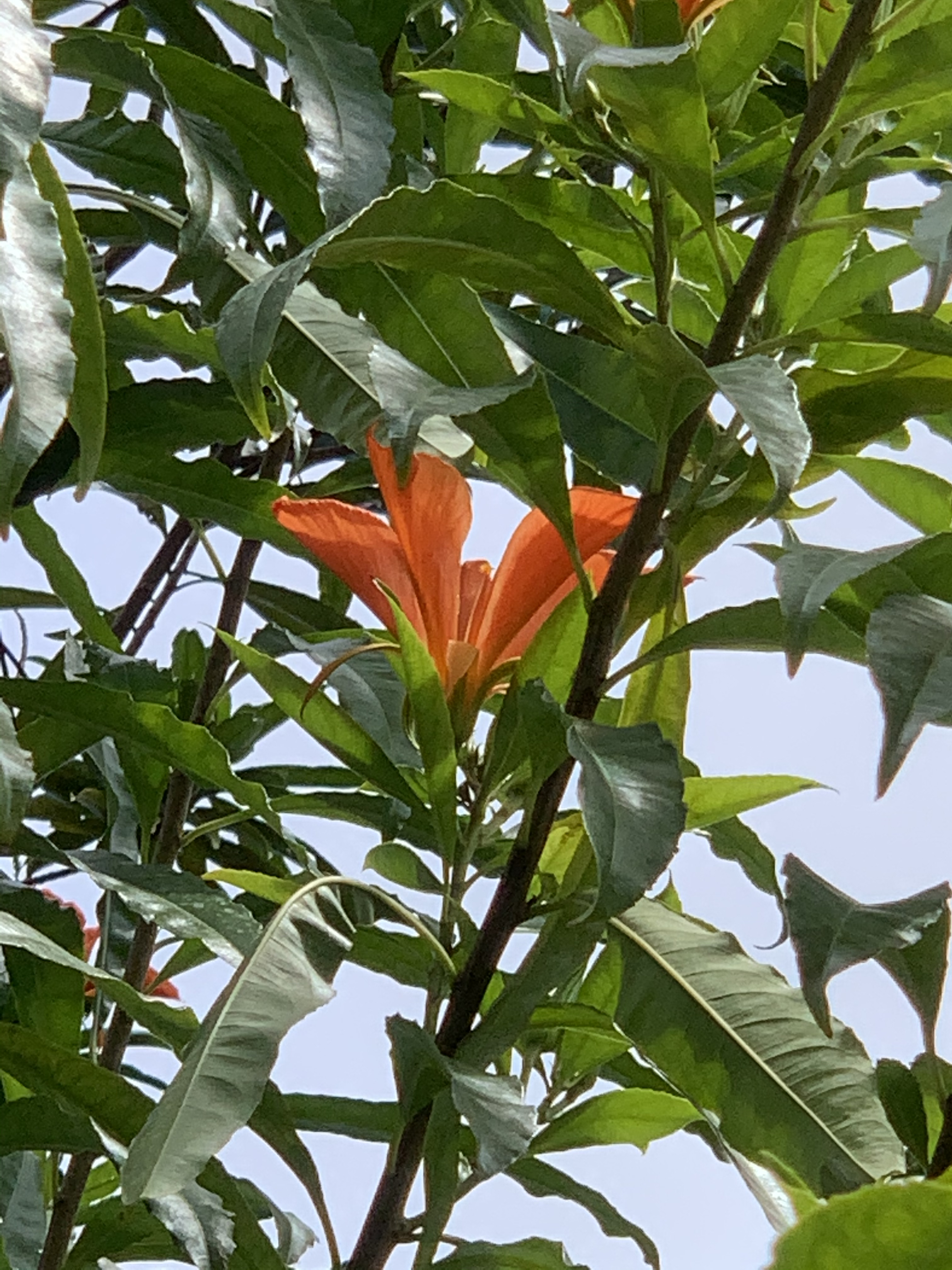
- Flowers of Erblichia odorata

Conservation status
- Least Concern (IUCN 3.1)

Scientific classification
- Kingdom: Plantae
- Clade: Tracheophytes
- Clade: Angiosperms
- Clade: Eudicots
- Clade: Rosids
- Order: Malpighiales
- Family: Passifloraceae
- Subfamily: Turneroideae
- Genus: Erblichia; Seem.
- Species: E. odorata

Binomial name
- Erblichia odorata Seem.
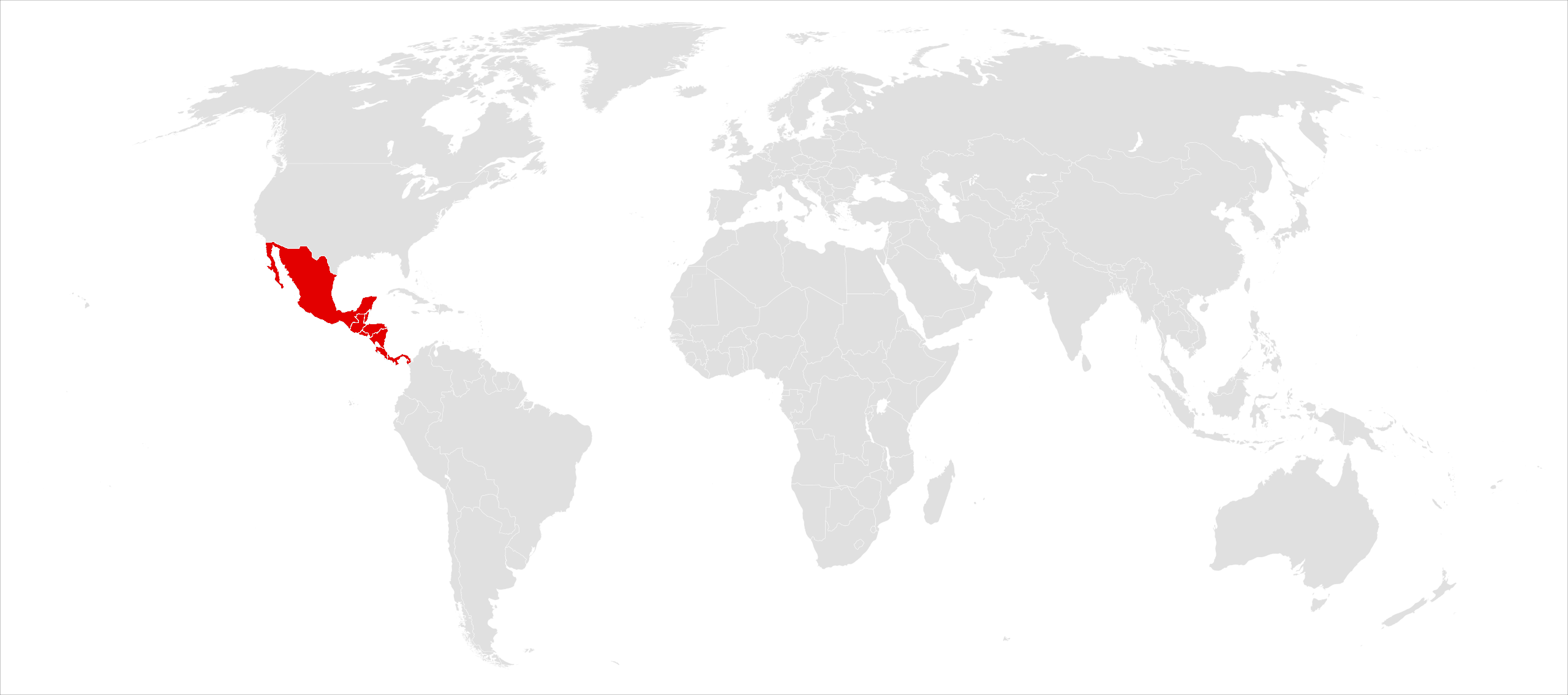

Synonyms
- Erblichia odorata var. mollis (Standl. & Steyerm.) L.O.Williams; Erblichia standleyi Steyerm.; Erblichia xylocarpa (Sprague & L.Riley) Standl. & Steyerm.; Erblichia xylocarpa var. mollis Standl. & Steyerm.; Piriqueta odorata (Seem.) Urb.; Piriqueta xylocarpa Sprague & L.Riley

= Erblichia =

Butterfly Tree

Genus of plants

Erblichia odorata is the sole member of the monotypic genus Erblichia. It is colloquially known as Butterfly tree or Flor de Mayo.

== Description ==
=== Morphology ===
E. odorata is a large tree that can reach heights of 40 meters.

==== Floral morphology ====
Flowers are orange, solitary and range from 6 - 11.5 cm long. Unlike other genera of Turneroideae which exhibit distyly, E. odorata does not.

== Taxonomy ==
The genus was named in honour of Ch. Erblich, a German court garden-master in Hannover. It was first described and published in Bot. Voy. Herald in 1854.

Although the genera was originally composed of five species, these are currently classified as heterotypic synonyms.

== Distribution ==
Its native range is Mexico to Central America. It is found in the countries of Belize, Costa Rica, El Salvador, Guatemala, Honduras, Mexico, Nicaragua and Panama.

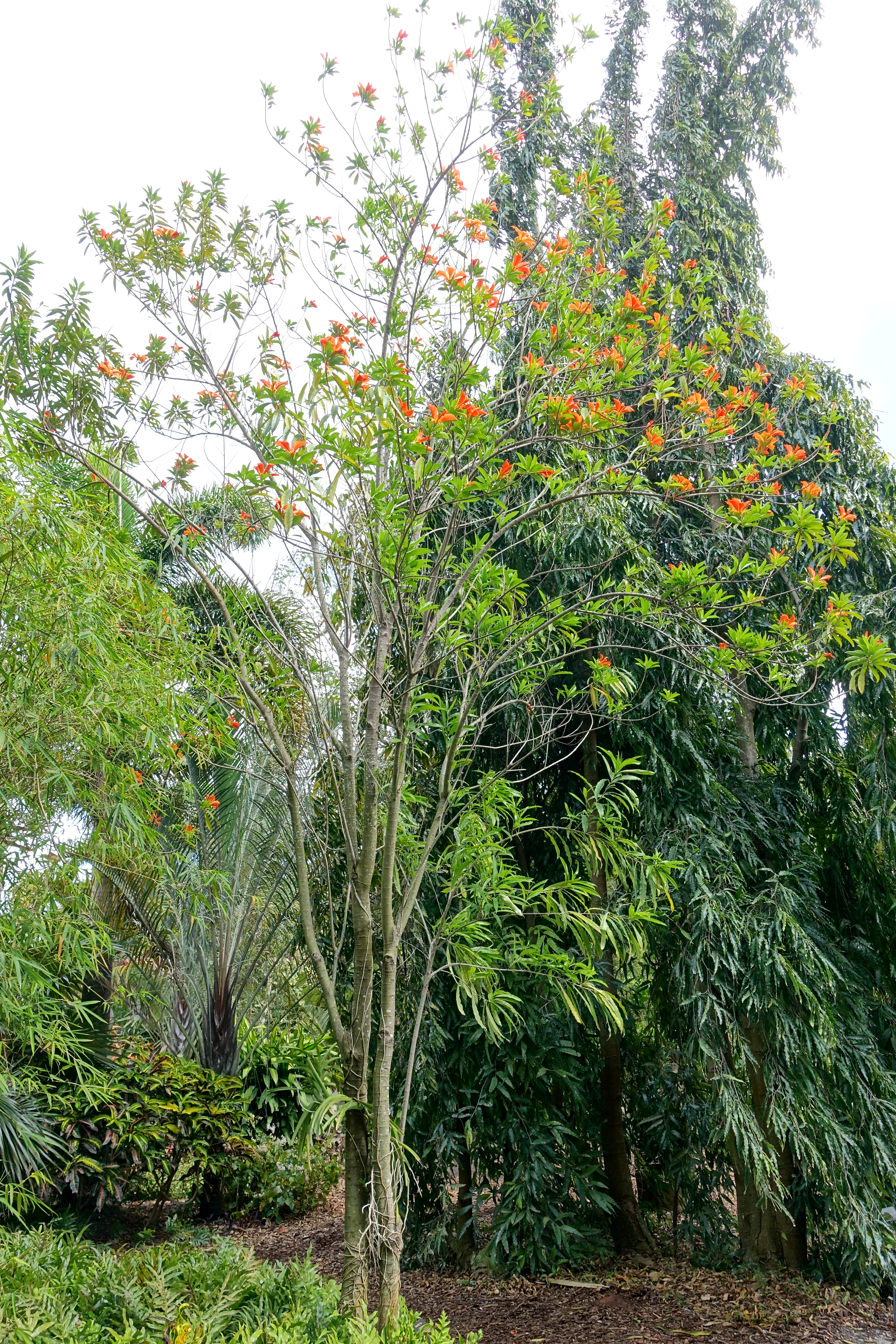
Image of Erblichia odorata

== Conservation status ==
As of 2019, E. odorata is classified as least concern and does not have any listed known threats.
