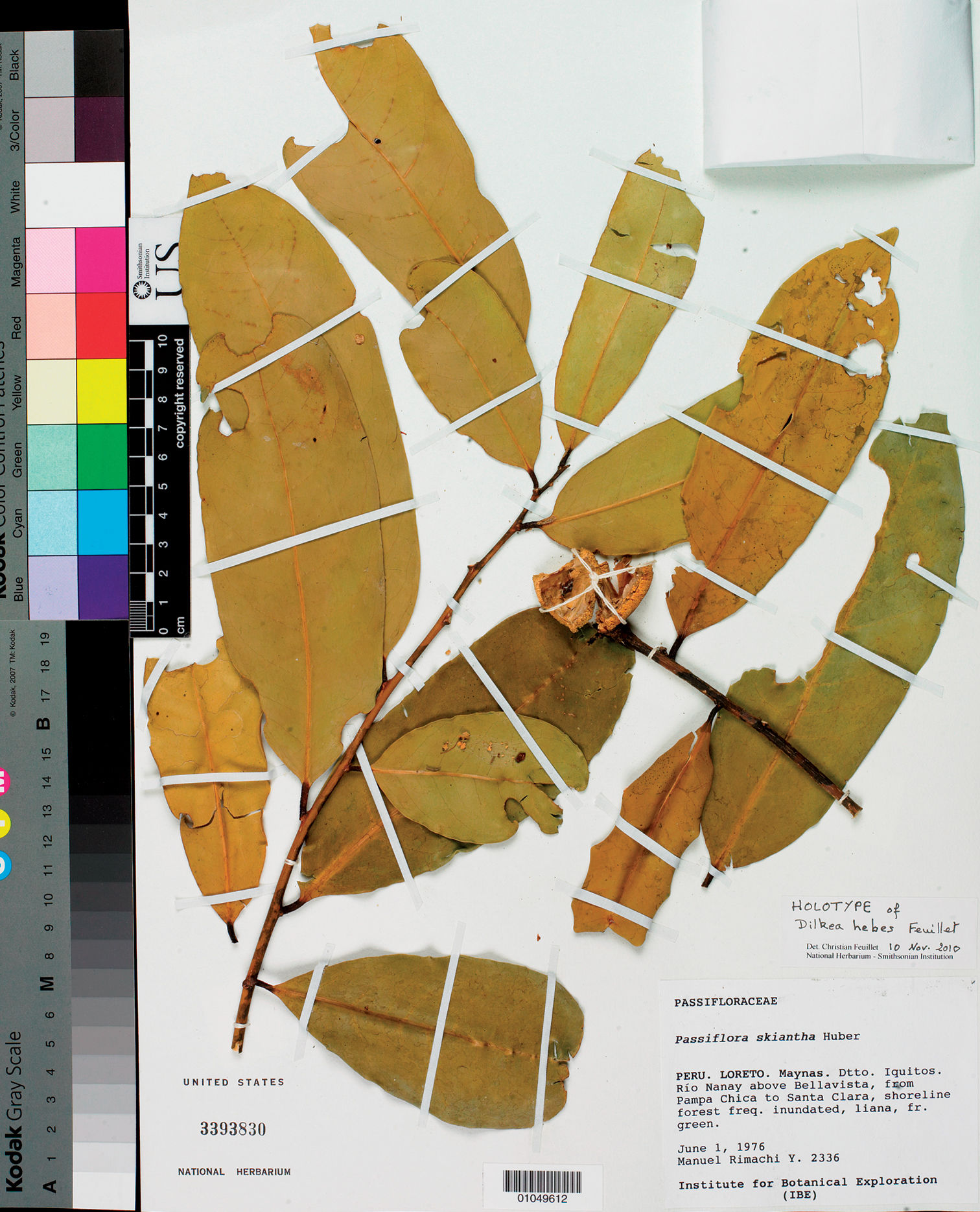
- Dilkea hebes

Scientific classification
- Kingdom: Plantae
- Clade: Embryophytes
- Clade: Tracheophytes
- Clade: Spermatophytes
- Clade: Angiosperms
- Clade: Eudicots
- Clade: Rosids
- Order: Malpighiales
- Family: Passifloraceae
- Subfamily: Passifloroideae
- Tribe: Passifloreae
- Genus: Dilkea; Mast.

= Dilkea =

Genus of plants

Dilkea is a genus of flowering plants belonging to the family Passifloraceae.

== Distribution ==
Its native range is Southern Tropical America.

== Etymology ==
The genus name of Dilkea is in honour of Sir Charles Wentworth Dilke, 1st Baronet (1810–1869), an English politician. It was published by Maxwell T. Masters in Trans. Linn. Soc. London Vol.27 on page 627 in 1871, after Dilke's death.

== Taxonomy ==
=== Species ===
Known species:

- Dilkea acuminata Mast.
- Dilkea clarkei Feuillet
- Dilkea cuneata Feuillet
- Dilkea exilis Feuillet
- Dilkea granvillei Feuillet
- Dilkea hebes Feuillet
- Dilkea lecta Feuillet
- Dilkea margaritae Cervi
- Dilkea nitens Feuillet
- Dilkea ovalis Feuillet
- Dilkea retusa Mast.
- Dilkea tillettii Feuillet
- Dilkea vanessae Feuillet
