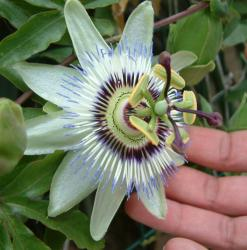
- Passiflora caerulea

Scientific classification
- Kingdom: Plantae
- Clade: Embryophytes
- Clade: Tracheophytes
- Clade: Angiosperms
- Clade: Eudicots
- Clade: Rosids
- Order: Malpighiales
- Family: Passifloraceae; Juss. ex Roussel

Subfamilies
- Malesherbioideae; Pibirioideae; Passifloroideae; Turneroideae

Synonyms
- Malesherbiaceae D.Don, nom. cons.; Modeccaceae Horan.; Paropsiaceae Dumort.; Turneraceae Kunth ex DC., nom. cons.

= Passifloraceae =

Family of flowering plants

The Passifloraceae are a family of flowering plants, containing about 750 species classified in around 27 genera. They include trees, shrubs, lianas, and climbing plants, and are mostly found in tropical regions. The family takes its name from the passion flower genus (Passiflora) which includes the edible passion fruit (Passiflora edulis), as well as plants such as maypop and running pop used by gardeners.

Passiflora vines and Dryas iulia (among other heliconian butterflies) have demonstrated evidence of coevolution, in which the plants attempted to stop their destruction from larval feeding by the butterflies, while the butterflies tried to gain better survival for their eggs.

The former Cronquist system of classification placed this family in the order Violales, but under more modern classifications systems such as that proposed by the Angiosperm Phylogeny Group, this is absorbed into the Malpighiales and the family has been expanded to include the former Malesherbiaceae and Turneraceae.

== Genera ==
=== Subfamily Malesherbioideae ===
- Malesherbia Ruiz & Pav.

=== Subfamily Pibirioideae ===
- Pibiria Maas

=== Subfamily Passifloroideae ===
Tribe Paropsieae

- Androsiphonia Stapf
- Barteria Hook.f. (includes synonym Smeathmannia Sol. ex R.Br.)
- Paropsia Noronha ex Thouars
- Paropsiopsis Engl.
- Viridivia J.H.Hemsl. & Verdc.

Tribe Jongkindieae Breteler & F.T.Bakker

- Jongkindia Breteler & F.T.Bakker

Tribe Passifloreae

- Adenia Forssk.
- Ancistrothyrsus Harms
- Basananthe Peyr.
- Crossostemma Planch. ex Benth.
- Deidamia Noronha ex Thouars
- Dilkea Mast.
- Efulensia C.H.Wright
- Mitostemma Mast.
- Passiflora L.
- Schlechterina Harms

=== Subfamily Turneroideae ===
- Adenoa Arbo
- Afroqueta Thulin & Razafim
- Arboa Thulin & Razafim
- Erblichia Seem.
- Hyalocalyx Rolfe
- Loewia Urb.
- Mathurina Balf.f.
- Oxossia L. Rocha
- Piriqueta Aubl.
- Stapfiella Gilg
- Streptopetalum Hochst.
- Tricliceras Thonn. ex DC.
- Turnera L.

=== Excluded genera ===
- Abatia Ruiz & Pav. → Salicaceae
- Aphaerema Miers → Salicaceae

== Phylogeny ==
- Outgroup
  Violaceae
- - Malesherbioideae
  - - - Pibirioideae
      - Turneroideae
    - Passifloroideae
