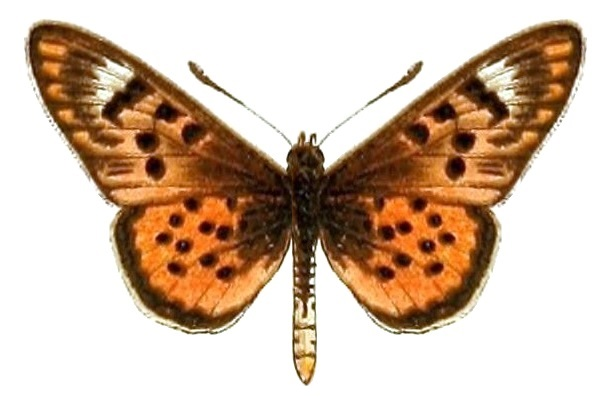
- A. doubledayi in Seitz (1925)

Scientific classification
- Kingdom: Animalia
- Phylum: Arthropoda
- Class: Insecta
- Order: Lepidoptera
- Family: Nymphalidae
- Genus: Acraea
- Species: A. doubledayi

Binomial name
- Acraea doubledayi Guérin-Méneville, 1849

Synonyms
- Acraea (Acraea) doubledayi; Acraea gaekwari Sharpe, 1901; Acraea doubledayi f. rileyi Eltringham, 1913; Acraea doubledayi arabica Eltringham, 1912

= Acraea doubledayi =

Species of butterfly

Acraea doubledayi is a butterfly in the family Nymphalidae. It is found in Sudan, Uganda, Ethiopia, Somalia, Saudi Arabia and Yemen.

== Description ==
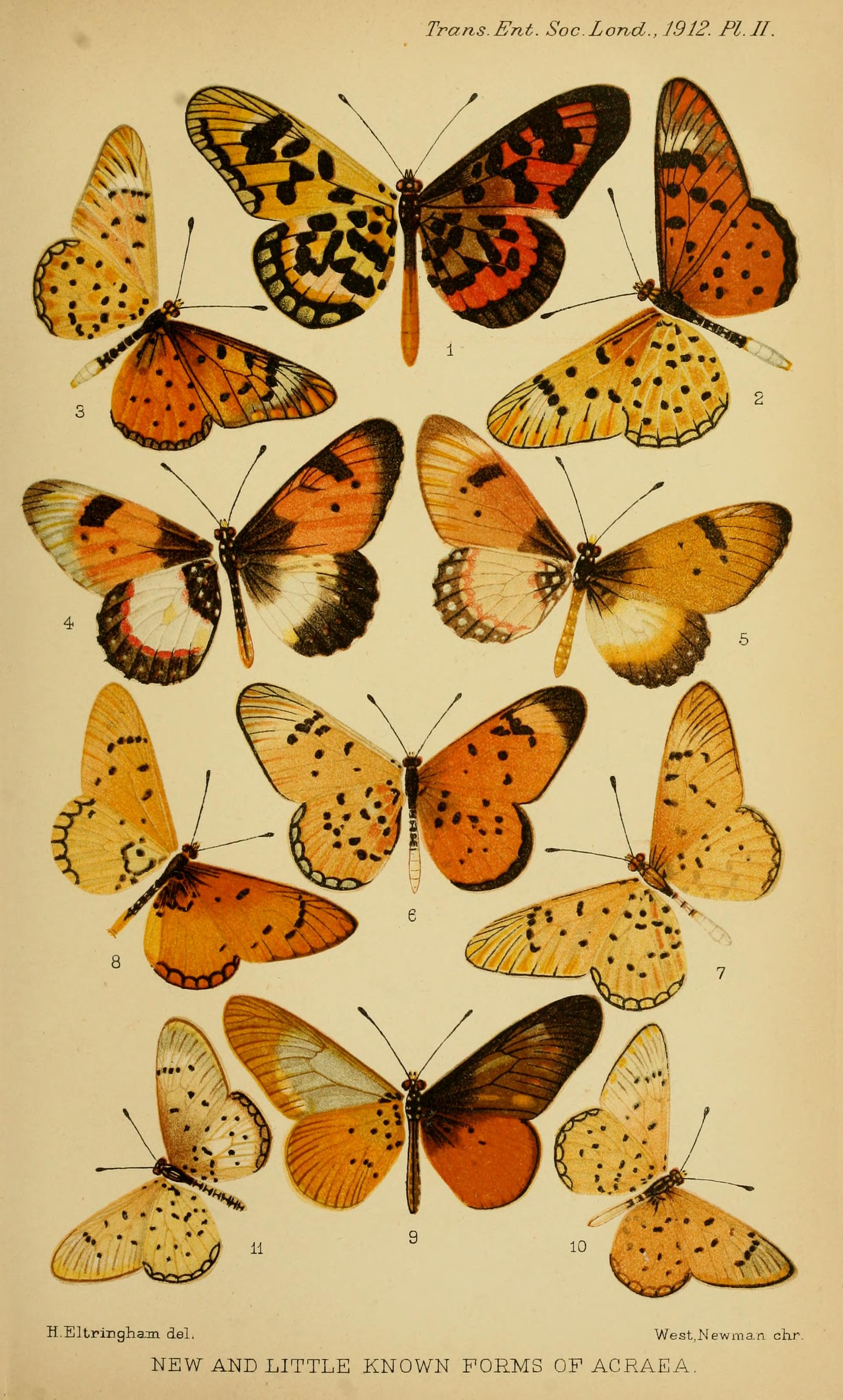
Figures 1 and 2

A. doubledayi Guer. (= gaekwari E. Sharpe) (55 e) may be easily known by the shape of the marginal band of the hindwing, the red-brown ground-colour of the upper surface and the strongly developed black markings, as well as by the small light or transparent spots in 4 to 6 of the fore wing behind the discal dots; under surface of the hindwing reddish yellow with large whitish marginal spots. In the type-form the forewing above has a broad black marginal band, which is formed by the union of the black submarginal streaks with the veins and the marginal line, reaches the light subapical band and encloses yellow marginal spots; both wings above darkened at the base. Abyssinia and Somaliland. - female ab. candida Eltr. [ female f. of Acraea sykesi] differs in the white ground-colour of both wings. Niam-Niam. - arabica Eltr. has the wings more densely scaled with whitish, but not transparent, subapical band on the forewing; the wings above not or scarcely darkened at the base. Arabia. sykesi E. Sharpe has the ground-colour on the upper surface lighter, on the forewing only separated by a black line from the distal margin; the broad black marginal band is consequently entirely absent and the black submarginal streaks in cellules 2 to 5 are placed free in the ground-colour; the light subapical band of the forewing is indistinct or entirely absent. German and British East Africa; Uganda and Soudan.

== Subspecies ==
- Acraea doubledayi doubledayi (south-eastern Sudan, northern Uganda, Ethiopia, Somalia)
- Acraea doubledayi azvaki d'Abrera, 1980 (south-western Saudi Arabia, Yemen)

== Biology ==
The larvae feed on Adenia species.

== Taxonomy ==
It is a member of the Acraea caecilia species group. See also Pierre & Bernaud, 2014.

== Etymology ==
The name honours Edward Doubleday
