= Acraea sykesi =

Sykes' acraea

Scientific classification
- Kingdom: Animalia
- Phylum: Arthropoda
- Class: Insecta
- Order: Lepidoptera
- Family: Nymphalidae
- Genus: Acraea
- Species: A. sykesi

Binomial name
- Acraea sykesi Sharpe, 1902

Synonyms
- Acraea (Acraea) sykesi; Acraea skyesi; Acraea doubledayi f. candida Eltringham, 1912

Species of butterfly

Acraea sykesi, the Sykes' acraea, is a butterfly in the family Nymphalidae. It is found in northern Nigeria, northern Cameroon, the Central African Republic, the north-eastern part of the Democratic Republic of the Congo, south-eastern Sudan, northern Uganda, north-western Kenya and possibly north-western Tanzania.

== Description ==
Very similar to Acraea doubledayi qv.

== Biology ==
The habitat consists of dry riverbeds and savanna.

The larvae feed on Adenia species, including A. venenata.

== Taxonomy ==
It is a member of the Acraea caecilia species group. See also Pierre & Bernaud, 2014.
