= Elephant's foot =

Elephant's foot may refer to:

== Plants ==
- Adenia pechuelii, in the family Passifloraceae; endemic to Namibia
- Amorphophallus paeoniifolius, also known as "elephant foot yam"
- Beaucarnea recurvata (also called ponytail palm), in the family Asparagaceae; native to eastern Mexico
- Dioscorea elephantipes, (also called Hottentot bread; syn. Testudinaria elephantipes), in the family Dioscoreaceae, native to South Africa
- Elephantopus, in the daisy family; widespread over much of Africa, southern Asia, Australia, and the Americas
- Portulacaria afra, also known as "Elephant's food"

== Other uses ==
- The lower section of an Elephant's leg, which has an irregular profile, and 5 toes
- A geometrical design typical of Turkmen rugs
- Elephant's Foot (Chernobyl), a formation of corium at the Chernobyl reactor site
- A half length sleeping bag; See bivvy bag
- A type of step stool with concealed spring-loaded castors allowing the step to be easily moved
