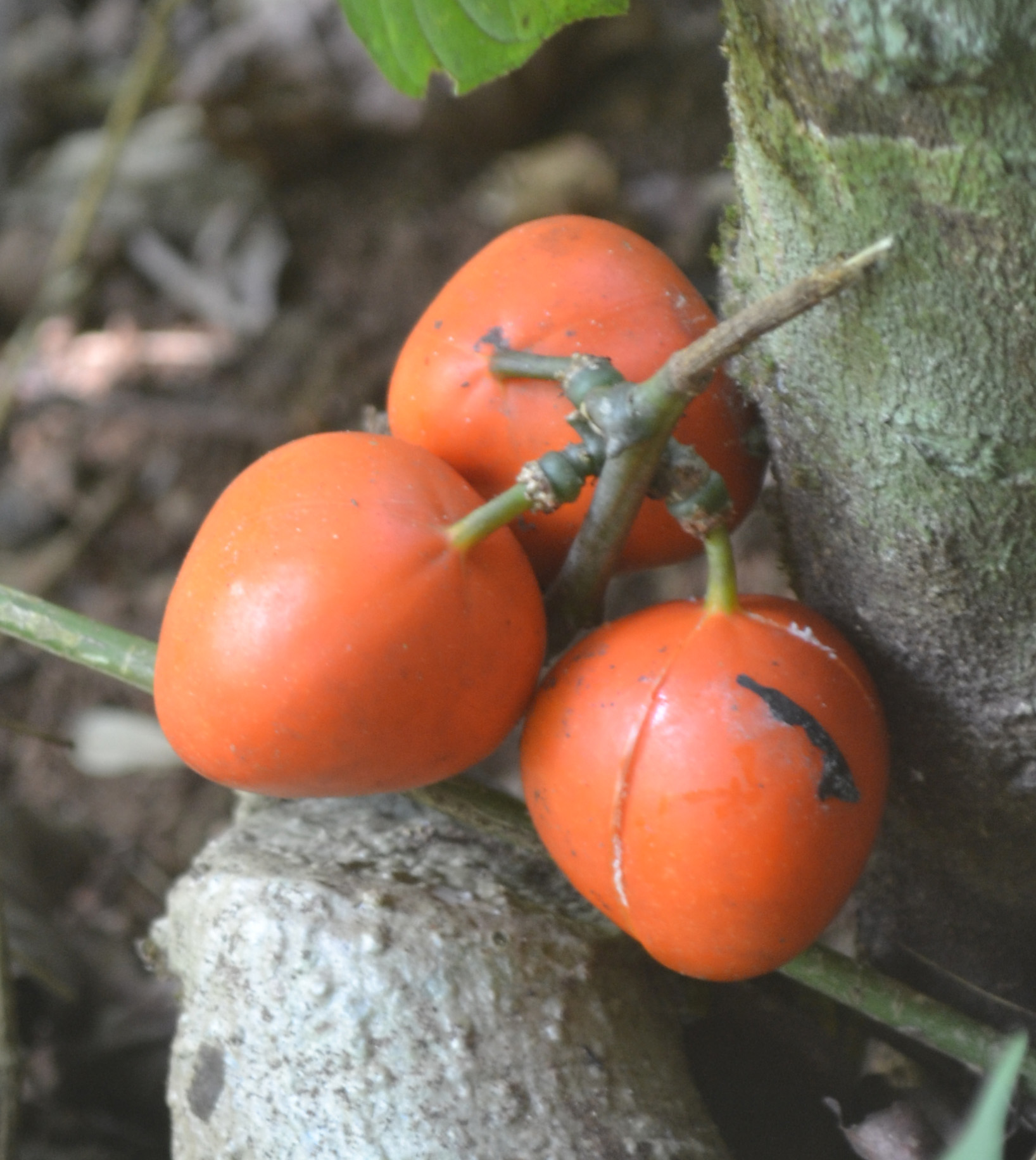
- Fruits

Scientific classification
- Kingdom: Plantae
- Clade: Tracheophytes
- Clade: Angiosperms
- Clade: Eudicots
- Clade: Rosids
- Order: Malpighiales
- Family: Passifloraceae
- Genus: Adenia
- Species: A. hondala

Binomial name
- Adenia hondala (Gaertn.) W.J.de Wilde, 1968)

Synonyms
- Adenia palmata Engl.; Granadilla hondala Gaertn.; Modecca palmata Lam.

= Adenia hondala =

Species of plant

Adenia hondala, commonly known as hondala is a large, tuberous, woody climber which scrambles over other plants. It is found in the Indian subcontinent, including Sri Lanka, and in southeastern Asia. The tuber and the fruit are used as herbal remedies and the plant is used as a cure for snake bites. The caterpillars of several species of butterfly feed on this plant; these include the tawny coster, the clipper, the common cruiser and the Tamil lacewing.

== Description ==
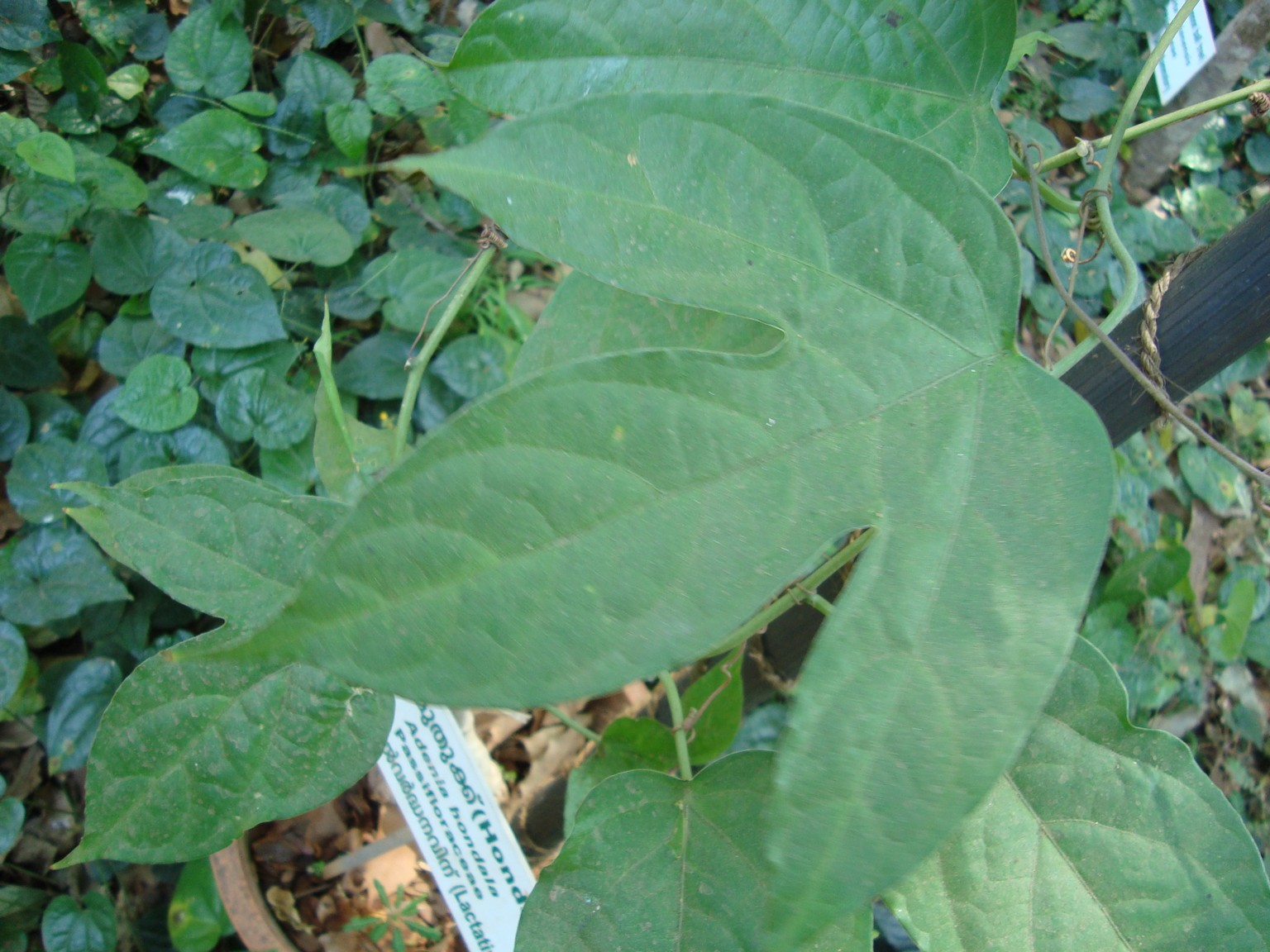
From Thrissur, Kerala

Adenia hondala is a climbing plant growing from a large irregular-shaped tuber. The woody, scrambling stems are thickened at the nodes. The leaves are alternate, with a tendril growing from each node, and these tendrils bear the flowers. The leaves are large and are deeply, palmately divided into three to five lobes; they have circular glands between the lobes. The flowers are greenish-white or bluish-white, each with a bell-shaped tube and five curled-back petals. The fruit is a capsule splitting into three valves with stiff rind and filled with seeds surrounded by fleshy white arils. The fruit is globular, green at first, turning orange as it ripens, and is poisonous. The fruits are poisonous and their resemblance to the fruits of the passion flower has led children to eat it mistakenly.

== Distribution ==
This plant is native to tropical southeastern Asia, Vietmam and the southwestern part of India and Sri Lanka.

== Ecology ==
The caterpillars of the tawny coster (Acraea terpsicore), the Tamil lacewing (Cethosia nietneri), the common cruiser (Vindula erota) and the clipper (Parthenos sylvia) feed on this plant.

== Uses ==
The young shoots and leaf stalks can be cooked and eaten. The tubers, which are poisonous, have antibacterial and antimicrobial properties and are used in Ayurvedic medicine for the treatment of skin disorders and to treat hernias. The seeds are used to combat the effects of poison, and the tubers are used to make a drug known as "vidari" or "vidaari", although this pharmaceutical is also made from other plants, Ipomoea mauritiana, Pueraria tuberosa and Cycas circinalis. The plant is also used against snake bites.

== Status ==
Adenia hondala is a generally uncommon species. In Tamil Nadu its conservation status is listed as being near threatened while in Kerala and Karnataka it is listed as being vulnerable.
