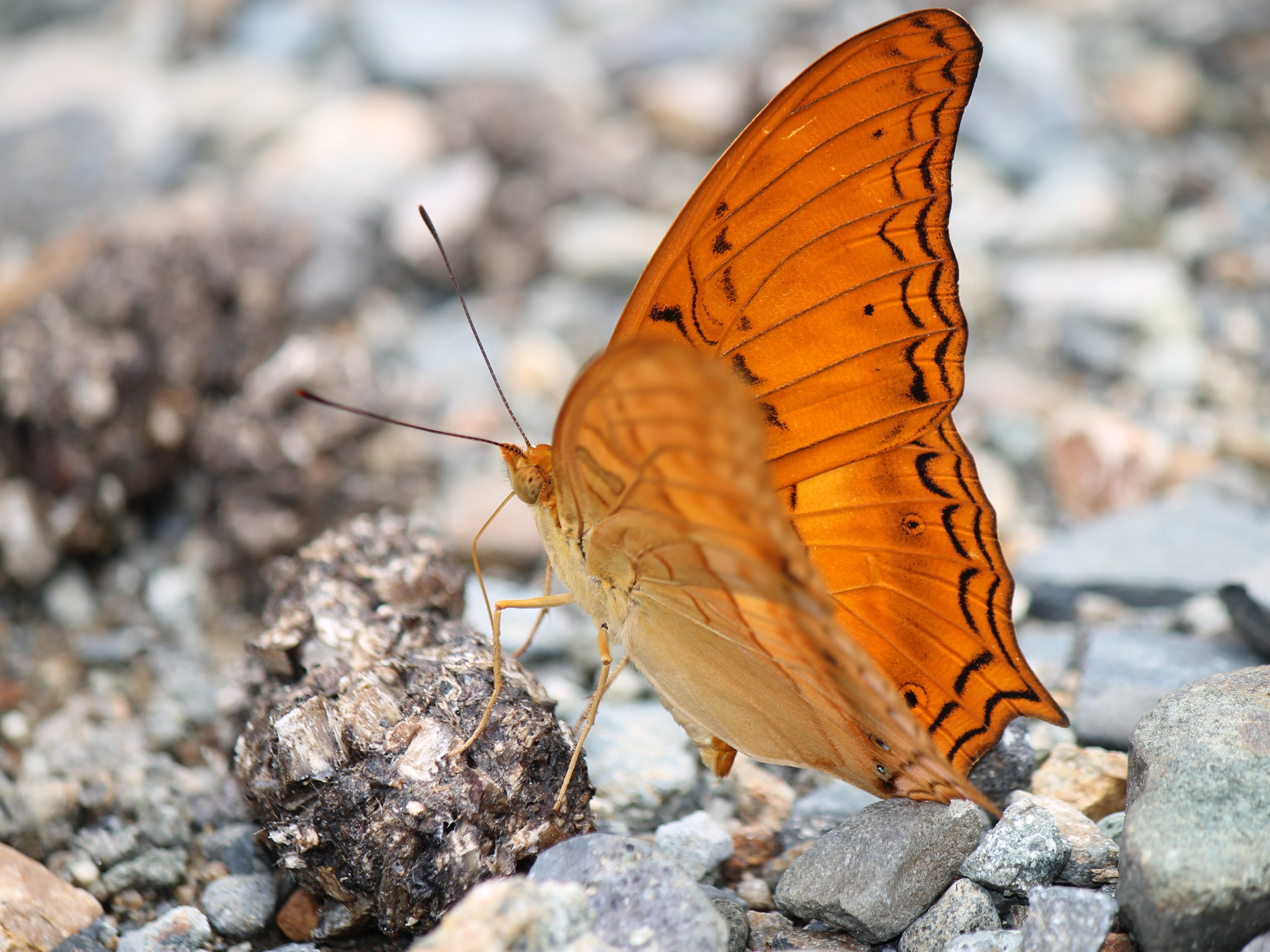

Scientific classification
- Kingdom: Animalia
- Phylum: Arthropoda
- Clade: Pancrustacea
- Class: Insecta
- Order: Lepidoptera
- Family: Nymphalidae
- Genus: Vindula
- Species: V. dejone

Binomial name
- Vindula dejone (Erichson, 1834)

Subspecies
- Many, see text

Synonyms
- Cynthia dejone Erichson, 1834; Cynthia erotella Butler, 1879; Cynthia cantori Distant, 1882; Vindula rafflesi Pendlebury, 1939; Cynthia obiensis Rothschild, 1899

= Vindula dejone =

Malay cruiser

Species of butterfly

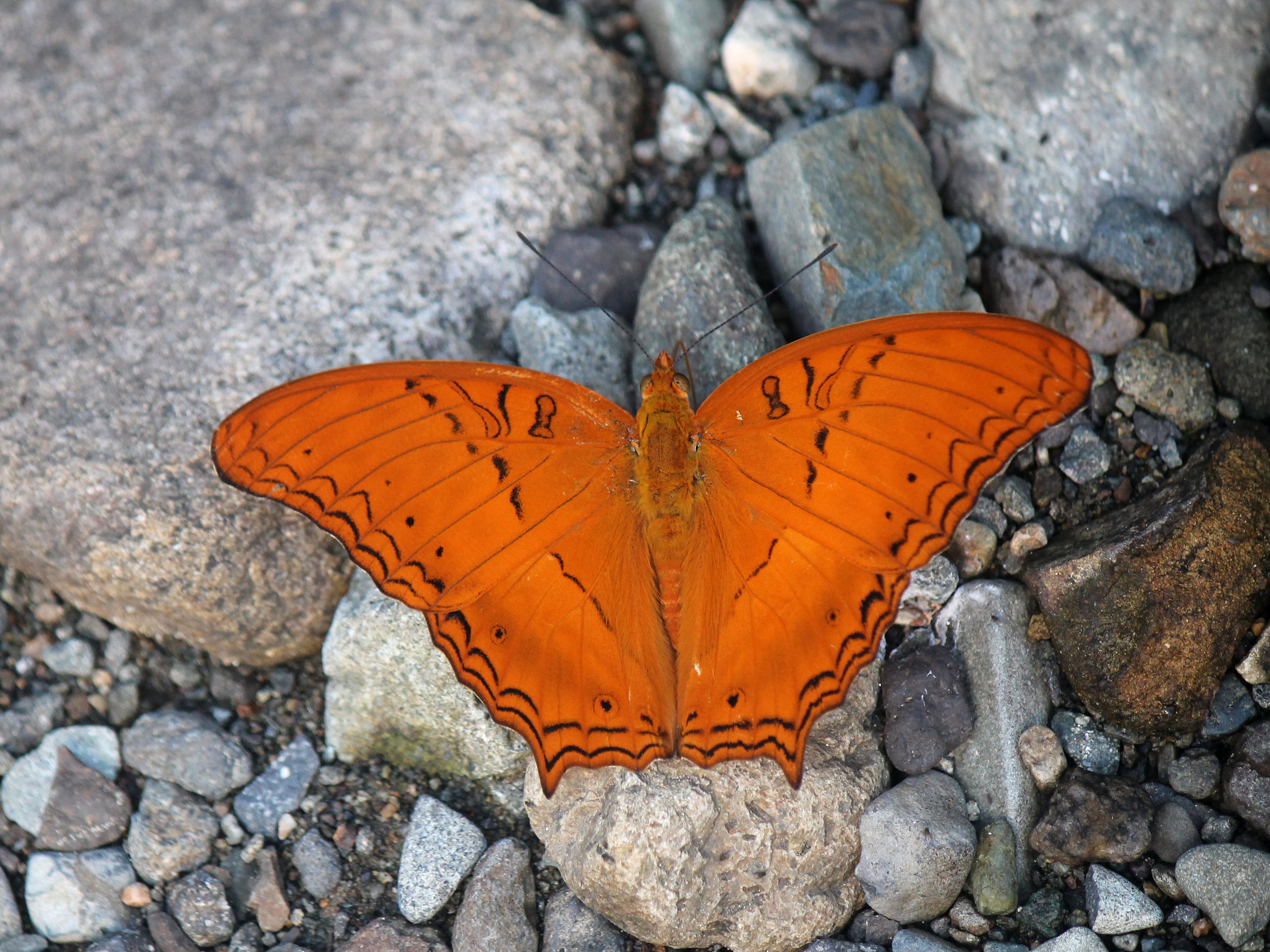
Upperside

Vindula dejone, the Malay cruiser, is a butterfly from the family Nymphalidae found in Southeast Asia. It is sexually dimorphic.

Larvae feed on Adenia.

== Subspecies ==
Listed alphabetically: (after)

- V. d. ambonensis Nieuwenhuis – Indonesia (Ambon)
- V. d. austrosundana (Fruhstorfer, 1897) – Indonesia (Java, Lesser Sunda Islands, Kalao)
- V. d. bagrada (Fruhstorfer, 1912) – Indonesia (Timor, Wetar)
- V. d. bongana Schröder & Treadaway, 1989 – Indonesia [?]
- V. d. buruana (Fruhstorfer, 1902) – Indonesia (Buru)
- V. d. bushi Tsukada, 1985 – Indonesia (Kabaena)
- V. d. celebensis (Butler, 1874) – Indonesia (Sulawesi)
- V. d. cycnia de Nicéville – Indonesia (Kai Island)
- V. d. dajakorum (Fruhstorfer, 1906) – Indonesia (Borneo)
- V. d. dejone (Erichson, 1834) – Philippines
- V. d. dioneia (Fruhstorfer, 1912) – Indonesia (Sula Island)
- V. d. dorokusana (Fruhstorfer, 1899) – Indonesia (Bachan, Halmahera)
- V. d. erotella (Butler, 1879) – Thailand, Laos, Cambodia, Vietnam, Malaysia (Peninsula), Singapore
- V. d. erotoides de Nicéville – Indonesia (Sumatra)
- V. d. elisae Casteleyn, 2008 – Indonesia (Sulawesi [Buton Regency (Batu Atas)])
- V. d. hildae Casteleyn, 2008 – Indonesia (Sulawesi [Wakatobi Regency])
- V. d. huyghei Casteleyn, 2008 – Indonesia (Pagai)
- V. d. javana Fruhstorfer – Indonesia (Java)
- V. d. kabiana (Fruhstorfer, 1912) – Indonesia (Salayer Island)
- V. d. natunensis (Fruhstorfer, 1906) – Indonesia (Natuna Islands)
- V. d. obiensis (Rothschild, 1899) – Indonesia (Obi)
- V. d. rafflesi Pendlebury, 1939 – Malaysia (Aur Island)
- V. d. satellitica (Fruhstorfer, 1899) – Indonesia (Banggai)
- V. d. sibutuensis Schröder & Treadaway, 1989 – Indonesia (Sulu Archipelago [Sibutu Island])
- V. d. susanoo Tsukada, 1985 – Indonesia (Talaud)
- V. d. tiomana (Pendlebury, 1933) – Malaysia (Tioman, Peninsula Malaysia)
