= Volkensin =

Neurotoxic protein

Volkensin is a eukaryotic ribosome-inactivating protein found in the Adenia volkensii plant. It is a glycoprotein with two subunits A and B. A subunit is linked to B subunit with disulfide bridges and non-covalent bonds. B subunit is responsible for binding to the galactosyl-terminated receptors on the cell membrane that allows the entry the A subunit of the toxin into the cell, which performs the inhibitory function. Volkensin is a galactose specific lectin that can inhibit protein synthesis in whole cells and in cell-free lysates. This protein can be included into the category of risin like toxins and it resembles modeccin, the toxin of Adenia digitata. Although very similar in composition, volkensin contains more cysteine residues and more than twice as much sugar than modeccin, due to high content of galactose and mannose. In addition, volkensin is able to inhibit protein synthesis at concentrations 10 times lower than required for modeccin. From gene sequencing analysis, volkensin was found to be coded by 1569-bp ORF, that is 523 amino acid residues without introns. The internal linker sequence is 45 bp. The active site of the A subunit contains Ser203, a novel residue that is conserved in all ribosome inactivating proteins.

The toxin can be isolated via affinity chromatography, using acid-treated Sepharose 6B.

Volkensin, and toxins alike are studied to understand protein entry into the cell and many have been found to have antitumor applicability. Rats that have been administered a high dose of volkensin died between 7 and 12 hours. For 1–2 hours after poisoning, rats behaved normally and then became sedated until death with short-lasting seizures. Rats that have been administered lower doses died within several days and showed wax-like peritoneal fat, which indicated the formation of a pancreatic lesion.

In addition, volkensin has been also found to agglutinate red blood cells without any specificity for a particular blood group. This is likely due to its affinity for galactose residues, which are in common with all three blood groups.

Volkensin is a potent neurotoxin that can kill neurons. It is able to bind to the axon terminal of neurons, where it is internalized and transported to the cell body and inactivates ribosomes, thereby killing the neuron. Experiments performed in vitro showed increased toxicity of volkensin to microglia and astrocytes.
