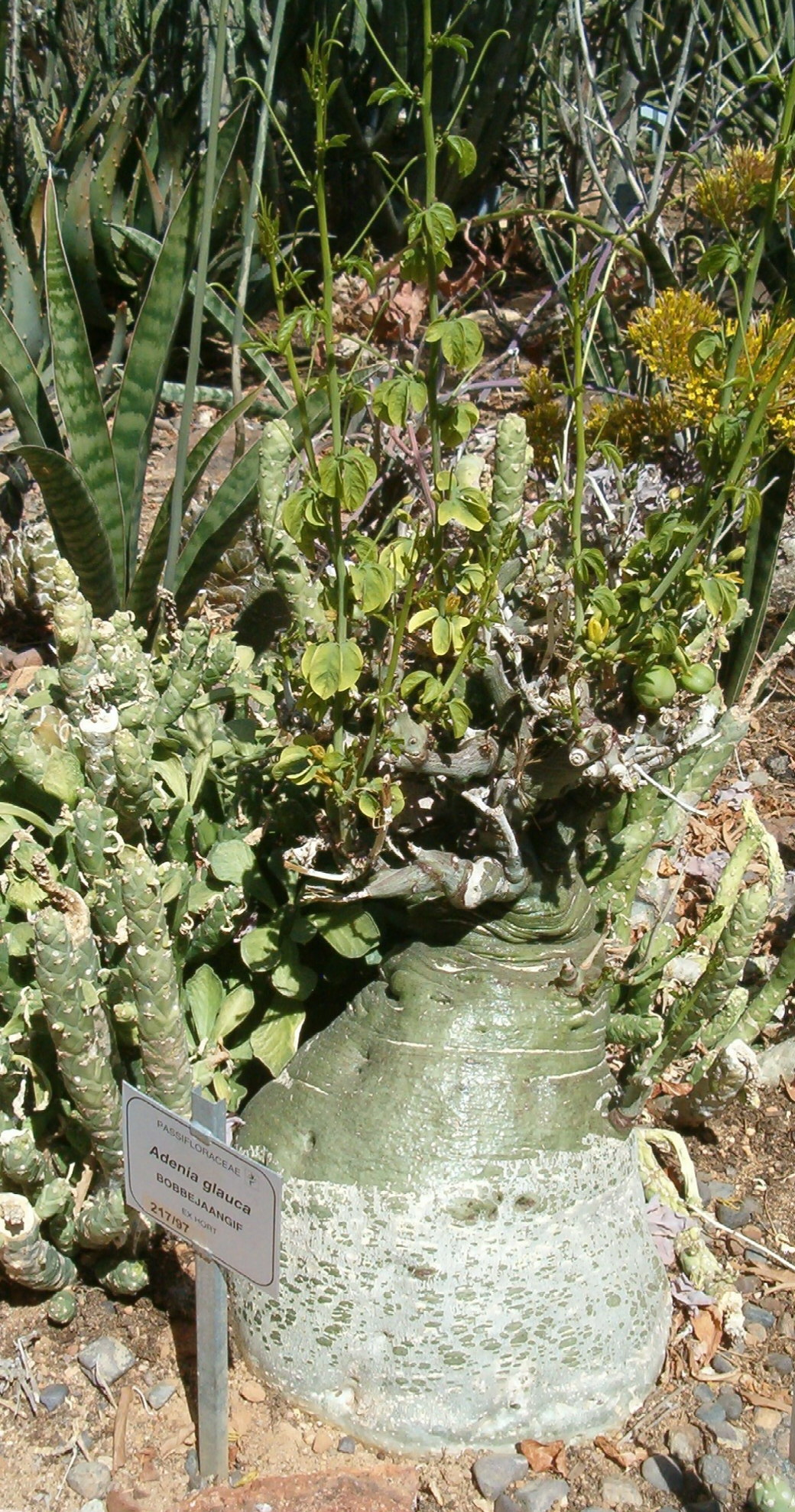

Scientific classification
- Kingdom: Plantae
- Clade: Tracheophytes
- Clade: Angiosperms
- Clade: Eudicots
- Clade: Rosids
- Order: Malpighiales
- Family: Passifloraceae
- Genus: Adenia
- Species: A. glauca

Binomial name
- Adenia glauca Schinz

= Adenia glauca =

Species of flowering plant

Adenia glauca is a species of flowering plant in the passionflower family, Passifloraceae. It is native to southern Africa, where it occurs in southeastern Botswana and northern South Africa.

It grows from 0.5 to 3.5 m tall, with its main stem enlarged at ground level.
