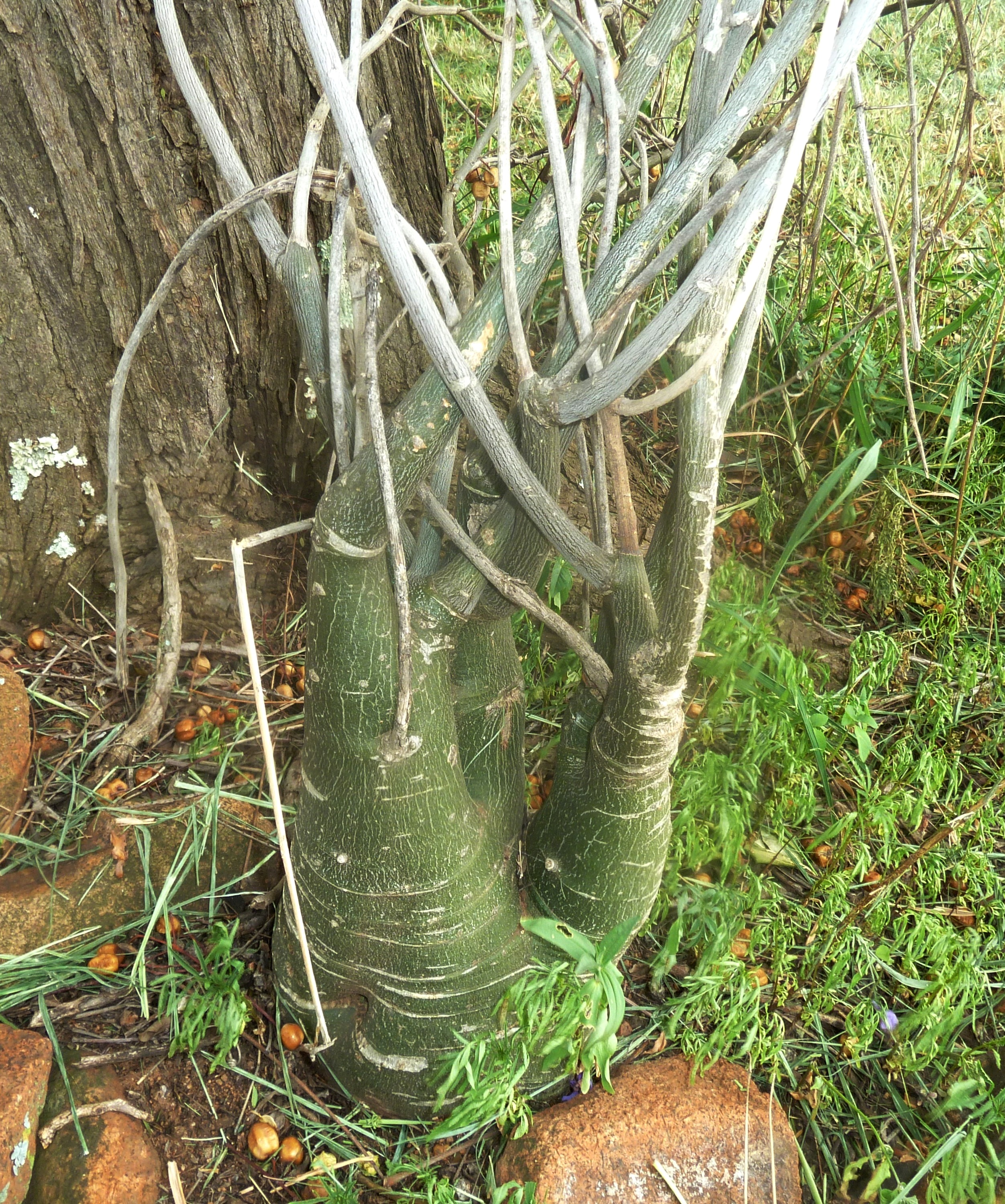

Conservation status
- Least Concern (IUCN 3.1)

Scientific classification
- Kingdom: Plantae
- Clade: Tracheophytes
- Clade: Angiosperms
- Clade: Eudicots
- Clade: Rosids
- Order: Malpighiales
- Family: Passifloraceae
- Genus: Adenia
- Species: A. fruticosa

Binomial name
- Adenia fruticosa Burtt Davy

= Adenia fruticosa =

Species of flowering plant

Adenia fruticosa is a species of flowering plant in the passionflower family, Passifloraceae. It is native to KwaZulu-Natal and the Northern Provinces of South Africa and to Zimbabwe.
