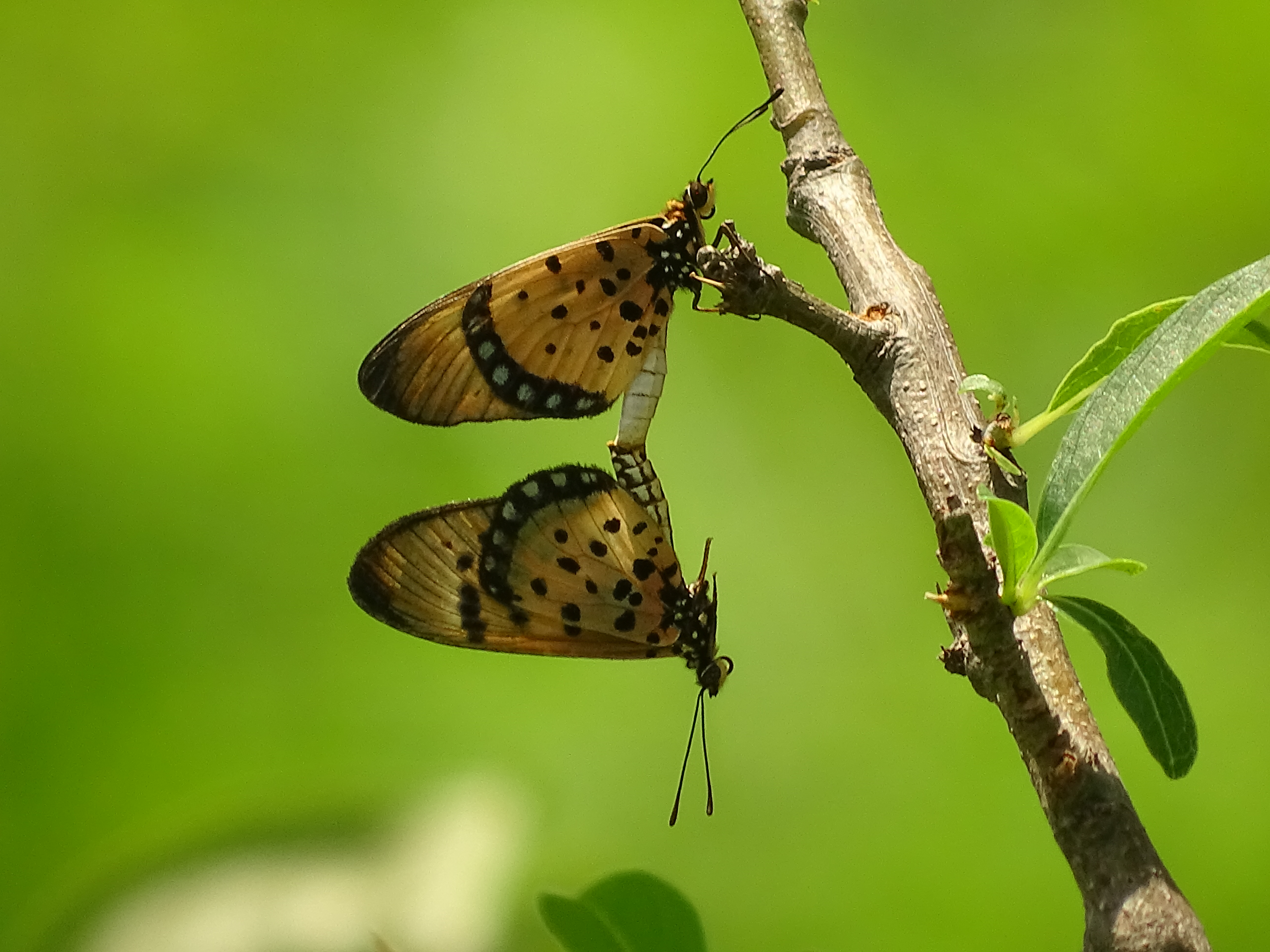
- Mating in Pendjari NP, the male above

Scientific classification
- Kingdom: Animalia
- Phylum: Arthropoda
- Clade: Pancrustacea
- Class: Insecta
- Order: Lepidoptera
- Family: Nymphalidae
- Genus: Acraea
- Species: A. caecilia

Binomial name
- Acraea caecilia (Fabricius, 1781)

Synonyms
- Papilio caecilia Fabricius, 1781; Acraea (Acraea) caecilia; Papilio hypatia Drury, 1782; Papilio artemesa Stoll, 1790; Telchinia bendis Hübner, 1819; Acraea caecilia f. varia Le Doux, 1923; Acraea caecilia f. pudora Aurivillius, 1910; Acraea caecilia ab. umbrina Aurivillius, 1910; Acraea caecilia ab. nuda Wichgraf, 1914

= Acraea caecilia =

Pink acraea

Species of butterfly

Acraea caecilia, the pink acraea, is a butterfly in the family Nymphalidae. It is found in Senegal, Gambia, Guinea-Bissau, Guinea, Mali, Sierra Leone, Liberia, Ivory Coast, Burkina Faso, Ghana, Togo, Benin, Nigeria, Chad, Sudan, the Democratic Republic of the Congo, Ethiopia, Uganda, Kenya, Tanzania and Malawi.

== Description ==
A. caecilia F. is similar to the preceding species, [ Acraea natalica but on an average smaller (expanse 56 to 70 mm.) and differs in having the discal dots in cellules 4 to 6 of the forewing smaller, rounder and further removed from the apex of the cell; the forewing has 2 to 4 submarginal dots (in lb to 4). Ground-colour above light reddish yellow to salmon-colour; base of both wings and apex of the fore wing black for the same extent as in natalica; hindwing above always with sharply defined black marginal band about 2 mm. in breadth, not or indistinctly spotted; under surface as in natalica, but the red spots on the hindwing indistinct. Senegal to Nigeria; Nubia; Uganda; Abyssinia; Somaliland; British and German East Africa.- female ab. artemisa Stoll has the ground-colour above white, with the black markings much widened. West Africa ? - female ab. hypatia Drury only differs in the darker, redder ground-colour of the upper surface. Sierra Leone. - pudora Auriv. (55 g) is an eastern race, in which the black colour at the apex of the forewing is only very narrow and does not- cover the base of cellules 7 and 8. German and British East Africa. - ab. umbrina Auriv. only differs from pudora in the forewing above having between veins 2 and 5 or 6 a grey, semitransparent submarginal nebulous band.

== Subspecies ==
- A. c. caecilia — Senegal, Gambia, Guinea-Bissau, Guinea, Mali, Sierra Leone, Liberia, Ivory Coast, Burkina Faso, Ghana, Togo, Benin, northern Nigeria, Chad, southern Sudan, northern Democratic Republic of the Congo, Ethiopia, Uganda, western Kenya, north-western Tanzania
- A. c. kulal van Someren, 1936 — Kenya: north to Mount Kulal and Mount Marsabit
- A. c. pudora Aurivillius, 1910 — eastern Kenya, eastern and central Tanzania, northern Malawi

Torben Larsen developed a species numbering system for his 2005 publication Butterflies of West Africa. The nominate subspecies is #1179. The 'Larsen' numbers have since been used with permission in A Sharp Eye on Butterflies of Ghana.

== Biology ==
The habitat consists of savanna and dry thornbush.

The larvae feed on Wormskioldia (including W. pilosa) and Adenia species (including A. cissampeloides).

== Taxonomy ==
It is a member of the Acraea caecilia species group. See also Pierre & Bernaud, 2014.
