= Vindula sapor =

Scientific classification
- Domain: Eukaryota
- Kingdom: Animalia
- Phylum: Arthropoda
- Class: Insecta
- Order: Lepidoptera
- Family: Nymphalidae
- Genus: Vindula
- Species: V. sapor

Binomial name
- Vindula sapor (Godman & Salvin, 1888)

Subspecies
- 3, see text

Synonyms
- Cynthia sapor Godman & Salvin, 1888

Species of butterfly

Vindula sapor is a butterfly from the family Nymphalidae found in New Guinea. It is sexually dimorphic.

== Subspecies ==
Listed alphabetically.

- V. s. albosignata Talbot, 1932 – (Solomons)
- V. s. obscura (Ribbe, 1898) – (Bougainville, Shortlands)
- V. s. sapor – (Guadalcanal, Arawa, Choiseul)
