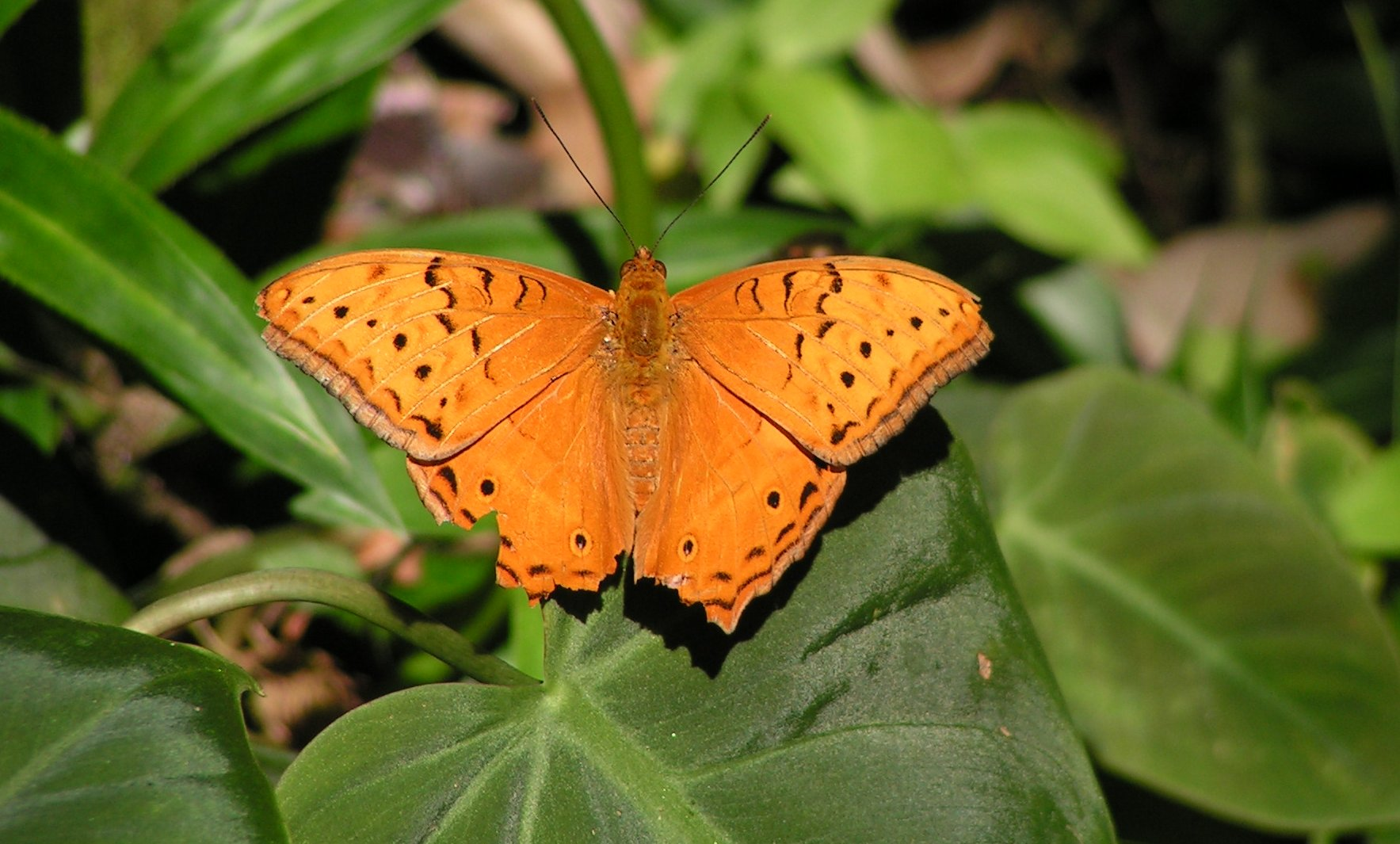
- Male Vindula arsinoe, Cairns, Australia
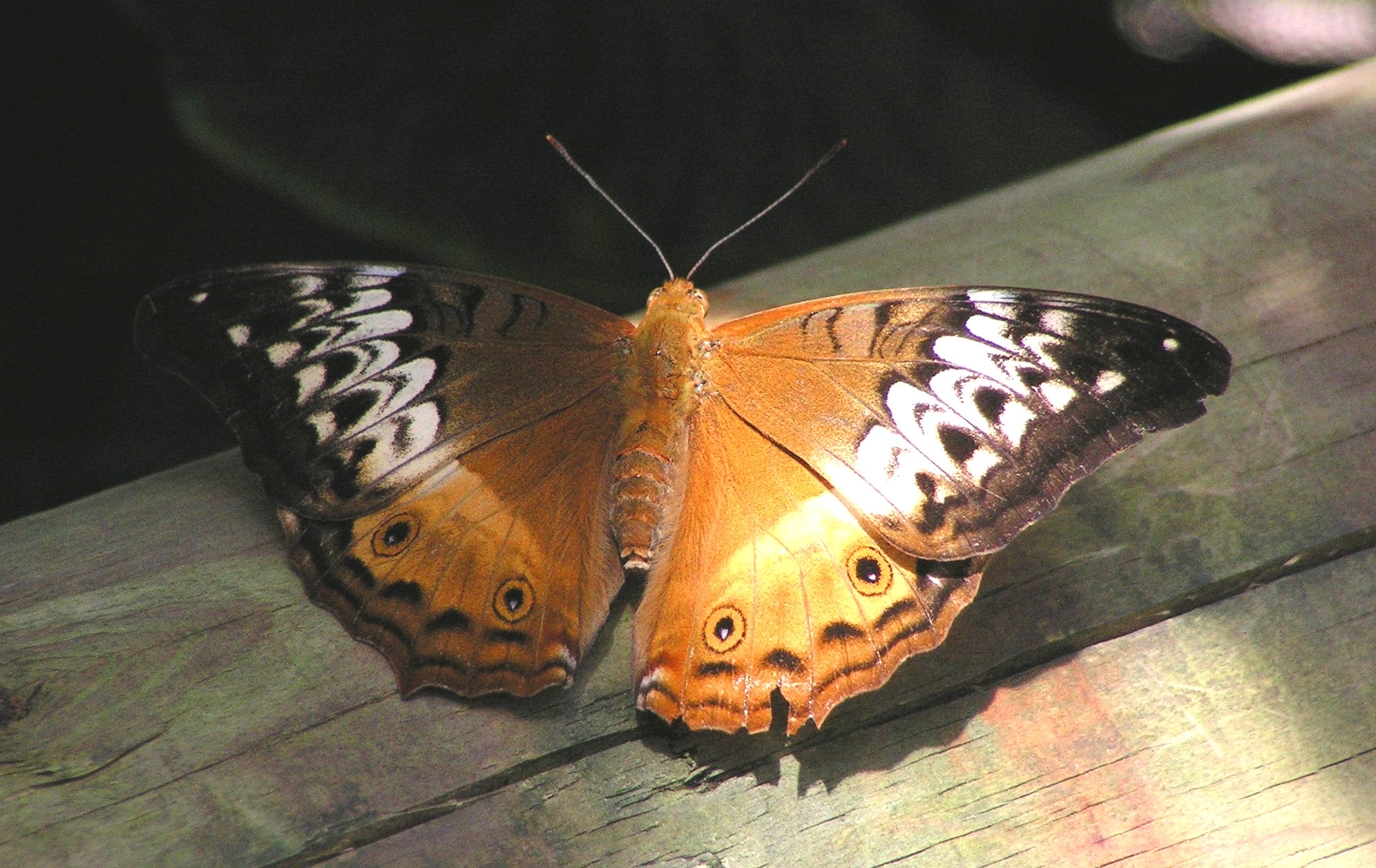
- Female Vindula arsinoe, Cairns, Australia

Scientific classification
- Kingdom: Animalia
- Phylum: Arthropoda
- Clade: Pancrustacea
- Class: Insecta
- Order: Lepidoptera
- Family: Nymphalidae
- Tribe: Vagrantini
- Genus: Vindula; Hemming, 1934

Species
- Four, see text

= Vindula =

Cruiser

Genus of brush-footed butterflies

Vindula, commonly called cruisers, is a genus of butterflies of the subfamily Heliconiinae in the family Nymphalidae found in southeast Asia and Australia. These butterflies are dimorphic.

== Species ==
Ordered alphabetically:

- Vindula arsinoe (Cramer, 1777) – Eastern cruiser
- Vindula dejone (Erichson, 1834) – Malay cruiser, lesser cruiser
- Vindula erota (Fabricius, 1793) – common cruiser
- Vindula sapor (Godman & Salvin, 1888)
