= Adenia stylosa =

Scientific classification
- Kingdom: Plantae
- Clade: Tracheophytes
- Clade: Angiosperms
- Clade: Eudicots
- Clade: Rosids
- Order: Malpighiales
- Family: Passifloraceae
- Genus: Adenia
- Species: A. stylosa

Binomial name
- Adenia stylosa (H.Perrier) Hearn
- It is endemic to Madagascar

Synonyms
- Adenia epigea var. stylosa H.Perrier; Adenia firingalavensis var. stylosa (H.Perrier) W.J.de Wilde

Species of plant

Adenia stylosa is a species of flowering plant of the Passifloraceae family endemic to Madagascar.

== Description ==
The sizable mature storage stems are mostly spheroid, and possess a wrinkled, grey to beige surface. It is a dioecious species (i.e. there are separate male and female plants). The flowers can reach up to 30 mm.

== Taxonomy ==
It was first published as the variety Adenia epigea var. stylosa H.Perrier by Joseph Marie Henry Alfred Perrier de la Bâthie in 1940. It was elevated to the species Adenia stylosa (H.Perrier) Hearn by David John Hearn in 2007 based on morphological differences and genetic data.

== Ecology ==
In Ankarana National Park, Madagascar, it occurs in dry forests on limestone soils.
