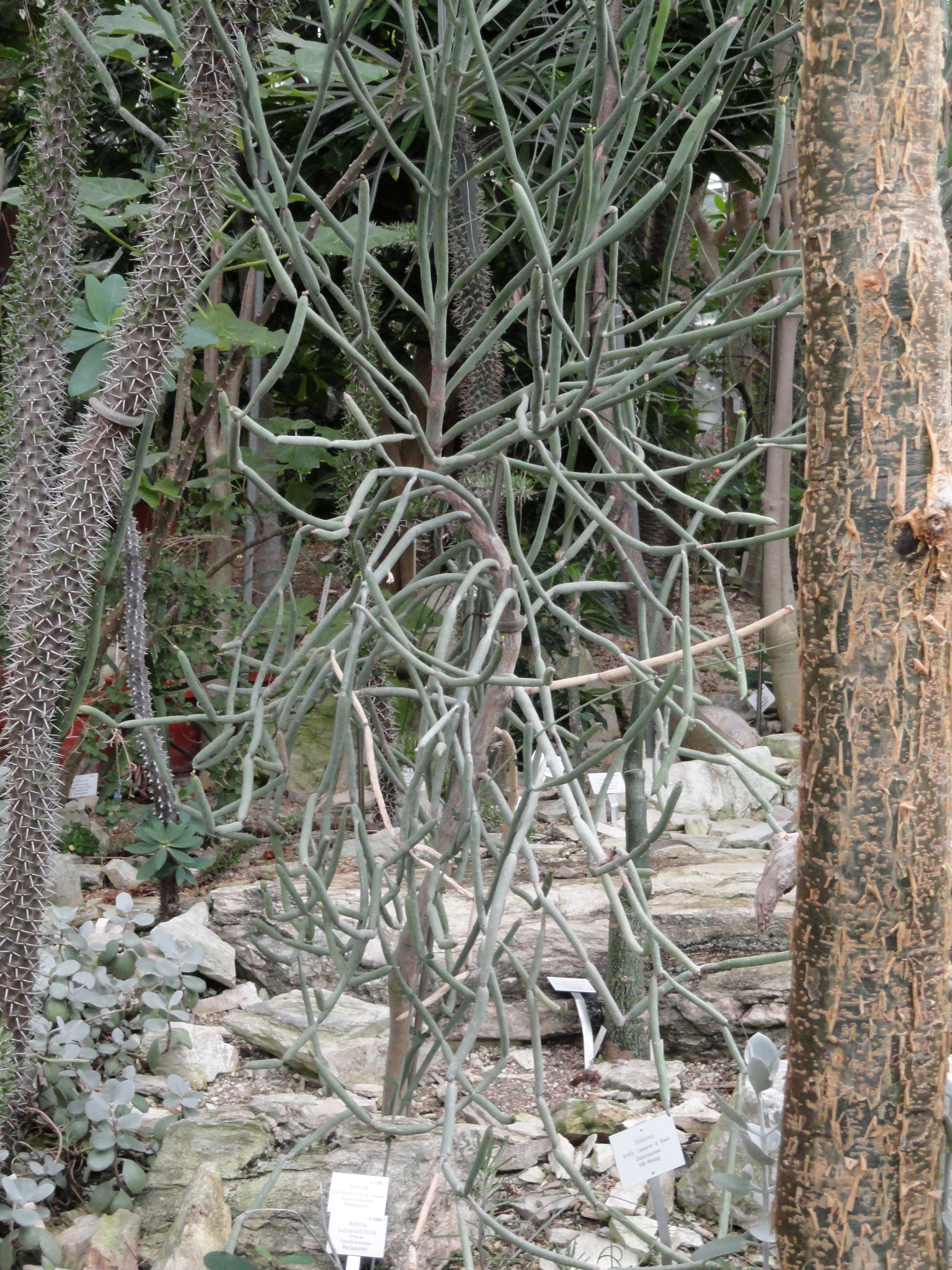
- CITES Appendix II (CITES)

Scientific classification
- Kingdom: Plantae
- Clade: Tracheophytes
- Clade: Angiosperms
- Clade: Eudicots
- Clade: Rosids
- Order: Malpighiales
- Family: Passifloraceae
- Genus: Adenia
- Species: A. subsessilifolia

Binomial name
- Adenia subsessilifolia H. Perrier

= Adenia subsessilifolia =

Species of flowering plant

Adenia subsessilifolia is a species of flowering plant in the passionflower family, Passifloraceae, described by Joseph Marie Henry Alfred Perrier de la Bâthie. Adenia subsessilifolia is endemic to southern Madagascar. No subspecies are listed in the Catalogue of Life.
