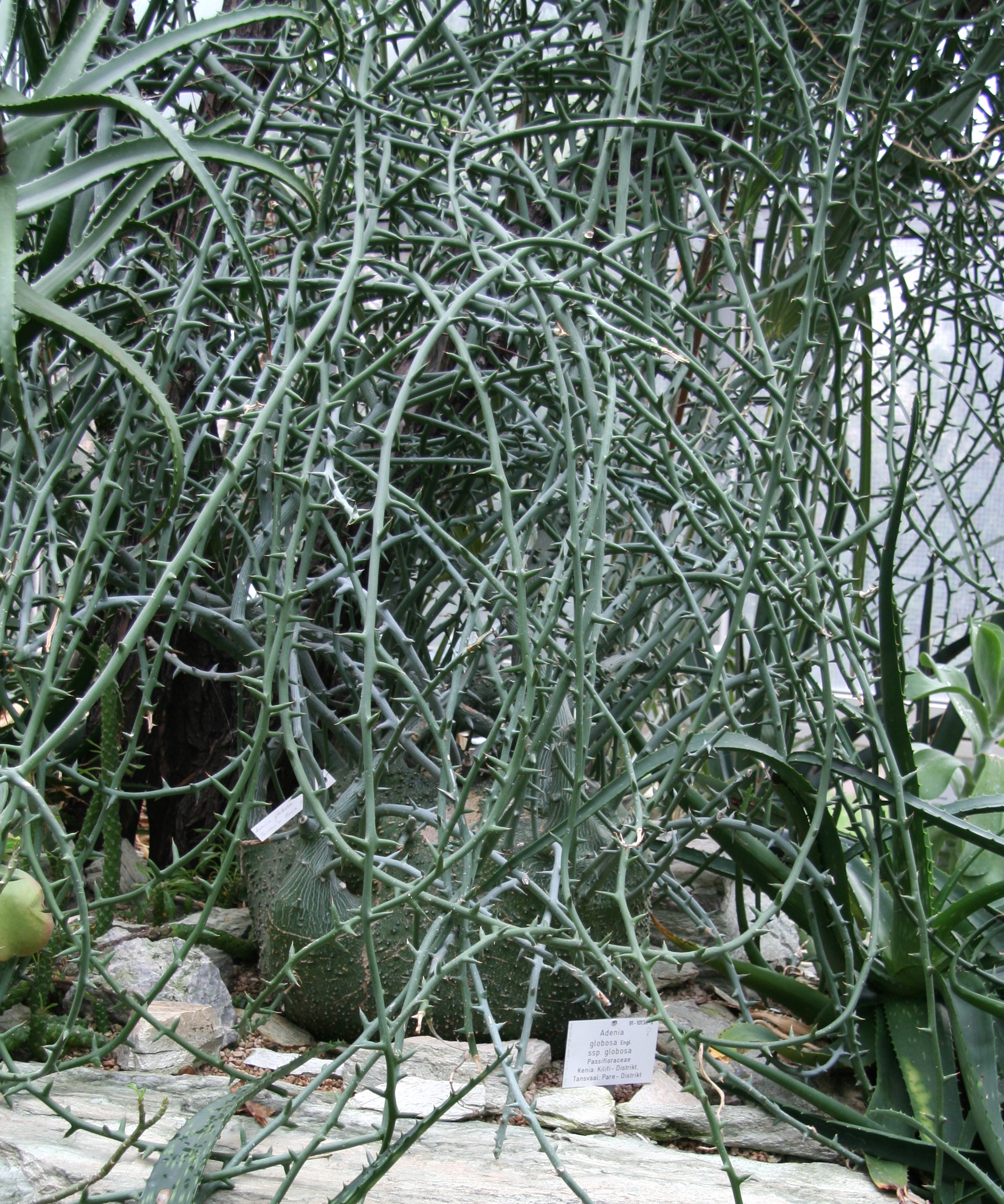

Conservation status
- Least Concern (IUCN 3.1)

Scientific classification
- Kingdom: Plantae
- Clade: Tracheophytes
- Clade: Angiosperms
- Clade: Eudicots
- Clade: Rosids
- Order: Malpighiales
- Family: Passifloraceae
- Genus: Adenia
- Species: A. globosa

Binomial name
- Adenia globosa Engl.

Subspecies
- A. g. subsp. curvata (Verdc.) W.J.de Wilde; A. g. subsp. pseudoglobosa (Verdc.) W.J.de Wilde

= Adenia globosa =

Species of flowering plant

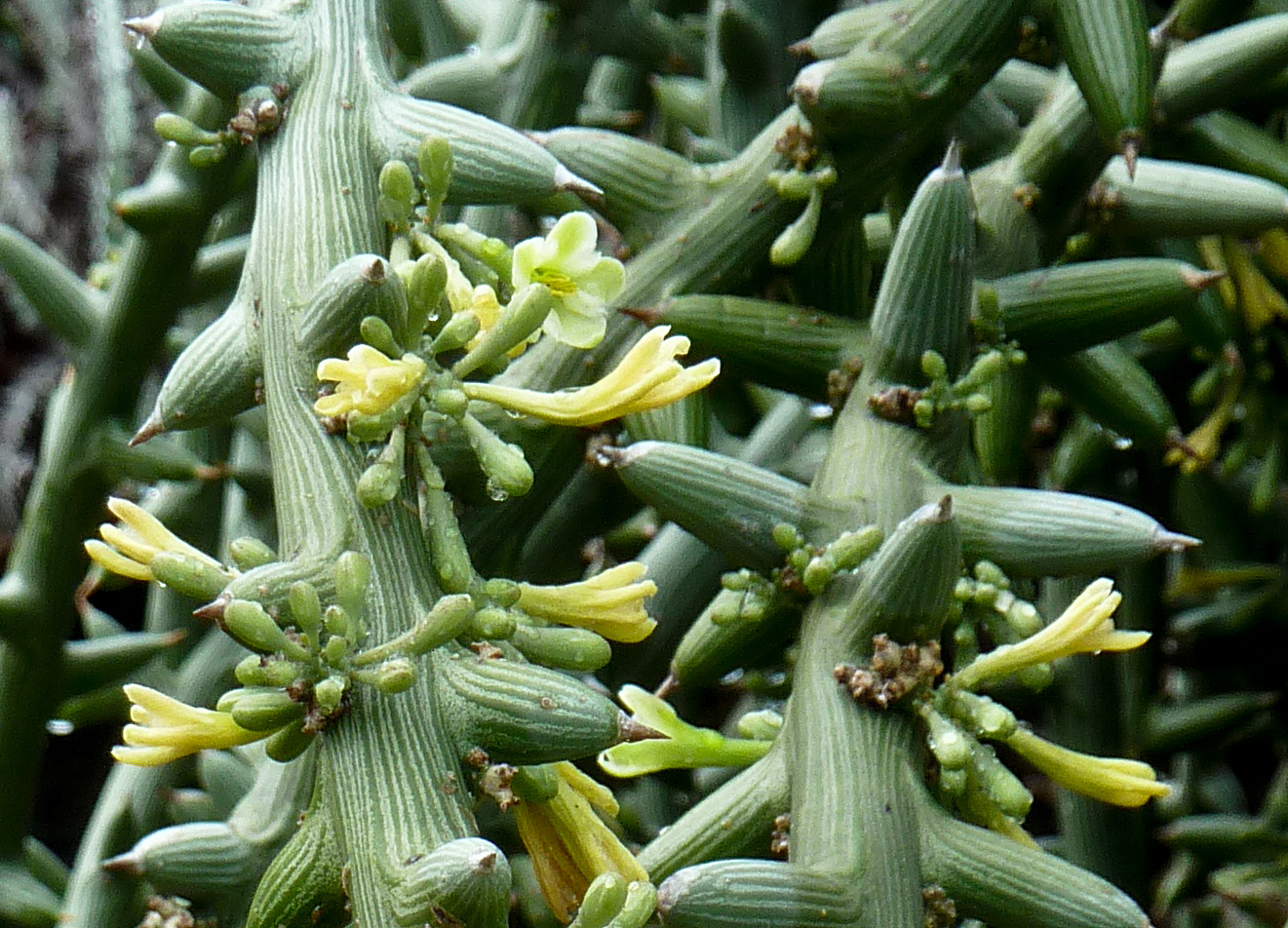
Adenia globosa in flower, Kapiʻolani Community College, Honolulu

Adenia globosa is a species of flowering plant in the passionflower family, Passifloraceae. It is native to tropical Africa, where it occurs in Ethiopia, Kenya, Somalia, and Tanzania. It is known as mpaga in Swahili.

== Description ==
This is a shrub or climbing plant with a warty trunk up to 8 meters tall when growing erect. It may take a shorter, wider form, becoming globular in shape and over 2 meters wide. It is usually succulent and thorns up to 8 centimeters long. The alternately arranged leaves are entire and triangular in shape or divided into 3 lobes. The blade is no more than 7 millimeters long. There is one gland near the base. The greenish flowers are solitary or borne in cymes of up to 5 in the leaf axils. The species is dioecious, with male and female flowers on separate plants. The male flower is up to 2 centimeters long with 5 stamens, and the female flower is about one centimeter long with three styles. The fruit is a green, leathery, rounded or oval capsule up to 3 centimeters long.

== Ecology ==
The plant grows in African scrub savanna habitat.

== Uses ==
The plant is used in traditional African medicine for abdominal pain and itching. The Maasai people use it as medicine for their cattle. In lower Taita region of Taita hills of Coastal Kenya, the pilled bulbous part of the plant is used to purify and clean dirty water. The plant is cultivated and traded as an ornamental.
