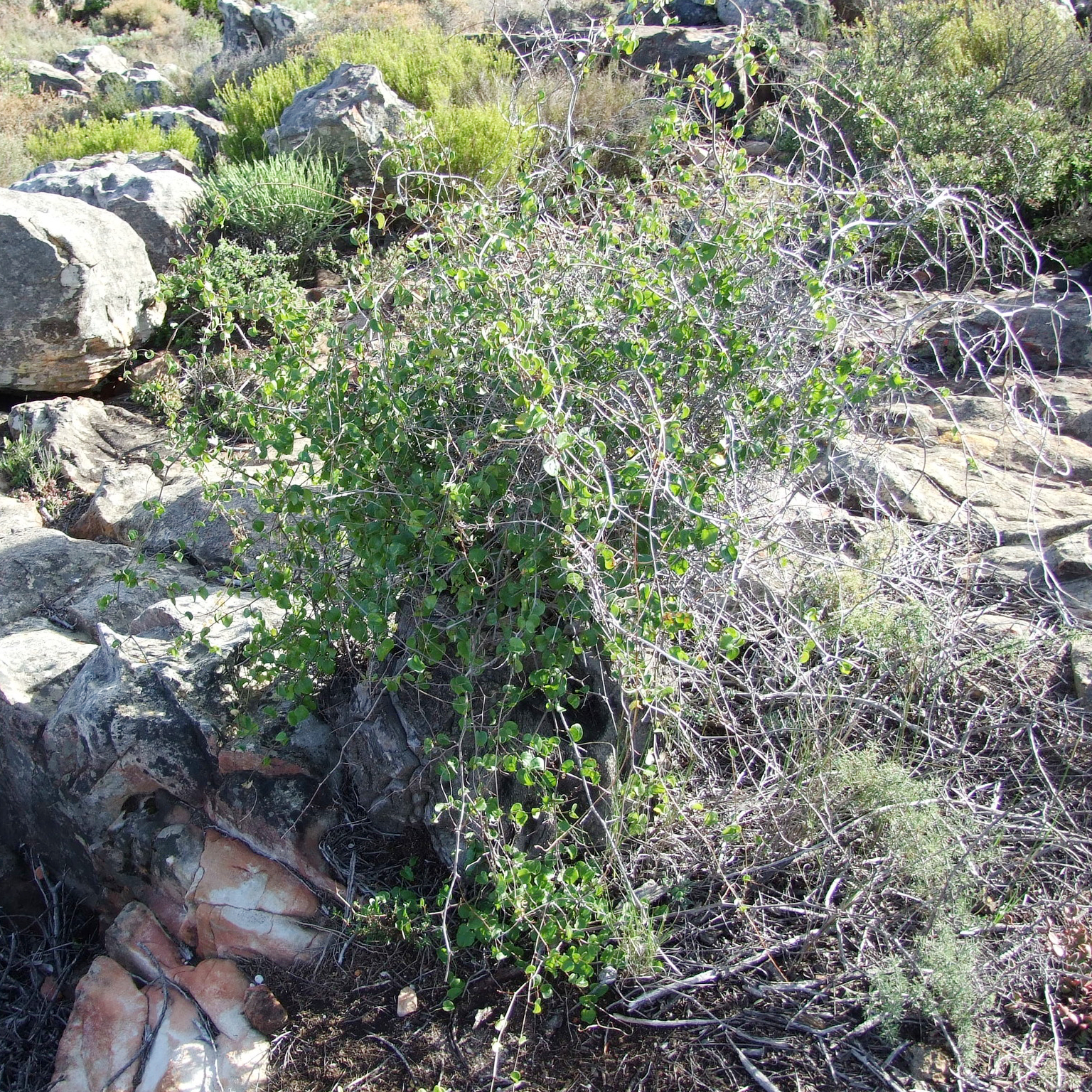
- Dioscorea elephantipes in the Cederberg Wilderness Area, Western Cape, South Africa

Scientific classification
- Kingdom: Plantae
- Clade: Tracheophytes
- Clade: Angiosperms
- Clade: Monocots
- Order: Dioscoreales
- Family: Dioscoreaceae
- Genus: Dioscorea
- Species: D. elephantipes

Binomial name
- Dioscorea elephantipes (L'Hér.) Engl.

= Dioscorea elephantipes =

Species of yam from Africa

Dioscorea elephantipes, the elephant's foot yam or Hottentot bread, is a species of flowering plant in the genus Dioscorea of the family Dioscoreaceae, native to the dry interior of South Africa.

== Description ==
It is a deciduous climber. It takes the name "elephant's foot" from the appearance of its large, partially buried, tuberous stem or caudex, which grows very slowly but often reaches a considerable size, often more than 3 m (10 ft) in circumference with a height of nearly 1 m (3 ft 3 in) above ground. This tuber can weigh as much as 365 kg. It is rich in starch, whence the name Hottentot bread, and is covered on the outside with thick, hard, corky plates.

Primarily a winter grower, it develops slender, leafy, climbing shoots with dark-spotted, greenish-yellow flowers in winter (May or June in habitat) The flowers are dioecious, with male or female flowers occurring on separate plants.

== Distribution ==
Its natural habitat is the arid inland regions of the Cape, stretching from the centre of the Northern Cape (where it occurs around Springbok), south to the Clanwilliam & Cederberg area, and eastwards through the districts of Graaff Reinet, Uniondale and Willowmore, as far as Grahamstown.

It was recently rediscovered in a section of the Northern Cape Province by an expedition collecting seeds for the Millennium Seed Bank Project.

In this area, it is most common on rocky north & east-facing slopes, in quartz or shale based soils.

== Cultivation ==
This species is not difficult to cultivate, however it requires extremely coarse, well-drained soil, and sparse watering. Importantly, it is deciduous and loses its leaves in the summer. At this time it goes through a dry dormancy period. It has gained the Royal Horticultural Society's Award of Garden Merit.

=== Watering ===
This species indicates when it is requiring water, by the presence of green growth. From when a new growth appears from the thick stem (caudex), it can receive regular watering, up until the growth withers and dies back. This is when the plant goes into its summer dormancy. Then watering should become more rare – until the next new growth appears.

The cycle can be extremely unpredictable or erratic, but in most cases this results in a watering regime of wetter winter and spring, and a dry summer dormancy period.

=== Sun and shade ===
In nature, the caudex is usually in shade beneath thicket vegetation, and only the leafy tendrils reach up to the sunlight. Therefore, the caudex is sensitive to prolonged exposure to heat and full sunlight, and a dappled-sun or semi-shaded position is preferable. The green vine tendrils however, thrive if they are able to reach partial or full sunlight.

=== Soil ===
This plant grows naturally in brush on rocky slopes, so it requires extremely well-drained soil, with a large (at least 50%) mineral component.

=== Temperatures ===
In cultivation in temperate areas, D. elephantipes can tolerate temperatures to −4 °C in habitat.

== Gallery ==
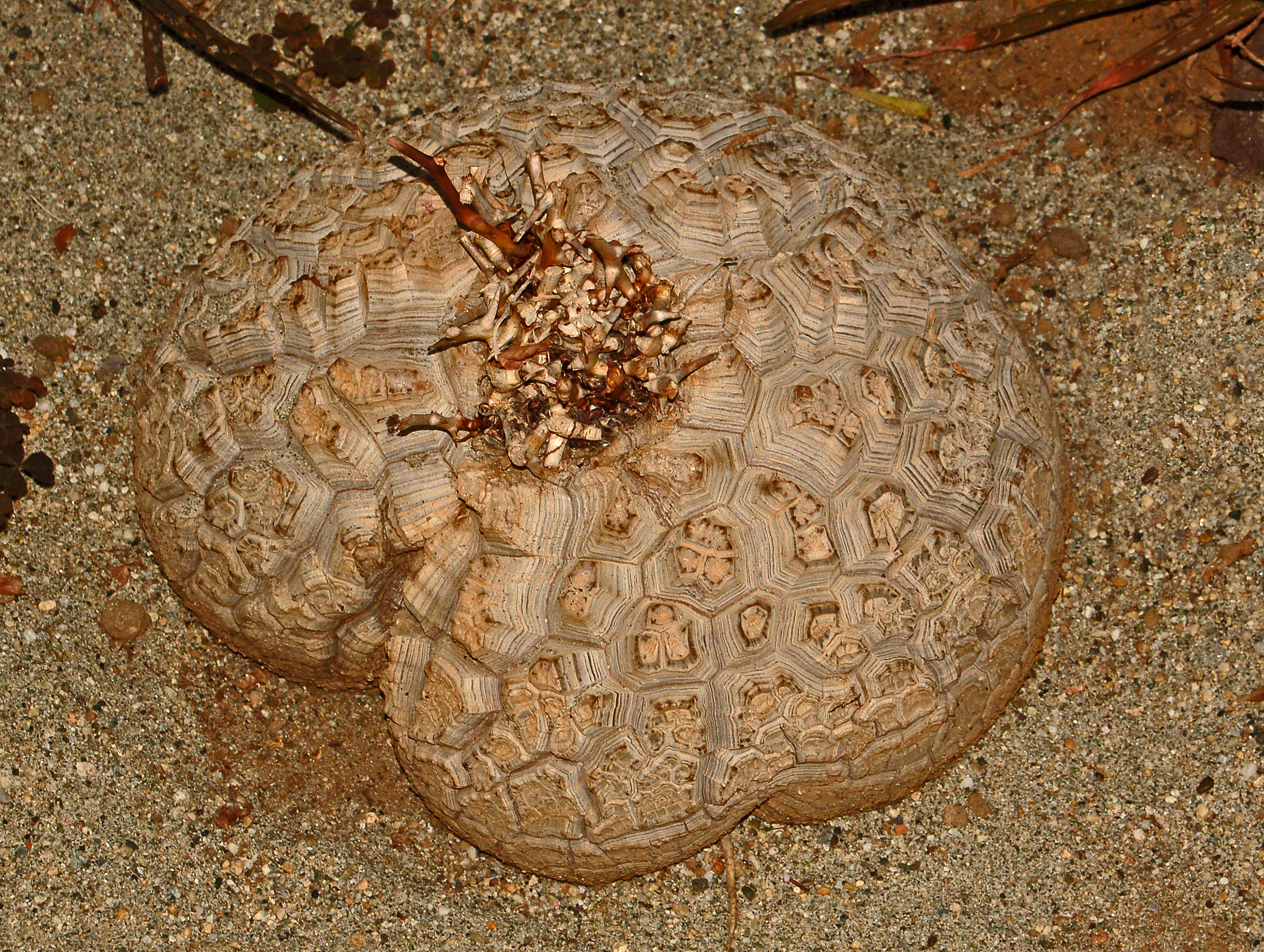
Large tuberous stem

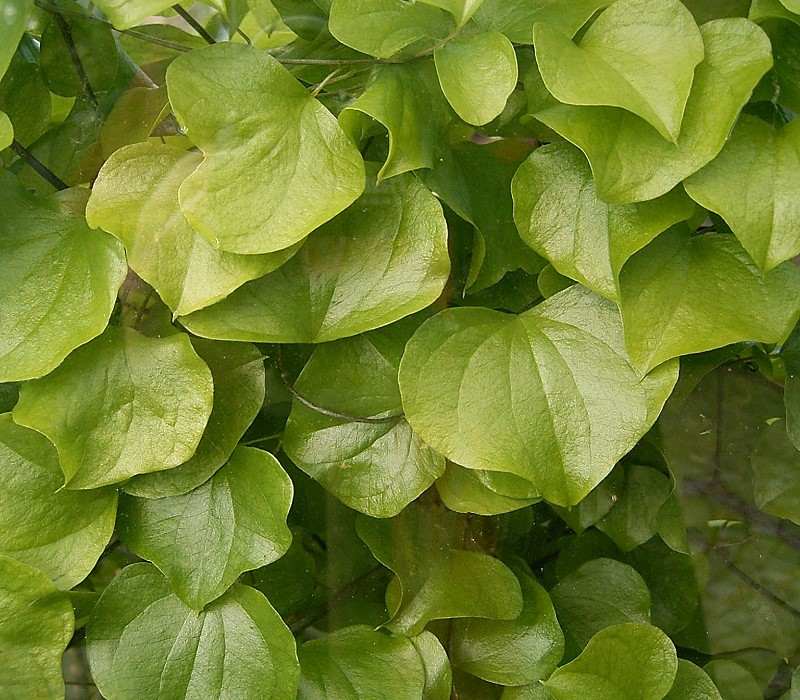
Leaves

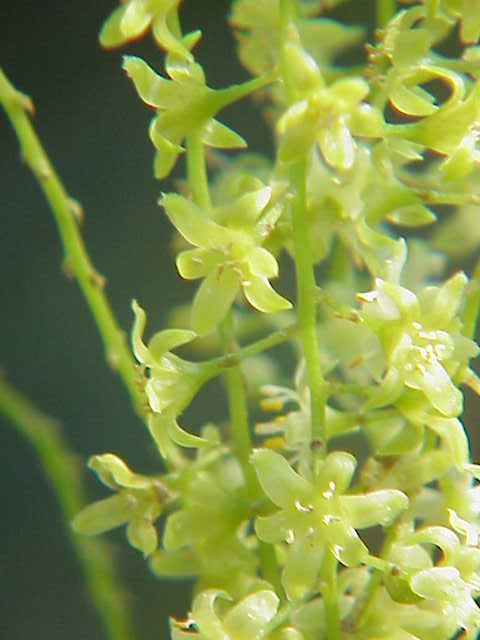
Flowers
