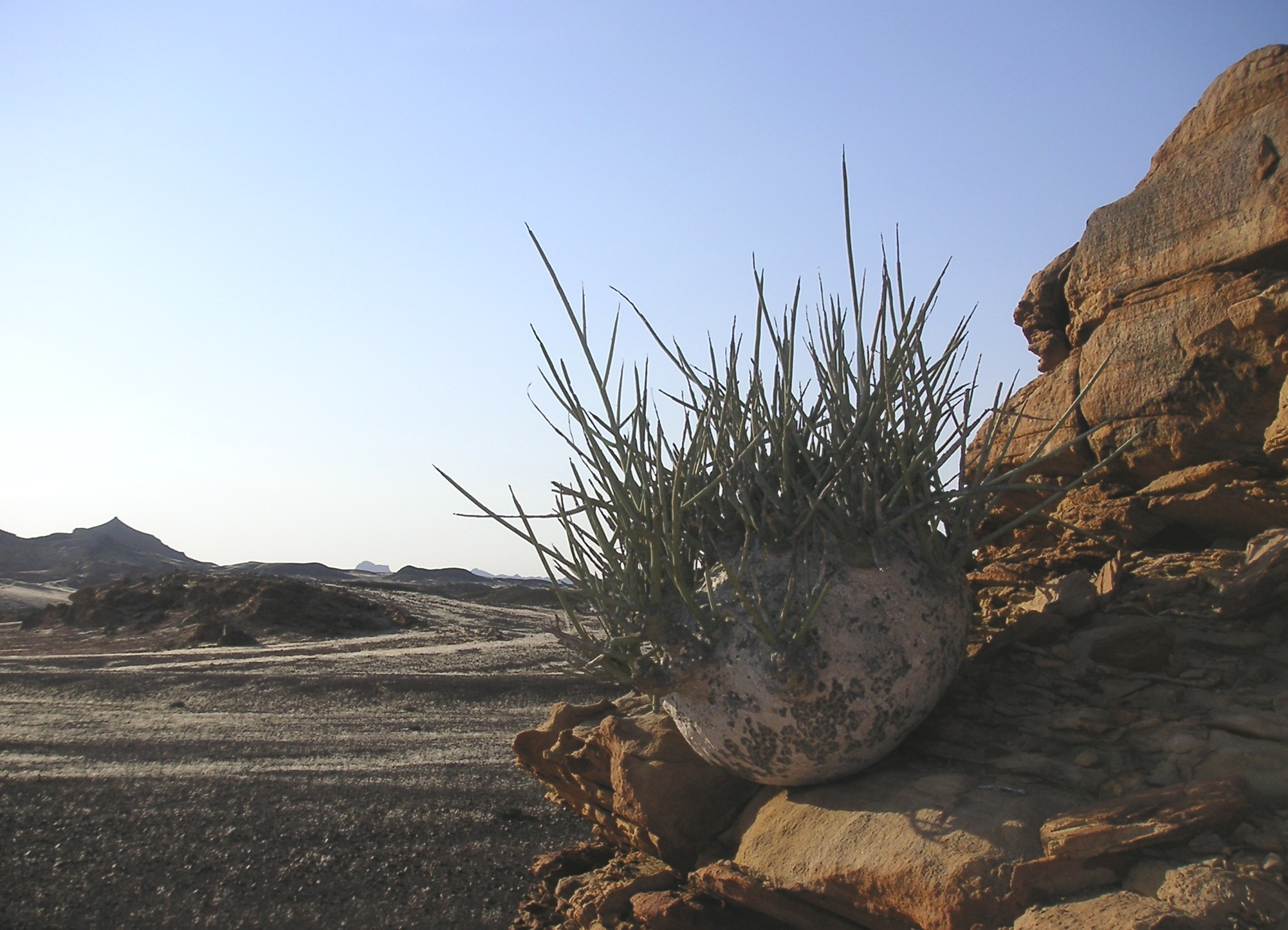

Conservation status
- Critically Endangered (IUCN 3.1)

Scientific classification
- Kingdom: Plantae
- Clade: Tracheophytes
- Clade: Angiosperms
- Clade: Eudicots
- Clade: Rosids
- Order: Malpighiales
- Family: Passifloraceae
- Genus: Adenia
- Species: A. pechuelii

Binomial name
- Adenia pechuelii (Engl.) Harms

Synonyms
- Echinothamnus pechuelii Engl.

= Adenia pechuelii =

Species of flowering plant

Adenia pechuelii is a species of plant in the family Passifloraceae. It is endemic to Namibia. Its population is made up of mostly small subpopulations, and most of these are affected by collecting. It was previously considered to be a species of least concern, but was reclassified as Critically endangered in late 2025, primarily due to persistent poaching of small and immature plants.
