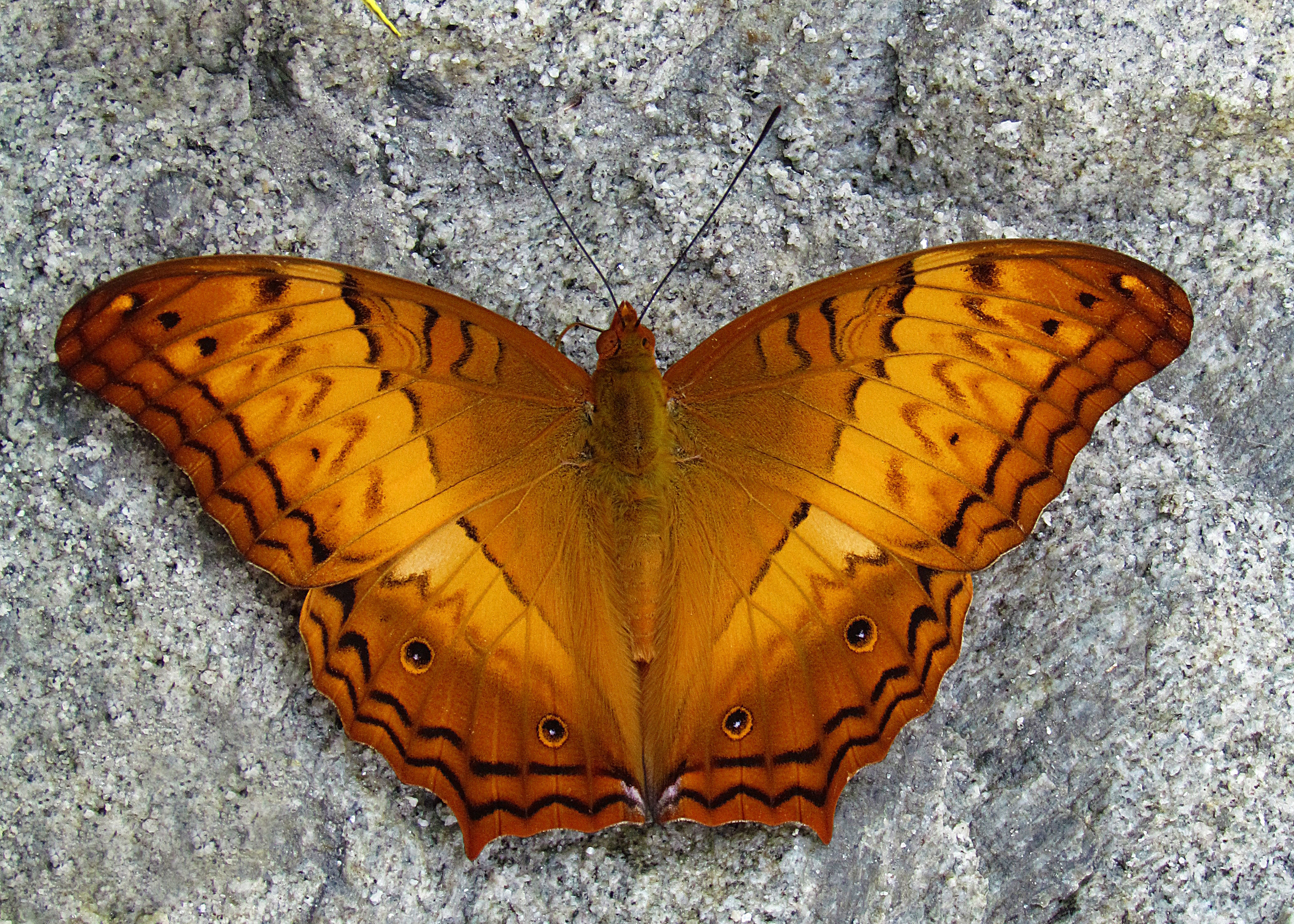
- Male
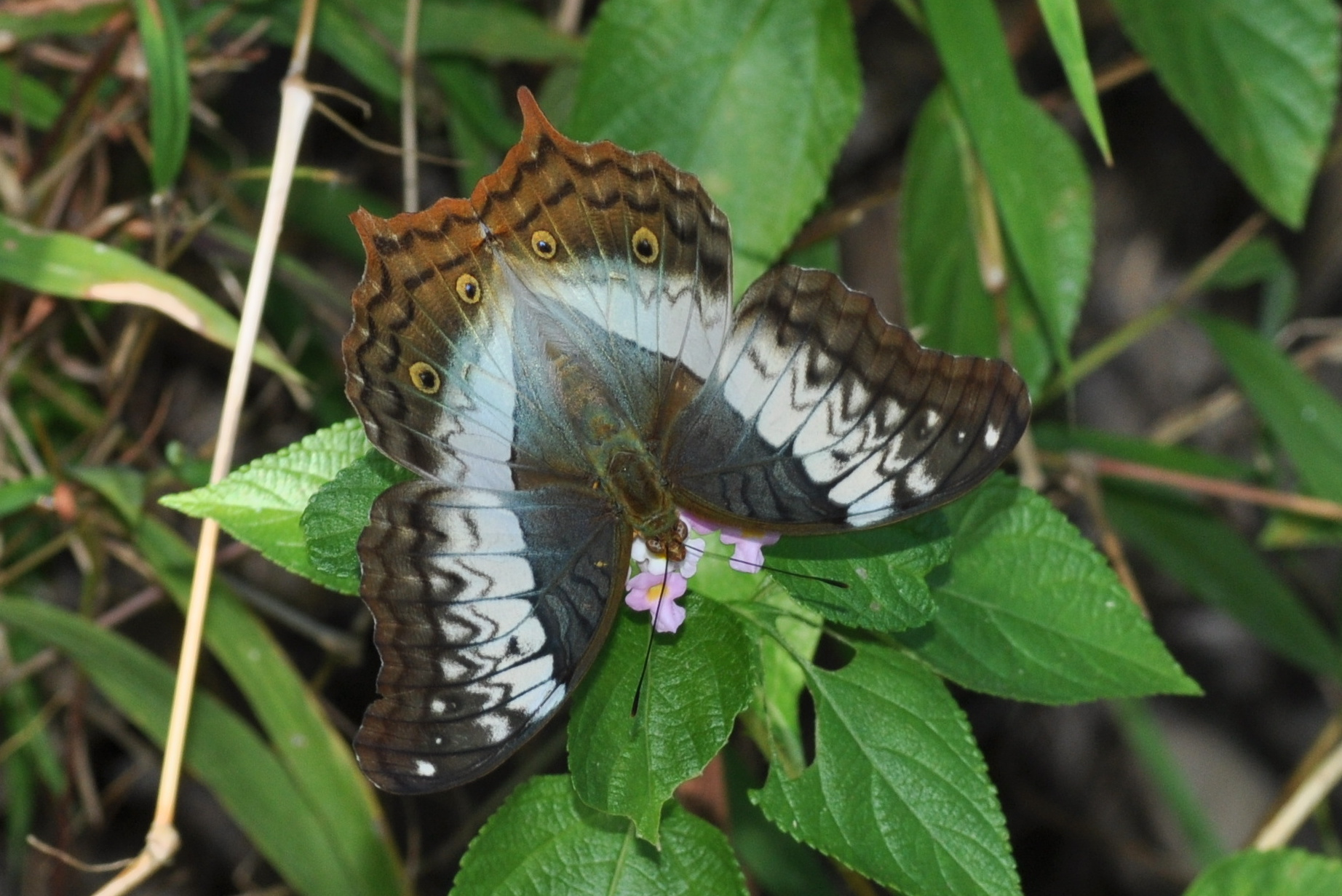
- Female

Scientific classification
- Kingdom: Animalia
- Phylum: Arthropoda
- Class: Insecta
- Order: Lepidoptera
- Family: Nymphalidae
- Genus: Vindula
- Species: V. erota

Binomial name
- Vindula erota (Fabricius, 1793)

Synonyms
- Cynthia erota

= Vindula erota =

Cruiser

Species of butterfly

Vindula erota, the common cruiser, is a species of nymphalid butterfly found in forested areas of tropical South Asia and Southeast Asia.

== Description ==
=== Wet-season form ===
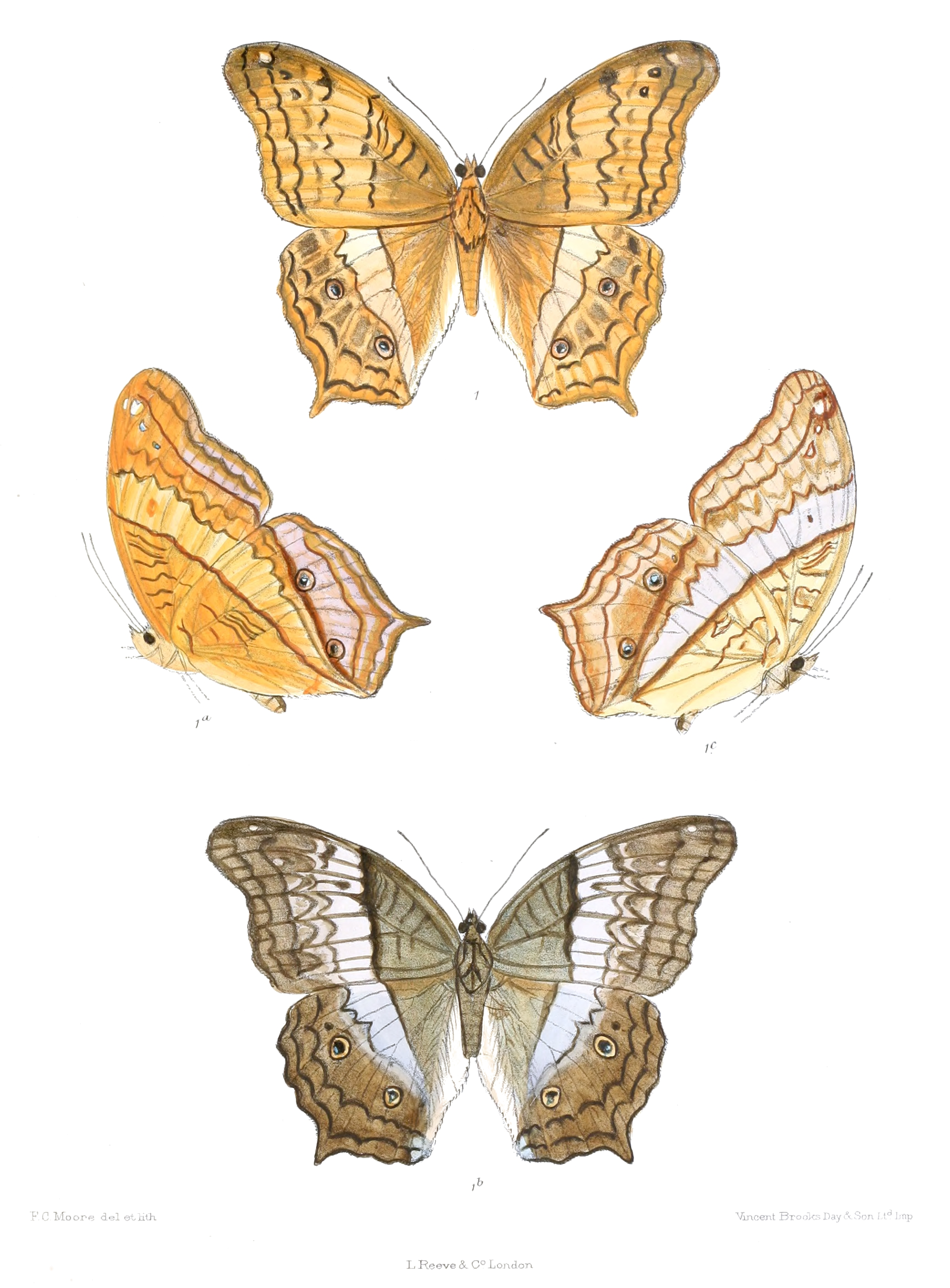
Wet-season form

Male upperside bright orange yellow. Forewing olivaceous brown at base with the following black markings: three short sinuous transverse lines across the cell; the discocellulars with an inner and outer slender line; a lunular inner discal broken transverse line, a zigzag outer discal broken transverse line, a transverse inwardly curved series of postdiscal spots, those in interspaces 5 and 6 the largest, and an inner and an outer subterminal conspicuous zigzag narrow band. Hindwing with inner and outer discal black lines and inner and outer subterminal narrow black bands as on the forewing, but the outer discal transverse line faint and ill-defined posteriorly; the space anteriorly between the two discal lines much paler yellow than the general ground colour; in addition there is a dark straight postdiscal diffuse fascia with a superposed ocellus in interspaces 2 and 5 respectively, and a lilac spot at the tornal angle. Underside similar, the basal area enclosed by the inner discal line suffused with cinnabar-red, as is also the outer zigzag transverse ill-defined discal line. Forewing with, in addition, two cream-white preapical spots and a purplish suffusion between the two subterminal lines, the inner line straight, not zigzag; interspace 1a, and 1 posteriorly from base to inner subterminal line, paler than the ground colour. Hindwing with some additional transverse linear and loop-like slender black markings at base; a conspicuous, straight, transverse, narrow dark ferruginous postdiscal band, and a pale purplish suffusion beyond it between veins 2 and 5, not reaching the termen. Antennae dark ferruginous; head, thorax and abdomen olivaceous orange; beneath, the palpi, thorax and abdomen ochraceous.

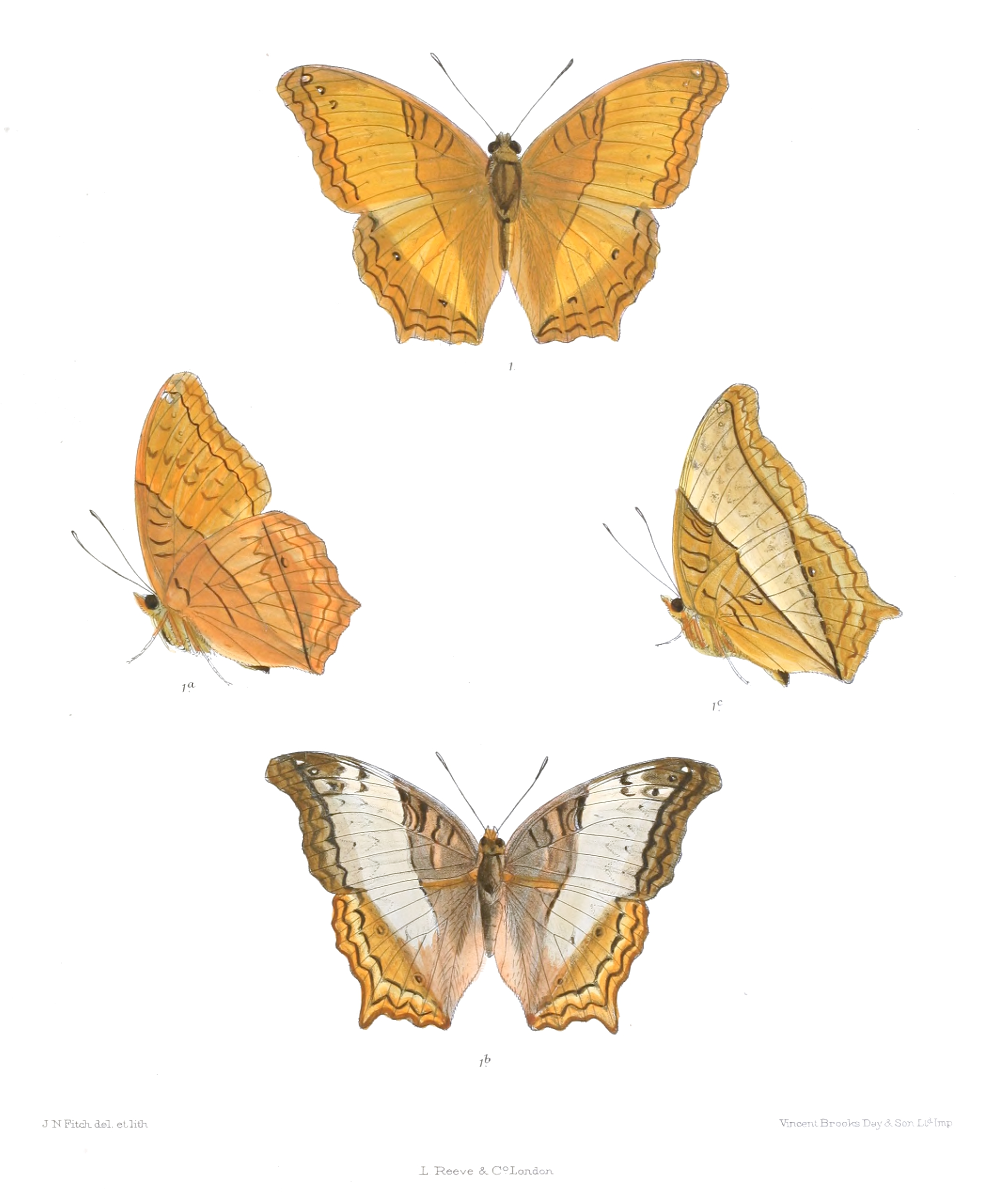
Dry-season form

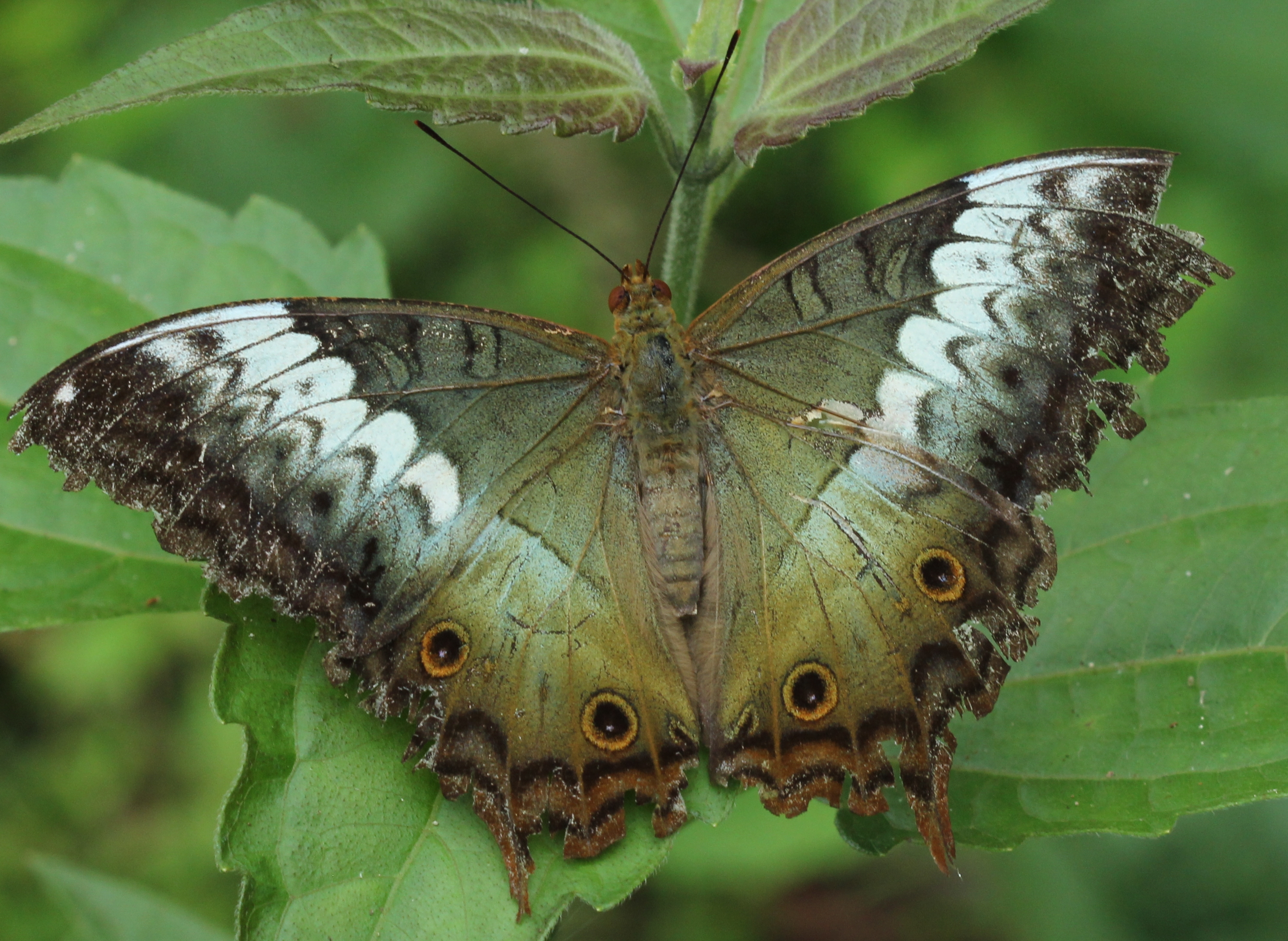
Female wet-season form

Female upperside dull brown, the basal area of both forewings and hindwings, on the inner side of a vertical transverse line from just beyond apex of cell in forewing to vein 2 on the hindwing, suffused with olivaceous green; the terminal margin, broadly, of the hindwing suffused with reddish ochraceous; a broad, posteriorly narrowing, discal white band inclined obliquely inwards from below the costa of the forewing to vein 2 on the hindwing, conspicuously interrupted and crossed by the dark veins on the forewing. Forewing with the following dusky brownish-black markings: three short transverse sinuous lines crossing the cell; a sinuous line on either side of the discocellulars; a broad line, interrupted by the veins, defining the inner side of the white discal band; a zigzag medial transverse line and a transverse series of very diffuse spots traversing the same band, followed by a postdiscal narrow band and a zigzag subterminal line; finally, a conspicuous white preapical spot in interspace 7. Hindwing: a dusky-brown zigzag line along the outer margin of the white discal band; a diffuse broad postdiscal transverse shading, bearing a white-centred, dusky-brown, ochraceous-ringed ocellus, in interspaces 2 and 5 respectively, followed by an inner subterminal lunular band and an outer subterminal zigzag line of brownish black; the abdominal fold ochraceous. Underside very similar to that in the male, but differs as follows: ground colour ochraceous yellow, the basal area on both forewings and hindwings darker ochraceous without any tinge of cinnabar-red; all the markings similar as to form to those in the male, but chestnut-brown; the ocelli on the hindwing larger, but otherwise similar. Antennae dark ochraceous, turning to brownish black on the apical half; palpi ochraceous; head, thorax and abdomen olivaceous green; beneath, the palpi, thorax and abdomen pale ochraceous.

=== Dry-season form ===
Smaller than the wet-season form, the tail at apex of vein 4 in the hindwing very much shorter as a rule.

Male: Upper and undersides similar to those in the wet-season form, but the ground colour very much paler; on the underside entirely suffused with pale cinnabar-red; the markings smaller, often more or less obsolescent, always more faintly defined; above, the markings are dusky brownish black, beneath pale chestnut-red; the pale purplish suffusion on the terminal margins of both forewings and hindwings on the underside, so conspicuous in the wet-season form, entirely wanting.

Female: Differs very remarkably from the wet-season form. Upperside: forewings and hindwings with a very broad pale ochraceous-white discal band from costa of forewing to the dorsal margin just above the tornus on the hindwing, narrowing posteriorly on the latter wing. Forewing: basal area olivaceous green on the inner side of the discal band, as in the wet-season form, but the space between the outer two of the three dusky transverse lines crossing the cell ochraceous: the medial zigzag line and the series of diffuse spots traversing the discal band very ill-defined. Hindwing: basal area ochraceous, owing to the colour of the underside showing through by transparency; a very pale shading of olivaceous green at base of cell; terminal portion of the wing beyond the discal band bright ochraceous; the postdiscal ocelli and the inner and outer subterminal dark lines as in the wet-season form.

Underside: ground colour pale yellow; the basal area on both forewings and hindwings suffused with cinnabar-red; the markings similar to those in the wet-season form, but very much fainter and paler. Antennae ochraceous, palpi and a line behind the eyes cinnabar-red; head, thorax and abdomen olivaceous green, beneath bright ochraceous.

== Distribution ==
Western Ghats (India), Northern India to Myanmar, Bangladesh, Thailand, Laos, Cambodia, Vietnam and southern China.

== See also ==
- List of butterflies of India (Nymphalidae)
