= Adenia cissampeloides =

Scientific classification
- Kingdom: Plantae
- Clade: Tracheophytes
- Clade: Angiosperms
- Clade: Eudicots
- Clade: Rosids
- Order: Malpighiales
- Family: Passifloraceae
- Genus: Adenia
- Species: A. cissampeloides

Binomial name
- Adenia cissampeloides (Planch. ex Hook.) Harms

Species of flowering plant

Adenia cissampeloides is a species of flowering plant in the passionflower family, Passifloraceae. It is native to tropical Africa.

== Description ==
Adenia cissampeloides is a woody vine that can reach up to 25 m (82 ft) in length. The stems are pale green to gray green and can be spotted. The leaves have smooth edges and are punctate (marked with dots), with a cordate (heart-shaped) to truncate (square) base. A. cissampeloides is monecious: it has unisexual flowers that occur in inflorescences. Male flowers have free or connate (fused together) filaments. Fruits are capsules with one to three fruits occurring per inflorescence.

== Taxonomy ==
It was first described in 1849 as Modecca cissampeloides. In 1897, it was moved to the genus Adenia.

== Distribution and habitat ==
Adenia cissampeloides is currently found naturally in rainforests, swamps, and savannas in Africa.

== Uses ==
It has several different human uses from medicine to consumption. Along with several other plants, it is used in Ghana in traditional medicines as a treatment for malaria. The leaves can be cooked and eaten as a vegetable.
