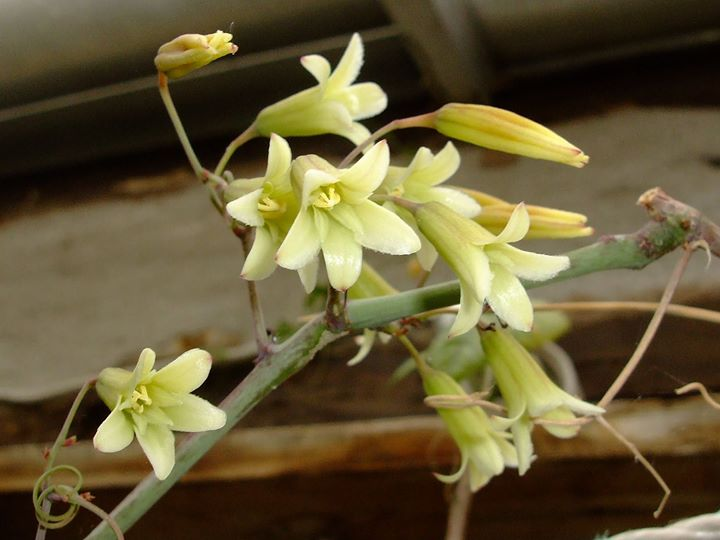

Scientific classification
- Kingdom: Plantae
- Clade: Tracheophytes
- Clade: Angiosperms
- Clade: Eudicots
- Clade: Rosids
- Order: Malpighiales
- Family: Passifloraceae
- Genus: Adenia
- Species: A. digitata

Binomial name
- Adenia digitata (Harv.) Engl.

Synonyms
- Adenia angustisecta Burtt Davy; Adenia multiflora Potts; Adenia senensis (Klotzsch) Engl.; Adenia stenophylla Harms; Clemanthus senensis Klotzsch; Modecca digitata Harv.; Modecca senensis (Klotzsch) Mast.

= Adenia digitata =

Finger-leaved granadilla

Species of plant

Adenia digitata is a species of flowering plant in the passionflower family, Passifloraceae. It is a climbing geophyte, from 0.2 to 3 meters long, which grows from a tuber. It is native to southern and eastern Africa, from Tanzania and Angola to the Northern Provinces and KwaZulu-Natal in South Africa.
