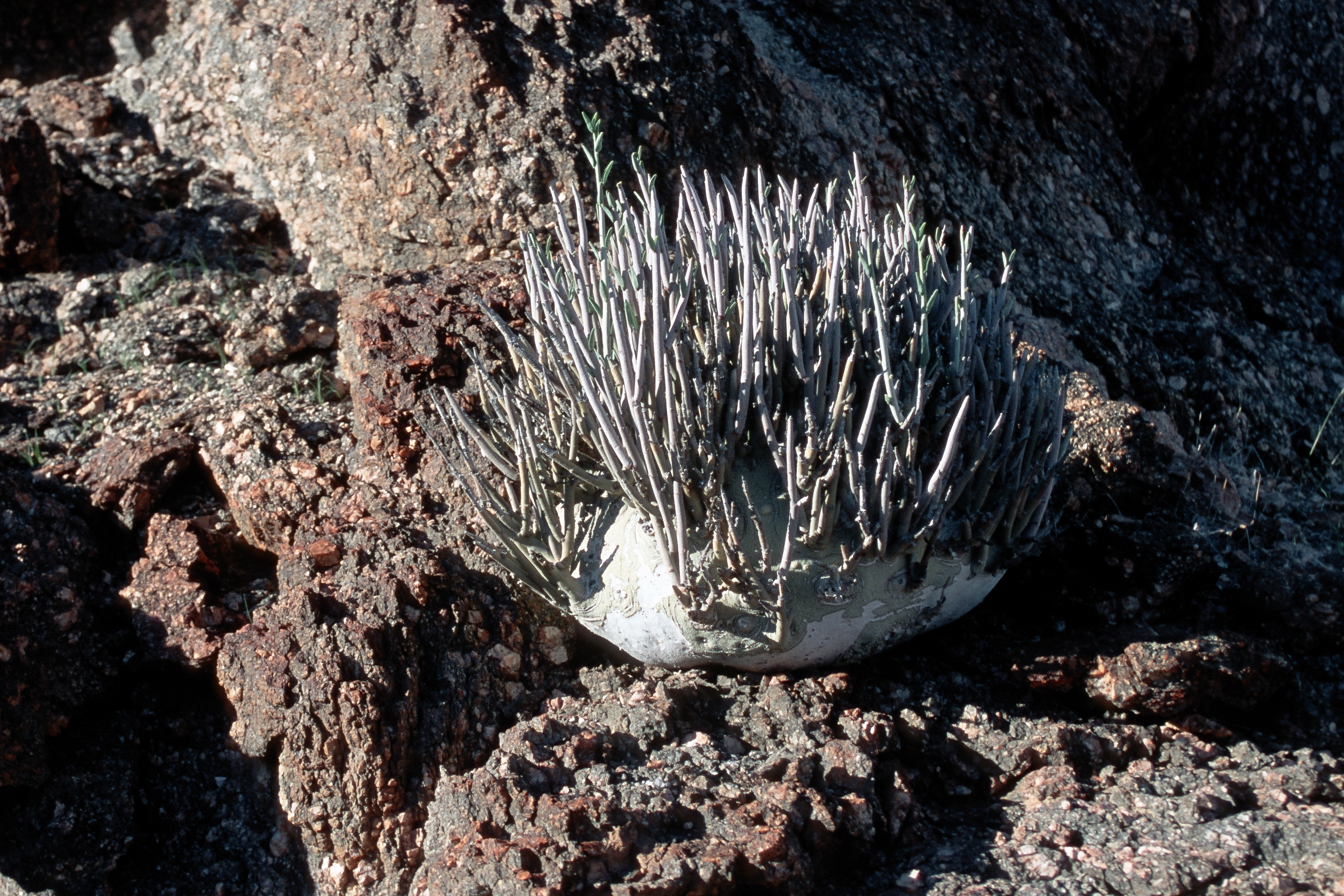
- Adenia pechuelii

Scientific classification
- Kingdom: Plantae
- Clade: Embryophytes
- Clade: Tracheophytes
- Clade: Spermatophytes
- Clade: Angiosperms
- Clade: Eudicots
- Clade: Rosids
- Order: Malpighiales
- Family: Passifloraceae
- Subfamily: Passifloroideae
- Tribe: Passifloreae
- Genus: Adenia; Forssk.

Species
- about 100, see text

Synonyms
- Blepharanthes Sm., nom. inval.; Clemanthus Klotzsch; Echinothamnus Engl.; Erythrocarpus M.Roem.; Jaeggia Schinz; Keramanthus Hook.f.; Kolbia P.Beauv.; Machadoa Welw. ex Hook.f.; Microblepharis (Wight & Arn.) M.Roem.; Modecca Lam.; Ophiocaulon Hook.f.; Paschanthus Burch.

= Adenia =

Genus of plants

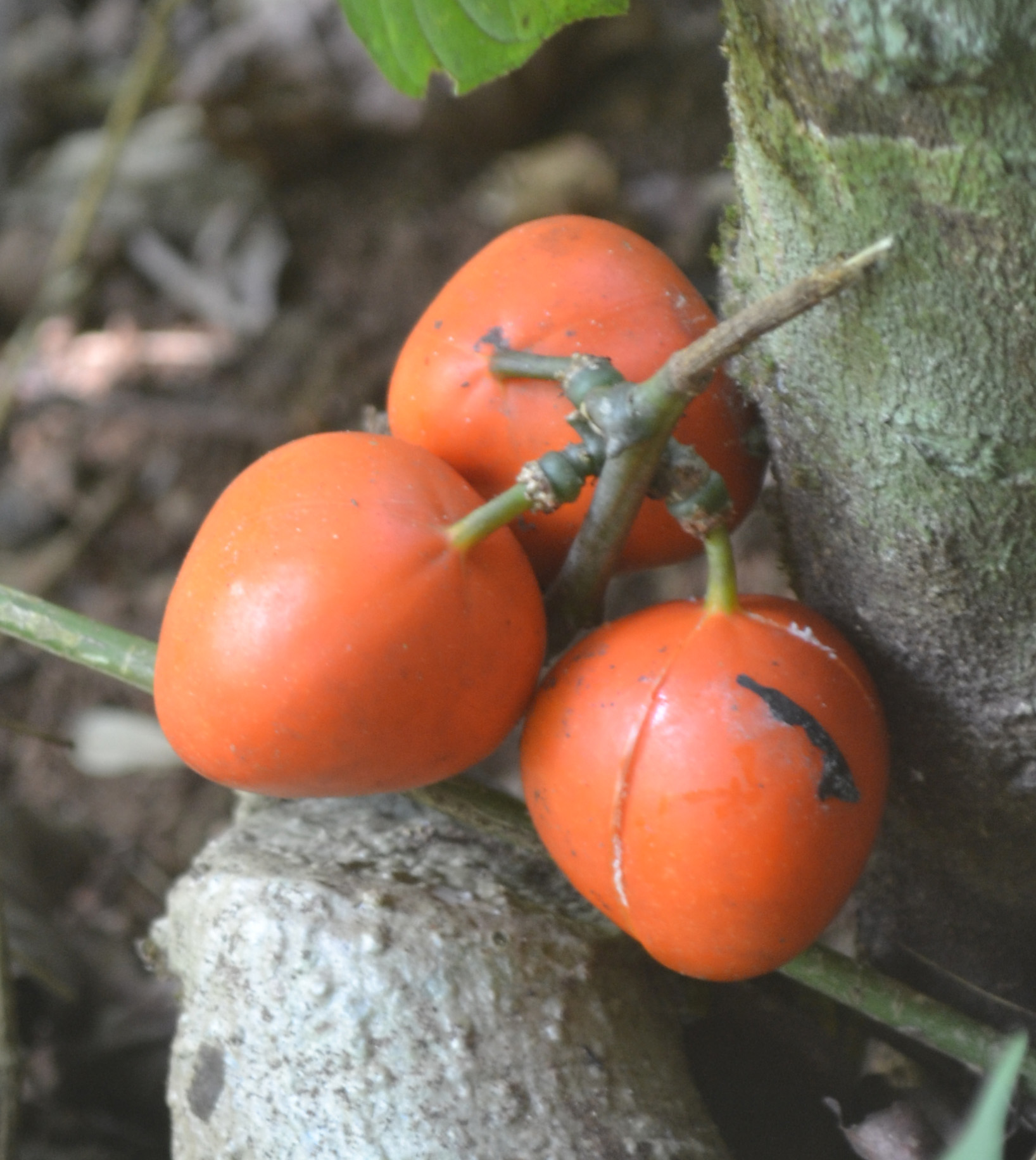
Adenia hondala

Adenia is a genus of flowering plants in the passionflower family Passifloraceae. It contains about 100 species distributed in the Old World tropics and subtropics. The centers of diversity are in Madagascar, eastern and western tropical Africa, and Southeast Asia. The genus name Adenia comes from "aden", reported as the Arabic name for the plant by Peter Forsskål, the author of the genus.

== Description ==
All Adenia are perennial plants, but there are many different forms, including herbs, vines, shrubs, and trees. Many are succulents and some are pachycauls. Some have fibrous root systems and some have tubers. Adenia can be found in a wide variety of habitat types, from dry African deserts to wet Southeast Asian rainforests. There are about 100 species in the genus.

Adenia have alternately arranged leaves borne on petioles. There are two glands located near the attachment of the leaf blade to the petiole. Most species are dioecious. Inflorescences of a few to many flowers occur in the leaf axils. There is a stipe below the flower. The calyx has five lobes and the five petals are usually smaller than the sepals and may be whitish or greenish. The male flower has five stamens. In the female flower these are reduced to staminodes. There are three styles tipped with stigmas that may be long-hairy to very woolly. The fruit is a red capsule. Each black seed has a fleshy aril.

Adenia species can be difficult to identify and distinguish as individuals of a species can be variable. One plant can have leaves of varying shapes and sizes, and young and old specimens can have different leaf types. Some taxa are poorly represented in herbarium collections, leaving few examples to compare with new specimens. Records of some taxa lack descriptions of both (i.e. male and female) flower types. Many species only flower for a few weeks, and during this time they may also lose their leaves. Succulent plants can be difficult to properly collect and preserve.

== Cytology ==
The chromosome count of Adenia is 2n = 24 or 2n = 48.

== Uses ==
Several species are used in traditional African medicine. Various parts of A. cissampeloides are used to treat many conditions, including gastrointestinal problems, inflammation, pain, fever, malaria, leprosy, scabies, cholera, anemia, bronchitis, sexually transmitted diseases, menorrhagia, and mental illness. It is used both as an abortifacient and to prevent miscarriage. A. dinklagei leaves are ingested to treat palpitations. The leaves of A. tricostata are used to treat fever. The leaves or leaf sap of A. bequaertii are taken to treat headache, mental illness, and possession. A. lobata stems are applied to sites of Guinea worm infection during extraction of the worm. It is also used as an enema and an aphrodisiac.

A. cissampeloides is used as a fish poison and arrow poison. The red-colored sap is used as a cosmetic. The stems can be made into rope. The crushed twigs or smoke from burning roots can be used to calm honeybees during honey harvest.

The leaves of A. cissampeloides are eaten as a vegetable in parts of Africa.

A. digitata is cultivated as an ornamental plant for its very large, distinctive aboveground tuber.

== Toxicity ==
Many Adenia are poisonous. They contain lectins such as lanceolin, stenodactylin, and volkensin, which are toxic to cells. They cause apoptosis, hemagglutination, inhibition of protein synthesis, and depurination of ribosomes and DNA. Mouse experiments with small doses of lanceolin and stenodactylin, from A. lanceolata and A. stenodactyla, respectively, revealed that they are "amongst the most potent toxins of plant origin".

The fruit of A. digitata has been used in Africa to commit homicide and suicide.

== Species ==
The following is a list of all 105 species in this genus that are accepted by Plants of the World Online as of February 2026

- Adenia aculeata (Oliv. ex Hook.) Engl.
- Adenia acuta W.J.de Wilde
- Adenia adenifera W.J.de Wilde
- Adenia angulosa G.W.Hu & Q.F.Wang
- Adenia antongilliana (Tul.) Schinz
- Adenia ballyi Verdc.
- Adenia banaensis C.Cusset
- Adenia barthelatii M.Pignal, Yockteng, Hearn & Labat
- Adenia bequaertii Robyns & Lawalrée
- Adenia boivinii W.J.de Wilde
- Adenia cardiophylla (Mast.) Engl.
- Adenia cissampeloides (Planch. ex Hook.) Harms
- Adenia cladosepala (Baker) Harms
- Adenia cordifolia (Blume) Engl.
- Adenia crassa Merr.
- Adenia cynanchifolia (Benth.) Harms
- Adenia densiflora (Baker) Harms
- Adenia digitata (Harv.) Engl.
- Adenia dinklagei Hutch. & Dalziel
- Adenia dolichosiphon Harms
- Adenia ecirrosa W.J.de Wilde
- Adenia elegans H.Perrier
- Adenia ellenbeckii Harms
- Adenia epigea H.Perrier
- Adenia erecta W.J.de Wilde
- Adenia fasciculata W.J.de Wilde
- Adenia fernandesiana A.Robyns
- Adenia firingalavensis (Drake ex Jum.) Harms
- Adenia fruticosa Burtt Davy
- Adenia gedoensis W.J.de Wilde
- Adenia glauca Schinz
- Adenia globosa Engl.
- Adenia goetzei Harms
- Adenia gracilis Harms
- Adenia gummifera (Harv.) Harms
- Adenia hastata (Harv.) Schinz
- Adenia heterophylla (Blume) Koord.
- Adenia hondala (Gaertn.) W.J.de Wilde
- Adenia huillensis (Welw.) A.Fernald & R.Fernald
- Adenia inermis (W.J.de Wilde) W.J.de Wilde
- Adenia isaloensis (H.Perrier) W.J.de Wilde
- Adenia karibaensis W.J.de Wilde
- Adenia keramanthus Harms
- Adenia kigogoensis Hearn
- Adenia kinabaluensis W.J.de Wilde
- Adenia kirkii (Mast.) Engl.
- Adenia lanceolata Engl.
- Adenia lapiazicola Bard.-Vauc.
- Adenia latipetala W.J.de Wilde
- Adenia letouzeyi W.J.de Wilde
- Adenia lewallei A.Robyns
- Adenia lindiensis Harms
- Adenia litoralis Hearn
- Adenia lobata (Jacq.) Engl.
- Adenia longistipulata W.J.de Wilde
- Adenia macrophylla (Blume) Koord.
- Adenia malangeana Harms
- Adenia mannii (Mast.) Engl.
- Adenia mcdadiana Hearn
- Adenia metamorpha Hearn
- Adenia metriosiphon W.J.de Wilde
- Adenia monadelpha H.Perrier
- Adenia mossambicensis W.J.de Wilde
- Adenia natalensis W.J.de Wilde
- Adenia olaboensis Claverie
- Adenia ovata W.J.de Wilde
- Adenia pachyphylla W.J.de Wilde
- Adenia panduriformis Engl.
- Adenia pechuelii (Engl.) Harms
- Adenia peltata (Baker) Schinz
- Adenia penangiana (Wall. ex G.Don) W.J.de Wilde
- Adenia perrieri Clavaud
- Adenia pierrei Gagnep.
- Adenia pinnatisecta (Craib) Craib
- Adenia poggei (Engl.) Engl.
- Adenia poilanei C.Cusset
- Adenia pulchra M.G.Gilbert & W.J.de Wilde
- Adenia pyromorpha (H.Perrier) W.J.de Wilde
- Adenia racemosa W.J.de Wilde
- Adenia refracta (Tul.) Schinz
- Adenia repanda (Burch.) Engl.
- Adenia reticulata (De Wild. & T.Durand) Engl.
- Adenia rumicifolia Engl. & Harms
- Adenia schliebenii Harms
- Adenia schweinfurthii Engl.
- Adenia sphaerocarpa Clavaud
- Adenia spinosa Burtt Davy
- Adenia staudtii Harms
- Adenia stenodactyla Harms
- Adenia stolzii Harms
- Adenia stricta (Mast.) Engl.
- Adenia stylosa (H.Perrier) Hearn
- Adenia subsessilifolia H.Perrier
- Adenia tisserantii A.Fernald & R.Fernald
- Adenia tricostata W.J.de Wilde
- Adenia trilobata (Roxb.) Engl.
- Adenia trisecta (Mast.) Engl.
- Adenia tuberifera R.E.Fr.
- Adenia venenata Forssk.
- Adenia viridiflora Craib
- Adenia volkensii Harms
- Adenia welwitschii (Mast.) Engl.
- Adenia wightiana (Wall. ex Wight & Arn.) Engl.
- Adenia wilmsii Harms
- Adenia zambesiensis R.Fern. & A.Fern.
