= Dioecy =

Having distinct male and female organisms

Illustrates dioecy in flowering plants: a mix of all-male (blue) and all-female (pink) individuals.

Dioecy (from Ancient Greek διοικία (dioikía) 'two households'; adj. dioecious) is a characteristic of species that have distinct unisexual individuals, each producing either male or female gametes, either directly (in animals) or indirectly (in seed plants). Dioecious reproduction is biparental reproduction. Dioecy has costs, since only the females directly produce offspring. It is a way to prevent self-fertilization and promote allogamy (outcrossing), and thus tends to reduce the expression of recessive deleterious mutations. Plants have several other ways to prevent self-fertilization including, for example, dichogamy, herkogamy, and self-incompatibility.

== In zoology ==
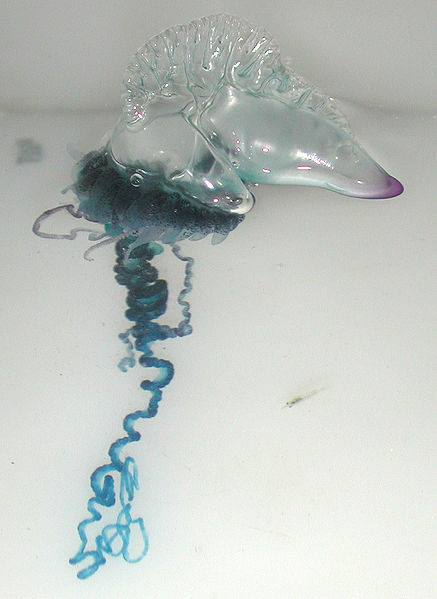
Physalia physalis, Portuguese man o' war, is a dioecious colonial marine animal; the reproductive medusae within the colony are all of the same sex.

In zoology, dioecy means that an individual of an animal species may be either male or female, in which case the synonym gonochory is more often used. Most animal species are gonochoric, almost all vertebrate species are gonochoric, and all bird and mammal species are gonochoric. Dioecy may also describe colonies within an animal species, such as the colonies of Siphonophorae (Portuguese man-of-war), which may be either dioecious or monoecious.

== In botany ==
Land plants (embryophytes) differ from animals in that their life cycle involves alternation of generations. In animals, typically an individual produces gametes of one kind, either sperm or egg cells. The gametes have half the number of chromosomes of the individual producing them, so are haploid. Without further dividing, a sperm and an egg cell fuse to form a zygote that develops into a new individual. In land plants, by contrast, one generation – the sporophyte generation – consists of individuals that produce haploid spores rather than haploid gametes. Spores do not fuse, but germinate by dividing repeatedly by mitosis to give rise to haploid multicellular individuals, the gametophytes, which produce gametes. A male gamete and a female gamete then fuse to produce a new diploid sporophyte.

Alternation of generations in plants: the sporophyte generation produces spores that give rise to the gametophyte generation, which produces gametes that fuse to give rise to a new sporophyte generation.

In bryophytes (mosses, liverworts and hornworts), the gametophytes are fully independent plants. Seed plant gametophytes are dependent on the sporophyte and develop within the spores, a condition known as endospory. In flowering plants, the male gametophytes develop within pollen grains produced by the sporophyte's stamens, and the female gametophytes develop within ovules produced by the sporophyte's carpels.

The sporophyte generation of a seed plant is called "monoecious" when each sporophyte plant has both kinds of spore-producing organ but in separate flowers or cones. For example, a single flowering plant of a monoecious species has both functional stamens and carpels, in separate flowers.

The sporophyte generation of seed plants is called dioecious when each sporophyte plant has only one kind of spore-producing organ, all of whose spores give rise either to male gametophytes, which produce only male gametes (sperm), or to female gametophytes, which produce only female gametes (egg cells). For example, a single flowering plant sporophyte of a fully dioecious species like holly has either flowers with functional stamens producing pollen containing male gametes (staminate or 'male' flowers), or flowers with functional carpels producing female gametes (carpellate or 'female' flowers), but not both. There are other, more complex reproductive schemes such as gynodioecy and androdioecy.

Slightly different terms, dioicous and monoicous, may be used for the gametophyte generation of non-vascular plants, although dioecious and monoecious are also used. A dioicous gametophyte either produces only male gametes (sperm) or produces only female gametes (egg cells). About 60% of liverworts are dioicous.

Dioecy occurs in a wide variety of plant groups. Examples of dioecious plant species include willows, cannabis and African teak. As its specific name implies, the perennial stinging nettle Urtica dioica is dioecious, while the annual nettle Urtica urens is monoecious. Dioecious flora are predominant in tropical environments.

About 65% of gymnosperm species are dioecious, including ginkgo, all cycads and gnetophytes, most yews, podocarps, and araucarias, and many junipers, but almost all other conifers are monoecious. In some species, the situation is mixed; e.g. in Araucaria araucana and Pinus johannis most individuals are single-sex, but occasional individuals are monoecious, producing cones of both sexes. In gymnosperms, dioecy and monoecy are strongly correlated with the mode of seed dispersal; monoecious species are mostly wind dispersed (anemophily) and dioecious species animal-dispersed (zoophily).

About 6% of Angiosperm species are entirely dioecious and about 7% of angiosperm genera contain some dioecious species. Dioecy is more common in woody plants, and heterotrophic species. In most dioecious plants, whether male or female gametophytes are produced is determined genetically, but in some cases it can be determined by the environment, as in Arisaema species. In the largely monoecious order Fagales, a few species are dioecious or largely so, but with variation; the shrub Myrica gale is typically dioecious but some individuals are monoecious, and others have been known to change sex from one year to another.

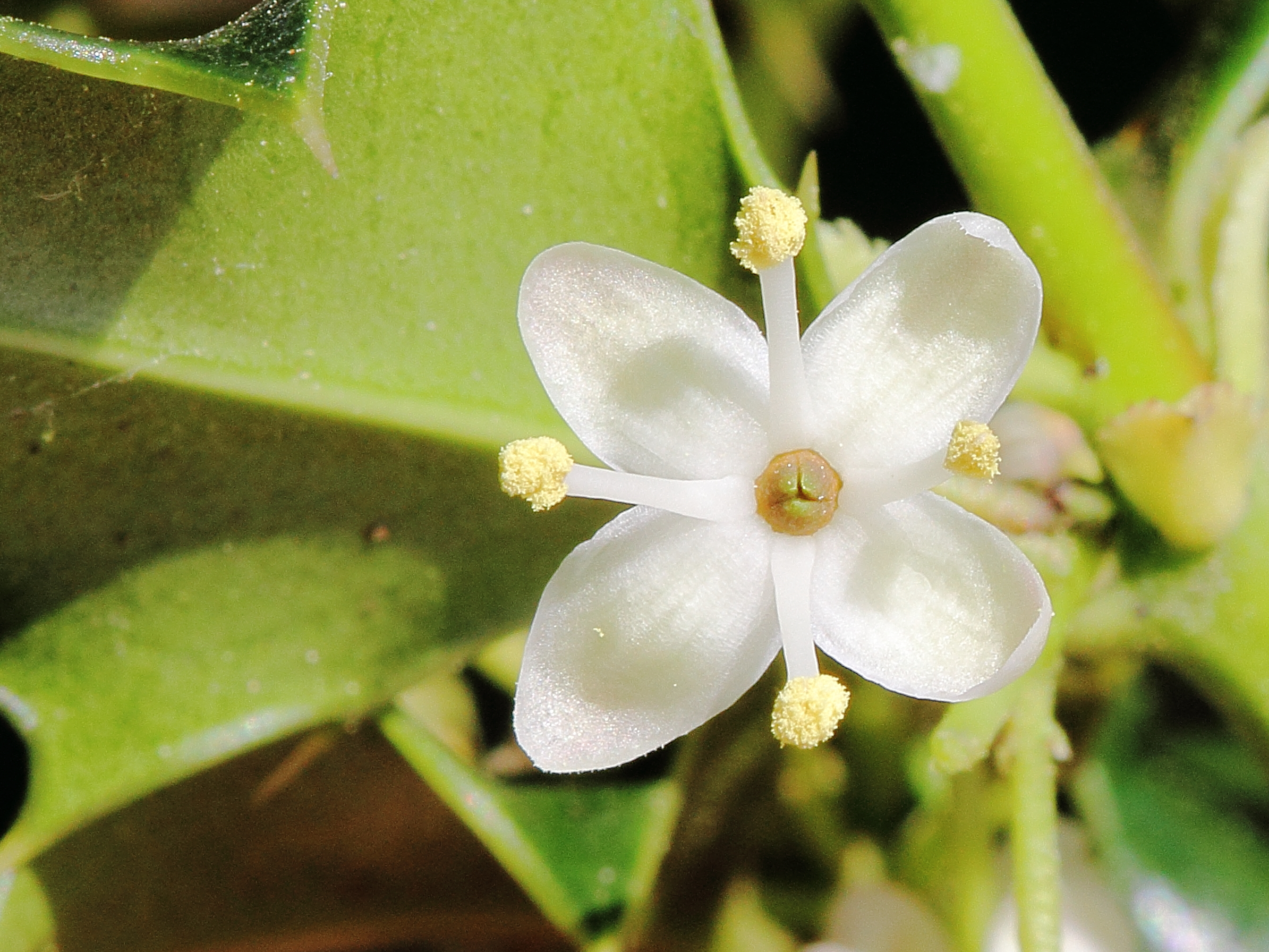
In dioecious holly, some plants only have 'male' flowers with stamens producing pollen.

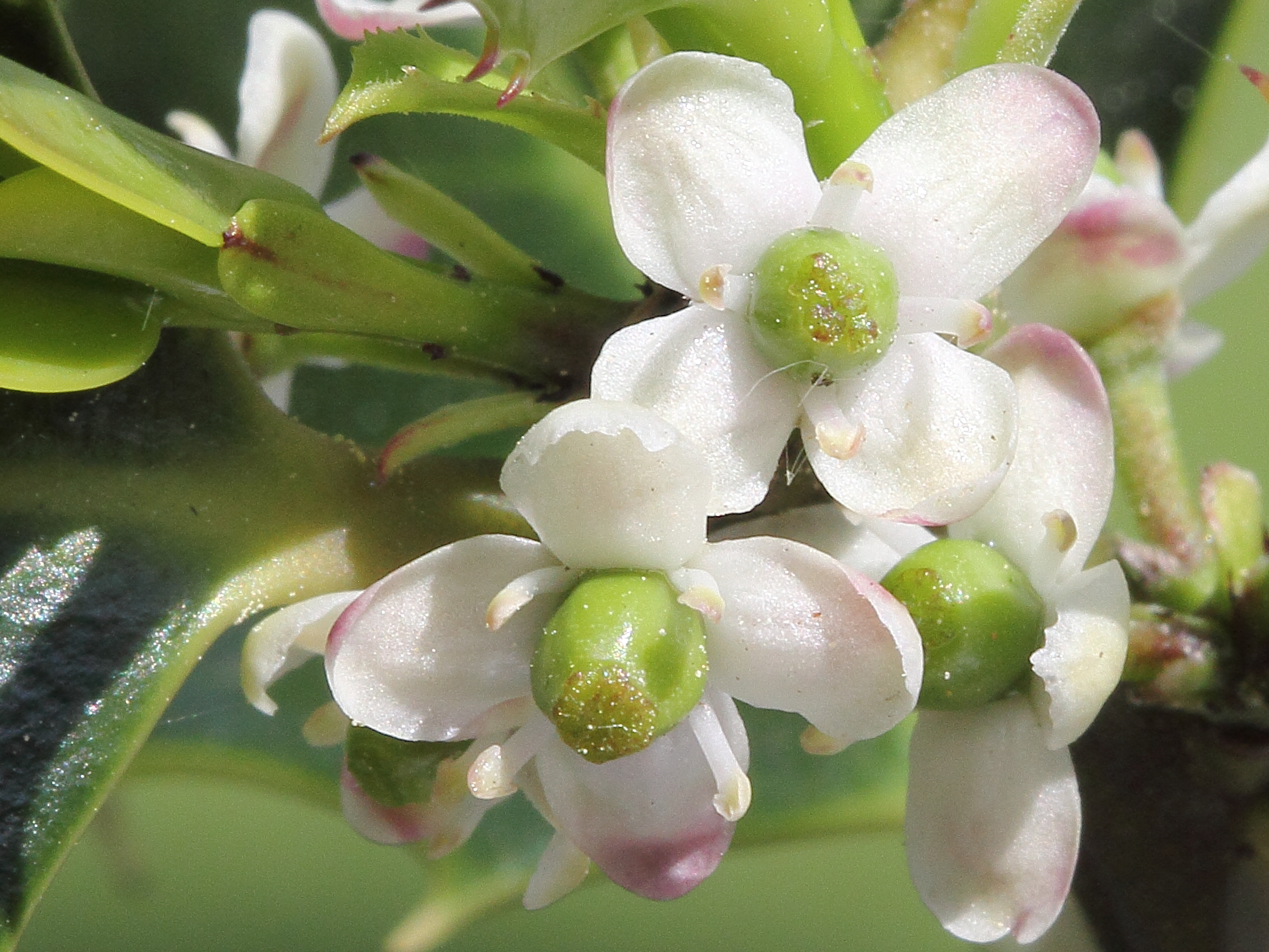
Other holly plants only have 'female' flowers that produce ovules.

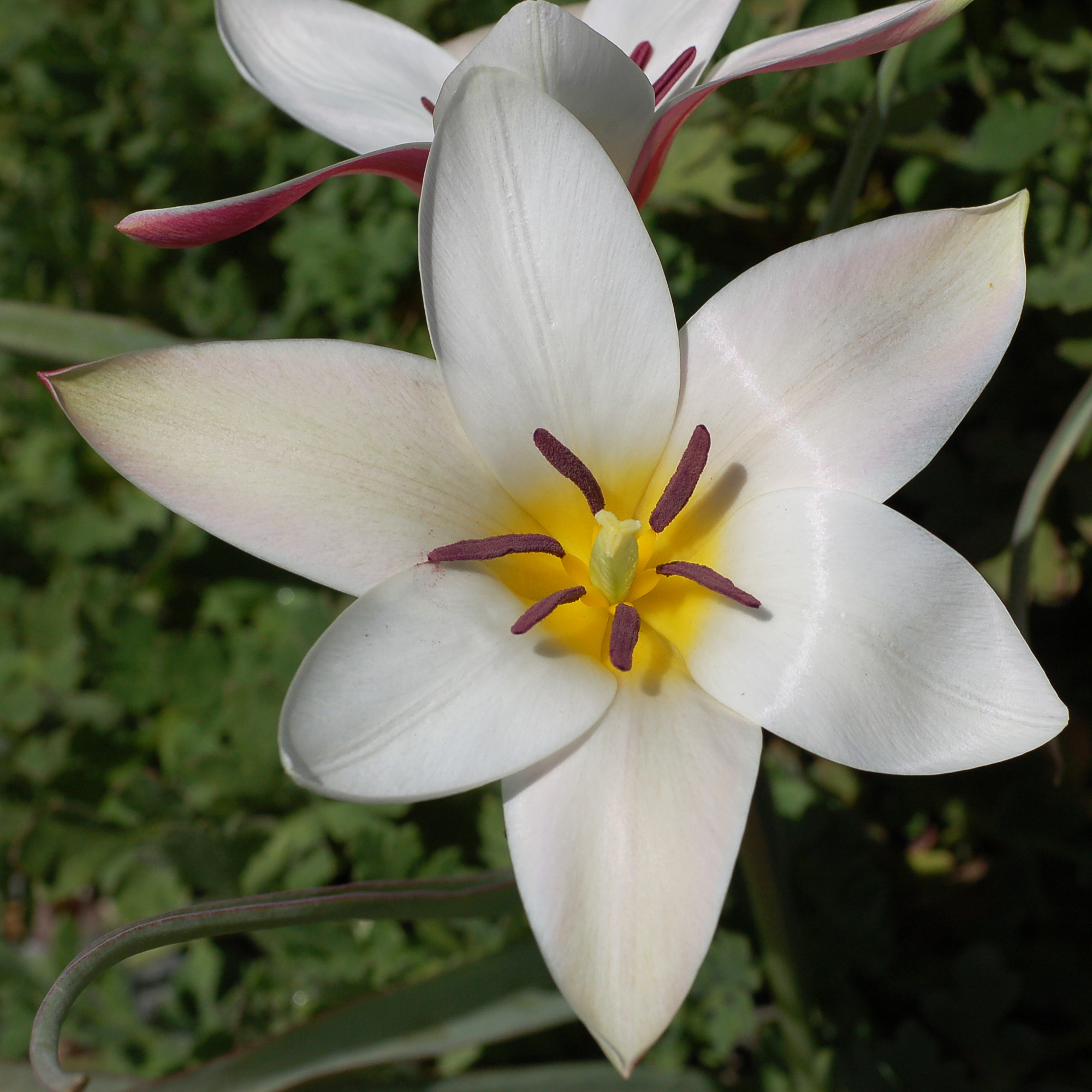
Each bisexual (perfect) tulip flower has both stamens and carpels.

Certain algae, such as some species of Polysiphonia, are dioecious. Dioecy is prevalent in the brown algae (Phaeophyceae) and may have been the ancestral state in that group.

=== Evolution of dioecy ===
In plants, dioecy has evolved independently multiple times either from hermaphroditic species or from monoecious species. A previously untested hypothesis is that this reduces inbreeding; dioecy has been shown to be associated with increased genetic diversity and greater protection against deleterious mutations. Regardless of the evolutionary pathway, the intermediate states need to have fitness advantages compared to monoecy.

Dioecy evolves due to male or female sterility, though it is unlikely that mutations for male and female sterility occurred at the same time. In angiosperms unisexual flowers evolve from bisexual ones. Dioecy occurs in almost half of plant families, but only in a minority of genera, suggesting recent evolution. For 160 families that have dioecious species, dioecy is thought to have evolved more than 100 times.

In the family Caricaceae, dioecy is likely the ancestral system.

==== From monoecy ====
Dioecious flowering plants can evolve from monoecious ancestors that had flowers containing both functional stamens and functional carpels. Some authors argue monoecy and dioecy are related.

In the genus Sagittaria, since there is a distribution of sexual systems, it has been postulated that dioecy evolved from monoecy through gynodioecy mainly from mutations that resulted in male sterility. However, since the ancestral state is unclear, more work is needed to clarify the evolution of dioecy via monoecy.

==== From hermaphroditism ====
Dioecy usually evolves from hermaphroditism through gynodioecy but may also evolve through androdioecy, through distyly or through heterostyly. In the Asteraceae, dioecy may have evolved independently from hermaphroditism at least 5 or 9 times. The reverse transition, from dioecy back to hermaphroditism has also been observed, both in Asteraceae and in bryophytes, with a frequency about half of that for the forward transition.

In Silene, since there is no monoecy, it is suggested that dioecy evolved through gynodioecy.

== In mycology ==
Very few dioecious fungi have been discovered.

Monoecy and dioecy in fungi refer to the donor and recipient roles in mating, where a nucleus is transferred from one haploid hypha to another, and the two nuclei then present in the same cell merge by karyogamy to form a zygote. The definition avoids reference to male and female reproductive structures, which are rare in fungi. An individual of a dioecious fungal species not only requires a partner for mating, but performs only one of the roles in nuclear transfer, as either the donor or the recipient. A monoecious fungal species can perform both roles, but may not be self-compatible.

== Adaptive benefit ==
Dioecy has a disadvantage compared with monoecy: only about half of adults produce offspring. Dioecious species must therefore have fitness advantages to compensate for this cost through increased survival, growth, or reproduction. Dioecy excludes self-fertilization and promotes allogamy (outcrossing), and thus tends to reduce the expression of recessive deleterious mutations present in a population. In trees, compensation is realized mainly through increased seed production by females. This in turn is facilitated by a lower contribution of reproduction to population growth, which results in no demonstrable net costs of having males in the population compared to being hermaphroditic. Dioecy may also accelerate or retard lineage diversification in angiosperms. Dioecious lineages are more diversified in certain genera, but less in others. An analysis suggested that dioecy neither consistently places a strong brake on diversification, nor strongly drives it.

== See also ==
- Gonochorism
- Hermaphrodite
- Plant reproductive morphology
- Self-incompatibility in plants
- Sexual dimorphism
- Trioecy

== Bibliography ==
- Beentje, Henk (2010). The Kew Plant Glossary. Richmond, Surrey: Royal Botanic Gardens, Kew. ISBN 978-1-84246-422-9.
- Mauseth, James D. (2014). Botany: An Introduction to Plant Biology (5th ed.). Sudbury, MA: Jones and Bartlett Learning. ISBN 978-1-4496-6580-7.
