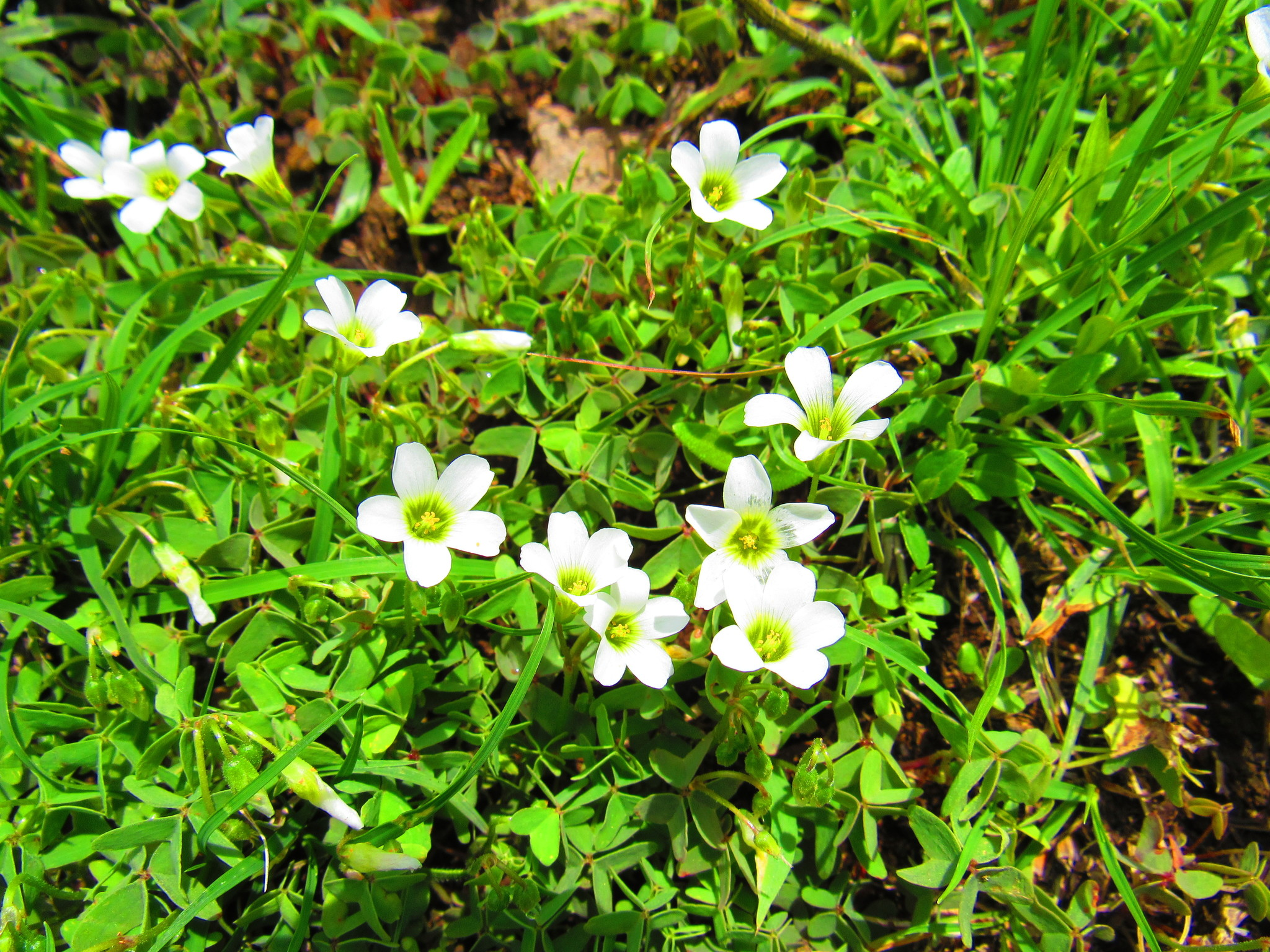

Scientific classification
- Kingdom: Plantae
- Clade: Embryophytes
- Clade: Tracheophytes
- Clade: Angiosperms
- Clade: Eudicots
- Clade: Rosids
- Order: Oxalidales
- Family: Oxalidaceae
- Genus: Oxalis
- Species: O. alpina

Binomial name
- Oxalis alpina (Rose) Rose ex R.Knuth

= Oxalis alpina =

Species of flowering plant

Oxalis alpina is a herbaceous perennial plant also known by its common name alpine woodsorrel. It is a species belonging to the genus Oxalis. O. alpina is found in North America and Central America from Guatemala to the southwestern United States.

== Taxonomy ==
Different classifications of Oxalis alpina exist. It is a species in the genus Oxalis, but some also classify it as being part of the Ionoxalis section in the genus Oxalis. Synonyms for Oxalis alpina include Ionoxalis alpina Rose, Ionoxalis metcalfei Small, Ionoxalis monticola Small, Oxalis metcalfei (Small) Knuth., Oxalis bulbosa A. Nelson, and Oxalis monticola Small. The species was first described by Reinhard Gustav Paul Knuth and Joseph Nelson Rose in 1919.

=== Etymology ===
The name Oxalis comes from the Greek word "oxys," meaning sharp or sour, which is in reference to its oxalic acid content that gives it a sour flavour. The specific epithet alpina means "alpine," reflecting its habitat range.

== Description ==
Oxalis alpina is a perennial herb that grows each year from an underground bulb, and can usually be found from July to September. Oxalis alpina is tetraploid. Plants are conspicuous and can have 1–7 flowers which are arranged in an umbel inflorescence. Leaves are green and clover-like with three distinct heart-shaped lobes. Oxalis alpina is morphologically similar to Oxalis violacea, but can be differentiated by observing the orange projections at sepal tips: Oxalis alpina has two distinct orange projections, while in Oxalis violacea the projections are fused.

Flowers from Oxalis alpina are perfect and exhibit a superior ovary, ten stamens, and one pistil composed of five carpels. Fruits from Oxalis alpina are dehiscent capsules which disperse seeds by exploding at maturation, projecting seeds into the immediate area. Oxalis alpina flowers are heterostylous and exhibit either tristyly or distyly depending on the population. Distylous populations likely evolved from tristylous ancestors, and pollen transfer can still occur between tristylous and distylous O. alpina flowers.

== Range ==
Occurrences of Oxalis alpina, have been recorded from Guatemala to the southwestern United States, including the sky island region of southeastern Arizona and northern Mexico. It is known to be somewhat rare in the United States, with few populations throughout New Mexico and only found in the eastern 2/3 of Arizona, as well as a few instances in Navajo County. Different populations are known to have varying reproduction systems, with isolated climate conditions occurring since the Pleistocene facilitating these differences even between adjacent mountain ranges within Arizona.

== Habitat ==
Oxalis alpina can be found at high altitudes in temperate deciduous, pine-oak, and temperate coniferous forests. Populations in Arizona are recorded as being located at elevations of 5500 to 9000 feet.Oxalis alpina usually grows among rocks in moist environments.

== Interspecies relationships ==
Oxalis alpina is pollinated by solitary bees (Heterosarus bakeri and Heterosarus neomexicanus), dipterans, wasps, and lepidoptera. In Mexico and the southern United States the bulbs of Oxalis alpina and other Oxalis species have been found to be a primary food source for Montezuma quail (Cyrtonyx montezumae) during the winter months.
