= Oxossia pernambucensis =

Scientific classification
- Kingdom: Plantae
- Clade: Tracheophytes
- Clade: Angiosperms
- Clade: Eudicots
- Clade: Rosids
- Order: Malpighiales
- Family: Passifloraceae
- Genus: Oxossia
- Species: O. pernambucensis

Binomial name
- Oxossia pernambucensis (Urb.) L.Rocha

Synonyms
- Turnera pernambucensis Urb.

Species of flowering plant

Oxossia pernambucensis is a shrub in the genus Oxossia (Passifloraceae). It is native to the Atlantic Rainforest of Brazil. The species is currently represented by a single population and thus is currently classified as critically endangered.

Similar to other members of the genus, O. pernambucensis has white distylous flowers. It flowers from May to January and seeds are dispersed by ants. Morphologically, it is similar to O. capitata and O. dasystla. It can be distinguished from other members of the genus by its fruit which are punctate and lack an apical horn-like appendix.
