= Oxossia waltherioides =

Scientific classification
- Kingdom: Plantae
- Clade: Tracheophytes
- Clade: Angiosperms
- Clade: Eudicots
- Clade: Rosids
- Order: Malpighiales
- Family: Passifloraceae
- Genus: Oxossia
- Species: O. waltherioides

Binomial name
- Oxossia waltherioides (Urb.) L.Rocha

Synonyms
- Turnera waltherioides Urb.

Species of flowering plant

Oxossia waltherioides is a subshrub in the genus Oxossia (Passifloraceae). It is native to the Amazon Rainforest of Roraima, Brazil.

== Description ==
Similar to other members of Oxossia, it has yellow distylous flowers. Morphologically, it's similar to O. schomburgkiana. It can be distinguished from other members of the genera due to its coriaceous ovate-elliptic leaves; unlike O. schomburgkiana, the entire leaf is tomentose.
