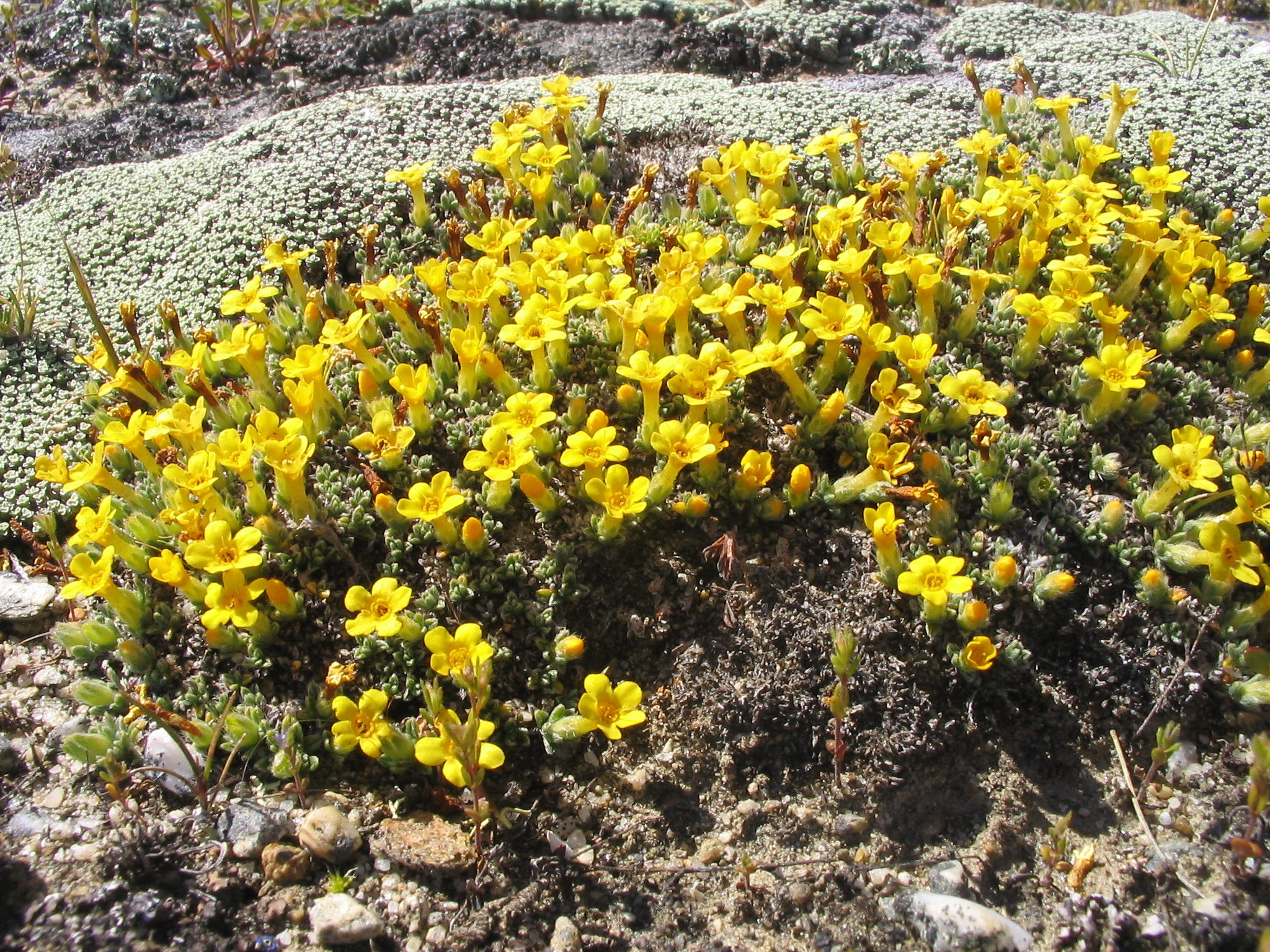
- Myosotis uniflora cushion in full flower

Conservation status
- Naturally Uncommon (NZ TCS)

Scientific classification
- Kingdom: Plantae
- Clade: Tracheophytes
- Clade: Angiosperms
- Clade: Eudicots
- Clade: Asterids
- Order: Boraginales
- Family: Boraginaceae
- Genus: Myosotis
- Species: M. uniflora

Binomial name
- Myosotis uniflora Hook.f.

= Myosotis uniflora =

Species of flowering plant

Myosotis uniflora is a species of flowering plant in the family Boraginaceae, endemic to the South Island of New Zealand. Joseph Dalton Hooker described the species in 1867. Plants of this species of forget-me-not are perennial with a prostrate, compact, cushion or mat habit, short bracteate inflorescences, and cream to yellow corollas.

M. uniflora is distributed among cushion-fields and river terraces in the Canterbury and Otago regions. It is listed as Naturally Uncommon by the New Zealand Threat Classification System.

== Description ==
Myosotis plants are compacted cushions or mats that can reach 50 cm in diameter. The many imbricate rosette leaves have petioles 1–4 mm long that are glabrous but with erect hairs on the edges. The rosette leaf blades are 1–4 mm long by about 1 mm wide (length: width ratio 1.4–4.1: 1), lanceolate to ovate or triangular, widest at or below the middle, with an acute apex. The upper and lower surfaces of the leaf are sparsely to densely covered in long, flexuous, appressed to patent, antrorse (forward-facing) hairs that are oriented parallel to the mid vein.

Each rosette has few prostrate to ascending, once-branched, bracteate inflorescences that are up to 60 mm long. The cauline leaves are similar to the rosette leaves but smaller. Each inflorescence has a solitary flower, borne on a short pedicel, with a bract. The calyx is 1–4 mm long at flowering and 2–5 mm long at fruiting, lobed to about half its length, and densely covered in long, antrorse, flexuous (rarely hooked at the calyx base), mostly appressed (few patent) hairs. The corolla is cream to yellow, 2–7 mm in diameter, with a cylindrical tube, petals that are obovate to very broadly obovate or ovate to very broadly ovate, and flat, and small yellow scales alternating with the petals. The anthers are usually fully included, or sometimes partially included with the tips only surpassing the scales. The four smooth, shiny, dark brown nutlets are 1.4–1.7 mm long by 0.8–1.4 mm wide and narrowly ovoid to broadly ovoid in shape.

M. uniflora has M. uniflora type pollen. The breeding system of Myosotis uniflora is outcrossing, as the flowers are 'always herkogamous', with a high pollen : ovule ratio.

It flowers and fruits from September–March, with the main flowering period October–January and the main fruiting period November–March.

=== Gallery ===
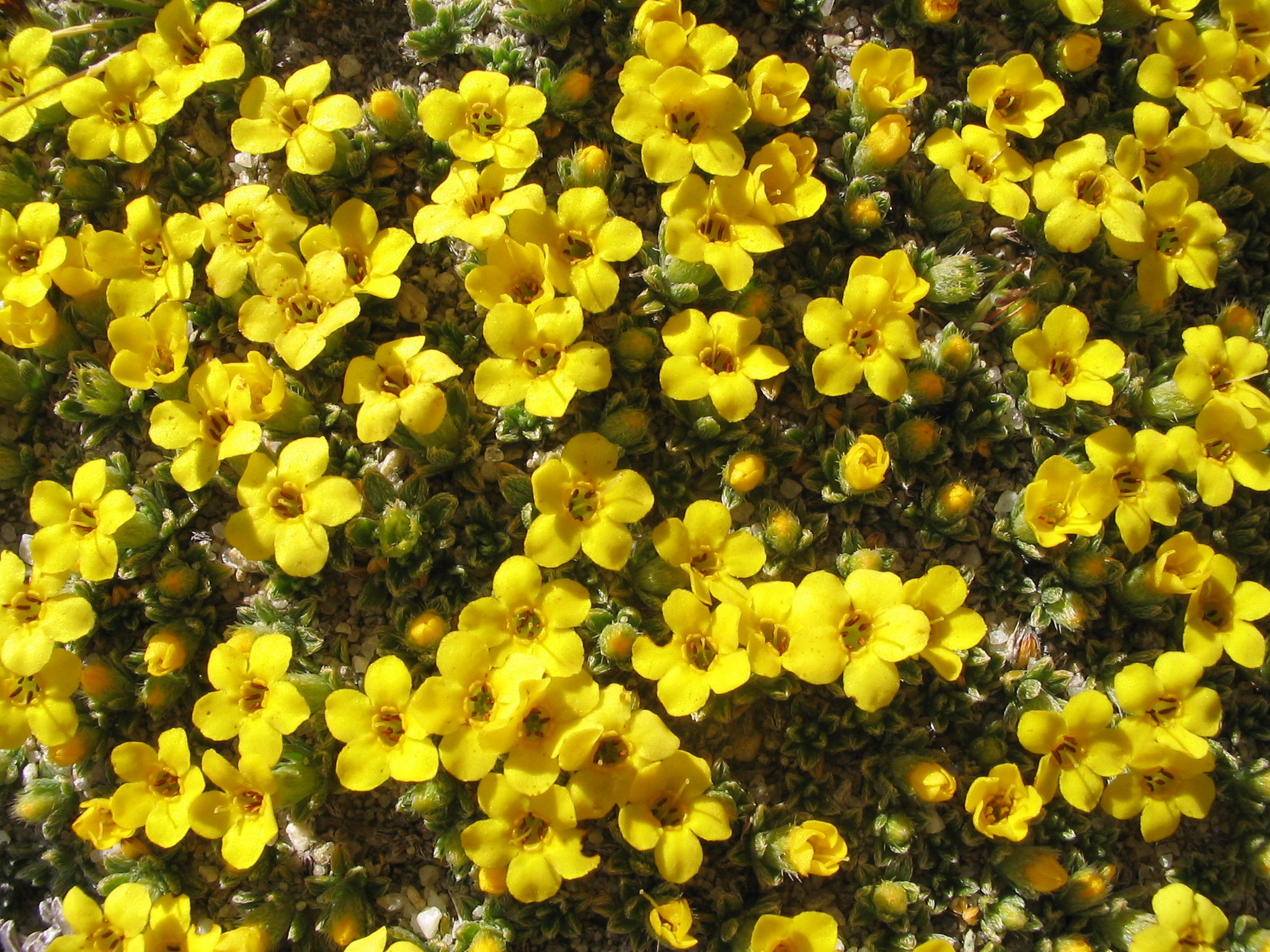
Close-up of flowers

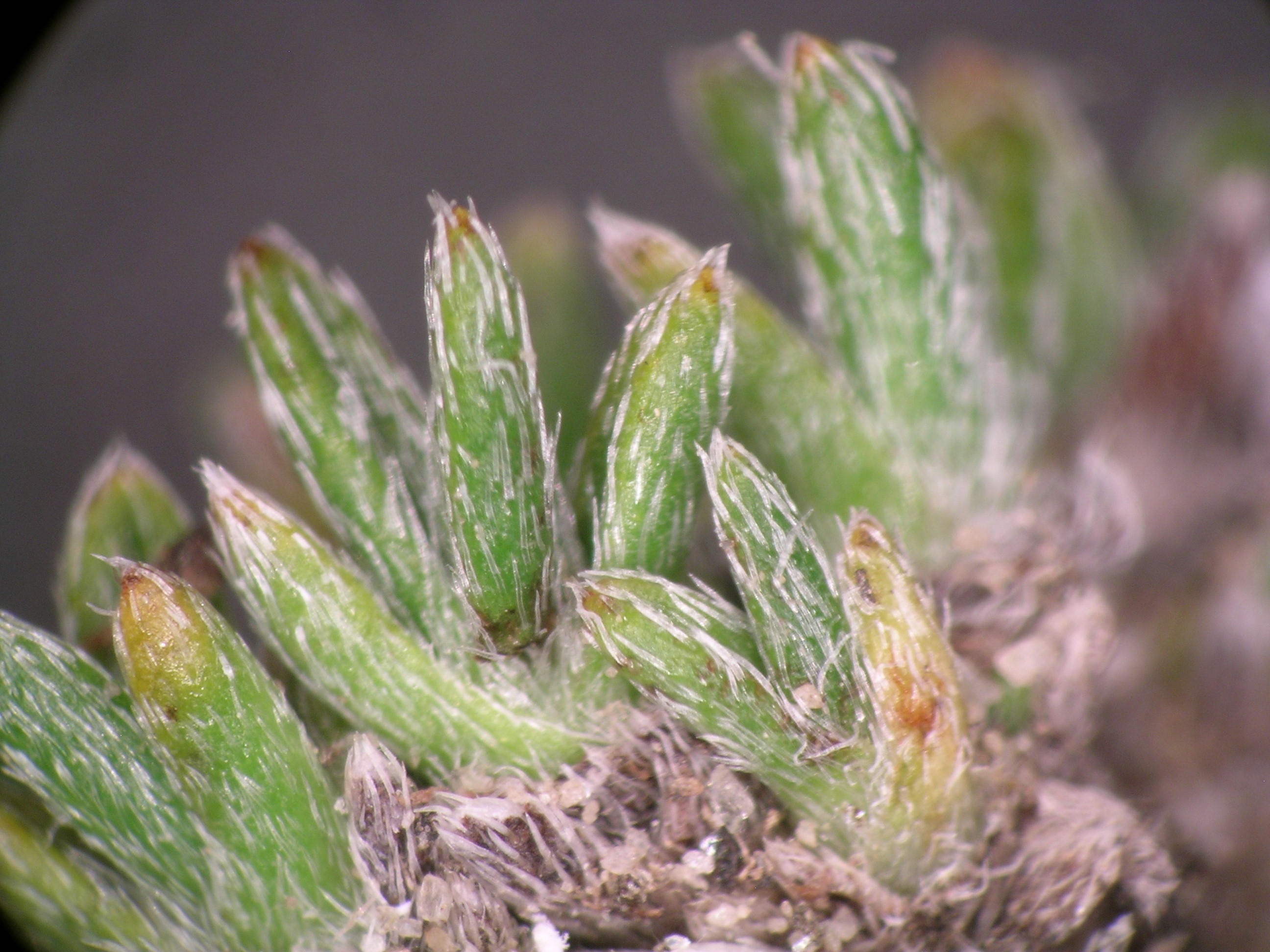
Close-up of leaves

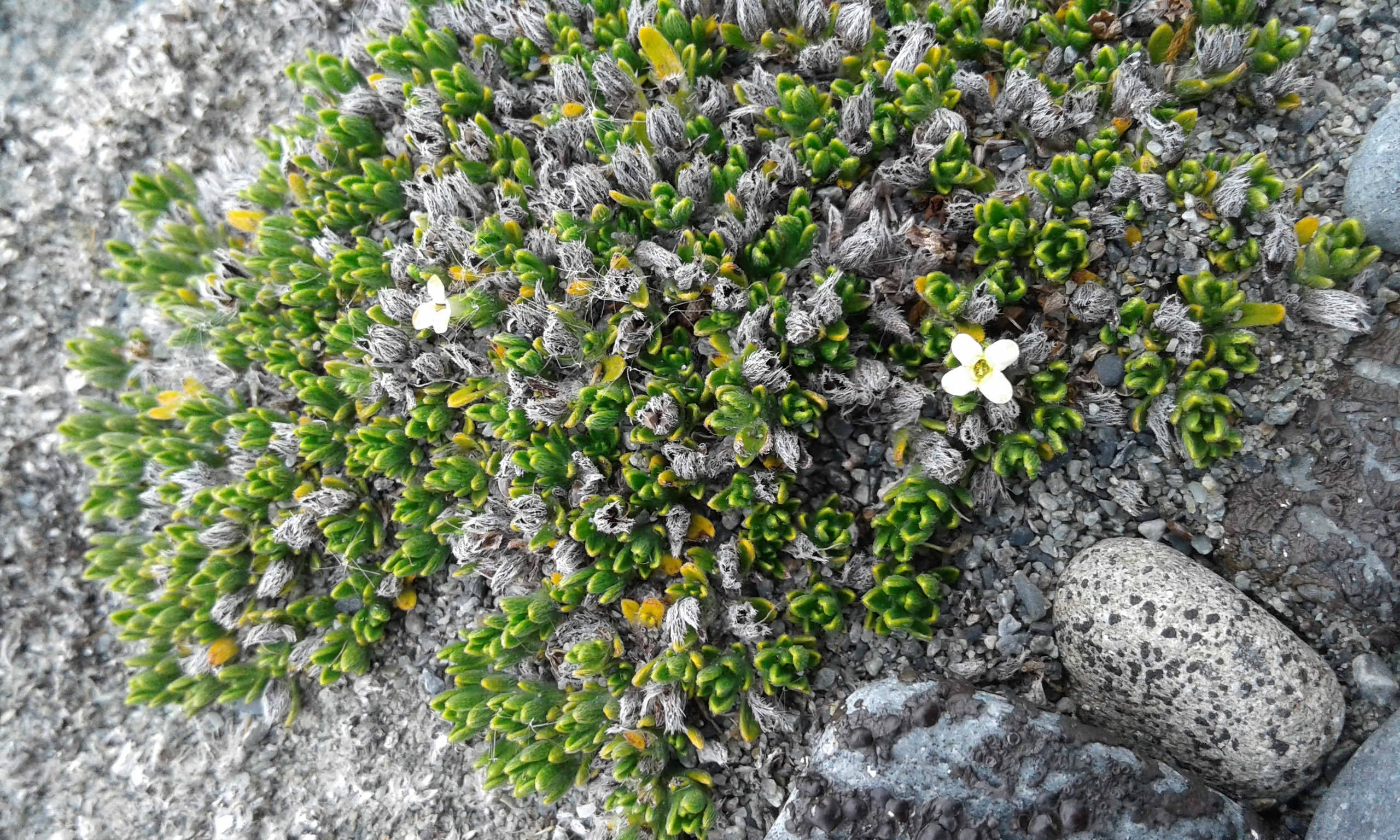
Flowering cushion

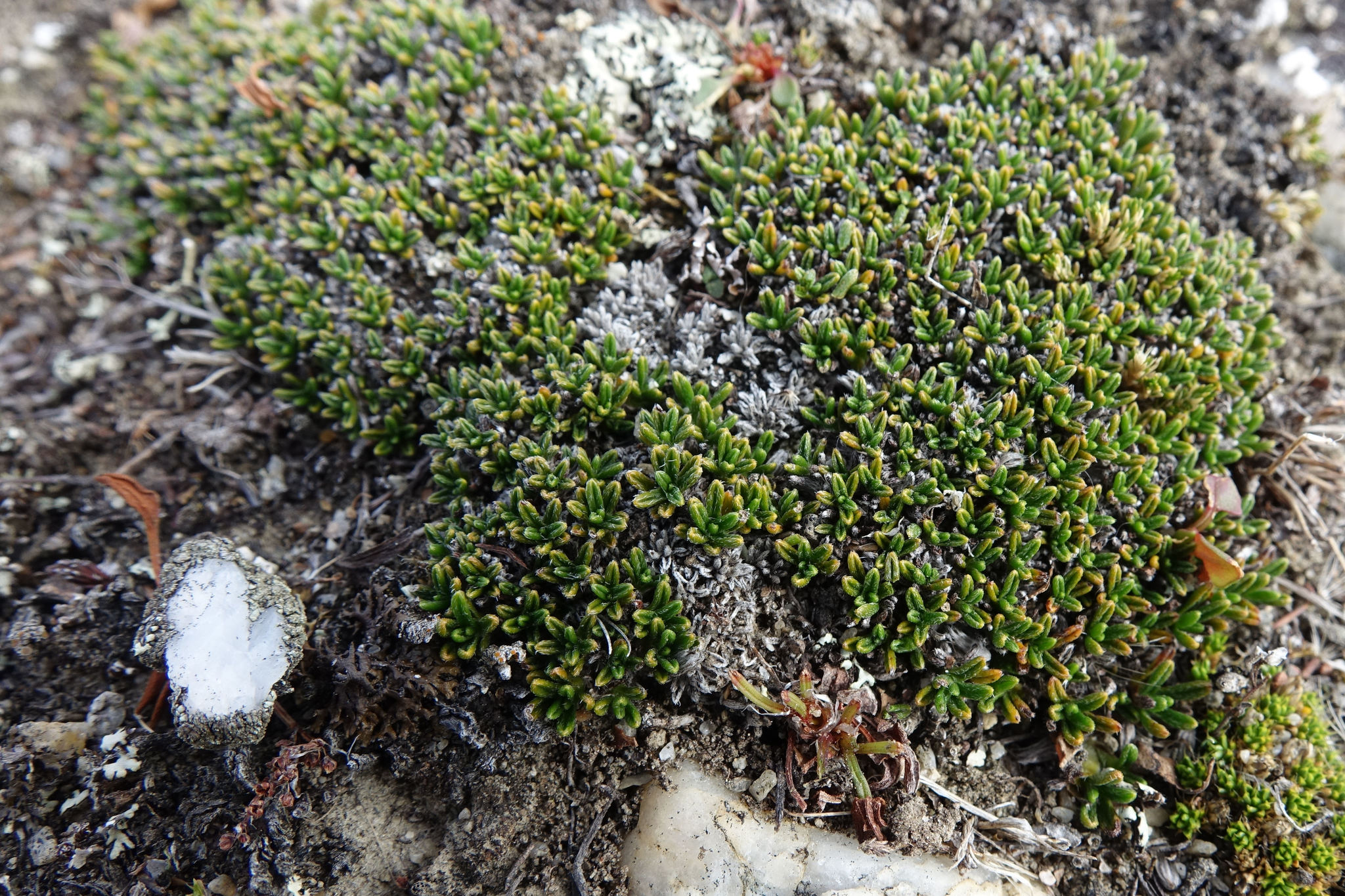
Leaves

== Taxonomy ==
Myosotis uniflora Hook.f. is in the plant family Boraginaceae and was described in 1867 by Joseph Dalton Hooker. It is morphologically most similar to the other two cushion- or mat-forming species, M. pulvinaris and M. glabrescens. Myosotis uniflora differs from these two species in its ecology and morphology, including its cream to yellow corollas; acute, lanceolate to ovate narrow (< 1.3 mm) rosette leaf lamina; and narrow petioles (< 1.2 mm wide).

The lectotype specimen of Myosotis uniflora is lodged at Kew Herbarium (K000787907). Two isolectotypes (K000787908 and K000787910) are also found on the same sheet as the lectotype, and a third isolectotype is at the Allan Herbarium of Manaaki Whenua - Landcare Research (CHR 97402).

The specific epithet, uniflora, is derived from Latin for 'one-flowered'.

=== Phylogeny ===
Myosotis uniflora was shown to be a part of the monophyletic southern hemisphere lineage of Myosotis in phylogenetic analyses of standard DNA sequencing markers (nuclear ribosomal DNA and chloroplast DNA regions). The two sequenced individuals of M. uniflora were near but not sister to each other in the nuclear ribosomal DNA phylogeny, grouping with other bracteate-prostrate species such as M. glauca and M. antarctica. Within the southern hemisphere lineage, species relationships were not well resolved.

== Distribution and habitat ==
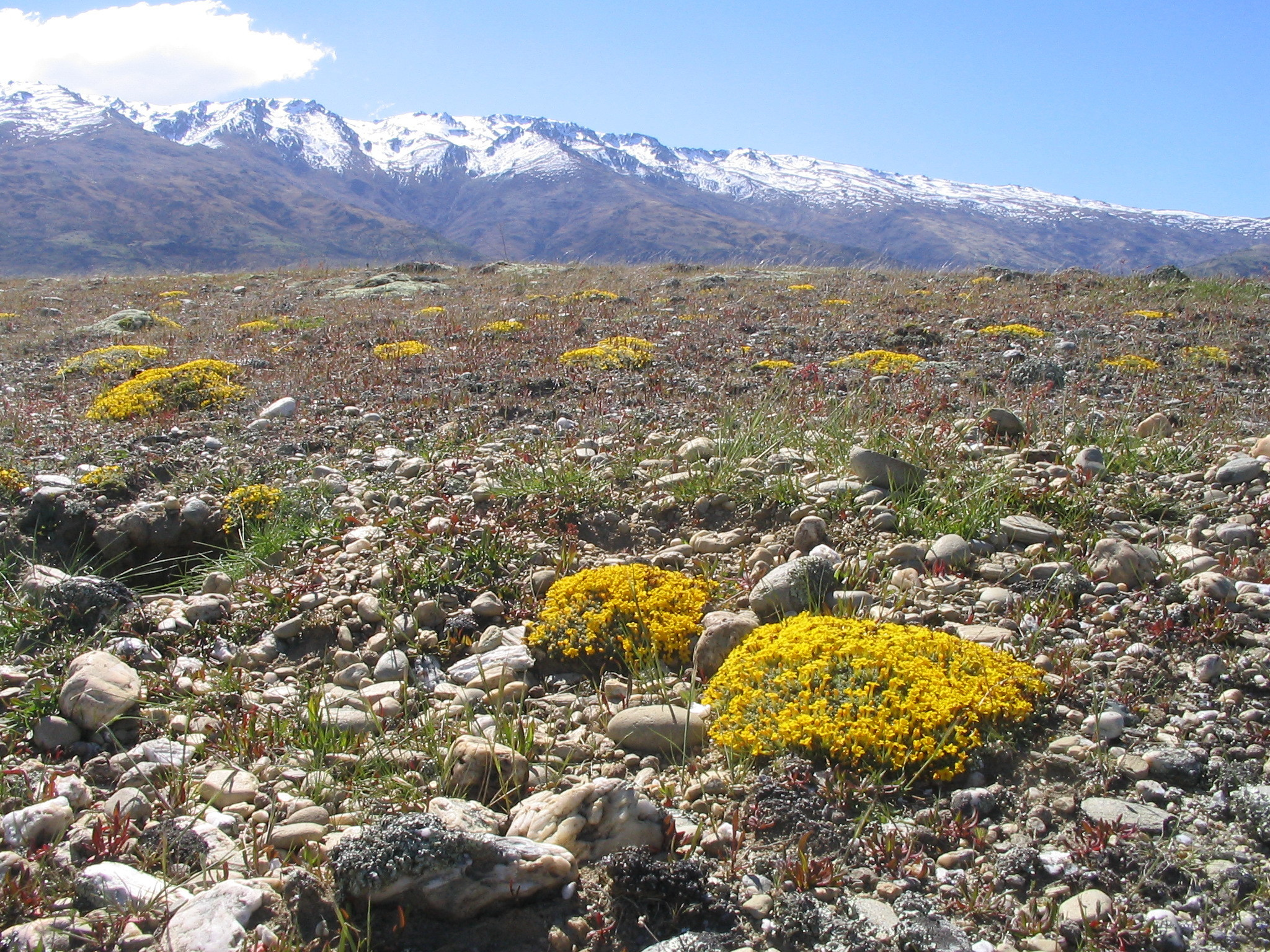
Flowering plants in herbfield and cushionfield terrace habitat

Myosotis uniflora is a forget-me-not endemic to the South Island of New Zealand in the ecological districts of Canterbury and Otago from 210–850 m ASL elevation. It is mainly found in Otago, but is also known from Westland, Canterbury and Fiordland from 1020–2130 m ASL. M. uniflora plants are found scattered throughout lowland river-bed flats and terraces, with other cushions, herbs and subshrubs. They are closely associated with cushionfield, moss-stonefield and stonefield plant communities in upper river catchments.

== Conservation status ==
The species is listed as "At Risk - Naturally Uncommon" on the most recent assessment (2017-2018) under the New Zealand Threatened Classification system for plants, with the qualifiers "Sp" (Sparse) and "DP" (Data Poor).
