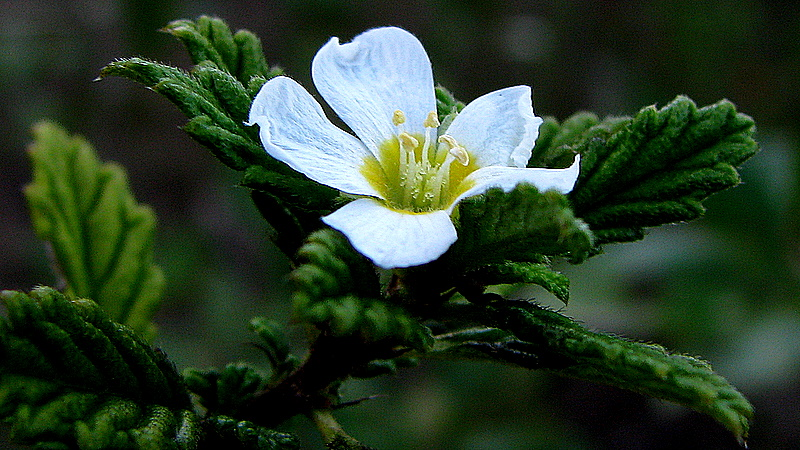
- Flower of Oxossia calyptrocarpa

Scientific classification
- Kingdom: Plantae
- Clade: Embryophytes
- Clade: Tracheophytes
- Clade: Angiosperms
- Clade: Eudicots
- Clade: Rosids
- Order: Malpighiales
- Family: Passifloraceae
- Subfamily: Turneroideae
- Genus: Oxossia; L.Rocha
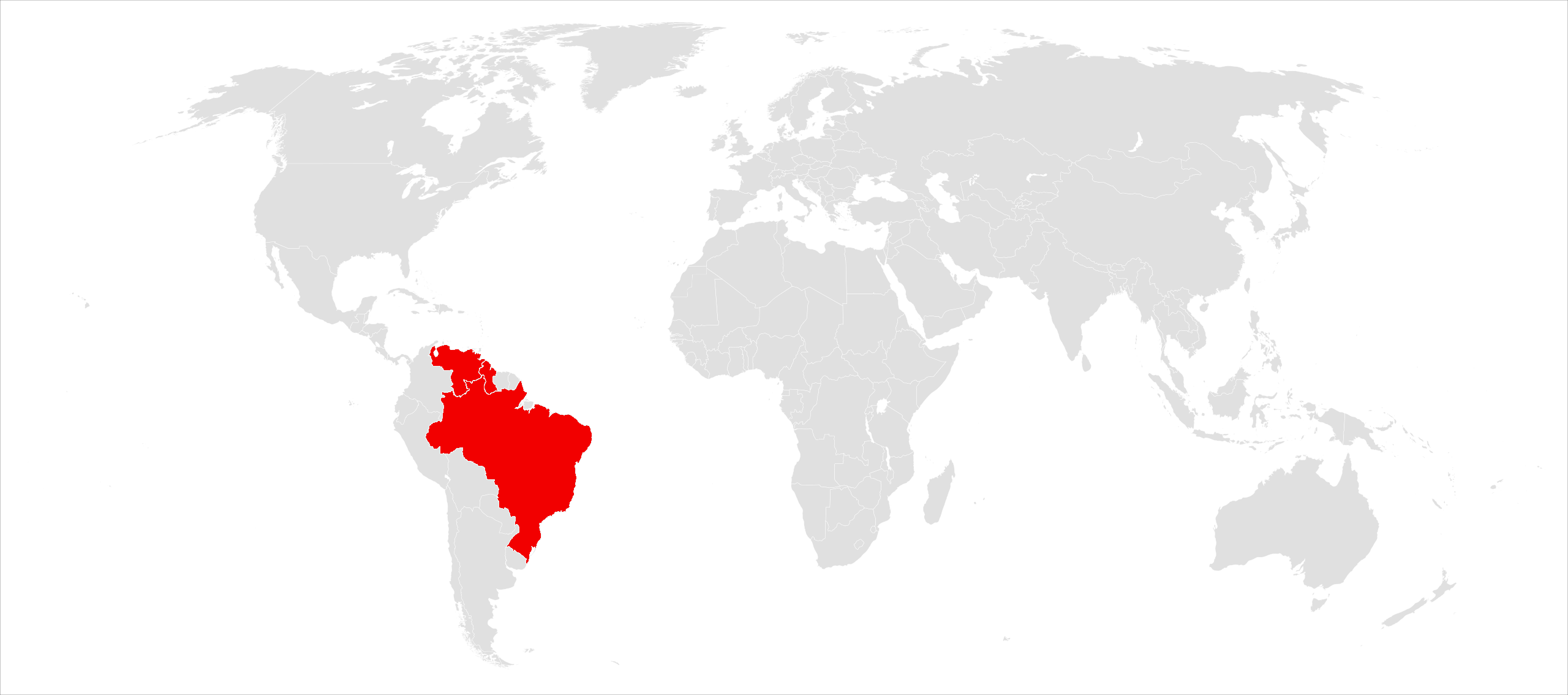

= Oxossia =

Genus of flowering plants

Oxossia is a genus of flowering plants in the subfamily Turneroideae (Passifloraceae) consisting of 15 species. This genus was recently defined in 2019 after a phylogenetic analysis of Turnera justified the creation of the genus.

== Description ==
The genus is characterized by its stipules, small flowers, congested inflorescences, "hairy" stamen and style, and the attachment of stamen to the floral tube. All members of the genus are heterostylous with the exception of O. dasystyla. The genus can be divided into two morphological groups: those with white petals and those with yellow pink or red petals.

== Species ==
- Oxossia albicans (Urb.) L.Rocha
- Oxossia annularis (Urb.) L.Rocha
- Oxossia calyptrocarpa (Urb.) L.Rocha
- Oxossia capitata (Cambess.) L.Rocha
- Oxossia dasystyla (Urb.) L.Rocha
- Oxossia hatschbachii (Arbo) L.Rocha
- Oxossia hebepetala (Urb.) L.Rocha
- Oxossia maracasana (Arbo) L.Rocha
- Oxossia marmorata (Urb.) L.Rocha
- Oxossia pernambucensis (Urb.) L.Rocha
- Oxossia princeps (Arbo) L.Rocha
- Oxossia rubrobracteata (Arbo) L.Rocha
- Oxossia schomburgkiana (Urb.) L.Rocha
- Oxossia spicata (L.Rocha & Arbo) L.Rocha
- Oxossia waltherioides (Urb.) L.Rocha

== Phylogeny ==
- - Outgroup
    Piriqueta
  - - Oxossia marmorata
    - - Oxossia pernambucensis
      - - Oxossia capitata
        - - Oxossia rubrobracteata
          - - - Oxossia annularis
              - - Oxossia calyptrocarpa
                - Oxossia hebepetala
            - - Oxossia hatschbachii
              - - Oxossia maracasana
                - - Oxossia albicans
                  - Oxossia spicata
