= Self-incompatibility =

Biological reproductive mechanism component

Self-incompatibility (SI) is a general name for any genetic mechanism that prevents self-fertilization in fertile hermaphroditic organisms, and thus encourages outcrossing and allogamy. It is contrasted with separation of sexes among individuals (dioecy), and their various modes of spatial (herkogamy) and temporal (dichogamy) separation.

SI is best-studied and particularly common in flowering plants, although it is present in other groups, including sea squirts and fungi. In plants with SI, when a pollen grain produced in a plant reaches a stigma of the same plant or another plant with a matching allele or genotype, the process of pollen germination, pollen-tube growth, ovule fertilization, or embryo development is inhibited, and consequently no seeds are produced. SI is one of the most important means of preventing inbreeding and promoting the generation of new genotypes in plants and it is considered one of the causes of the spread and success of angiosperms on Earth.

== Mechanisms of single-locus self-incompatibility ==
The best studied mechanisms of SI act by inhibiting the germination of pollen on stigmas, or the elongation of the pollen tube in the pistils. These mechanisms are based on protein-protein interactions, and the best-understood mechanisms are controlled by a single locus termed S, which has many different alleles in the species population. Despite their similar morphological and genetic manifestations, these mechanisms have evolved independently, and are based on different cellular components; therefore, each mechanism has its own, unique S-genes.

The S-locus contains two basic protein coding regions – one expressed in the pistil, and the other in the anther and/or pollen (referred to as the female and male determinants, respectively). Due to their physical proximity, these are genetically linked, and are inherited as a unit. The units are called S-haplotypes. The translation products of the two regions of the S-locus are two proteins which, by interacting with one another, lead to the arrest of pollen germination and/or pollen tube elongation, and thereby generate an SI response, preventing fertilization. However, when a female determinant interacts with a male determinant of a different haplotype, no SI is created, and fertilization ensues. This is a simplistic description of the general mechanism of SI, which is more complicated, and in some species the S-haplotype contains more than two protein coding regions.

Following is a detailed description of the different known mechanisms of SI in plants.

=== Gametophytic self-incompatibility ===
In gametophytic self-incompatibility, the SI phenotype of the pollen is determined by its own gametophytic haploid genotype. This is the most common type of SI. Two different mechanisms of gametophytic self-incompatibility have been described in detail at the molecular level, and their description follows.

==== The RNase-based SI mechanism ====
In this mechanism, pollen tube elongation is halted when it has proceeded approximately one third of the way through the style. The female component ribonuclease protein, termed S-RNase probably causes degradation of the ribosomal RNA (rRNA) inside the pollen tube, in the case of identical male and female S alleles, and consequently pollen tube elongation is arrested, and the pollen grain dies.

By 2000, proteins involved in gametophytic self-incompatibility belonging to the same RNase gene family were also found to cause pollen rejection in species of Rosaceae and Plantaginaceae. Despite initial uncertainty about the common ancestry of RNase-based SI in these distantly related plant families, phylogenetic studies and the finding of shared male determinants (F-box proteins) strongly supported homology across eudicots. Therefore, this mechanism likely arose approximately 90 million years ago, and is the inferred ancestral state for approximately 50% of all plant species.

Predictions about the wide distribution of this mechanism of SI were confirmed in the early 21st century, placing additional support of its single ancient origin. Specifically, a style-expressed T2/S-RNase gene and pollen-expressed F-box genes are now implicated in causing SI among the members of Rubiaceae, Rutaceae, Cactaceae, and Primulaceae. Therefore, other mechanisms of SI are thought to be recently derived in eudicots plants, in some cases relatively recently. One particularly interesting case is the SI expressed in Prunus species, which functions through self-recognition (the cytotoxic activity of the S-RNases is inhibited by default and selectively activated by the pollen partner S-haplotype-specific F-box protein (SFB) upon self-pollination), while SI in the other species with S-RNase functions through non-self recognition (the S-RNases are selectively detoxified upon cross-pollination).

==== The S-glycoprotein mechanism ====
In this mechanism, pollen growth is inhibited within minutes of its placement on the stigma, and the described underlying molecular mechanism detailed for Papaver rhoeas so far appears restricted to the plant family Papaveraceae, but with only a narrowly confined taxonomic search outside this single species.

The female determinant is a small, extracellular molecule, expressed in the stigma; the identity of the male determinant remains elusive, but it is probably some cell membrane receptor. The interaction between male and female determinants transmits a cellular signal into the pollen tube, resulting in strong influx of calcium cations; this interferes with the intracellular concentration gradient of calcium ions which exists inside the pollen tube, essential for its elongation. The influx of calcium ions arrests tube elongation within 1–2 minutes. At this stage, pollen inhibition is still reversible, and elongation can be resumed by applying certain manipulations, resulting in ovule fertilization.

Subsequently, the cytosolic protein p26, a pyrophosphatase, is inhibited by phosphorylation, possibly resulting in arrest of synthesis of molecular building blocks, required for tube elongation. There is depolymerization and reorganization of actin filaments, within the pollen cytoskeleton. Within 10 minutes from the placement on the stigma, the pollen is committed to a process which ends in its death. At 3–4 hours past pollination, fragmentation of pollen DNA begins, and finally (at 10–14 hours), the cell dies apoptotically.

=== Sporophytic self-incompatibility (SSI) ===
In sporophytic self-incompatibility (SSI), the SI phenotype of the pollen is determined by the diploid genotype of the anther (the sporophyte) in which it was created. This form of SI was identified in the families: Brassicaceae, Asteraceae, Convolvulaceae, Betulaceae, Caryophyllaceae, Sterculiaceae and Polemoniaceae. Up to this day, only one mechanism of SSI has been described in detail at the molecular level, in Brassica (Brassicaceae).

Since SSI is determined by a diploid genotype, the pollen and pistil each express the translation products of two different alleles, i.e. two male and two female determinants. Dominance relationships often exist between pairs of alleles, resulting in complicated patterns of compatibility/self-incompatibility. These dominance relationships also allow the generation of individuals homozygous for a recessive S allele.

Compared to a population in which all S alleles are co-dominant, the presence of dominance relationships in the population raises the chances of compatible mating between individuals. The frequency ratio between recessive and dominant S alleles reflects a dynamic balance between reproductive assurance (favoured by recessive alleles) and avoidance of selfing (favoured by dominant alleles).

==== The SI mechanism in Brassica ====
The SI phenotype of the pollen is determined by the diploid genotype of the anther. In Brassica, the pollen coat, derived from the anther's tapetum tissue, carries the translation products of the two S alleles. These are small, cysteine-rich proteins. The male determinant is termed SCR or SP11, and is expressed in the anther tapetum as well as in the microspore and pollen (i.e. sporophytically). There are possibly up to 100 polymorphs of the S-haplotype in Brassica, and within these there is a dominance hierarchy.

The female determinant of the SI response in Brassica, is a transmembrane protein termed SRK, which has an intracellular kinase domain, and a variable extracellular domain. SRK is expressed in the stigma, and probably functions as a receptor for the SCR/SP11 protein in the pollen coat. Another stigmatic protein, termed SLG, is highly similar in sequence to the SRK protein, and seems to function as a co-receptor for the male determinant, amplifying the SI response.

The interaction between the SRK and SCR/SP11 proteins results in autophosphorylation of the intracellular kinase domain of SRK, and a signal is transmitted into the papilla cell of the stigma. Another protein essential for the SI response is MLPK, a serine-threonine kinase, which is anchored to the plasma membrane from its intracellular side. A downstream signaling cascade leads to proteasomal degradation that produces an SI response.

== Other mechanisms of self-incompatibility ==
These mechanisms have received only limited attention in scientific research. Therefore, they are still poorly understood.

=== Two-locus gametophytic self-incompatibility ===
The grass subfamily Pooideae, and perhaps all of the family Poaceae, have a gametophytic self-incompatibility system that involves two unlinked loci referred to as S and Z. If the alleles expressed at these two loci in the pollen grain both match the corresponding alleles in the pistil, the pollen grain will be recognized as incompatible. At both loci, S and Z, two male and one female determinant can be found. All four male determinants encode proteins belonging to the same family (DUF247) and are predicted to be membrane-bound. The two female determinants are predicted to be secreted proteins with no protein family membership.

=== Heteromorphic self-incompatibility ===
A distinct SI mechanism exists in heterostylous flowers, termed heteromorphic self-incompatibility. This mechanism is probably not evolutionarily related to the more familiar mechanisms, which are differentially defined as homomorphic self-incompatibility.

Many heterostylous taxa feature SI to some extent. The loci responsible for SI in heterostylous flowers, are strongly linked to the loci responsible for flower polymorphism, and these traits are inherited together. Distyly is determined by a single locus, which has two alleles; tristyly is determined by two loci, each with two alleles. Heteromorphic SI is sporophytic, i.e. both alleles in the male plant, determine the SI response in the pollen. SI loci always contain only two alleles in the population, one of which is dominant over the other, in both pollen and pistil. Variance in SI alleles parallels the variance in flower morphs, thus pollen from one morph can fertilize only pistils from the other morph. In tristylous flowers, each flower contains two types of stamens; each stamen produces pollen capable of fertilizing only one flower morph, out of the three existing morphs.

A population of a distylous plant contains only two SI genotypes: ss and Ss. Fertilization is possible only between genotypes; each genotype cannot fertilize itself. This restriction maintains a 1:1 ratio between the two genotypes in the population; genotypes are usually randomly scattered in space. Tristylous plants generally contain, in addition to the S locus, the M locus, also with two alleles. The number of possible genotypes is greater here, but a 1:1 ratio exists between individuals of each SI type.

=== Cryptic self-incompatibility (CSI) ===
Cryptic self-incompatibility (CSI) is not a single 'mechanism,' but the term ascribed to an amalgamation of phenomena involved in reducing the relative seed set by self compared with non-self pollen. Specifically, CSI is invoked when the simultaneous presence of non-self and self pollen on the same pistil, results in higher seed set from non-self pollen, relative to self pollen. Controversially, because it stands in contrast to the standard definition of SI, in CSI phenomena, self-pollination without the presence of competing cross pollen, results in successive fertilization and seed set. CSI acts, at least in some species, at the stage of pollen tube elongation, and leads to faster elongation of cross pollen tubes, relative to self pollen tubes. The cellular and molecular mechanisms of CSI have not been described.

The index commonly used to estimate the strength of a CSI employs the ratio of crossed to selfed ovules formed when equal amounts of non-self and self pollen are placed upon the stigma. In the taxa described as CSI, this ratio ranges widely (3.2 to 11.5).

=== Late-acting self-incompatibility (LSI) ===
Late-acting self-incompatibility (LSI) is also termed ovarian self-incompatibility (OSI). In this mechanism, self pollen germinates and reaches the ovules, but no fruit is set. LSI can be pre-zygotic (e.g. deterioration of the embryo sac prior to pollen tube entry, as in Narcissus triandrus) or post-zygotic (malformation of the zygote or embryo, as in certain species of Asclepias and in Spathodea campanulata).

The existence of the LSI mechanism among different taxa and in general, is subject for scientific debate. Criticizers claim, that absence of fruit set is due to genetic defects (homozygosity for lethal recessive alleles), which are the direct result of self-fertilization (inbreeding depression). Supporters, on the other hand, argue for the existence of several basic criteria, which differentiate certain cases of LSI from the inbreeding depression phenomenon.

== Self-compatibility (SC) ==
Self-compatibility (SC) is the absence of genetic mechanisms which prevent self-fertilization resulting in plants that can reproduce successfully via both self-pollen and pollen from other individuals. Approximately one half of angiosperm species are SI, the remainder being SC. Mutations that disable SI (resulting in SC) may become common or entirely dominate in natural populations. Pollinator decline, variability in pollinator service, the so-called "automatic advantage" of self-fertilisation, among other factors, may favor the loss of SI.

Many cultivated plants are SC, although there are notable exceptions, such as apples and Brassica oleracea. Human-mediated artificial selection through selective breeding is often responsible for SC among these agricultural crops. SC enables more efficient breeding techniques to be employed for crop improvement. However, when genetically similar SI cultivars are bred, inbreeding depression can cause a cross-incompatible form of SC to arise, such as in apricots and almonds. In this rare, intraspecific, cross-incompatible mechanism, individuals have more reproductive success when self-pollinated rather than when cross-pollinated with other individuals of the same species. In wild populations, intraspecific cross-incompatibility has been observed in Nothoscordum bivalve.

== See also ==
- Allogamy – Type of fertilization
- Dichogamy – Sex change as part of the normal life cycle of a species
- Dimorphous flower – Two different types of flowers (style) on same plant
- Dioecy – Having distinct male and female organisms
- Heterosis – Difference in a quantitative trait between heterozygous and homozygous genotypes
- Monocotyledon reproduction – Flowering plant reproduction system
- Outcrossing – Technique of crossing between different breeds
- Plant sexuality – Parts of plant enabling sexual reproduction
- Pollination – Biological process occurring in plants
- Protandry – Sex change as part of the normal life cycle of a species
