= Oxossia spicata =

Scientific classification
- Kingdom: Plantae
- Clade: Tracheophytes
- Clade: Angiosperms
- Clade: Eudicots
- Clade: Rosids
- Order: Malpighiales
- Family: Passifloraceae
- Genus: Oxossia
- Species: O. spicata

Binomial name
- Oxossia spicata (L.Rocha & Arbo) L.Rocha

Synonyms
- Turnera spicata (L.Rocha & Arbo)

Species of flowering plant

Oxossia spicata is a shrub in the genus Oxossia (Passifloraceae). It is native to the Atlantic Rainforest of Espírito Santo, Brazil. The species is known from three different populations, however, additional field work is needed to determine the conservation status of O. spicata.

Similar to other members of the genus, O. spicata has white distylous flowers. It closely resembles T. albicans, but differs in location and sessile flowers and simple tector trichomes.
