= Oxossia hatschbachii =

Scientific classification
- Kingdom: Plantae
- Clade: Tracheophytes
- Clade: Angiosperms
- Clade: Eudicots
- Clade: Rosids
- Order: Malpighiales
- Family: Passifloraceae
- Genus: Oxossia
- Species: O. hatschbachii

Binomial name
- Oxossia hatschbachii (Arbo) L.Rocha

Synonyms
- Turnera hatschbachii Arbo

Species of flowering plant

Oxossia hatschbachii is a species of shrub in the genus Oxossia (Passifloraceae). It is native to the Atlantic Rainforest near Espírito Santo, Brazil. O. hatchbachii has heterostylous racemose flowers, ranging in color from white to red.

== Varieties ==
There are two accepted varieties of Oxossia hatschbachii, variety hatschbachii and variety miniata.

Oxossia hatschbachii var. hatschbachii is a shrub that grows up to 1.2m tall, has white flowers, cylindrical ligules, and glabrous or subglabrous ovaries. O. hatschbachii var. miniata differs in that it is a miniature tree, growing to heights of 3m, it has red flowers, flat ligules and pilose ovaries.
