= Oxossia princeps =

Scientific classification
- Kingdom: Plantae
- Clade: Tracheophytes
- Clade: Angiosperms
- Clade: Eudicots
- Clade: Rosids
- Order: Malpighiales
- Family: Passifloraceae
- Genus: Oxossia
- Species: O. princeps

Binomial name
- Oxossia princeps (Arbo) L.Rocha

Synonyms
- Turnera princeps Arbo

Species of flowering plant

Oxossia princeps is a subshrub in the genus Oxossia (Passifloraceae). It is native to the savanna of Minas Gerais, Brazil. It is considered "rare", but its conservation classification is currently unknown.

Similar to other members of the genus, O. princeps has white distylous flowers. It can be distinguished from other members of the genus by its elliptic obovate leaves.
