= Tristyly =

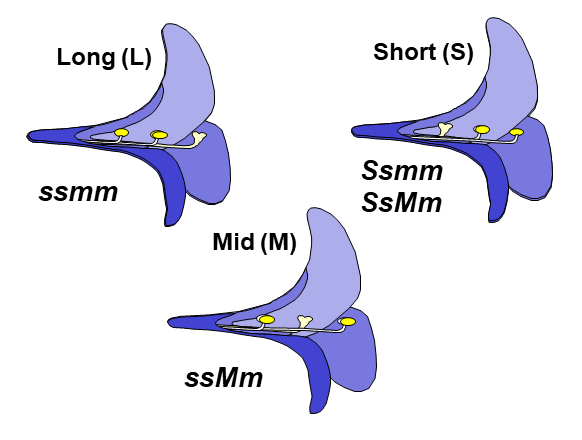
Model of style and stamen morphology in tristylous species, Eichhornia paniculata with associated allelic combination.

Tristyly is a rare floral polymorphism that consists of three floral morphs that differ in regard to the length of the stamens and style within the flower. This type of floral mechanism is thought to encourage outcross pollen transfer and is usually associated with heteromorphic self-incompatibility to reduce inbreeding. It is an example of heterostyly and reciprocal herkogamy, like distyly, which is the more common form of heterostyly. Darwin first described tristylous species in 1877 in terms of the incompatibility of these three morphs.

== Description ==
The three floral morphs of tristylous plants are based on the positioning of the male and female reproductive structures, as either long-, mid-, or short-styled morphs. Often this is shortened to L, M and S morphs. There are two different lengths of stamens in each flower morph that oppose the length of the style. For example, in the short-styled morph, the two sets of stamen are arranged in the mid and long position in order to prevent autogamy. In trimorphic incompatibility system, full seed set is accomplished only with pollination of stigmas by pollen from anthers of the same height. This incompatibility system produces pollen and styles with three different incompatibility phenotypes because of the three style and stamen lengths.

Tristylous species have been found in several angiosperm families including the Oxalidaceae, Pontederiaceae, Amaryllidaceae, Connaraceae, Linaceae and Lythraceae, though several others have been proposed. There is not a consistent consensus on the specific criteria defining tristyly. In a 1993 review of tristylous evolutionary biology, Barrett proposes three common features for tristylous plants, 1) three floral morphs with differing style and stamen height, 2) a trimorphic incompatibility system, and 3) additional polymorphisms of the stigmas and pollen.

== Heteromorphic Incompatibility System ==
This incompatibility system is a specific mechanism employed by heterostylous species, where incompatibility is based on the positioning of the reproductive structure of the flower. In tristylous species this is based on two loci, S and M with one allele dominant at each loci. For the short-styled morph the dominant allele is in the S locus (Ssmm or SsMm), whereas in the mid-styled morph the dominant allele is at the M locus (ssMm). The S locus is epistatic to the M locus such that the presence of the S allele produces a short-styled flower regardless of the genotype at the M locus. The long-styled morph, on the other hand, is homozygous recessive for both loci (ssmm).

In tristylous species, incompatibility varies, with some species showing varying degrees of compatibility outside of the reciprocal herkogamy pattern of pollination. Darwin noted weak incompatibility commonly occurring in the M-morph of Lythrum salicaria. Some species have shown weak or absent incompatibility in their mating system, however self-compatibility in tristylous species is still poorly understood. Research on Eichhornia paniculata, found difference in pollen tube growth between intra- and inter-morph pollen, indicating that the incompatibility system is a case of cryptic self-incompatibility.

== Evolution ==
Heterostyly has been found in at least 28 families, while tristyly has only been found in six families. The rarity and complexity of tristyly coupled with its development in a variety of unrelated plant families has made its evolution and adaptive significant hard to discern. It would be assumed that distyly would be the intermediate stage to tristyly but it has also been proposed that that distyly originated from tristyly through the loss of one of the floral morphs. However, in the vast majority of distylous families thete are no tristylous species present, so it is possible that these two polymorphisms evolved separately.

The adaption for structural variation in heterostylous species likely developed out of the need for efficient pollen transfer and simultaneous selection to reduce self-fertilization. The mid-morph with stamen positioned below and above the stigma is unique to tristylous species. If this positioning occurred in monomorphic species it would promote self-fertilization which could be achieved much more easily without different stamen heights, indicating this positioning in heteromorphic species is meant to encourage cross pollination.
