= Cryptic self-incompatibility =

Expression in botany

Cryptic self-incompatibility (CSI) is the botanical expression that's used to describe a weakened self-incompatibility (SI) system. CSI is one expression of a mixed mating system in flowering plants. Both SI and CSI are traits that increase the frequency of fertilization of ovules by outcross pollen, as opposed to self-pollen.

== Background ==
Although the evident product of more outcrossing is a mutual result among SI systems, CSI should not be mistaken for any other form of true SI, such as common gametophytic SI or sporophytic SI. Robert Bowman outlined the distinction when he posited that cryptic SI allows for full seed set via self-pollination when outcross pollen is limited or absent. CSI has been observed to be a significant benefit to flowering plants as it allows plants to avoid inbreeding depression in their offspring when outcross pollen is available. Because this breeding method allows for full seed set it is thought of as another form of reproductive assurance. The contemporary understanding of this breeding system, which involves self-pollen discrimination, outlines the "best-of-both-worlds" hypothesis that was described by Bowman in 1987; and later refined and given a name by Becerra and Lloyd in 1992.

CSI was first described by A.J. Bateman in 1956 as a weak incompatibility system that results in a significantly higher proportion of seeds set by outcross pollen within an individual as opposed to self-pollen, when both types are present on the stigma in equal amounts.

Since the first documented observation of CSI our understanding of how these systems work has undergone several refinements as more studies are conducted. There are multiple known mechanisms through which CSI acts but it is commonly defined as a form of parental selection that occurs post-pollination. Although not all mechanisms of CSI acts have been described.

== Mechanisms ==
=== Pollen competition ===
This form of CSI is achieved by having differential pollen tube growth. It has been observed that, on average, the pollen tubes from pollen that is genetically similar to the stigma will grow more slowly than the pollen tubes from pollen that is not related to the style, known as outcross pollen. CSI occurs by stylar discrimination, such that outcross pollen tubes are favored over self pollen tubes based on differential pollen-tube growth, resulting in increased outcrossing frequency as pollen load size increases.

=== Pollen tube attrition ===
Pollen tube attrition is the failure of a pollen tube that is caused by inhibiting tube growth before fertilization can occur. This phenomenon is another way through which CSI can act. This is accomplished by failing a higher proportion of self-pollen tubes which will end up favoring fertilization by outcross pollen. This type of stylar inhibition within flowering plants, which are normally self-compatible, are known to result in mixed mating systems.
