= Oxossia maracasana =

Scientific classification
- Kingdom: Plantae
- Clade: Embryophytes
- Clade: Tracheophytes
- Clade: Spermatophytes
- Clade: Angiosperms
- Clade: Eudicots
- Clade: Rosids
- Order: Malpighiales
- Family: Passifloraceae
- Genus: Oxossia
- Species: O. maracasana

Binomial name
- Oxossia maracasana (Arbo) L.Rocha

Synonyms
- Turnera maracasana Arbo

Species of flowering plant

Oxossia maracasana is a shrub in the genus Oxossia (Passifloraceae). It is native the Caatinga regions and Atlantic forest near Bahia, Brazil. It has white heterostylous flowers.

Oxossia maracasana can be distinguished from other members of Oxossia due to its 0.2-0.3m extrafloral nectaries that are accompanied by a pair of leaves or leaves are absent. Additionally, it has a 7-9 mm calyx and 11-14 mm long corolla.

As of 2017, O. maracasana is considered endangered.

== Images ==
Images of Oxossia maracasana from the Brazilian government. Image 1 Image 2 Image 3
