= Oxossia rubrobracteata =

Scientific classification
- Kingdom: Plantae
- Clade: Tracheophytes
- Clade: Angiosperms
- Clade: Eudicots
- Clade: Rosids
- Order: Malpighiales
- Family: Passifloraceae
- Genus: Oxossia
- Species: O. rubrobracteata

Binomial name
- Oxossia rubrobracteata (Arbo) L.Rocha

Synonyms
- Turnera rubrobracteata Arbo

Species of flowering plant

Oxossia rubrobracteata is a shrub in the genus Oxossia (Passifloraceae). It is native to the Atlantic Rainforest of Brazil.

Oxosssia rubrobracteata was originally described in 2019, as it morphologically differed from other neighboring members of Turneroideae (Turnera dichotoma and T. revoluta) in the region it was originally identified. Similar to other members of the genus, O. rubrobracteata has distylous flowers. It can be distinguished from other members of the genus due to the reddish / purple color of dried bracts and its pink flowers.
