= Oxossia marmorata =

Scientific classification
- Kingdom: Plantae
- Clade: Tracheophytes
- Clade: Angiosperms
- Clade: Eudicots
- Clade: Rosids
- Order: Malpighiales
- Family: Passifloraceae
- Genus: Oxossia
- Species: O. marmorata

Binomial name
- Oxossia marmorata (Urb.) L.Rocha

Synonyms
- Turnera marmorata Urb.

Species of flowering plant

Oxossia marmorata is a shrub in the genus Oxossia (Passifloraceae). It is native to the Atlantic Rainforest of Brazil. It can be distinguished from other members of the genus by its yellow flowers. Similar to other members of Oxossia, O. marmorata has distylous flowers.

As of 2017, O. marmorata was classified as endangered.
