= Oxossia albicans =

Scientific classification
- Kingdom: Plantae
- Clade: Tracheophytes
- Clade: Angiosperms
- Clade: Eudicots
- Clade: Rosids
- Order: Malpighiales
- Family: Passifloraceae
- Genus: Oxossia
- Species: O. albicans

Binomial name
- Oxossia albicans (Urb.) L.Rocha

Synonyms
- Turnera albicans Urb.

Species of flowering plant

Oxossia albicans is a subshrub in the genus Oxossia (Passifloraceae subfamily Turneroideae). It is native to the wet tropics of eastern Brazil, specifically the Atlantic forest.

== Description ==
It is 40–80 cm tall and has yellow heterostylous flowers.

== Taxonomy ==
=== Taxonomic history ===
Previously, O. albicans was classified as Turnera, however, recent phylogenetic analyses justified its classification as Oxossia.

== Conservation ==
As of 2017, O. albicans is classified as endangered.
