= David Lloyd (botanist) =

New Zealand evolutionary biologist and botanist (1937–2006)

- Born: 20 June 1937
- Died: 30 May 2006 (aged 68)
- Known for: evolutionary biologist
- Partner: Vicki Calder

David Graham Lloyd (20 June 1937 – 30 May 2006) was an evolutionary biologist and the seventh New Zealander to be elected as a fellow of the Royal Society in London. He did pioneering work in the field of plant reproduction.

In December 1992, Lloyd fell victim to an apparent poisoning by acrylamide, a common laboratory chemical. As a result, he lay in a coma for three months and was left blind, mute, and quadriplegic. His former partner and fellow molecular biologist Vicky Calder was tried twice for his attempted murder. The first trial ended with a hung jury and the second acquitted her.

== Research ==
Lloyd's major contribution to botany was in the field of plant reproduction. His contributions to the field include a mechanistic treatment of different modes of self-pollination in hermaphroditic plants, a genetically defined continuum of plant gender, early development of theory of the evolution of separate sexes in plants, and with C.J. Webb, a challenge to conventional views of the evolution of heterostyly. Because of his ideas and work on population biology of plants, he is sometimes referred to as the "W.D. Hamilton in plant biology".
