= Oxossia hebepetala =

Scientific classification
- Kingdom: Plantae
- Clade: Tracheophytes
- Clade: Angiosperms
- Clade: Eudicots
- Clade: Rosids
- Order: Malpighiales
- Family: Passifloraceae
- Genus: Oxossia
- Species: O. hebepetala

Binomial name
- Oxossia hebepetala (Urb.) L.Rocha

Synonyms
- Turnera hebepetala Urb.

Species of flowering plant

Oxossia hebepetala is shrub in the genus Oxossia (Passifloraceae). It is native to the Caatinga of Bahria and Piauí, Brazil.

Oxossia hebepetala is distinguished from other members of Oxossia due to its con-color, obovate, dentate leaves, which have 1-4 pairs of teeth, and its seeds which lack a point depression.
