= Selfing syndrome =

Traits found in self-pollinating plants

Selfing syndrome refers to plants that are autogamous and display a complex of characteristics associated with self-pollination. The term was coined by Adrien Sicard and Michael Lenhard in 2011, but was first described in detail by Charles Darwin in his book “The Effects of Cross and Self Fertilisation in the Vegetable Kingdom” (1876), making note that the flowers of self-fertilizing plants are typically smaller and have little distance between reproductive organs.

== Characteristics ==
Plants that exhibit selfing syndrome typically possess reduced pigmentation and flower size, reduced herkogamy, and the lack of reward for pollinators. Differences between outcrossing species versus selfing species can be clearly distinguished in plants such as Collinsia grandiflora, an outcrossing species, and the selfing species Collinsia parviflora.

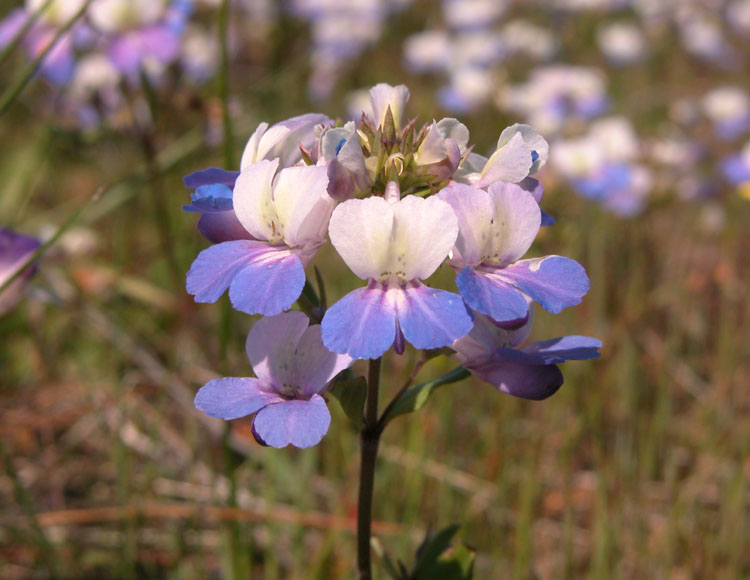
The outcrossing species Collinsia grandiflora, showing large showy flowers to attract pollinators

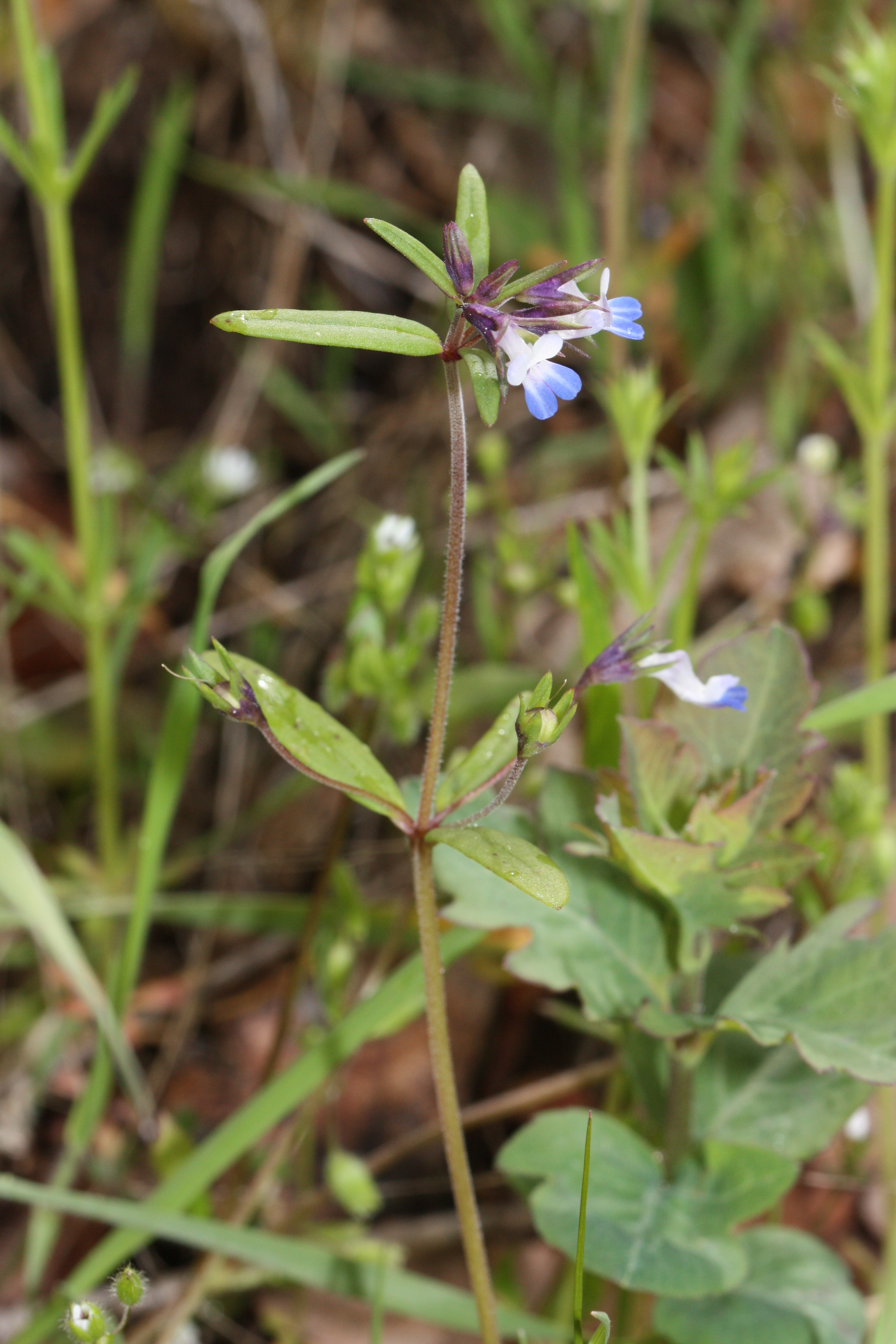
Though closely related to the above flower, this selfing species Collinsia parviflora has highly reduced flowers

== Life form of selfing species ==
Plants exhibiting selfing syndrome are typically autogamous and display reduced pollen ovule (P/O) ratios, resulting in a smaller pollen count and a larger number of ovules. The reduction of flower size has been studied between the selfing species Capsella rubella and its closely related outcrossing relative Capsella grandiflora. The petals between the two species grow at the same rate, however, a decrease in the sterile apetela (SAP) protein activity due to variation in the SAP intron in C. rubella is responsible for reduced petal size. This is due to the smaller number of cells present in the petal and results in petals that are around 35% smaller than the petals of C. grandiflora. Along with reduced flower size, plants exhibiting selfing syndrome typically have reduced numbers of open flowers compared to those that outcross. Selfing plants have also been found to have a larger geographic range, close to two times larger range than plants that outcross and can also be found around 110 kilometers higher in latitude.
