= Oxossia capitata =

Scientific classification
- Kingdom: Plantae
- Clade: Tracheophytes
- Clade: Angiosperms
- Clade: Eudicots
- Clade: Rosids
- Order: Malpighiales
- Family: Passifloraceae
- Genus: Oxossia
- Species: O. capitata

Binomial name
- Oxossia capitata (Urb.) L.Rocha

Synonyms
- Turnera capitata Cambess.; Turnera capitata subsp. intermedia Urb.; Turnera capitata f. rufescens Urb.

Species of flowering plant

Oxossia capitata is a shrub native to the wet tropics of southern Brazil. It was previously classified as Turnera, however, recent phylogenetic analyses suggested the species should be placed in Oxossia. O. capitata has heterostylous white pointed flowers.
