= Reproductive assurance =

Redundant pollination mechanisms in plants

Reproductive assurance (fertility assurance) occurs as plants have mechanisms to assure full seed set through selfing when outcross pollen is limiting. It is assumed that self-pollination is beneficial, in spite of potential fitness costs, when there is insufficient pollinator services or outcross pollen from other individuals to accomplish full seed set. This phenomenon has been observed since the 19th century, when Darwin observed that self-pollination was common in some plants. Constant pollen limitation may cause the evolution of automatic selfing, also known as autogamy. This occurs in plants such as weeds, and is a form of reproductive assurance. As plants pursue reproductive assurance through self-fertilization, there is an increase in homozygosity, and inbreeding depression, due to genetic load, which results in reduced fitness of selfed offspring. Solely outcrossing plants may not be successful colonizers of new regions due to lack of other plants to outcross with, so colonizing species are expected to have mechanisms of reproductive assurance - an idea first proposed by Herbert G. Baker and referred to as Baker's "law" or "rule". Baker's law predicts that reproductive assurance affects establishment of plants in many contexts, including spread by weedy plants and following long-distance dispersal, such as occurs during island colonization. As plants evolve towards increase self-fertilization, energy is redirected to seed production rather than characteristics that increased outcrossing, such as floral attractants, which is a condition known as the selfing syndrome.

== Evolution ==
Reproductive assurance is thought to be a driver for the evolution of selfing because it would promote purging of genetic load and it contributes to the occurrence of mixed mating systems. There are a number of mechanisms that result in reproductive assurance, but delayed selfing has been the one most studied. When pollination is unsuccessful, full seed set can be obtained through delayed selfing. Most hermaphrodite plants are self-compatible, meaning they are able to self-fertilize. When pollinators routinely fail to deliver adequate outcross pollen to ensure reproduction, selfing may increase through mechanisms of reproductive assurance, leading to the evolution of complete selfing.

== Mechanisms ==
Mechanisms of reproductive assurance include:

=== Delayed selfing ===
A common reproductive assurance mechanism that occurs in plants that are able to reproduce by self-fertilization by changing the position of the anthers and stigma within the flower to promote self-pollination.

=== Cryptic self-incompatibility (CSI) ===
Cryptic self-incompatibility favors fertilization by outcrossing pollen, when both outcross and self-pollen are present on the same stigma. CSI promotes fertilization by outcross pollen due to faster growth rate of outcross pollen tubes. Reproduction assurance occurs when there is insufficient outcross pollen present to attain fertilization of all of the ovules.

=== Autogamy ===
Similar to delayed selfing, fertilization via autogamy occurs when there is a lack of pollinators and has evolved as a form of reproductive assurance to ensure successful reproduction.

=== Cleistogamy ===
Cleistogamous flowers are produced along with chasmogamous flowers on the same plant resulting in a mixed mating system that ensures reproductive success through autogamy.
