= Oxossia annularis =

Scientific classification
- Kingdom: Plantae
- Clade: Tracheophytes
- Clade: Angiosperms
- Clade: Eudicots
- Clade: Rosids
- Order: Malpighiales
- Family: Passifloraceae
- Genus: Oxossia
- Species: O. annularis

Binomial name
- Oxossia annularis (Urb.) L.Rocha

Synonyms
- Turnera acangatinga; Turnera annularis Urb.; Turnera annularis var. conglomerata

Species of flowering plant

Oxossia annularis is a shrub of Oxossia Turneroideae (Passifloraceae) native to eastern Brazil. It is found in Caatinga, Cerrado, and Atlantic Forest.

== Description ==
O. annularis has 2–10 mm long petioles, rigid elliptical, ovate, or obovate leaves with serrated margins and heterostylous flowers.

== Taxonomy ==
It was previously classified as Turnera annularis, however, recent phylogenetic analysis supports its classification as Oxossia.
