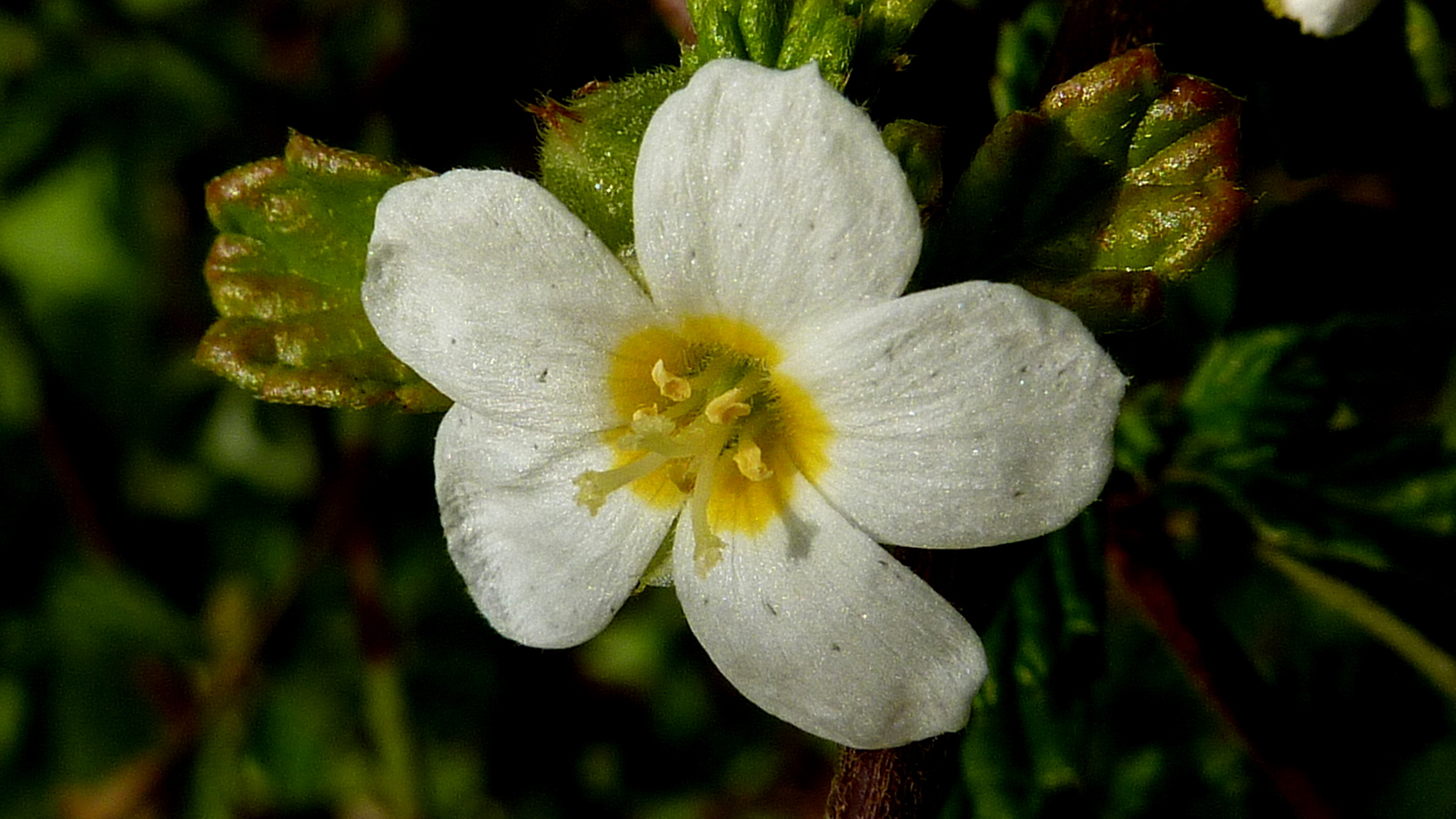
- Flower (L-morph) of Oxossia calyptrocarpa

Scientific classification
- Kingdom: Plantae
- Clade: Tracheophytes
- Clade: Angiosperms
- Clade: Eudicots
- Clade: Rosids
- Order: Malpighiales
- Family: Passifloraceae
- Genus: Oxossia
- Species: O. calyptrocarpa

Binomial name
- Oxossia calyptrocarpa (Urb.) L.Rocha

Synonyms
- Turnera calyptrocarpa Urb.

= Oxossia calyptrocarpa =

Species of shrub

Oxossia calyptrocarpa, a member of Turneroideae (Passifloraceae), is a shrub native to the wet tropics of eastern Brazil. It is found in the Caatinga, Cerrado, and Atlantic forest. It is 0.2-2.5 meter tall with highly plastic leaves and white to lilac flowers. It is a heterostylous species.

It was previously classified as Turnera, however, phylogenetic analysis supported its classification as Oxossia.
