= Oxossia schomburgkiana =

Scientific classification
- Kingdom: Plantae
- Clade: Tracheophytes
- Clade: Angiosperms
- Clade: Eudicots
- Clade: Rosids
- Order: Malpighiales
- Family: Passifloraceae
- Genus: Oxossia
- Species: O. schomburgkiana

Binomial name
- Oxossia schomburgkiana (Urb.) L.Rocha

Synonyms
- Turnera schomburgkiana Urb.

Species of flowering plant

Oxossia schomburgkiana is a shrub in the genus Oxossia (Passifloraceae). It is native to the Amazon Rainforest of Brazil.

Similar to other members of the genus, O. schomburgkiana has yellow distylous flowers. It can be distinguished from other members of the genus by its chartaceous and wide-elliptic leaves that have tomentose bottoms.
