= Oxossia dasystyla =

Scientific classification
- Kingdom: Plantae
- Clade: Tracheophytes
- Clade: Angiosperms
- Clade: Eudicots
- Clade: Rosids
- Order: Malpighiales
- Family: Passifloraceae
- Genus: Oxossia
- Species: O. dasystyla

Binomial name
- Oxossia dasystyla (Urb.) L.Rocha

Synonyms
- Turnera dasystyla Urb.

Species of flowering plant

Oxossia dasystyla is a shrub native to southeast Brazil. It is native to the jungles and surrounding fields of Minas Gerais; specifically the Caatinga and Atlantic Forest.

Oxossia dasystyla has white "horny" homostylous racemous flowers and reddish glabrous branches. It is semidecidous, flowers in December, and fruit sets in January. It differs from other members of Oxossia due to its ovate leaves, petals without ligules, and ovate bracts.
