= Allogamy =

Type of fertilization

Allogamy or cross-fertilization is the fertilization of an ovum from one individual with the spermatozoa of another. By contrast, autogamy is the term used for self-fertilization. In humans, the fertilization event is an instance of allogamy. Self-fertilization occurs in hermaphroditic organisms where the two gametes fused in fertilization come from the same individual. This is common in plants (see Sexual reproduction in plants) and certain protozoans.

In plants, allogamy is used specifically to mean the use of pollen from one plant to fertilize the flower of another plant and usually synonymous with the term "cross-fertilization" or "cross-pollination" (outcrossing). The latter term can be used more specifically to mean pollen exchange between different plant strains or even different plant species (where the term cross-hybridization can be used) rather than simply between different individuals.

Allogamy is achieved through the use of external pollinating factors. The process of allogamy involves two types of external pollinating agents, known as abiotic agents and biotic agents. The abiotic agents are water and wind. The biotic agents are insects and animals, which include bees, butterflies, snails, and birds. Wind pollination is referred to as anemophily, and water pollination is referred to as hydrophilly. Insect pollination is referred to as entomophily, bird pollination is referred to as omithophily, and snail pollination is referred to as malacophily.

Allogamy can lead to homozygosity. After reaching homozygosity, the species develop homozygous balance and fail to exhibit inbreeding depression. Mechanisms that promote self-pollination include homogamy, bisexuality, cleistogamy, the position of anthers, and chasmogamy.

Allogamy promotes genetic diversity and reduces the risk of inbreeding depression. The persistent prevalence of allogamy throughout different species implies that this strategy provides selective advantages concerning adaptation to changing environments and sustaining fitness.

Parasites having complex life cycles can pass through alternate stages of allogamous and autogamous reproduction, and the description of a hitherto unknown allogamous stage can be a significant finding with implications for human disease.

== Avoidance of inbreeding depression ==
Allogamy ordinarily involves cross-fertilization between unrelated individuals leading to the masking of deleterious recessive alleles in progeny. By contrast, close inbreeding, including self-fertilization in plants and automictic parthenogenesis in hymenoptera, tends to lead to the harmful expression of deleterious recessive alleles (inbreeding depression).

In dioecious plants, the stigma may receive pollen from several different potential donors. As multiple pollen tubes from the different donors grow through the stigma to reach the ovary, the receiving maternal plant may carry out pollen selection favoring pollen from less related donor plants. Thus post-pollination selection may occur in order to promote allogamy and avoid inbreeding depression. Also, seeds may be aborted selectively depending on donor–recipient relatedness.

== See also ==
- Heterosis
- Outcrossing
- Self-incompatibility in plants
