= Herkogamy =

Flowers' distancing of anther and stigma

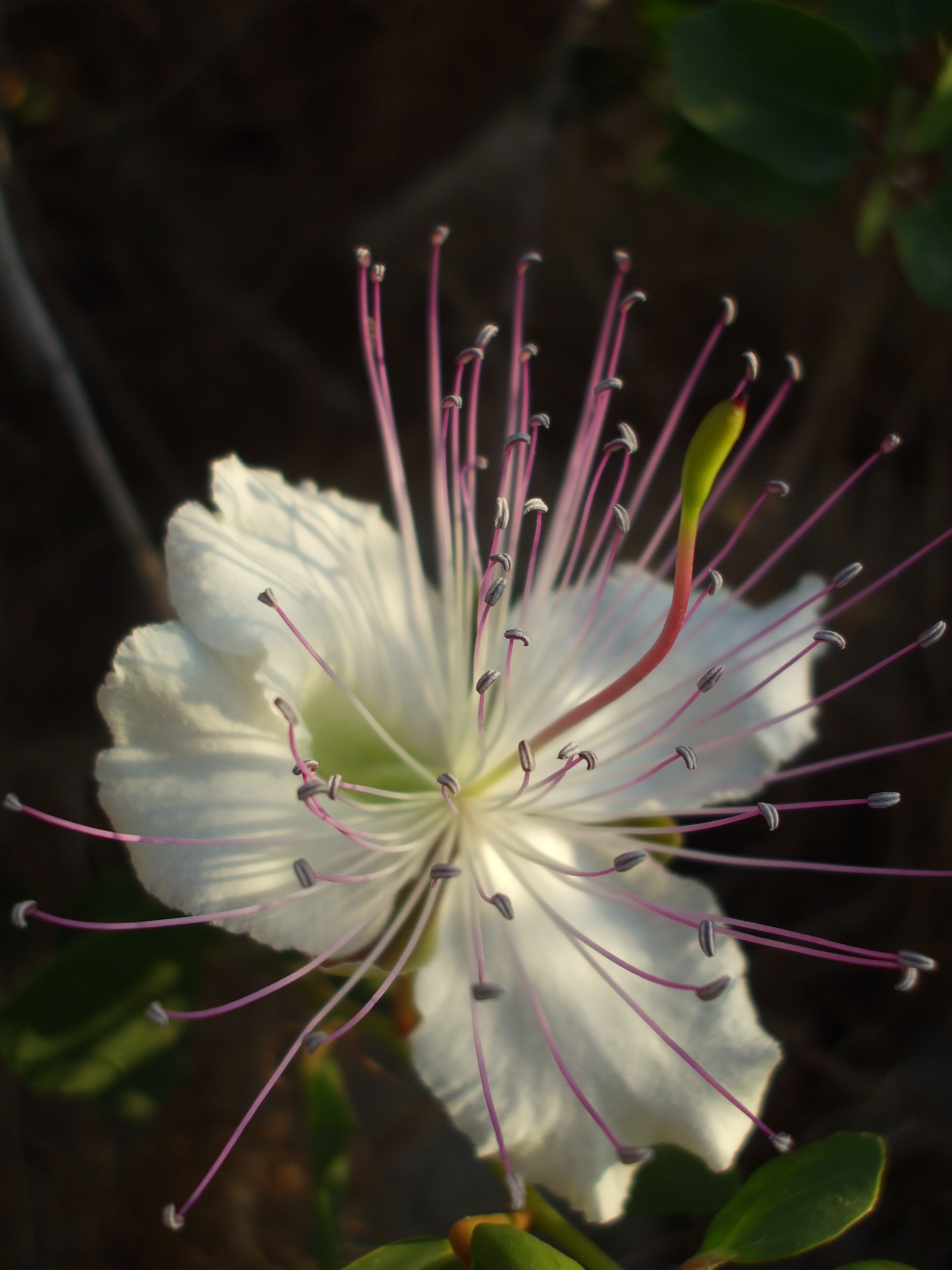
Capparis spinosa, photographed in San Ġwann, Malta.

Herkogamy (or hercogamy) is the spatial separation of the anthers and stigma in hermaphroditic angiosperms. It is a common strategy for reducing self-fertilization.

== Common forms ==
- Approach herkogamy (called "pin flowers") is displayed when the stigma is displayed above the level of the anthers. This arrangement of sex organs causes floral visitors to first contact the stigma, before removing pollen from the anthers. This form of herkogamy is considered to be common and is associated with a large, diverse fauna of floral visitors/pollinators.
- Reverse herkogamy (called "thrum flowers") is displayed when the stigma is recessed below the level of the anthers. This arrangement causes floral visitors to first contact the anthers before the stigma. For this reason, reverse herkogamy is believed to facilitate greater pollen export than approach herkogamy. This type of sex-organ arrangement is typically associated with Lepidopteran (moth or butterfly) pollination.

== See also ==
- Heterostyly
