= Heterostyly =

Two different types of flowers (style) on same plant

Flowers of Primula vulgaris

long-styled flower

short-styled flower

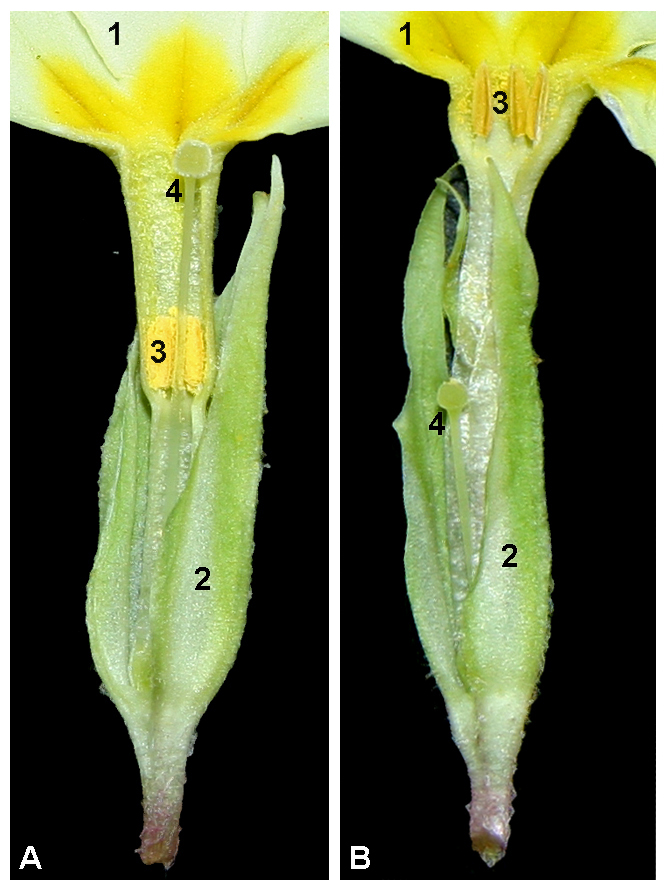
Dissection of long-styled (A) and short-styled (c) flowers:
1. Corolla (petals)
2. Calyx (sepals)
3. Stamen
4. Pistil

Heterostyly is a unique form of polymorphism and herkogamy in flowers. In a heterostylous species, two or three morphological types of flowers, termed "morphs", exist in the population. On each individual plant, all flowers share the same morph. The flower morphs differ in the lengths of the pistil and stamens, and these traits are not continuous. The morph phenotype is genetically linked to genes responsible for a unique system of self-incompatibility, termed heteromorphic self-incompatibility, that is, the pollen from a flower on one morph cannot fertilize another flower of the same morph.

Heterostylous plants having two flower morphs are termed "distylous". In one morph (termed "pin", "longistylous", or "long-styled" flower) the stamens are short and the pistils are long; in the second morph (termed "thrum", "brevistylous", or "short-styled" flower) the stamens are long and the pistils are short; the length of the pistil in one morph equals the length of the stamens in the second morph, and vice versa. Examples of distylous plants are the primrose and many other Primula species, buckwheat, flax and other Linum species, some Lythrum species, and many species of Cryptantha.

Heterostylous plants having three flower morphs are termed "tristylous". Each morph has two types of stamens. In one morph, the pistil is short, and the stamens are long and intermediate; in the second morph, the pistil is intermediate, and the stamens are short and long; in the third morph, the pistil is long, and the stamens are short and intermediate. Oxalis pes-caprae, purple loosestrife (Lythrum salicaria) and some other species of Lythrum are trimorphic.

The lengths of stamens and pistils in heterostylous flowers are adapted for pollination by different pollinators, or different body parts of the same pollinator. Thus, pollen originating in a long stamen will reach primarily long rather than short pistils, and vice versa. When pollen is transferred between two flowers of the same morph, no fertilization will take place, because of the self-incompatibility mechanism, unless such mechanism is broken by environmental factors such as flower age or temperature.

== Evolution of heterostyly ==
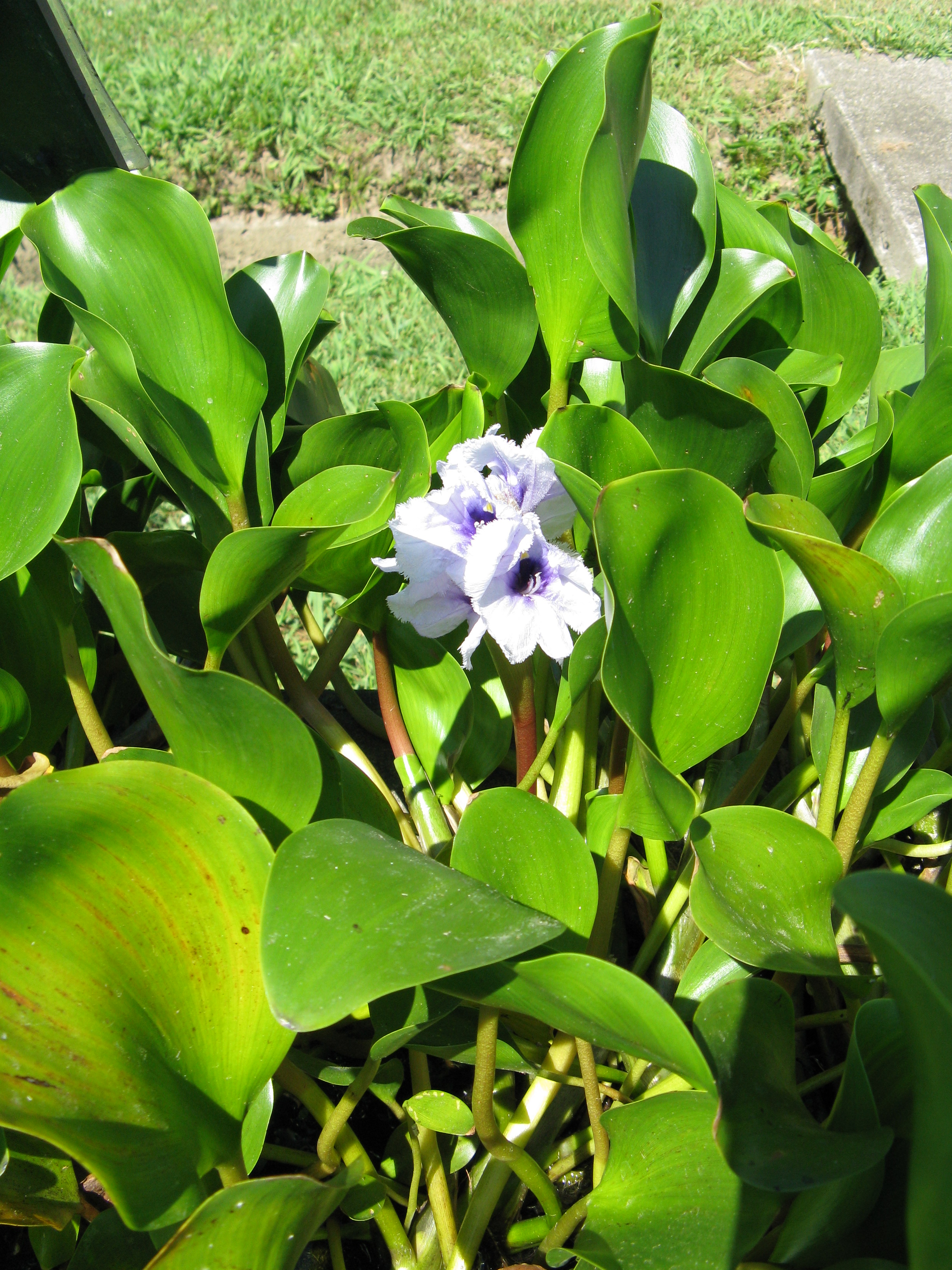
Eichhornia azurea is an example of distyly present in a family that exhibits other morphs

Heterostyly has evolved independently in over 25 different plant families, including the Oxalidaceae, Primulaceae, Pontederiaceae, and the Boraginaceae. These families do not exhibit heterostyly across all species, and some families can exhibit both mating systems, such as among species in the genus Eichhornia (Pontederiaceae). For example, Eichhornia azurea exhibits distyly, whereas another species in the same genus, Eichhornia crassipes, is tristylous.

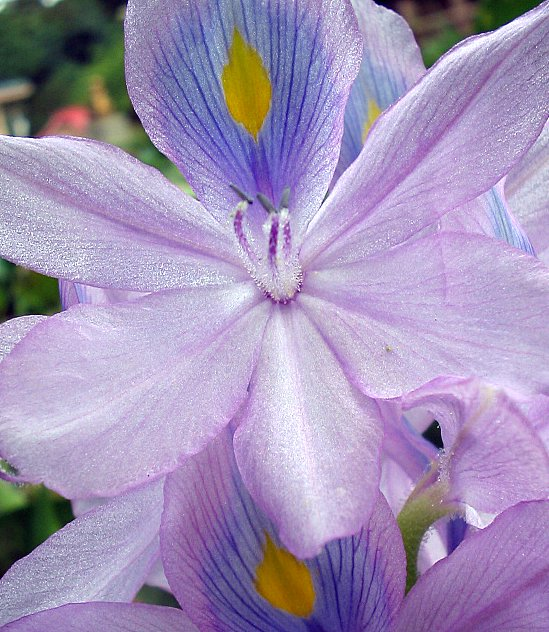
Eichhornia crassipes exhibits tristyly present in a family that exhibits other morphs

Heterostyly is thought to have evolved primarily as a mechanism to promote outcrossing. Several hypotheses have been proposed to explain the repeated independent evolution of heterostyly as opposed to homostylous self-incompatibility: 1) that heterostyly has evolved as a mechanism to reduce male gamete wastage on incompatible stigmas and to increase fitness through male function through reciprocal herkogamy; 2) heterostyly evolved as a consequence of selection for heteromorphic self-incompatibility between floral morphs in distylous and tristylous species; and, 3) that the presence of heterostyly in plants reduces the conflict that might occur between the pollen dispersal and pollen receipt functions of the flower in a homomorphic animal-pollinated species.

Heterostyly is most often seen in actinomorphic flowers presumably because zygomorphic flowers are effective in cross- pollination.

Models

Current models for evolution include the pollen transfer model and the selfing avoidance model.

The pollen transfer model proposed by Lloyd and Webb in 1992 is based on the efficacy of cross-pollen transfer, and suggests that the physical trait of reciprocal herkogamy evolved first, and then the diallelic incompatibility arose afterwards as a response to the evolution of the reciprocal herkogamy. This model is similar to Darwin's 1877 idea that reciprocal herkogamy evolved as a direct response to the selective forces that increase accuracy of pollen transfer.

The alternative model—the selfing avoidance model—was introduced by Charlesworth and Charlesworth in 1979 using a population genetic approach. The selfing avoidance model assumes that the self-incompatibility system was the first trait to evolve and that the physical attribute of reciprocal herkogamy evolved as a response to the former.

Genetic determination

The supergene model describes how the distinctive floral traits present in distylous flowers can be inherited. This model was first introduced by Ernst in 1955 and was further elaborated by Charlesworth and Charlesworth in 1979. Lewis and Jones in 1992 demonstrated that the supergene consists of three linked diallelic loci. The G locus is responsible for determining the characteristic of the gynoecium which includes the style length and incompatibility responses, the P locus determines the pollen size and the pollen's incompatibility responses, and finally the A locus determines the anther height. These three diallelic loci compose the S allele and the s alleles segregating at the supergene S locus, which is notated as GPA and gpa, respectively. There have been other propositions that there are possibly 9 loci responsible for the distyly supergene in Primula, but there has been no convincing genetic data to support this. The molecular basis of heterostyly has been elucidated in recent papers.

Additionally, supergene control is implied for tristyly, but there is no genetic evidence available to support it. A supergene model for tristyly would require the occurrence of two supergenes at the S and M loci.
