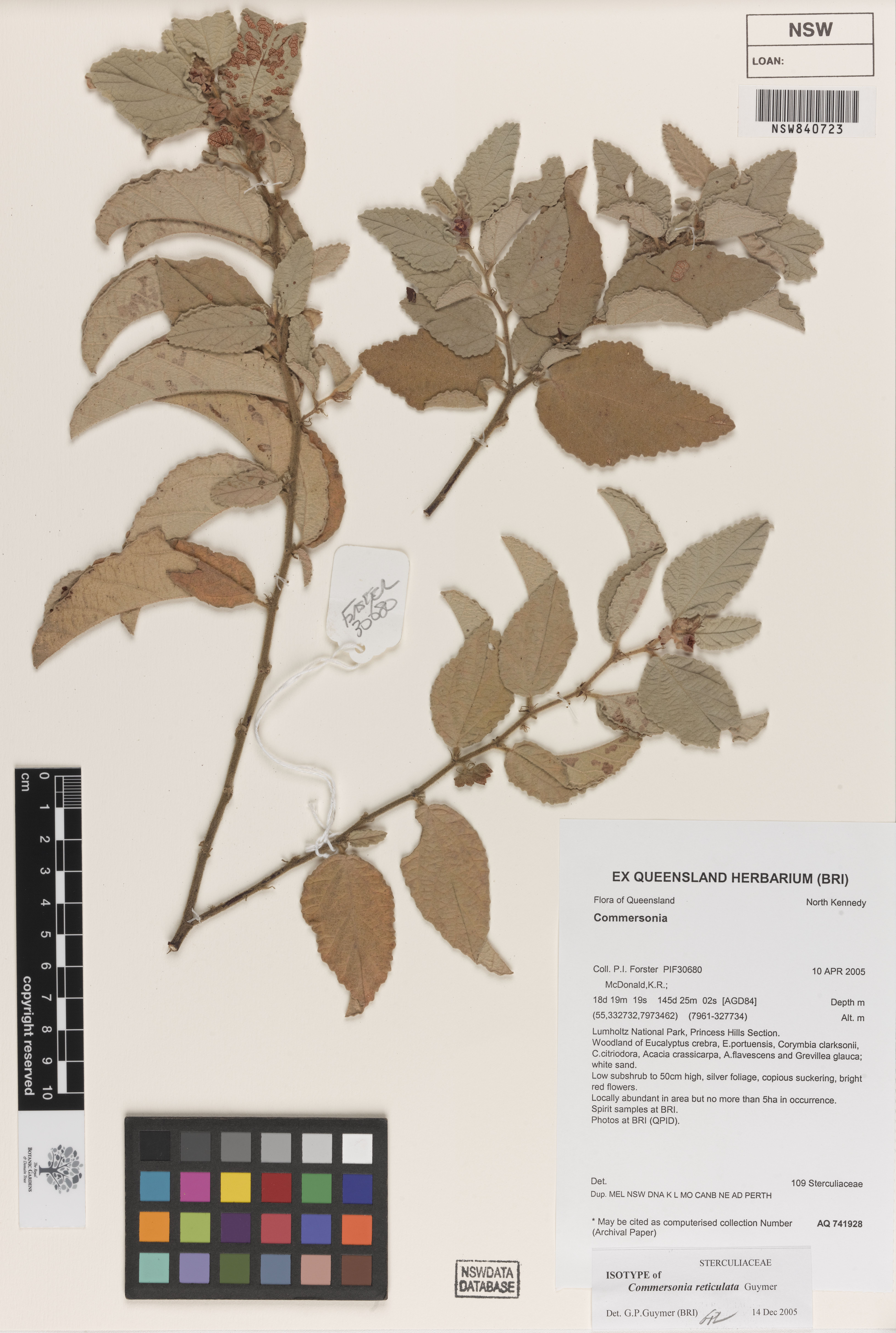
- Holotype

Conservation status
- Vulnerable (NCA)

Scientific classification
- Kingdom: Plantae
- Clade: Embryophytes
- Clade: Tracheophytes
- Clade: Spermatophytes
- Clade: Angiosperms
- Clade: Eudicots
- Clade: Rosids
- Order: Malvales
- Family: Malvaceae
- Genus: Androcalva
- Species: A. reticulata

Binomial name
- Androcalva reticulata (Guymer) C.F.Wilkins & Whitlock

Synonyms
- Commersonia reticulata Guymer

= Androcalva reticulata =

Species of shrub

Androcalva reticulata is a species of flowering plant in the family Malvaceae and is endemic to north-eastern Queensland. It is a low shrub that forms suckers, its new growth covered with star-shaped hairs, and has egg-shaped leaves with irregular teeth on the edges, and groups of two to six red flowers.

== Description ==
Androcalva reticulata is a shrub that typically grows to 0.3–1 m (1 ft 0 in – 3 ft 3 in) high, 0.6–1 m (2 ft 0 in – 3 ft 3 in) wide and forms suckers, its new growth covered with star-shaped hairs. The leaves are egg-shaped, 25–90 mm (0.98–3.54 in) long and 15–50 mm (0.59–1.97 in) wide on a petiole 4–8 mm (0.16–0.31 in) long with narrowly triangular stipules 5–8 mm (0.20–0.31 in) long at the base. The edges of the leaves have irregular teeth, and both surfaces of the leaves are covered with star-shaped hairs. The flowers are arranged in groups of two to six 10–20 mm (0.39–0.79 in) long on a peduncle 3–6 mm (0.12–0.24 in) long. Each flower is on a pedicel 2–3 mm (0.079–0.118 in) long, with bracts 4–7 mm (0.16–0.28 in) long at the base. The flowers are red, 9–11 mm (0.35–0.43 in) in diameter with 5 petal-like sepals, the lobes divided for half their length. The petals are bright red with three lobes, the centre lobe about 5 mm (0.20 in) long. Flowering mainly occurs from April to July.

== Taxonomy ==
This species was first formally described in 2005 by Gordon Guymer who gave it the name Commersonia reticulata in the journal Austrobaileya, from specimens collected in Lumholtz National Park in 2005. In 2011, Carolyn Wilkins and Barbara Whitlock transferred the species to Androcalva as A. reticulata in Australian Systematic Botany. The specific epithet (reticulata) refers to the reticulate leaf veins of this species.

== Distribution and habitat ==
Androcalva reticulata grows in woodland or open forest, from near Mount Garnet to Townsville in north-eastern Queensland.

== Conservation Status ==
Androcalva reticulata is listed as vulnerable under the Queensland Nature Conservation Act 1992.
