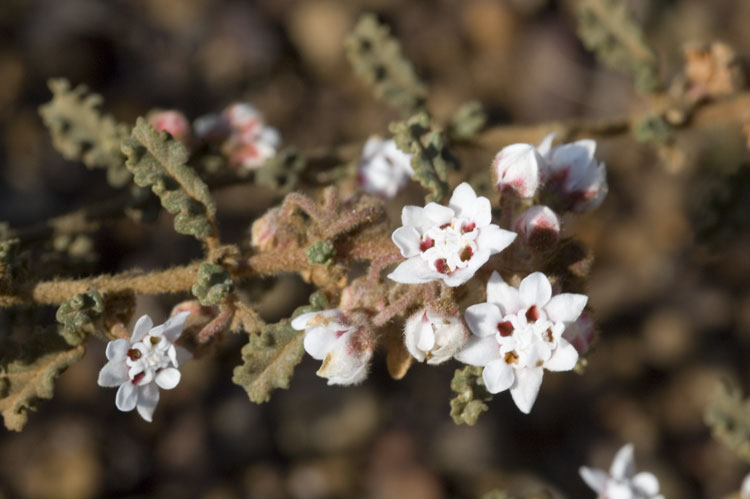
- Near Ravensthorpe

Scientific classification
- Kingdom: Plantae
- Clade: Embryophytes
- Clade: Tracheophytes
- Clade: Spermatophytes
- Clade: Angiosperms
- Clade: Eudicots
- Clade: Rosids
- Order: Malvales
- Family: Malvaceae
- Genus: Androcalva
- Species: A. crispa

Binomial name
- Androcalva crispa (Turcz.) C.F.Wilkins & Whitlock

Synonyms
- Commerconia crispa F.Muell. orth. var.; Commersonia crispa Turcz.; Commersonia crispa Turcz. var. crispa; Commersonia crispa var. minor E.Pritz.; Restiaria crispa (Turcz.) Kuntze; Rulingia crispa (Turcz.) Turcz.

= Androcalva crispa =

Species of shrub

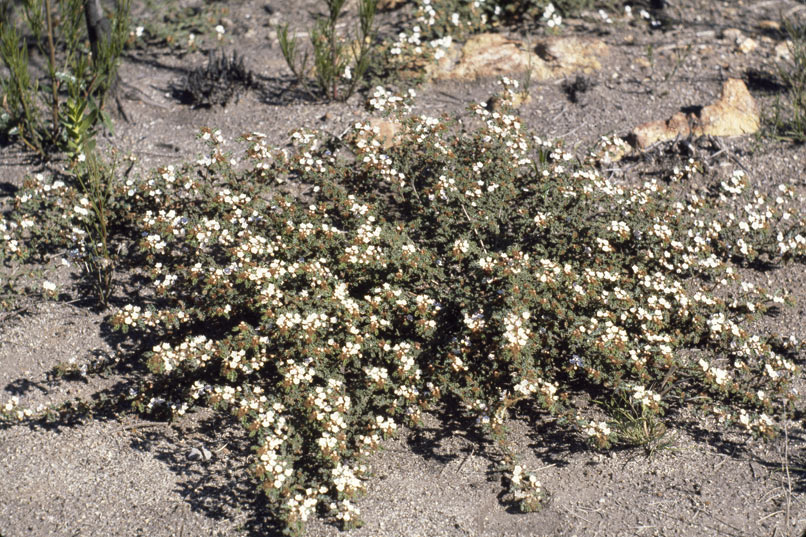
Habit

Androcalva crispa, commonly known as crisped leaf commersonia, is a species of flowering plant in the family Malvaceae and is endemic to the south-west of Western Australia. It is a prostrate shrub that forms suckers from rhizomes and has densely new growth, clusters of lobed, egg-shaped or oblong leaves with wavy, serrated edges, and groups of white and pinkish-purple flowers.

== Description ==
Androcalva crispa is a prostrate shrub that typically grows to 5–50 cm (2.0–19.7 in) high, 20–90 cm (7.9–35.4 in) wide, forms suckers from rhizomes, and has its new growth densely covered with star-shaped hairs. The leaves are clustered, egg-shaped, sometimes with the narrower end towards the base, or oblong, about 15 mm (0.59 in) long on a petiole 2–6 mm (0.079–0.236 in) long with narrowly oblong stipules at the base. The edges of the leaves are wavy with shallow, rounded teeth, the upper surface more or less glabrous and the lower surface densely covered with star-shaped hairs. The flowers are arranged in groups of 2 to 8 on a peduncle 1–3 mm (0.039–0.118 in) long, each flower on a pedicel 2–8 mm (0.079–0.315 in) long, with bracts 2–6 mm (0.079–0.236 in) long at the base. The flowers are white with a pinkish-purple centre and 6–10 mm (0.24–0.39 in) in diameter with 5 petal-like sepals, the petals with a spatula-shaped ligule almost as long as the sepal lobes. Each of the 5 staminodes has 3 lobes, the middle lobe broad and white, the side lobes linear and red. Flowering occurs from July to November.

== Taxonomy ==
This species was first formally described in 1846 by Nikolai Turczaninow who gave it the name Commersonia crispa in Bulletin de la Société Impériale des Naturalistes de Moscou, from specimens collected by James Drummond. In 2011, Carolyn Wilkins and Barbara Whitlock transferred the species to Androcalva as A. crispa in Australian Systematic Botany. The specific epithet (crispa) means "curled" or "crinkled", referring to the edges of the leaves of this species.

== Distribution and habitat ==
Crisped leaf commersonia grows in woodland, mallee, heath and sedgeland between Bremer Bay, the Fitzgerald River National Park and Ravensthorpe in the Esperance Plains and Mallee bioregion of south-western Western Australia.

== Conservation status ==
Androcalva crispa is listed as "not threatened" by the Western Australian Government Department of Biodiversity, Conservation and Attractions.
