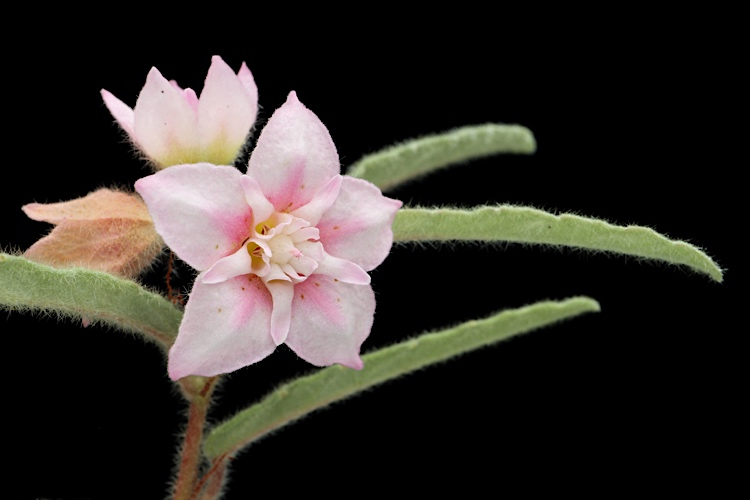
- In the Australian National Botanic Gardens

Scientific classification
- Kingdom: Plantae
- Clade: Embryophytes
- Clade: Tracheophytes
- Clade: Spermatophytes
- Clade: Angiosperms
- Clade: Eudicots
- Clade: Rosids
- Order: Malvales
- Family: Malvaceae
- Genus: Androcalva
- Species: A. johnsonii

Binomial name
- Androcalva johnsonii (Guymer) C.F.Wilkins & Whitlock

Synonyms
- Commersonia johnsonii Guymer; Commersonia sp. (Zamia Range R.W.Johnson 1398)

= Androcalva johnsonii =

Species of shrub

Androcalva johnsonii is a species of flowering plant in the family Malvaceae and is endemic to central Queensland. It is a low, spreading shrub that has hairy young branches, narrowly egg-shaped or oblong leaves with rounded teeth, and small groups of white to pale pink flowers.

== Description ==
Androcalva johnsonii is a low spreading shrub that typically grows to 0.3–1 m (1 ft 0 in – 3 ft 3 in) high and 1 m (3 ft 3 in) wide, its branches covered with yellowish, star-shaped hairs. The leaves are narrowly egg-shaped to oblong, 10–100 mm (0.39–3.94 in) long and 3–20 mm (0.12–0.79 in) wide on a petiole 1–12 mm (0.039–0.472 in) long with narrowly triangular stipules 2–9 mm (0.079–0.354 in) long at the base. The edges of the leaves have well-spaced, rounded lobes and are curved down, both surfaces of the leaves covered with white or yellowish, star-shaped hairs. The flowers are arranged in groups of 2 to 4 on a peduncle 1–4 mm (0.039–0.157 in) long, each flower on a pedicel 1–5 mm (0.039–0.197 in) long, with linear bracts 2–10 mm (0.079–0.394 in) long at the base. The flowers are white to pale pink and 14–17 mm (0.55–0.67 in) in diameter with 5 petal-like sepals, the lobes 4–6 mm (0.16–0.24 in) long. The petals are 5.5–6.5 mm (0.22–0.26 in) long, the ligules pink and shorter than the sepal lobes and with 3 lobes, the middle lobe egg-shaped. Flowering occurs sporadically between June and September.

== Taxonomy ==
This species was first formally described in 2006 by Gordon Guymer who gave it the name Commersonia johnsonii in the journal Austrobaileya from specimens collected near Springsure in 1960. In 2011, Carolyn Wilkins and Barbara Whitlock transferred the species to Androcalva as A. johnsonii in Australian Systematic Botany. The specific epithet (johnsonii) honours Robert William Johnson, who collected the type specimens of this species.

== Distribution and habitat ==
Androcalva johnsonii grows as an undershrub in woodland and shrubland on rocky hillsides on the Zamia Range in Minerva Hills National Park in central Queensland.
