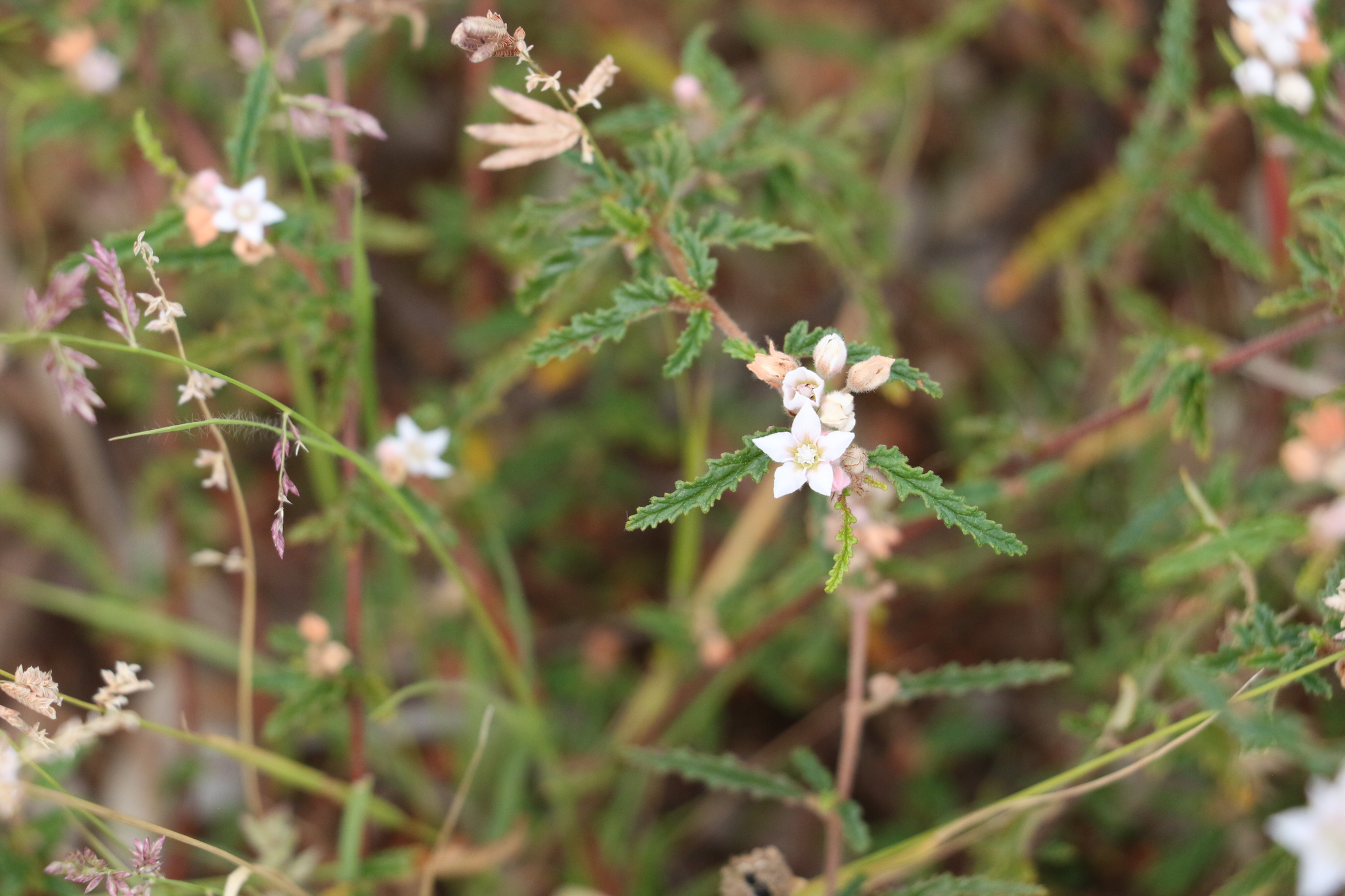
- Near Gurulmundi

Scientific classification
- Kingdom: Plantae
- Clade: Embryophytes
- Clade: Tracheophytes
- Clade: Spermatophytes
- Clade: Angiosperms
- Clade: Eudicots
- Clade: Rosids
- Order: Malvales
- Family: Malvaceae
- Genus: Androcalva
- Species: A. pedleyi

Binomial name
- Androcalva pedleyi (Guymer) C.F.Wilkins & Whitlock

Synonyms
- Commersonia pedleyi Guymer; Rulingia mutabilis Sked nom. inval., pro syn.; Rulingia sp. (Westmar L.Pedley 518); Rulingia sp. Q1

= Androcalva pedleyi =

Species of shrub

Androcalva pedleyi is a species of flowering plant in the family Malvaceae and is endemic to south-eastern Queensland. It is low, spreading or prostrate shrub that forms suckers and has softly-hairy new growth, linear to lance-shaped leaves with lobes on the edges, and groups of 7 to 10 white, later pink flowers.

== Description ==
Androcalva pedleyi is a spreading or prostrate shrub that typically grows to 60 cm (24 in) high and 20–150 cm (7.9–59.1 in) wide, its new growth covered with soft, golden hairs. The leaves are linear to lance-shaped, 20–70 mm (0.79–2.76 in) long and 4–40 mm (0.16–1.57 in) wide on a petiole 2–5 mm (0.079–0.197 in) long with linear stipules 2–5 mm (0.079–0.197 in) long at the base. The edges of the leaves have 5 to 16 pairs of lobes 1–4 mm (0.039–0.157 in) long on the edges, the upper surface of the leaves with a few soft hairs and the lower side moderately densely covered with soft, star-shaped hairs. The flowers are arranged in groups of 7 to 10 10–23 mm (0.39–0.91 in) long on a peduncle 4–5 mm (0.16–0.20 in) long. Each flower is on a pedicel 1–3 mm (0.039–0.118 in) long, with bracts 2–9 mm (0.079–0.354 in) long at the base. The flowers are white at first, later pink, 6–7 mm (0.24–0.28 in) in diameter with 5 petal-like sepals, the lobes 3.0–3.5 mm (0.12–0.14 in) long and 2.5–3.2 mm (0.098–0.126 in) wide. The petals are white, 4.0–5.5 mm (0.16–0.22 in) long, and there are 3 staminodes between each pair of stamens. Flowering occurs from August to April.

== Taxonomy ==
This species was first formally described in 2005 by Gordon Guymer who gave it the name Commersonia pedleyi in the journal Austrobaileya, from specimens collected by Leslie Pedley near Westmar in 1959. In 2011, Carolyn Wilkins and Barbara Whitlock transferred the species to Androcalva as A. pedleyi in Australian Systematic Botany. The specific epithet (pedleyi) honours the collector of the type specimens, who recognised that the species was new to science.

== Distribution and habitat ==
Androcalva pedleyi grows in woodland or open forest, sometimes on roadsides, from near Gurulmundi to east of St George in south-eastern Queensland.
