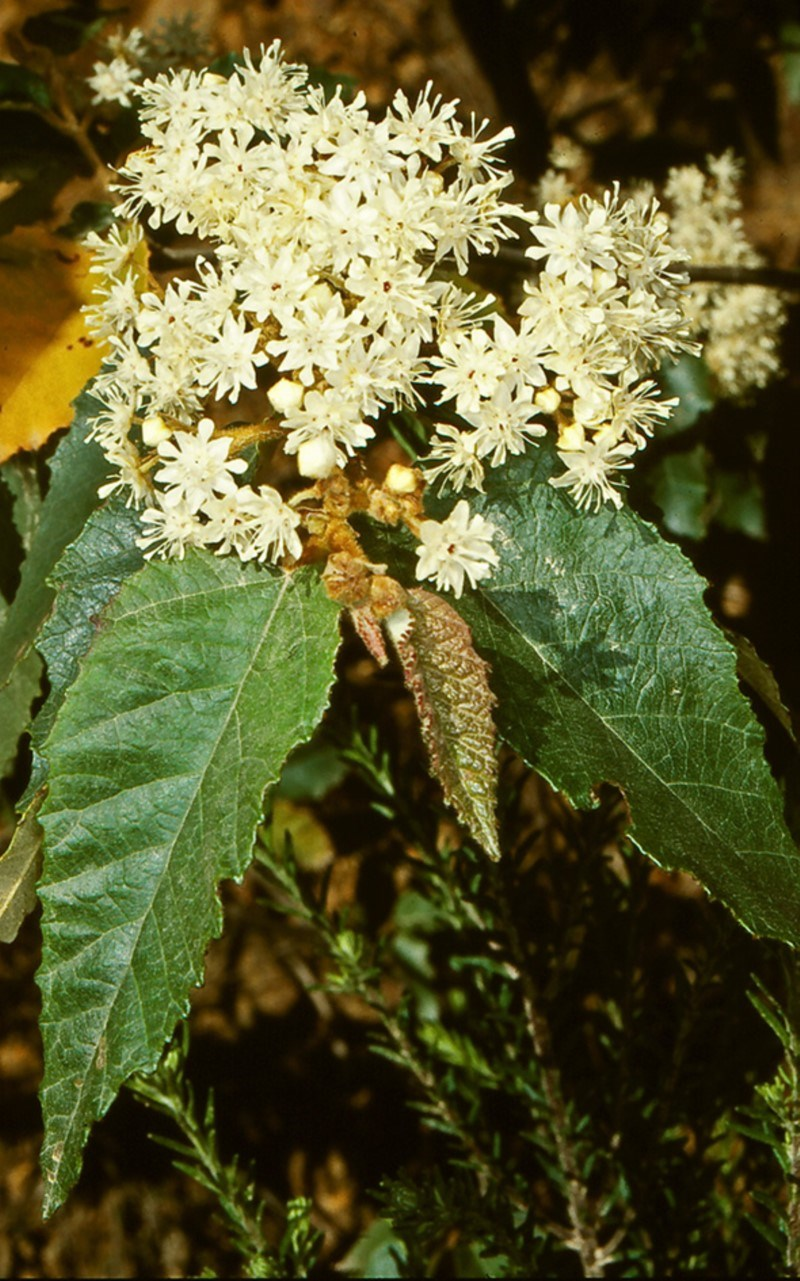
- In Mimosa Rocks National Park

Scientific classification
- Kingdom: Plantae
- Clade: Embryophytes
- Clade: Tracheophytes
- Clade: Spermatophytes
- Clade: Angiosperms
- Clade: Eudicots
- Clade: Rosids
- Order: Malvales
- Family: Malvaceae
- Genus: Androcalva
- Species: A. rossii

Binomial name
- Androcalva rossii (Guymer) C.F.Wilkins & Whitlock

Synonyms
- Commersonia rossii Guymer; Commersonia sp. 1; Commersonia sp. Blackfellows' Hemp; Commersonia sp. aff. fraseri; Commersonia fraseri auct. non J.Gay: Willis, J.H. (1973); Commersonia fraseri auct. non J.Gay: Forbes, S.J. & Ross, J.H. (April 1988); Commersonia fraseri auct. non J.Gay: Ross, J.H. in Ross, J.H. (ed.) (March 1990)

= Androcalva rossii =

Species of shrub

Androcalva rossii, commonly known as native hemp, is a species of flowering plant in the family Malvaceae and is endemic to south-eastern Australia. It is spindly shrub or small tree that forms suckers, its branchlets covered with star-shaped hairs, and has egg-shaped leaves with irregular teeth on the edges, and groups of 18 to 60 white or cream-coloured flowers.

== Description ==
Androcalva rossii is a spindly shrub or small tree that typically grows to 4–10 m (13–33 ft) high, 2–6 m (6 ft 7 in – 19 ft 8 in) wide and forms suckers, its new growth covered with rust-coloured, woolly, star-shaped hairs. The leaves are egg-shaped, 65–250 mm (2.6–9.8 in) long and 28–150 mm (1.1–5.9 in) wide on a petiole 9–20 mm (0.35–0.79 in) long with triangular stipules 3–10 mm (0.12–0.39 in) long at the base. The edges of the leaves have irregular teeth, and both surfaces of the leaves are covered with star-shaped hairs, densely so on the lower surface. The flowers are arranged in groups of 18 to 60, 35–90 mm (1.4–3.5 in) long on a peduncle 5–22 mm (0.20–0.87 in) long. Each flower is on a pedicel 3–8 mm (0.12–0.31 in) long, with bracts 2–10 mm (0.079–0.394 in) long at the base. The flowers are white or cream-coloured, 9–11 mm (0.35–0.43 in) in diameter with 5 petal-like, sometimes pale pink sepals, the lobes 3.5–4.5 mm (0.14–0.18 in) long. The petals are white with three lobes, and the staminodes also have three lobes that are longer than the sepal lobes. Flowering occurs from August to January.

== Taxonomy ==
This species was first formally described in 2005 by Gordon Guymer who gave it the name Commersonia rossii in the journal Austrobaileya, from specimens collected in 1985 by David Albrecht near Lochiel, west of Pambula. In 2011, Carolyn Wilkins and Barbara Whitlock transferred the species to Androcalva as A. rossii in Australian Systematic Botany. The specific epithet (rossii) honours "Dr Jim Ross, Chiel Botanist, National Herbarium of Victoria".

== Distribution and habitat ==
Androcalva rossii grows in forest and on rainforest margins from near Sydney in New South Wales to far eastern Victoria.
