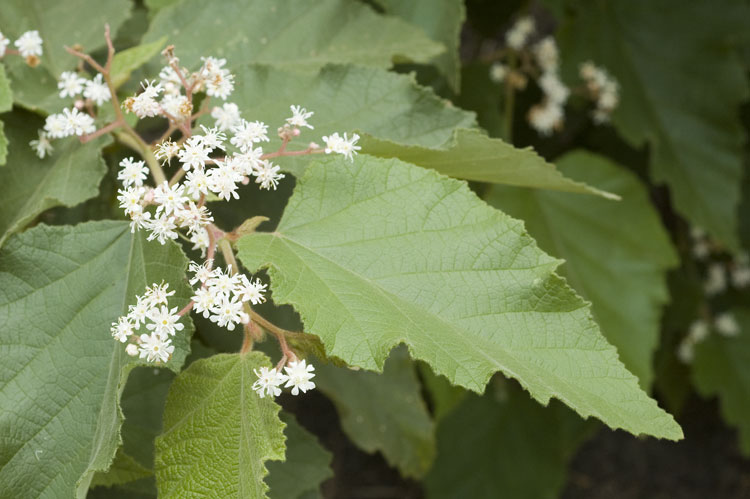

Scientific classification
- Kingdom: Plantae
- Clade: Embryophytes
- Clade: Tracheophytes
- Clade: Spermatophytes
- Clade: Angiosperms
- Clade: Eudicots
- Clade: Rosids
- Order: Malvales
- Family: Malvaceae
- Genus: Androcalva
- Species: A. viscidula

Binomial name
- Androcalva viscidula (Guymer) C.F.Wilkins & Whitlock

Synonyms
- Commersonia sp. (Mt Tinbeerwah G.P.Guymer 1786); Commersonia sp. 1; Commersonia viscidula Guymer

= Androcalva viscidula =

Species of shrub

Androcalva viscidula is a species of flowering plant in the family Malvaceae and is endemic to eastern Australia. It is a spreading shrub that forms suckers, its new stems densely hairy, and has egg-shaped leaves, sometimes with irregular teeth on the edges, and groups of 22 to 28 white flowers.

== Description ==
Androcalva viscidula is a spreading shrub that typically grows to 1–3 m (3 ft 3 in – 9 ft 10 in) high, 1–2 m (3 ft 3 in – 6 ft 7 in) wide, is sticky to touch and forms suckers, its new growth covered with star-shaped and red-tipped glandular hairs. The leaves are egg-shaped, 10–110 mm (0.39–4.33 in) long and 10–55 mm (0.39–2.17 in) wide on a petiole 3–12 mm (0.12–0.47 in) long with narrowly triangular stipules 3–9 mm (0.12–0.35 in) long at the base. The edges of the leaves sometimes have irregular teeth, and both surfaces of the leaves are covered with star-shaped and glandular hairs. The flowers are arranged in cymes of 22 to 28, 35–80 mm (1.4–3.1 in) long on a peduncle 6–35 mm (0.24–1.38 in) long. Each flower is on a pedicel 4–7 mm (0.16–0.28 in) long, with lance-shaped bracts 3–7 mm (0.12–0.28 in) long at the base. The flowers are white, 5–8 mm (0.20–0.31 in) in diameter with 5 petal-like sepals covered with star-shaped and glandular hairs. The petals are white to cream-coloured with three lobes, the centre lobe spatula-shaped and the side lobes form a cup around the anthers. Flowering occurs from August to February.

== Taxonomy ==
This species was first formally described in 2005 by Gordon Guymer who gave it the name Commersonia viscidula in the journal Austrobaileya, from specimens he collected on Mount Tinbeerwah in 1981. In 2011, Carolyn Wilkins and Barbara Whitlock transferred the species to Androcalva as A. viscidula in Australian Systematic Botany. The specific epithet (viscidula) refers to the sticky branchlets, leaves and flower parts of this species.

== Distribution and habitat ==
Androcalva viscidula grows in a variety of habitat from heathland to forest, from the Woowoonga Range in south-eastern Queensland to Bulga on the Central Coast of New South Wales.
