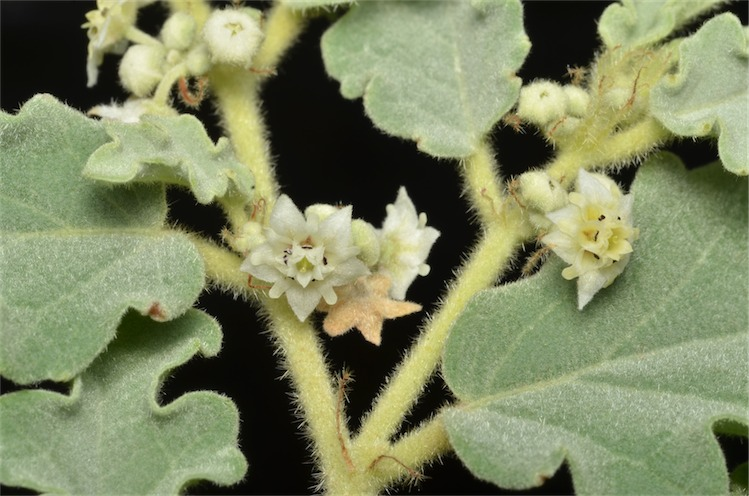
- In the Australian National Botanic Gardens

Scientific classification
- Kingdom: Plantae
- Clade: Embryophytes
- Clade: Tracheophytes
- Clade: Spermatophytes
- Clade: Angiosperms
- Clade: Eudicots
- Clade: Rosids
- Order: Malvales
- Family: Malvaceae
- Genus: Androcalva
- Species: A. leichhardtii

Binomial name
- Androcalva leichhardtii (Benth.) C.F.Wilkins & Whitlock

Synonyms
- Commerconia leichhardtii F.Muell. orth. var.; Commersonia leichhardtii Benth.; Restiaria leichhardtii (Benth.) Kuntze

= Androcalva leichhardtii =

Species of shrub

Androcalva leichhardtii is a species of flowering plant in the family Malvaceae and is endemic to central Queensland. It is a small shrub with hairy new growth, wrinkled, egg-shaped to lance-shaped leaves with irregular serrations on the edges, and small groups of yellow flowers.

== Description ==
Androcalva leichhardtii is a small, open shrub that forms suckers and typically grows to 60 cm (24 in) high and wide, its new growth covered with fine, white, star-shaped hairs. The leaves are egg-shaped to lance-shaped, 20–100 mm (0.79–3.94 in) long and 5–20 mm (0.20–0.79 in) wide on a petiole 4–12 mm (0.16–0.47 in) long with narrowly egg-shaped stipules 2–13 mm (0.079–0.512 in) long at the base. The edges of the leaves have irregular serrations, the leaf veins give the leaves a wrinkled appearance, and both surfaces are densely covered with star-shaped hairs. The flowers are arranged in groups of 2 to 5 on a peduncle 4–5 mm (0.16–0.20 in) long, each flower on a pedicel 1–4 mm (0.039–0.157 in) long, with linear bracts 2–8 mm (0.079–0.315 in) long at the base. The flowers are yellow and 12–15 mm (0.47–0.59 in) in diameter with 5 petal-like sepals, the lobes 9–10 mm (0.35–0.39 in) long. The petals are bright yellow, 4–5 mm (0.16–0.20 in) long, the ligules with 3 lobes, the middle lobe egg-shaped and the side-lobes enveloping the stamens. Flowering occurs in March, June and November.

== Taxonomy ==
This species was first formally described in 1863 by George Bentham who gave it the name Commersonia leichhardtii in Flora Australiensis from specimens collected near the "Head of Boyd river" by Ludwig Leichhardt. In 2011, Carolyn Wilkins and Barbara Whitlock transferred the species to Androcalva as A. leichhardtii in Australian Systematic Botany.

== Distribution and habitat ==
Androcalva leichhardtii grows as an undershrub under eucalypts on stony hills and ridges from near Taroom to near Chinchilla in central Queensland.
