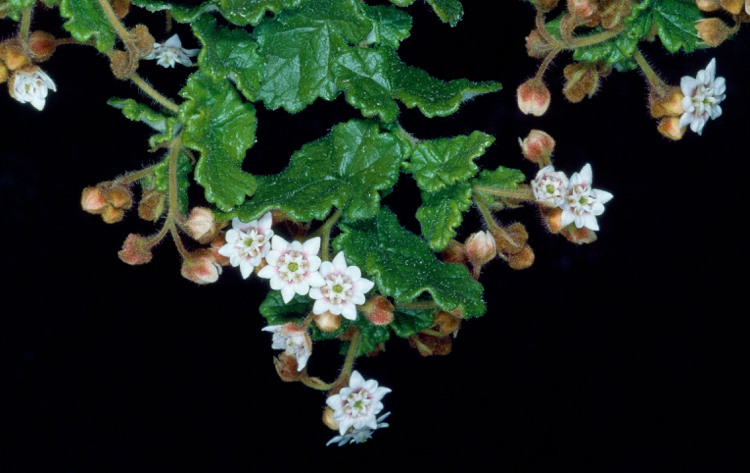
- In the Australian National Botanic Gardens

Scientific classification
- Kingdom: Plantae
- Clade: Embryophytes
- Clade: Tracheophytes
- Clade: Spermatophytes
- Clade: Angiosperms
- Clade: Eudicots
- Clade: Rosids
- Order: Malvales
- Family: Malvaceae
- Genus: Androcalva
- Species: A. gaudichaudii

Binomial name
- Androcalva gaudichaudii (J.Gay) C.F.Wilkins & Whitlock

Synonyms
- List: Commerconia gaudichaudi F.Muell. orth. var.; Commersonia gaudichaudi DC. orth. var.; Commersonia gaudichaudii J.Gay; Rulingia pauciflora Turcz.

= Androcalva gaudichaudii =

Species of tree

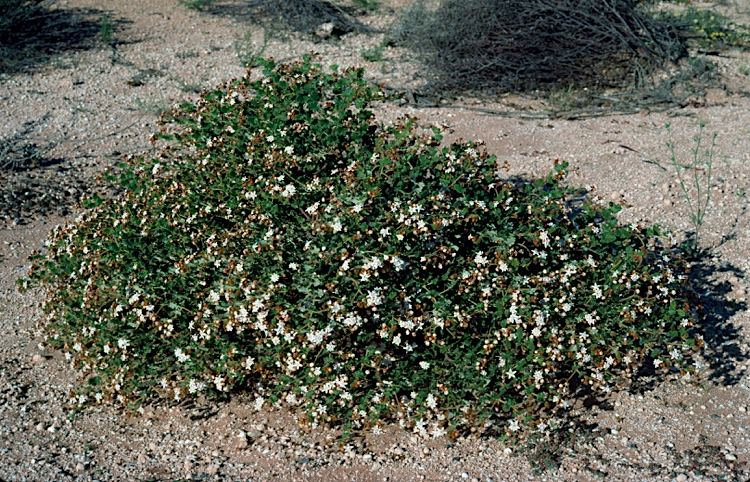
Habit near Denham

Androcalva gaudichaudii is a species of flowering plant in the family Malvaceae and is endemic to the far west of Western Australia. It is a low, dense shrub that forms suckers and has broadly oval leaves with a heart-shaped base, and clusters of 2 to 11 white flowers.

== Description ==
Androcalva gaudichaudii is a dense shrub that typically grows up to 0.8 m (2 ft 7 in) high and 1 m (3 ft 3 in) wide, and forms suckersr. The leaves are asymmetrical, broadly oval with a heart-shaped base, 5–25 mm (0.20–0.98 in) long and 5–20 mm (0.20–0.79 in) wide on a petiole 1–4 mm (0.039–0.157 in) long with stipules 3–9 mm (0.12–0.35 in) long at the base. The edges of the leaves are irregularly lobed, the upper surface is glossy and sparsely hairy, the lower surface densely covered with mostly star-shaped hairs. The flowers are white, arranged in clusters of 2 to 11 on a peduncle 7–23 mm (0.28–0.91 in) long, each flower on a pedicel 2–5 mm (0.079–0.197 in) long, with bracts 2–4 mm (0.079–0.157 in) long at the base. The flowers are 8–10 mm (0.31–0.39 in) wide with 5 white, petal-like sepals and 5 petals, the ligule much shorter than the sepals. There is a single staminode between each pair of stamens, the central one spatula-shaped and the other two linear. Flowering occurs from July to December and in March, and the fruit is a bristly capsule 10–20 mm (0.39–0.79 in) in diameter.

== Taxonomy ==
This species was first formally described in 1823 by Jaques Étienne Gay who gave it the name Commersonia gaudichaudii in the Mémoires du Muséum d'histoire naturelle, from specimens collected by Charles Gaudichaud-Beaupré. In 2011, Carolyn Wilkins and Barbara Whitlock transferred the species to Androcalva as A. gaudichaudii in Australian Systematic Botany. The specific epithet (gaudichaudii) honours Gaudichaud-Beaupré, a botanist on the Freycinet expedition.

== Distribution and habitat ==
Androcalva gaudichaudii mostly grows as an undershrub in heath between Shark Bay and Yuna in the Carnarvon, Geraldton Sandplains and Yalgoo bioregions of far western Western Australia.

== Conservation status ==
Androcalva gaudichaudii is listed as "not threatened" by the Government of Western Australia Department of Biodiversity, Conservation and Attractions.
