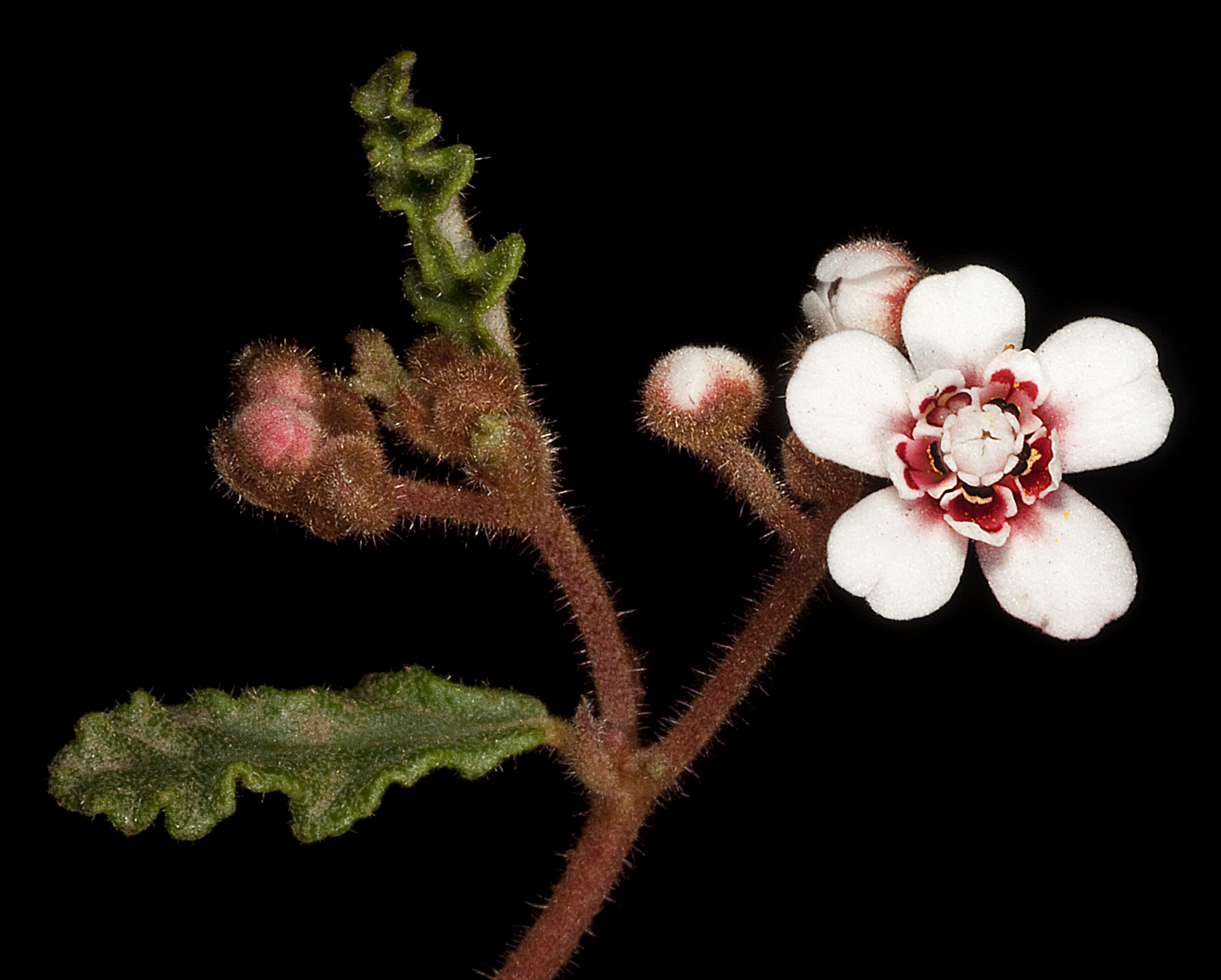

Scientific classification
- Kingdom: Plantae
- Clade: Embryophytes
- Clade: Tracheophytes
- Clade: Spermatophytes
- Clade: Angiosperms
- Clade: Eudicots
- Clade: Rosids
- Order: Malvales
- Family: Malvaceae
- Genus: Androcalva
- Species: A. pulchella

Binomial name
- Androcalva pulchella (Turcz.) C.F.Wilkins & Whitlock

Synonyms
- Commerconia pulchella F.Muell. orth. var.; Commersonia pulchella Turcz.; Restiaria pulchella (Turcz.) Kuntze; Rulingia pulchella (Turcz.) Turcz.

= Androcalva pulchella =

Species of flowering plant

Androcalva pulchella is a species of flowering plant in the family Malvaceae and is endemic to the south-west of Western Australia. It is a small shrub with egg-shaped, elliptic or oblong leaves, the edges wavy, lobed or toothed, and clusters of two to seven white and deep pink flowers.

== Description ==
Androcalva pulchella is a shrub that typically grows to 0.5–1.5 m (1 ft 8 in – 4 ft 11 in) high and 0.5–1 m (1 ft 8 in – 3 ft 3 in) wide, its young branches covered with rust-coloured, star-shaped and glandular hairs. Its leaves are egg-shaped, elliptic or oblong, 1–22 mm (0.039–0.866 in) long and 1–9 mm (0.039–0.354 in) wide on a petiole about 4 mm (0.16 in) long with narrowly triangular stipules 1–6 mm (0.039–0.236 in) long at the base. The edges of the leaves are wavy with lobes or coarse teeth. The flowers are arranged in cymes of two to seven on a peduncle 3–12 mm (0.12–0.47 in) long, each flower on a pedicel 3–14 mm (0.12–0.55 in) long, with bracts 1–5 mm (0.039–0.197 in) long at the base. The flowers are about 15 mm (0.59 in) in diameter with 5 white, petal-like sepals with and 5 small white, cup-shaped petals with a deep pink base. There are branched staminodes between each pair of stamens. Flowering occurs from July to November and the fruit is a spherical capsule 6–10 mm (0.24–0.39 in) in diameter and covered with bristles and star-shaped hairs.

== Taxonomy ==
This species was first formally described in 1846 by Nikolai Turczaninow who gave it the name as Commersonia pulchella in the Bulletin de la Société Impériale des Naturalistes de Moscou, from specimens collected by James Drummond. In 2011, Carolyn Wilkins and Barbara Whitlock transferred the species to Androcalva as A. pulchella in Australian Systematic Botany. The specific epithet (pulchella) means "beautiful and small".

== Distribution and habitat ==
Androcalva pulchella grows in heath and mallee between Green Head, Perth and inland to Wongan Hills in the Avon Wheatbelt, Geraldton Sandplains and Jarrah Forest bioregions of south-western Western Australia.

== Conservation status ==
Androcalva pulchella is listed as "not threatened" by the Western Australian Government Department of Biodiversity, Conservation and Attractions.
