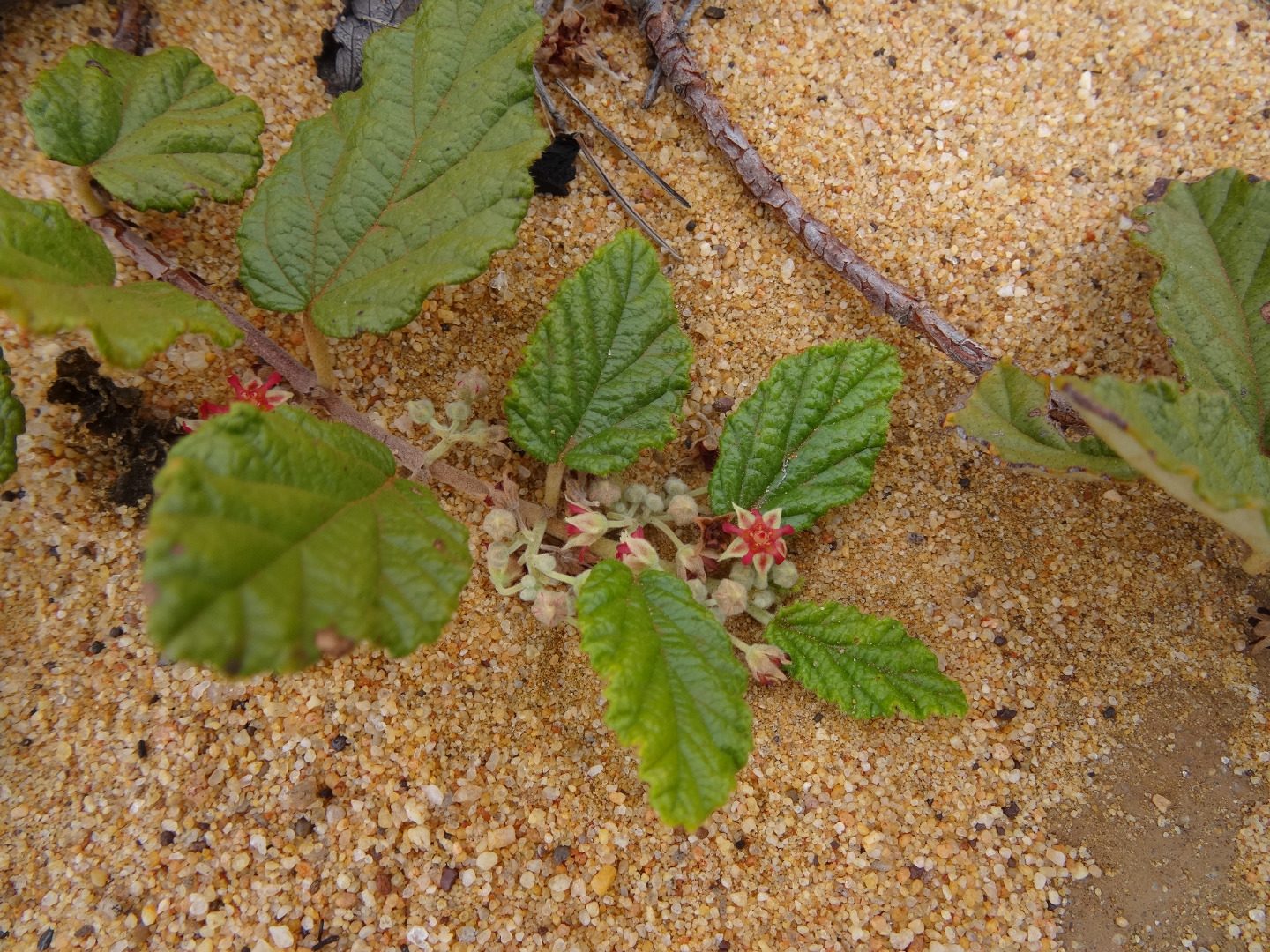
- In Plumridge Lakes Nature Reserve

Scientific classification
- Kingdom: Plantae
- Clade: Embryophytes
- Clade: Tracheophytes
- Clade: Spermatophytes
- Clade: Angiosperms
- Clade: Eudicots
- Clade: Rosids
- Order: Malvales
- Family: Malvaceae
- Genus: Androcalva
- Species: A. melanopetala

Binomial name
- Androcalva melanopetala (F.Muell.) C.F.Wilkins & Whitlock

Synonyms
- Commerconia melanopetala F.Muell. orth. var.; Commersonia melanopetala F.Muell.; Restiaria melanopetala (F.Muell.) Kuntze

= Androcalva melanopetala =

Species of shrub

Androcalva melanopetala is a species of flowering plant in the family Malvaceae and is endemic to southern inland Western Australia. It is a sometimes prostrate shrub that has densely hairy new growth, egg-shaped to elliptic leaves with rounded teeth on the edges, and clusters of white or cream-coloured and pink to red flowers.

== Description ==
Androcalva melanopetala is a shrub that typically grows to 50 cm (20 in) high and 100 cm (39 in) wide but is sometimes prostrate, its new growth densely covered with golden hairs. The leaves are egg-shaped to elliptic, 15–30 mm (0.59–1.18 in) long and 5–28 mm (0.20–1.10 in) wide on a petiole 5–8 mm (0.20–0.31 in) long with narrowly triangular stipules 2–5 mm (0.079–0.197 in) long at the base. The edges of the leaves are rolled under and have rounded teeth, the upper surface with impressed veins and the lower surface densely covered with greyish-white hairs. The flowers are arranged in groups of 5 to 21 on a peduncle 1–4 mm (0.039–0.157 in) long, each flower 6–8 mm (0.24–0.31 in) in diameter, on a pedicel 2.5–4 mm (0.098–0.157 in) long, with bracts 2–3 mm (0.079–0.118 in) long at the base. The flowers have 5 white to cream-coloured, petal-like sepals, the petals pink to red with a broadly egg-shaped ligule shorter than the sepal lobes. There is a single red, 3-lobed staminode between each pair of stamens. Flowering occurs from September to January.

== Taxonomy ==
This species was first formally described in 1876 by Ferdinand von Mueller who gave it the name Commersonia melanopetala in his Fragmenta Phytographiae Australiae, from specimens collected by Jess Young near "Victoria-Springs". In 2011, Carolyn Wilkins and Barbara Whitlock transferred the species to Androcalva as A. melanopetala in Australian Systematic Botany. The specific epithet (melanopetala) means "black petals", referring to the petals that age to purplish-black.

== Distribution and habitat ==
This androcalva grows in mallee and grassland, on sand dunes and sand plains in the Great Victoria Desert between Cundeelee, Plumridge Lakes and Queen Victoria Spring Nature Reserve in the Coolgardie and Great Victoria Desert bioregions of southern inland Western Australia.

== Conservation status ==
Androcalva melanopetala is listed as "not threatened" by the Western Australian Government Department of Biodiversity, Conservation and Attractions.
