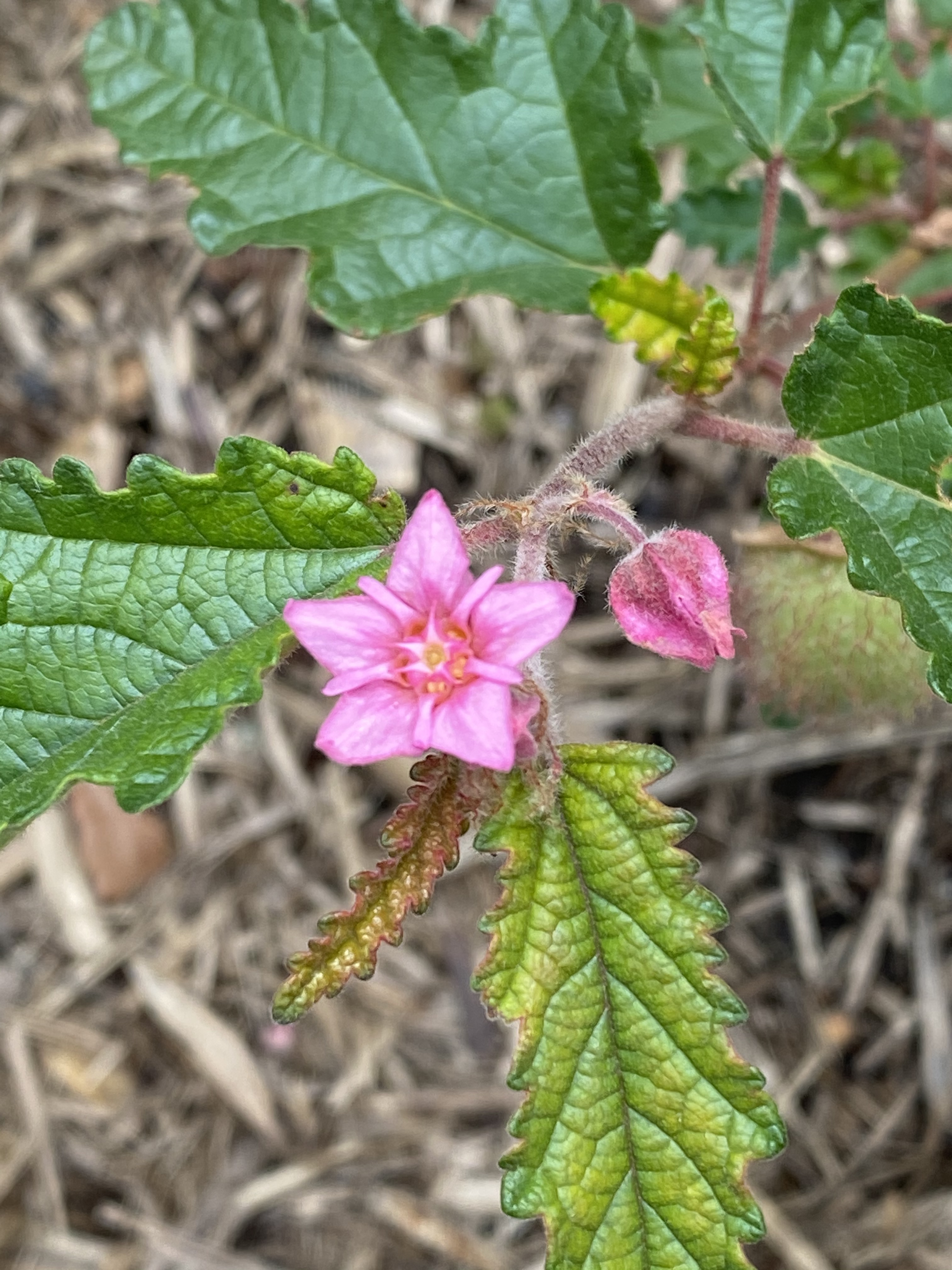
- Androcalva rosea, in Bowral

Conservation status
- Endangered (EPBC Act)

Scientific classification
- Kingdom: Plantae
- Clade: Tracheophytes
- Clade: Angiosperms
- Clade: Eudicots
- Clade: Rosids
- Order: Malvales
- Family: Malvaceae
- Genus: Androcalva
- Species: A. rosea

Binomial name
- Androcalva rosea (S.A.J.Bell & L.M.Copel.) C.F.Wilkins & Whitlock

= Androcalva rosea =

Species of flowering plant

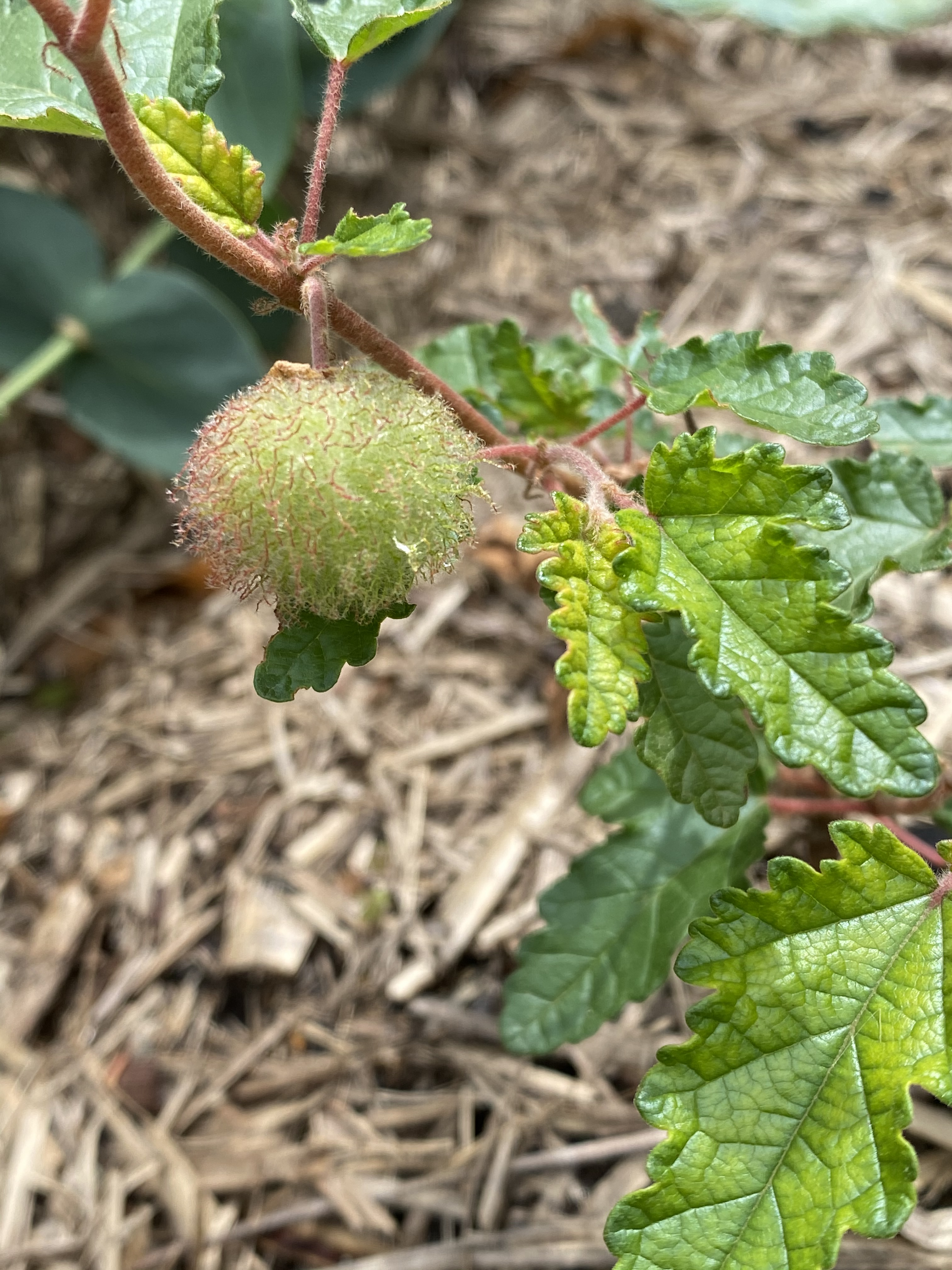
Fruit and foliage

Androcalva rosea, commonly known as Sandy Hollow commersonia, is a small endangered shrub with pink flowers and prostrate trailing branches. It is only known from four locations in the Hunter Valley of New South Wales.

== Description ==
Androcalva rosea is a small, mostly prostrate shrub 0.1–0.3 m (3.9 in – 11.8 in) high with branches up to 60 cm (24 in) long. The branches are thickly covered with star-shaped hairs, especially on new growth, later nearly hairless and surface becoming rounded. The leaves are narrowly egg-shaped or oblong, 24–70 mm (0.94–2.76 in) long, 8–17 mm (0.31–0.67 in) wide with star-shaped hairs on both sides with a petiole 4–10 mm (0.16–0.39 in) long. The leaf margins are scalloped and leaves rounded at the apex. The inflorescence consists of 1-3 pink flowers with five lobed petals on a stalk 2–8 mm (0.079–0.315 in) long that is densely covered with star-shaped hairs. The 5 pink calyx lobes are densely covered on the outer side with star-shaped hairs. The fruit are light green ageing to pale brown, globular shaped, 10–16 mm (0.39–0.63 in) in diameter and thickly covered with straight, stiff hairs 2–4 mm (0.079–0.157 in) long. The dark brown seed is 1.5–2.5 mm (0.059–0.098 in) long. Flowering occurs from August to February.

== Taxonomy and naming ==
Sandy Hollow commersonia was first formally described in 2004 by Stephen Andrew Bell and Lachlan Mackenzie Copeland and given the name Commersonia rosea and the description published in Telopea from specimens collected at Sandy Hollow. In 2011 Barbara Ann Whitlock and Carolyn F. Wilkins changed the name to Androcalva rosea and published the change in Australian Systematic Botany. The specific epithet (rosea) is from the Latin rosaceus meaning "rosy".

== Distribution and habitat ==
The species is only known from four areas all within an 8 kilometre radius of Sandy Hollow district of the upper Hunter Valley. It grows in scrubland and heath vegetation on poor sandy soils.

== Conservation status ==
Androcalva rosea is listed as "endangered" under the Australian Government Environment Protection and Biodiversity Conservation Act 1999 under the name Commersonia rosea and the New South Wales Government Biodiversity Conservation Act 2016. The main threats to the species include land clearance, inappropriate fire regimes, browsing by goats and rabbits and prolonged drought.
