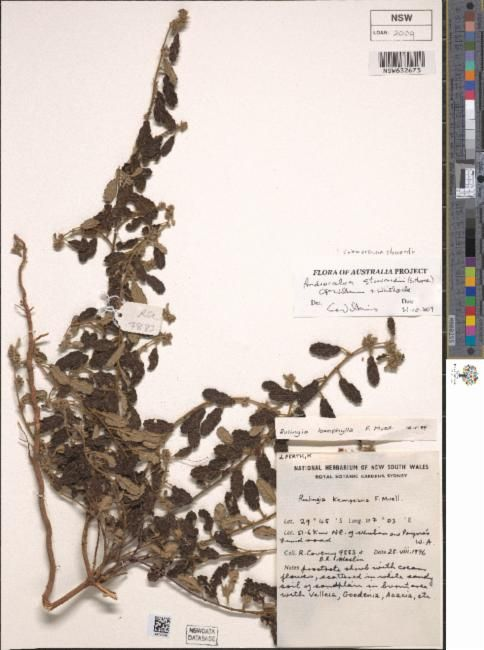
- Isotype in the National Herbarium of New South Wales)

Scientific classification
- Kingdom: Plantae
- Clade: Embryophytes
- Clade: Tracheophytes
- Clade: Spermatophytes
- Clade: Angiosperms
- Clade: Eudicots
- Clade: Rosids
- Order: Malvales
- Family: Malvaceae
- Genus: Androcalva
- Species: A. stowardii

Binomial name
- Androcalva stowardii (S.Moore) C.F.Wilkins & Whitlock

Synonyms
- Commersonia stowardii S.Moore

= Androcalva stowardii =

Species of flowering plant

Androcalva stowardii is a species of flowering plant in the family Malvaceae and is endemic to inland parts of the south-west of Western Australia. It is a prostrate to low-lying shrub with elliptic to egg-shaped leaves, the edges smoothly serrated, and clusters of three to nine or more white to cream-coloured flowers.

== Description ==
Androcalva stowardii is a prostrate to low-lying shrub that typically grows to 5–20 cm (2.0–7.9 in) high and 35–100 cm (14–39 in) wide, its new growth covered with scaly, yellowish hairs. Its leaves are elliptic to egg-shaped, sometimes with the narrower end towards the base, 2–18 mm (0.079–0.709 in) long and 2–16 mm (0.079–0.630 in) wide on a petiole 3–6 mm (0.12–0.24 in) long with narrowly triangular stipules 1–4 mm (0.039–0.157 in) long at the base. The edges of the leaves are smoothly serrated and both surfaces are covered with white, star-shaped hairs, more densely so on the lower surface. The flowers are arranged in groups of three to nine or more, on a peduncle 1–5 mm (0.039–0.197 in) long, each flower on a pedicel 1–6 mm (0.039–0.236 in) long, with narrowly triangular bracts 1–4 mm (0.039–0.157 in) long at the base. The flowers are 6–8 mm (0.24–0.31 in) in diameter with 5 hairy, white to cream-coloured, petal-like sepals with and 5 white petals that are shorter than the sepals. There are three branched staminodes between each pair of stamens, the central one white and the side lobes red. Flowering mainly occurs from August to November and the fruit is a spherical capsule 6–8 mm (0.24–0.31 in) in diameter and covered with bristles and star-shaped hairs.

== Taxonomy ==
This species was first formally described in 1920 by Spencer Le Marchant Moore who gave it the name as Commersonia stowardii in the Journal of the Linnean Society, Botany, from specimens collected by Frederick Stoward near Nungarin. In 2011, Carolyn Wilkins and Barbara Whitlock transferred the species to Androcalva as A. stowardii in Australian Systematic Botany. The specific epithet (stowardii) honours the collector of the type specimens.

== Distribution and habitat ==
This androcalva grows in sandy soil and gravel in the inland parts of the south-west of Western Australia in the Avon Wheatbelt, Coolgardie and Yalgoo bioregions.

== Conservation status ==
Androcalva stowardii is listed as "not threatened" by the Western Australian Government Department of Biodiversity, Conservation and Attractions.
