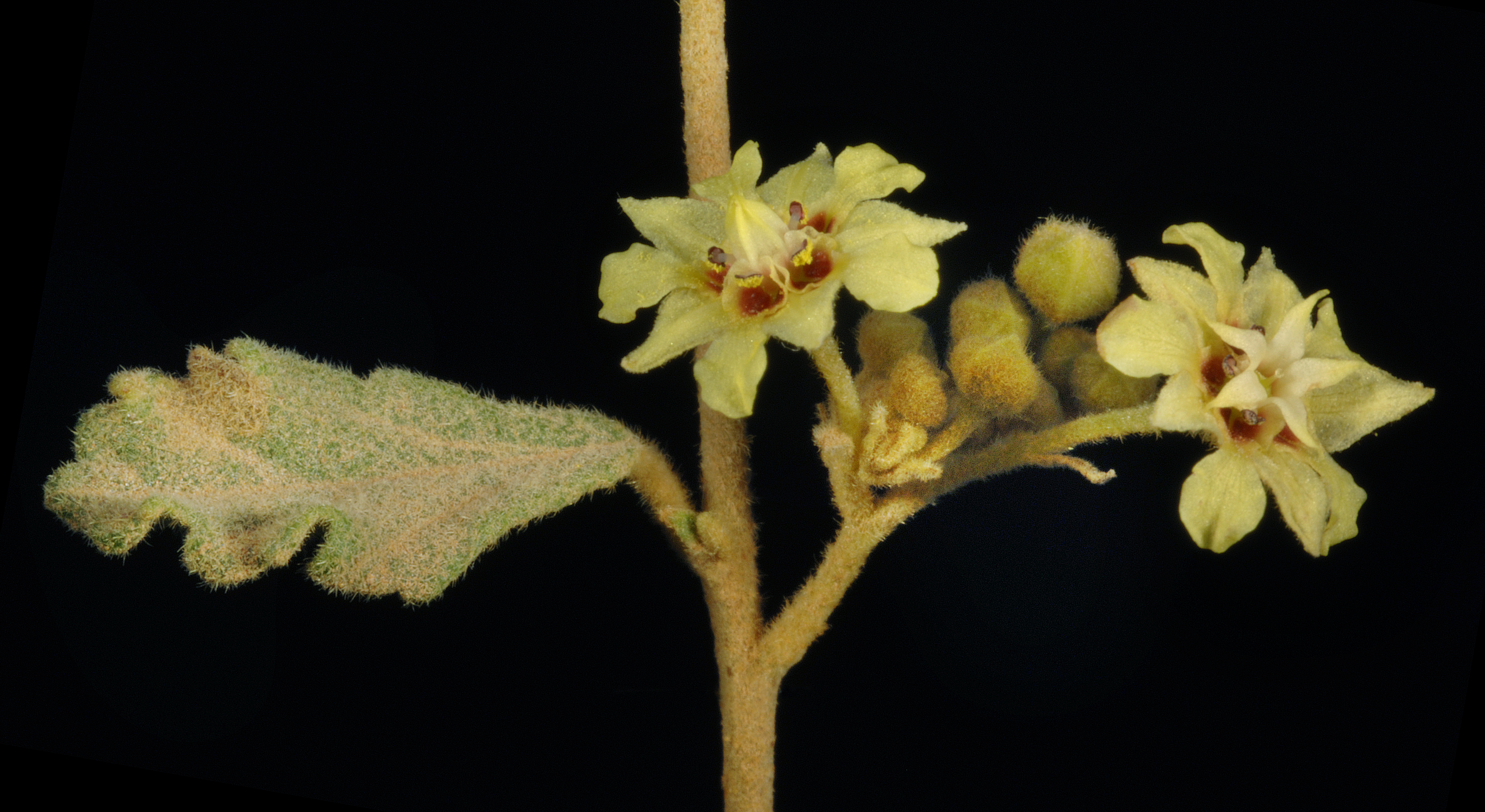

Scientific classification
- Kingdom: Plantae
- Clade: Embryophytes
- Clade: Tracheophytes
- Clade: Spermatophytes
- Clade: Angiosperms
- Clade: Eudicots
- Clade: Rosids
- Order: Malvales
- Family: Malvaceae
- Genus: Androcalva
- Species: A. luteiflora

Binomial name
- Androcalva luteiflora (E.Pritz.) C.F.Wilkins & Whitlock

Synonyms
- Ruelingia luteiflora E.Pritz. orth. var.; Rulingia luteiflora E.Pritz.; Rulingia rotundifolia auct. non Turcz.: Mitchell, A.S. in Jessop, J.P. (ed.) (1981)

= Androcalva luteiflora =

Species of flowering plant

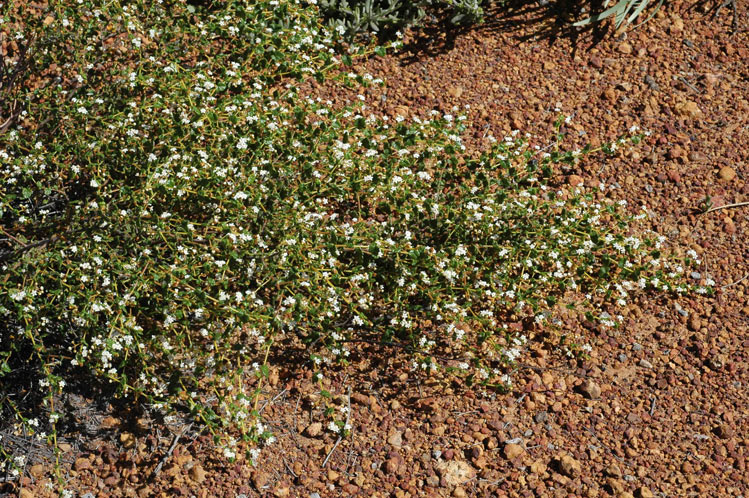
Habit near Binnu

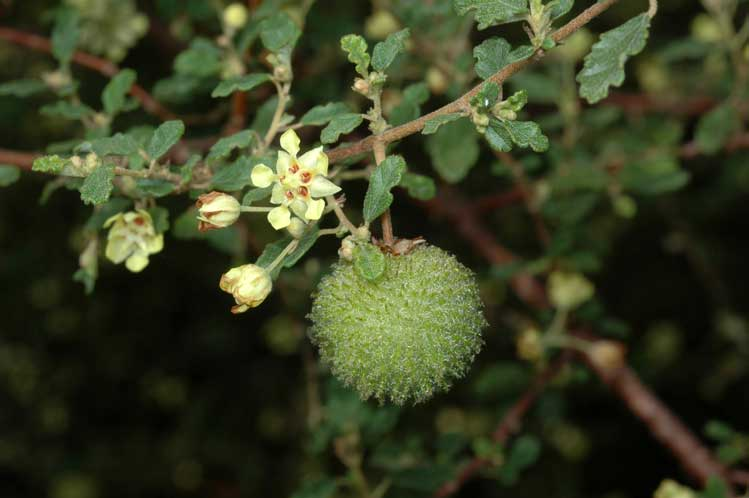
Fruit

Androcalva luteiflora is a species of flowering plant in the family Malvaceae and is endemic to western Australia. It is an erect, sucker-forming shrub with egg-shaped leaves, the edges irregularly toothed, and clusters of 3 to 18 or more yellow flowers.

== Description ==
Androcalva luteifolia is an erect, sucker-forming shrub with its new growth covered with light brown, star-shaped hairs, and that typically grows to 1–4 m (3 ft 3 in – 13 ft 1 in) high and wide. Its leaves are egg-shaped, sometimes with the narrower end towards the base, 2–20 mm (0.079–0.787 in) long and 1–12 mm (0.039–0.472 in) wide on a petiole 3–8 mm (0.12–0.31 in) long with narrowly triangular stipules 1–4 mm (0.039–0.157 in) long at the base. The edges of the leaves are turned under and irregularly toothed, the lower surface covered with matted, white to pale brown hairs. The flowers are arranged in clusters of 3 to 18 or more, on a peduncle 2–10 mm (0.079–0.394 in) long, each flower on a pedicel 1–5 mm (0.039–0.197 in) long, with a narrowly triangular bract 1–5 mm (0.039–0.197 in) long at the base. The flowers are 6–8 mm (0.24–0.31 in) in diameter with 5 pale to bright yellow, petal-like sepals, bright yellow petals 3–9 mm (0.12–0.35 in) long with an orb-shaped ligule, and a usually a single staminode between the stamens. Flowering occurs from July to October and the fruit is a hairy, spherical capsule 7–20 mm (0.28–0.79 in) in diameter.

== Taxonomy ==
This species was first formally described in 1904 by Ernst Georg Pritzel who gave it the name Rulingia luteiflora in Botanische Jahrbücher für Systematik, Pflanzengeschichte und Pflanzengeographie. In 2011, Carolyn Wilkins and Barbara Whitlock assigned it to the new genus Androcalva in Australian Systematic Botany. The specific epithet (luteiflora) means "golden-yellow-flowered".

== Distribution and habitat ==
Androcalva luteiflora grows in sandy soil, sometimes in rocky habitats and is widespread in Western Australia, and also occurs near Mount Winter in central Northern Territory.

== Conservation status ==
Androcalva luteiflora is listed as "not threatened" by the Western Australian Government Department of Biodiversity, Conservation and Attractions, but as "near threatened" under the Northern Territory Government Territory Parks and Wildlife Conservation Act.
