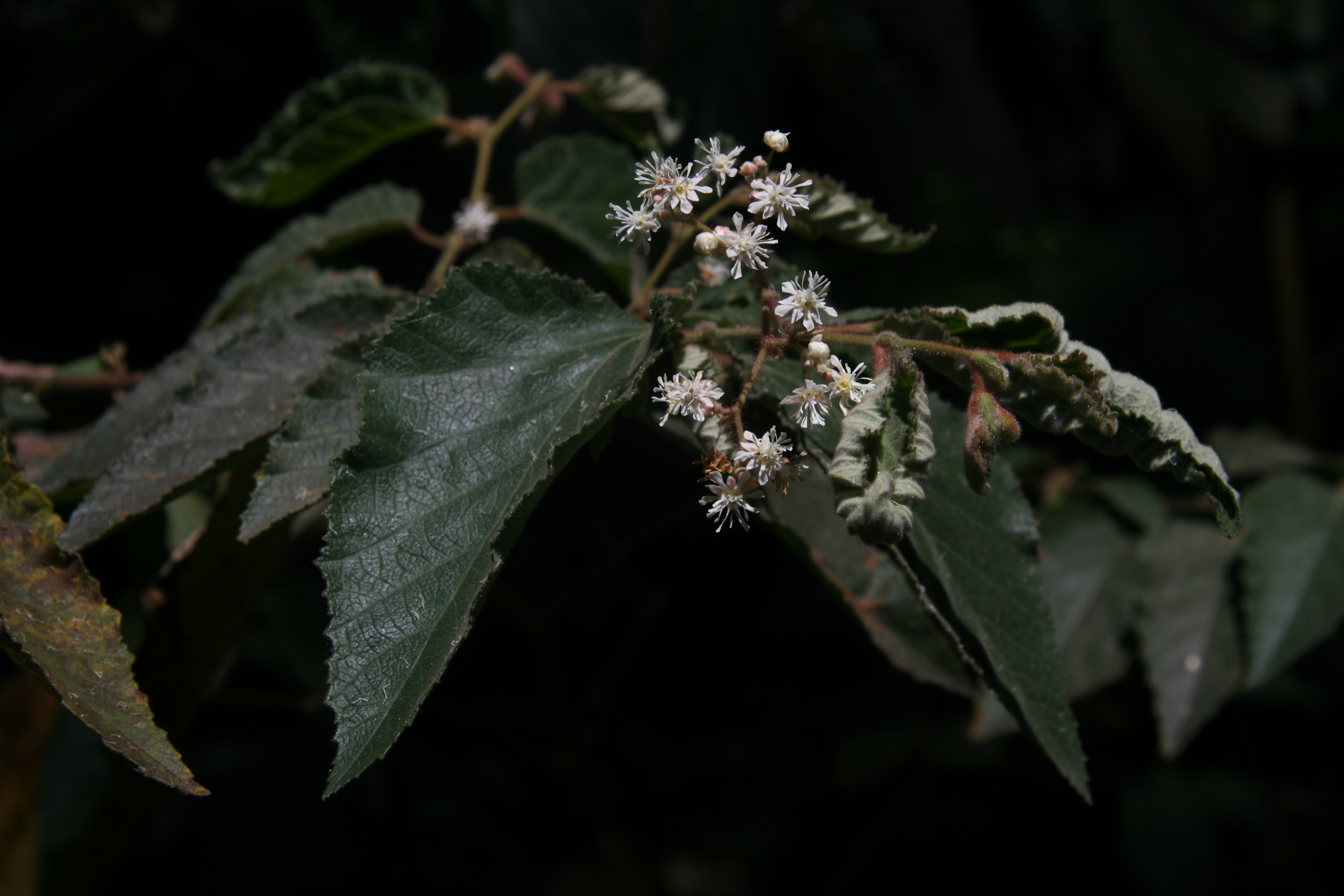
- Androcalva fraseri

Scientific classification
- Kingdom: Plantae
- Clade: Embryophytes
- Clade: Tracheophytes
- Clade: Spermatophytes
- Clade: Angiosperms
- Clade: Eudicots
- Clade: Rosids
- Order: Malvales
- Family: Malvaceae
- Subfamily: Byttnerioideae
- Tribe: Lasiopetaleae
- Genus: Androcalva; C.F.Wilkins & Whitlock

Type species
- Androcalva perlaria C.F.Wilkins

Species
- See text

= Androcalva =

Genus of flowering plants

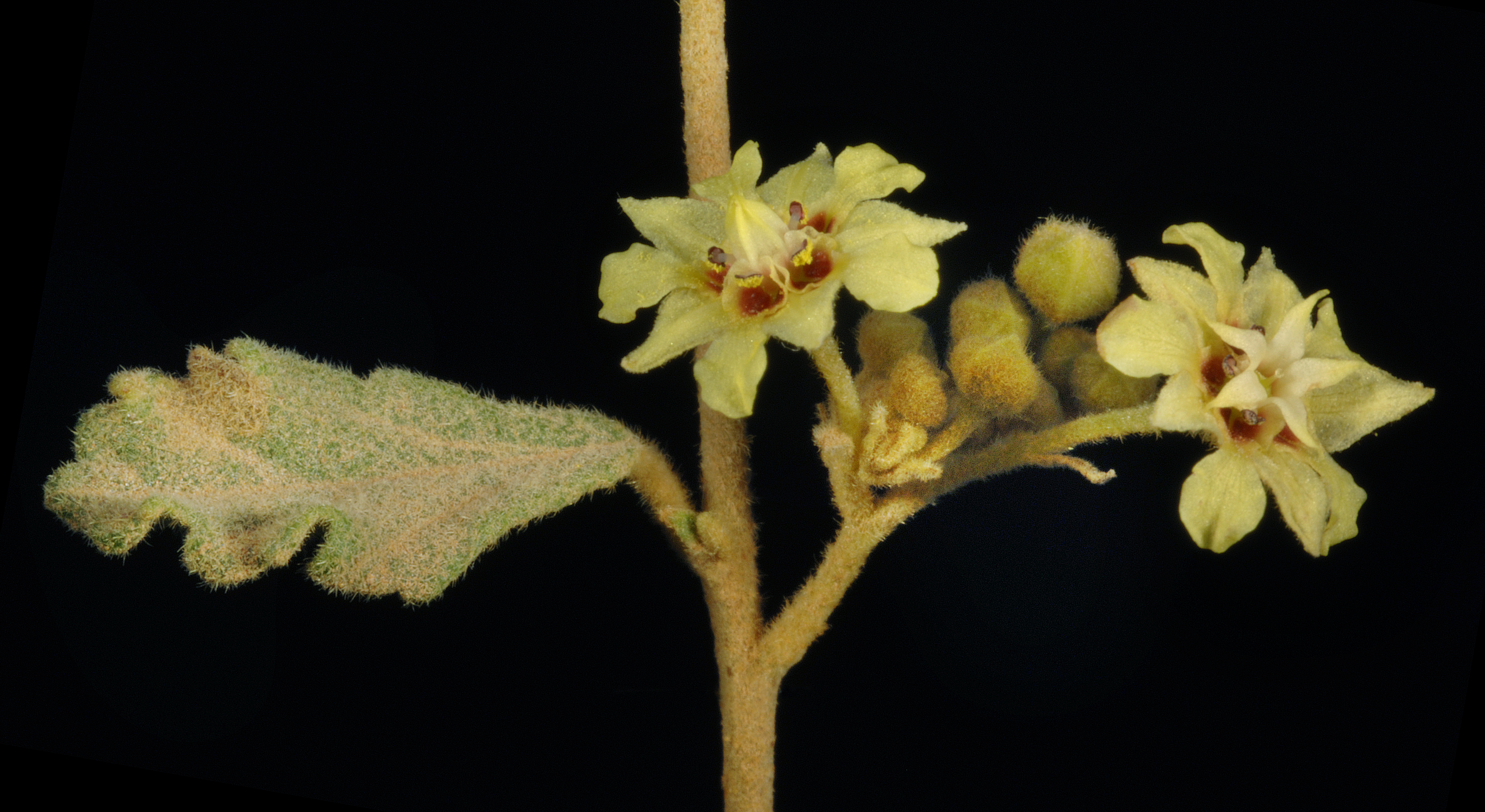
Androcalva luteiflora

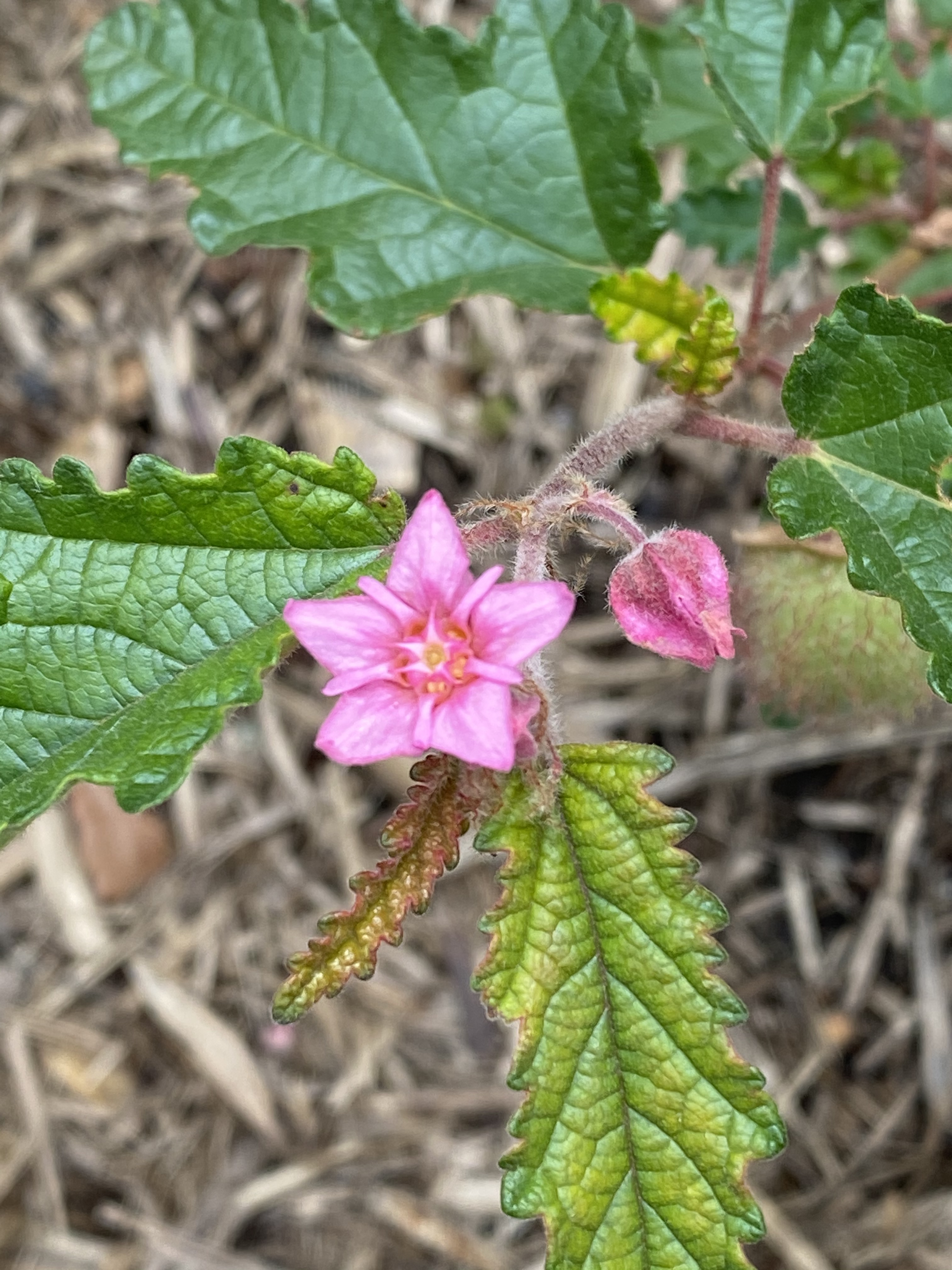
Androcalva rosea

Androcalva is a genus of 33 species of flowering plants in the family Malvaceae and is endemic to continental Australia.

== Description ==
Plants in the genus Androcalva are shrubs or trees and have stems, leaves and flowers covered with star-like hairs. The leaves are simple, often with irregularly-toothed or lobed edges, and with ligules at the base but that are sometimes deciduous. The flowers are bisexual, arranged in cymes opposite leaf axils, with 5 sepals, 5 petals, 5 stamens, and 5 staminodes sometimes with 3 lobes. The fruit is a bristly capsule with five valves, and is covered with star-shaped hairs.

== Taxonomy ==
The genus Androcalva was first formally described in 2011 by Carolyn Wilkins and Barbara Whitlock in Australian Systematic Botany and comprises species formerly included in Commersonia (22) and Rulingia (4) as well as 7 new species. The name Androcalva means "bald male", referring to the glabrous staminodes.

== Distribution ==
All 33 species of Androcalva are endemic to Australia, and species occur in all continental states and territories.

== Species list ==
The following is a list of species accepted by the Australian Plant Census as of March 2023:

- Androcalva adenothalia C.F.Wilkins (W.A.)
- Androcalva aphrix C.F.Wilkins (W.A.)
- Androcalva argentea (Guymer) C.F.Wilkins & Whitlock (Qld.)
- Androcalva beeronensis (Guymer) C.F.Wilkins & Whitlock (Qld.)
- Androcalva bivillosa C.F.Wilkins (W.A.)
- Androcalva crispa (Turcz.) C.F.Wilkins & Whitlock - crisped leaf commersonia (W.A.)
- Androcalva cuneata (Turcz.) C.F.Wilkins & Whitlock (W.A.)
- Androcalva fragifolia C.F.Wilkins (W.A.)
- Androcalva fraseri (J.Gay) C.F.Wilkins & Whitlock - blackfellow's hemp, brush kurrajong (N.S.W., Qld.)
- Androcalva gaudichaudii (J.Gay) C.F.Wilkins & Whitlock (W.A.)
- Androcalva incilis C.F.Wilkins (W.A.)
- Androcalva inglewoodensis (Guymer) C.F.Wilkins & Whitlock (Qld.)
- Androcalva johnsonii (Guymer) C.F.Wilkins & Whitlock (Qld.)
- Androcalva lachna C.F.Wilkins (W.A.)
- Androcalva leichhardtii (Benth.) C.F.Wilkins & Whitlock (Qld.)
- Androcalva leiperi (Guymer) C.F.Wilkins & Whitlock (Qld.)
- Androcalva loxophylla (F.Muell.) C.F.Wilkins & Whitlock (W.A., N.T., S.A., Qld.)
- Androcalva luteiflora (E.Pritz.) C.F.Wilkins & Whitlock (W.A., N.T.)
- Androcalva melanopetala (F.Muell.) C.F.Wilkins & Whitlock (W.A.)
- Androcalva microphylla (Benth.) C.F.Wilkins & Whitlock (W.A.)
- Androcalva multiloba (C.F.Wilkins & Whitlock) C.F.Wilkins & Whitlock (S.A.)
- Androcalva pearnii (Guymer) C.F.Wilkins & Whitlock (Qld.)
- Androcalva pedleyi (Guymer) C.F.Wilkins & Whitlock (Qld.)
- Androcalva perkinsiana (Guymer) C.F.Wilkins & Whitlock (Qld.)
- Androcalva perlaria C.F.Wilkins (W.A.)
- Androcalva procumbens (Maiden & Betche) C.F.Wilkins & Whitlock (N.S.W.)
- Androcalva pulchella (Turcz.) C.F.Wilkins & Whitlock (W.A.)
- Androcalva reticulata (Guymer) C.F.Wilkins & Whitlock (Qld.)
- Androcalva rosea (S.A.J.Bell & L.M.Copel.) C.F.Wilkins & Whitlock (N.S.W.)
- Androcalva rossii (Guymer) C.F.Wilkins & Whitlock - blackfellow's hemp (N.S.W., Vic.)
- Androcalva stowardii (S.Moore) C.F.Wilkins & Whitlock (W.A.)
- Androcalva tatei (F.Muell. ex Tate) C.F.Wilkins & Whitlock - trailing commersonia (S.A., Vic.)
- Androcalva viscidula (Guymer) C.F.Wilkins & Whitlock (Qld., N.S.W.)
