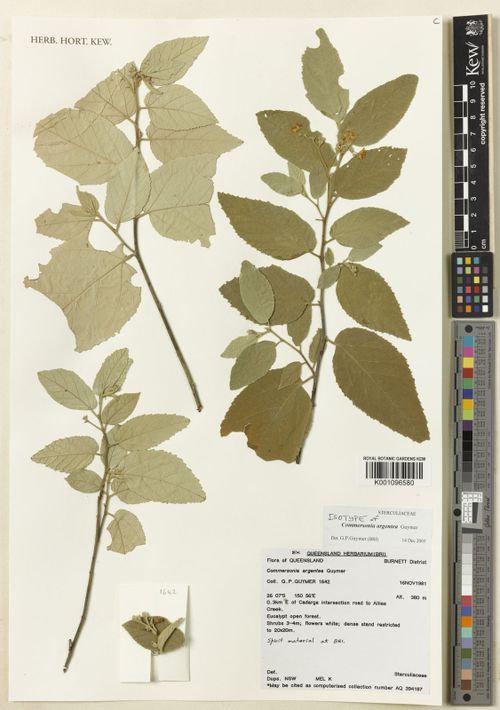
- Isotype in the Royal Botanic Gardens, Kew

Scientific classification
- Kingdom: Plantae
- Clade: Embryophytes
- Clade: Tracheophytes
- Clade: Spermatophytes
- Clade: Angiosperms
- Clade: Eudicots
- Clade: Rosids
- Order: Malvales
- Family: Malvaceae
- Genus: Androcalva
- Species: A. argentea

Binomial name
- Androcalva argentea (Guymer) C.F.Wilkins & Whitlock

Synonyms
- Commersonia argentea Guymer; Commersonia sp. 'Cadarga' (G.P.Guymer 1642); Commersonia sp. (Cadarga G.P.Guymer 1642); Commersonia sp. 1 (Cadarga); Commersonia sp. 1 (Cardargia; G.P.Guymer 1642); Commersonia sp. 2; Commersonia sp. Cadarga (G.P.Guymer 1642)

= Androcalva argentea =

Species of shrub

Androcalva argentea is a species of flowering plant in the family Malvaceae and is endemic to Queensland. It is a tall shrub that forms suckers from rhizomes and has silvery branchlets and leaves, the leaves egg-shaped with wavy edges and serrated, and dense clusters of 10 to 30 white to cream-coloured flowers.

== Description ==
Androcalva argentea is a shrub that typically grows to 1.5–4 m (4 ft 11 in – 13 ft 1 in) high, 1–3 m (3 ft 3 in – 9 ft 10 in) wide, forms suckers from rhizomes, and has its new growth densely covered with silvery, velvety hairs. The leaves are egg-shaped, 35–130 mm (1.4–5.1 in) long and 20–75 mm (0.79–2.95 in) wide on a petiole 4–8 mm (0.16–0.31 in) long with triangular stipules 2–6 mm (0.079–0.236 in) long at the base, but that fall off as the leaf matures. There are irregular, rounded serrations on the edges of the leaves and both surfaces of the leaves are covered with velvety, star-shaped hairs. The flowers are arranged in dense clusters of 10 to 30 on a peduncle 10–20 mm (0.39–0.79 in) long, each flower on a pedicel 4–11 mm (0.16–0.43 in) long, with bracts 2–4 mm (0.079–0.157 in) long at the base. The flowers are white to cream-coloured and up to 10 mm (0.39 in) in diameter with 5 petal-like sepals with velvety hairs on the outside. The petals are 4–6 mm (0.16–0.24 in) long with 3 lobes slightly longer than the sepal lobes, and there are 3 staminodes, the central one spatula-shaped and the other two linear and longer than the sepal lobes. Flowering has been recorded from November to January, and in March.

== Taxonomy ==
This species was first formally described in 2005 by Gordon Guymer who gave it the name Commersonia argentea in the journal Austrobaileya from specimens he collected near Cadarga in 1981. In 2011, Carolyn Wilkins and Barbara Whitlock transferred the species to Androcalva as A. argentea in Australian Systematic Botany. The specific epithet (argentea) means "silver", referring to the colour of the leaves of this species.

== Distribution and habitat ==
Androcalva argentea grows in forest on ridges and along creeks from the Carnarvon Range to near Chinchilla in central and south-eastern Queensland.
