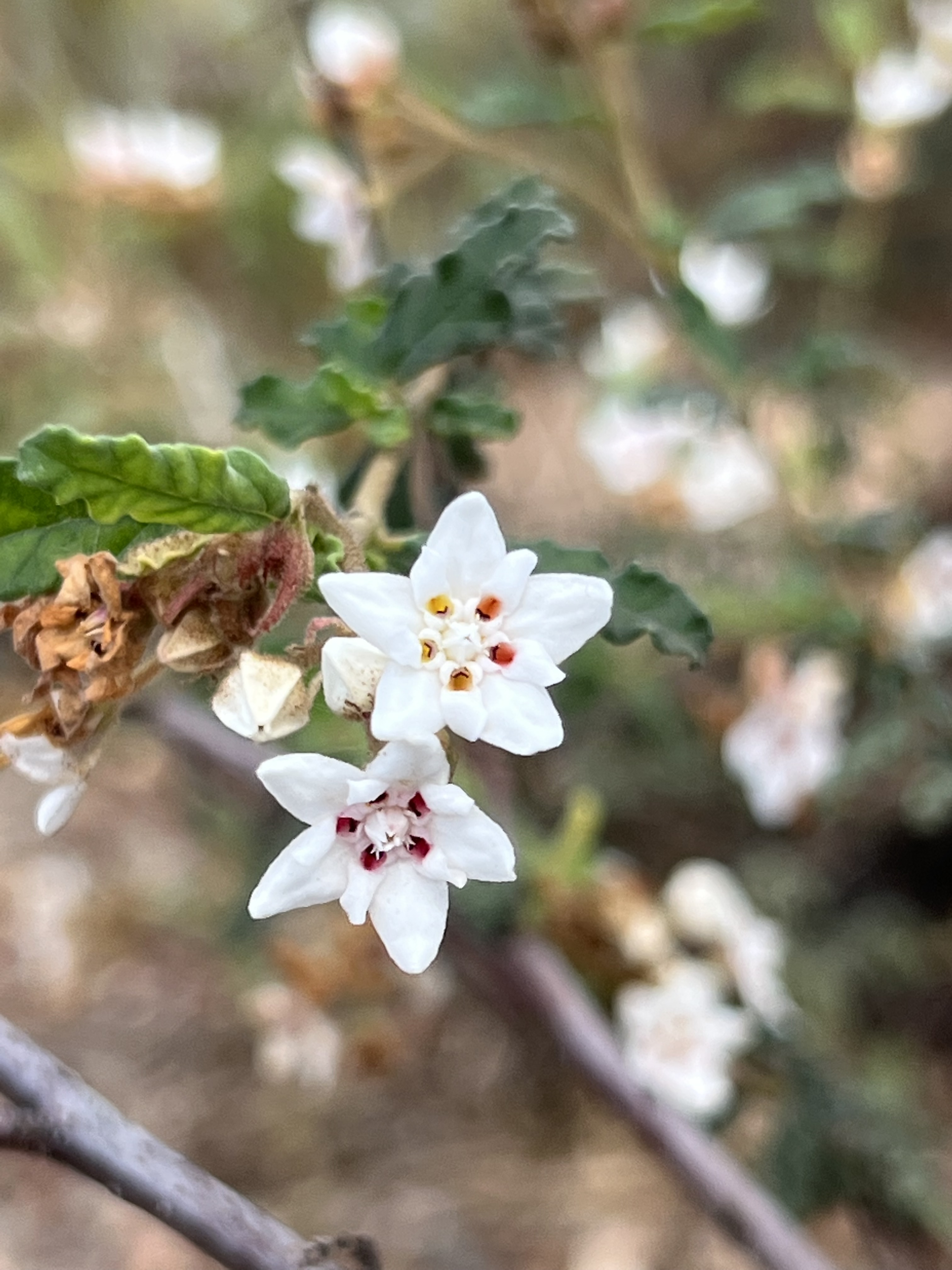

Scientific classification
- Kingdom: Plantae
- Clade: Embryophytes
- Clade: Tracheophytes
- Clade: Spermatophytes
- Clade: Angiosperms
- Clade: Eudicots
- Clade: Rosids
- Order: Malvales
- Family: Malvaceae
- Genus: Androcalva
- Species: A. multiloba

Binomial name
- Androcalva multiloba (C.F.Wilkins & Whitlock) C.F.Wilkins & Whitlock

Synonyms
- Commersonia multiloba C.F.Wilkins & Whitlock; Commersonia tatei auct. non F.Muell. ex Tate: Jessop, J.P. & Toelken, H.R.

= Androcalva multiloba =

Species of shrub

Androcalva multiloba is a species of flowering plant in the family Malvaceae and is endemic to the Eyre Peninsula of South Australia. It is a dwarf shrub with densely hairy, irregularly serrated, egg-shaped leaves, and up to 5 white and red flowers arranged opposite leaf axils or on the ends of branches.

== Description ==
Androcalva multiloba is a dwarf shrub that typically grows to 15–50 cm (5.9–19.7 in) high and 30–100 cm (12–39 in) wide, with a single stem at the base and spreading branches. The leaves are egg-shaped, 1.5–20 mm (0.059–0.787 in) long and 1.2–7.5 mm (0.047–0.295 in) wide on a petiole 0.3–5.5 mm (0.012–0.217 in) long with narrowly lance-shaped stipules 1.0–5.3 mm (0.039–0.209 in) long at the base but that fall off as the leaf matures. The leaves are arranged in small groups along the stems, the edges of the leaves with irregular serrations lobes on the edges. Both surfaces of the leaves are densely covered with star-shaped hairs. The flowers are arranged opposite the leaves or on the ends of branches in clusters of up to 5 on a peduncle 2–7 mm (0.079–0.276 in) long, each flower 9–15 mm (0.35–0.59 in) in diameter, on a pedicel 2–5 mm (0.079–0.197 in) long, with bracts 1.8–4 mm (0.071–0.157 in) long at the base. The flowers have 5 white, petal-like sepals with a green or pink base, and 5 petals with a spatula-shaped ligule that is shorter than the sepals. There are 3 staminodes between each pair of stamens. Flowering occurs from August to October, and the fruit is a softly-hairy capsule 6–12 mm (0.24–0.47 in) in diameter.

== Taxonomy ==
This species was first formally described in 2005 by Carolyn Wilkins and Barbara Whitlock who gave it the name Commersonia multiloba in the journal Muelleria, from specimens they collected near Cowell in 2004. In 2011, Wilkins and Whitlock transferred the species to Androcalva as A. multiloba in Australian Systematic Botany. The specific epithet (multiloba) refers to the many serrated lobes on the edges of the leaves.

== Distribution and habitat ==
Androcalva multiloba grows with species of Melaleuca and Acacia in two populations on the northern part of the Eyre Peninsula in south-eastern South Australia.
