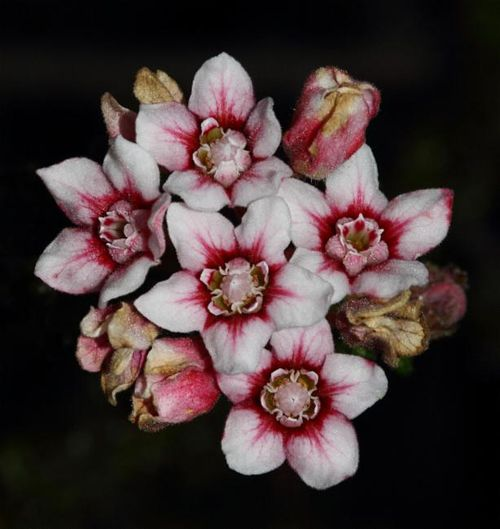

Scientific classification
- Kingdom: Plantae
- Clade: Embryophytes
- Clade: Tracheophytes
- Clade: Spermatophytes
- Clade: Angiosperms
- Clade: Eudicots
- Clade: Rosids
- Order: Malvales
- Family: Malvaceae
- Genus: Androcalva
- Species: A. microphylla

Binomial name
- Androcalva microphylla (Benth.) C.F.Wilkins & Whitlock

Synonyms
- Commerconia microphylla F.Muell. orth. var.; Commersonia microphylla Benth.; Restiaria microphylla (Benth.) Kuntze

= Androcalva microphylla =

Species of shrub

Androcalva microphylla is a species of flowering plant in the family Malvaceae and is endemic to the south-west of Western Australia. It is an open, straggling shrub with egg-shaped to oblong leaves with a heart-shaped base, and clusters of 5 to 7 white and dark red flowers.

== Description ==
Androcalva microphylla is an open, straggling, low-growing shrub that typically grows to 0.8–2 m (2 ft 7 in – 6 ft 7 in) high and 1–3 m (3 ft 3 in – 9 ft 10 in) wide, its new growth covered with yellowish star-shaped hairs. The leaves are egg-shaped to oblong with a heart-shaped base, 1–8 mm (0.039–0.315 in) long and 1–7 mm (0.039–0.276 in) wide on a petiole 1–2 mm (0.039–0.079 in) long with narrow stipules 1–3 mm (0.039–0.118 in) long at the base. The edges of the leaves have irregular, rounded lobes, the upper surface with impressed veins, the lower surface covered with white, star-shaped hairs. The flowers are arranged in clusters of 5 to 7 on a peduncle 5–15 mm (0.20–0.59 in) long, each flower 5–10 mm (0.20–0.39 in) in diameter, on a pedicel 2–7 mm (0.079–0.276 in) long, with shaggy-hairy bracts at the base. The flowers have 5 white, petal-like sepals with a dark red base, and 5 petals with a round ligule. There are usually 3 tiny staminodes between each pair of stamens. Flowering occurs from August to November, and the fruit is a more or less spherical capsule 6–10 mm (0.24–0.39 in) in diameter.

== Taxonomy ==
This species was first formally described in 1863 by George Bentham who gave it the name Commersonia microphylla in Flora Australiensis, from specimens collected by James Drummond near the Murchison River. In 2011, Carolyn Wilkins and Barbara Whitlock transferred the species to Androcalva as A. microphylla in Australian Systematic Botany. The specific epithet (microphylla) means "small leaves".

== Distribution and habitat ==
Androcalva microphylla mostly grows in open shrubland between the Murchison River and Eurardy Station in the Geraldton Sandplains and Yalgoo bioregions of south-western Western Australia.

== Conservation status ==
Androcalva microphylla is listed as "Priority Two" by the Western Australian Government Department of Biodiversity, Conservation and Attractions, meaning that it is poorly known and from only one or a few locations.
