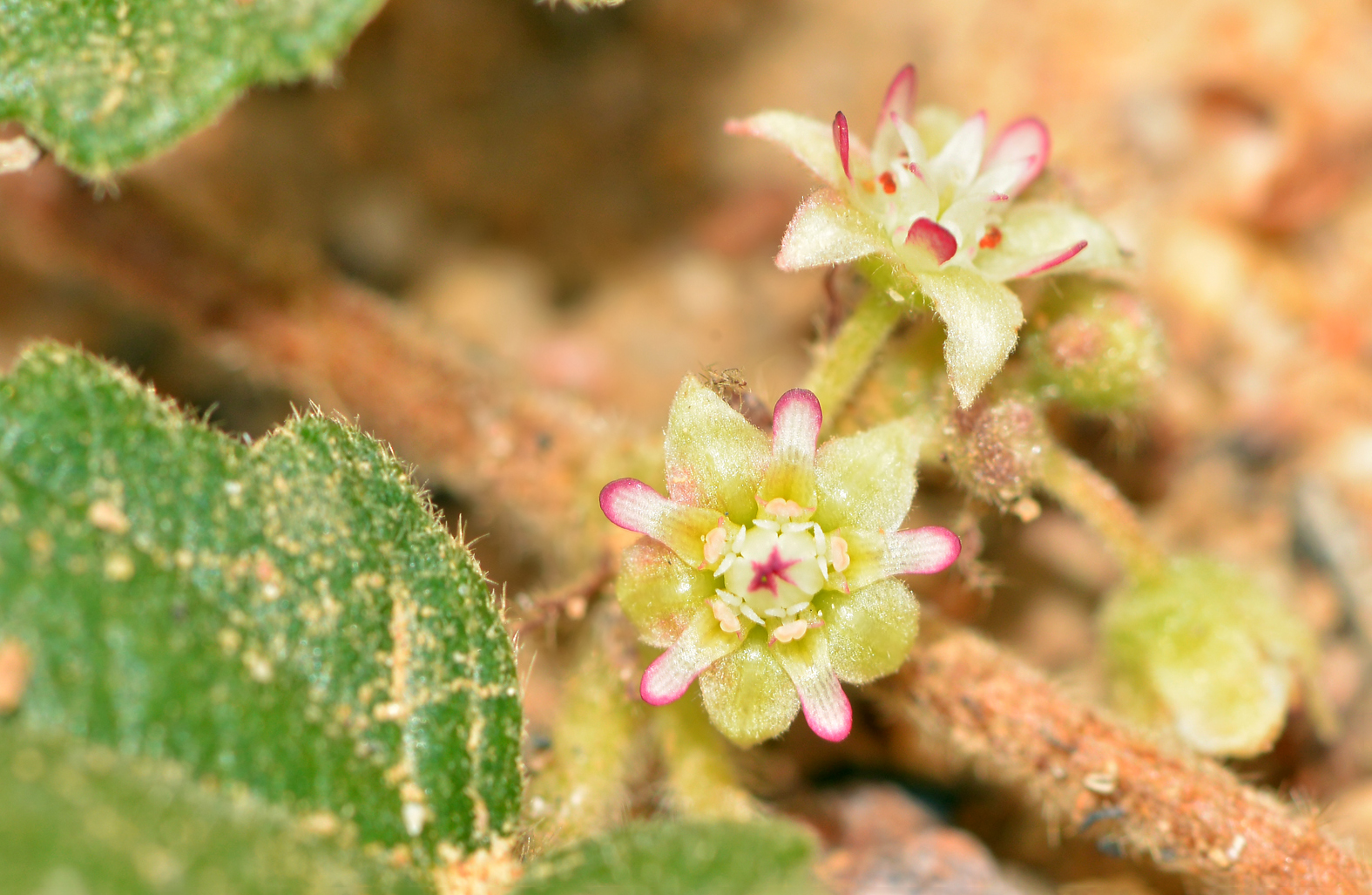

Scientific classification
- Kingdom: Plantae
- Clade: Embryophytes
- Clade: Tracheophytes
- Clade: Spermatophytes
- Clade: Angiosperms
- Clade: Eudicots
- Clade: Rosids
- Order: Malvales
- Family: Malvaceae
- Genus: Androcalva
- Species: A. aphrix

Binomial name
- Androcalva aphrix C.F.Wilkins

Synonyms
- Rulingia cuneata auct. non Turcz.

= Androcalva aphrix =

Species of shrub

Androcalva aphrix is a species of flowering plant in the family Malvaceae and is endemic to the south-west of Western Australia. It is a dwarf, prostrate, hairy shrub with clusters of 14 or more pink or white flowers.

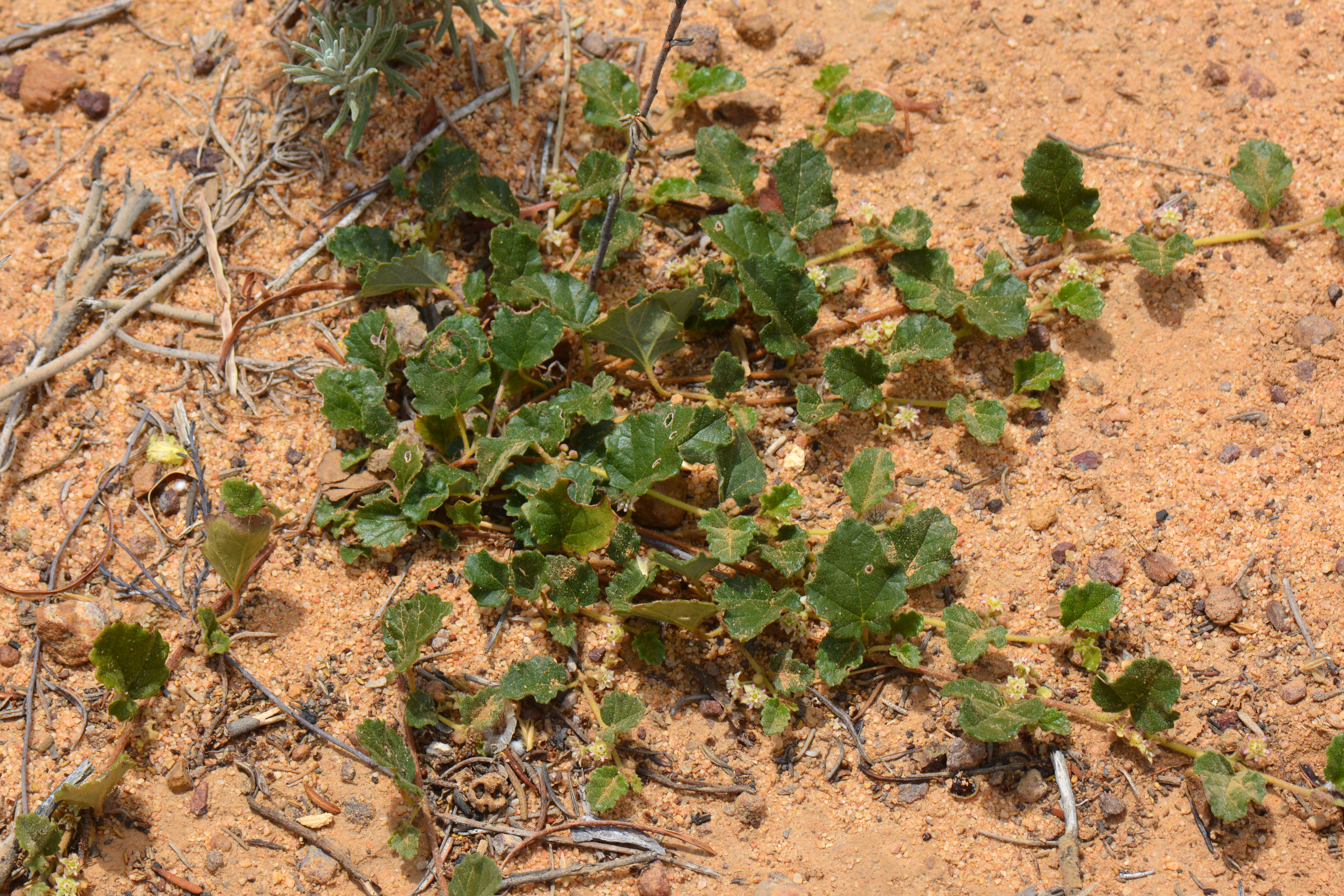
Habit in Boorabbin National Park

== Description ==
Androcalva aphrix is a dwarf, prostrate shrub that typically grows to 2–5 cm (0.79–1.97 in) high, 30–70 cm (12–28 in) wide, forms suckers, and is densely covered with white, star-shaped hairs. The adult leaves are 4–22 mm (0.16–0.87 in) long and 3–12 mm (0.12–0.47 in) wide on a petiole 2–9 mm (0.079–0.354 in) long with egg-shaped and lobed stipules 2–4 mm (0.079–0.157 in) long at the base. Juvenile leaves are often almost twice the size of the adult leaves and are sometimes lobed. Both surfaces of the leaves are densely covered with star-shaped hairs, the upper surface becoming glabrous with age. The flowers are arranged in tight heads of 14 or more on a peduncle up to 2.5 mm (0.098 in) long, each flower on a pedicel 1–4 mm (0.039–0.157 in) long, with egg-shaped bracts up to 4 mm (0.16 in) long at the base. The flowers are pink or white and 6–8 mm (0.24–0.31 in) in diameter with 5 petal-like sepals and 5 white petals, the ligules about the same length as the sepals. There are 3 staminodes between each pair of stamens, the central one egg-shaped and the other two linear. Flowering occurs from August to January.

== Taxonomy ==
Androcalva aphrix was first formally described in 2011 by Carolyn Wilkins in Australian Systematic Botany from specimens collected from Yellowdine Nature Reserve in 2003. The specific epithet (aphrix) means "without a ripple", referring to the flat leaf margins.

== Distribution and habitat ==
This species grows in open shrubland and on sandplains between Kellerberrin, Kalgoorlie and Gibsons Soak north of Esperance, in the Avon Wheatbelt, Coolgardie, Esperance Plains and Mallee bioregions of south-western Western Australia.

== Conservation status ==
Androcalva aphrix is listed as "not threatened" by the Western Australian Government Department of Biodiversity, Conservation and Attractions.
