= Androcalva perlaria =

Conservation status
- Endangered (EPBC Act)

Scientific classification
- Kingdom: Plantae
- Clade: Embryophytes
- Clade: Tracheophytes
- Clade: Spermatophytes
- Clade: Angiosperms
- Clade: Eudicots
- Clade: Rosids
- Order: Malvales
- Family: Malvaceae
- Genus: Androcalva
- Species: A. perlaria

Binomial name
- Androcalva perlaria C.F.Wilkins

Synonyms
- Commersonia sp. Mount Groper (R.Cranfield & D.Kabay 9157) WA Herbarium; Commersonia crispa auct. non Turcz.: Blackall, W.E. & Grieve, B.J. (1974); Commersonia crispa auct. non Turcz.: Grieve, B.J. (1998)

Species of shrub

Androcalva perlaria, commonly known as pearl-like androcalva, is a species of flowering plant in the family Malvaceae and is endemic to a restricted area of southern Western Australia. It is a rounded shrub with egg-shaped leaves, the narrower end towards the base, and heads of three to nine white and pinkish flowers.

== Description ==
Androcalva perlaria is a rounded shrub that typically grows to 40 cm (16 in) high and 100 cm (39 in) wide, and has hairy new growth. Its leaves are egg-shaped with the narrower end towards the base, 1–13 mm (0.039–0.512 in) long and 8–9 mm (0.31–0.35 in) wide on a petiole 2–3 mm (0.079–0.118 in) long with lobed, narrowly triangular stipules 2–3 mm (0.079–0.118 in) long. The edges of the leaves are rolled under and irregularly lobed, both surfaces densely covered with fine, star-shaped hairs. The flowers are arranged in heads of three to nine on a peduncle up to 4 mm (0.16 in) long, each flower on a pedicel 1–4 mm (0.039–0.157 in) long, with bracts 1–4 mm (0.039–0.157 in) long at the base. The flowers are 5–7 mm (0.20–0.28 in) wide with 5 white, hairy, petal-like sepals with a pink base, and 5 white petals, the ligule slightly longer than the sepal lobes. There are up to three staminodes between each pair of stamens. Flowering occurs from September to December.

== Taxonomy ==
Androcalva perlaria was first formally described in 2011 by Carolyn Wilkins in Australian Systematic Botany from specimens collected near Wellstead in 2006. The specific epithet (perlaria) means "pearly", referring to the luminescent appearance of the foliage.

== Distribution and habitat ==
This species grows in dense sedgeland in a seasonally wet habitat near Wellstead, and is only known from bout 270 individual plants in fragmented populations in the Esperance Plains bioregion in the south of Western Australia.

== Conservation status ==
Androcalva perlaria is listed as "endangered" under the Australian Government Environment Protection and Biodiversity Conservation Act 1999 and as "Threatened" by the Western Australian Government Department of Biodiversity, Conservation and Attractions, meaning that it is in danger of extinction.
