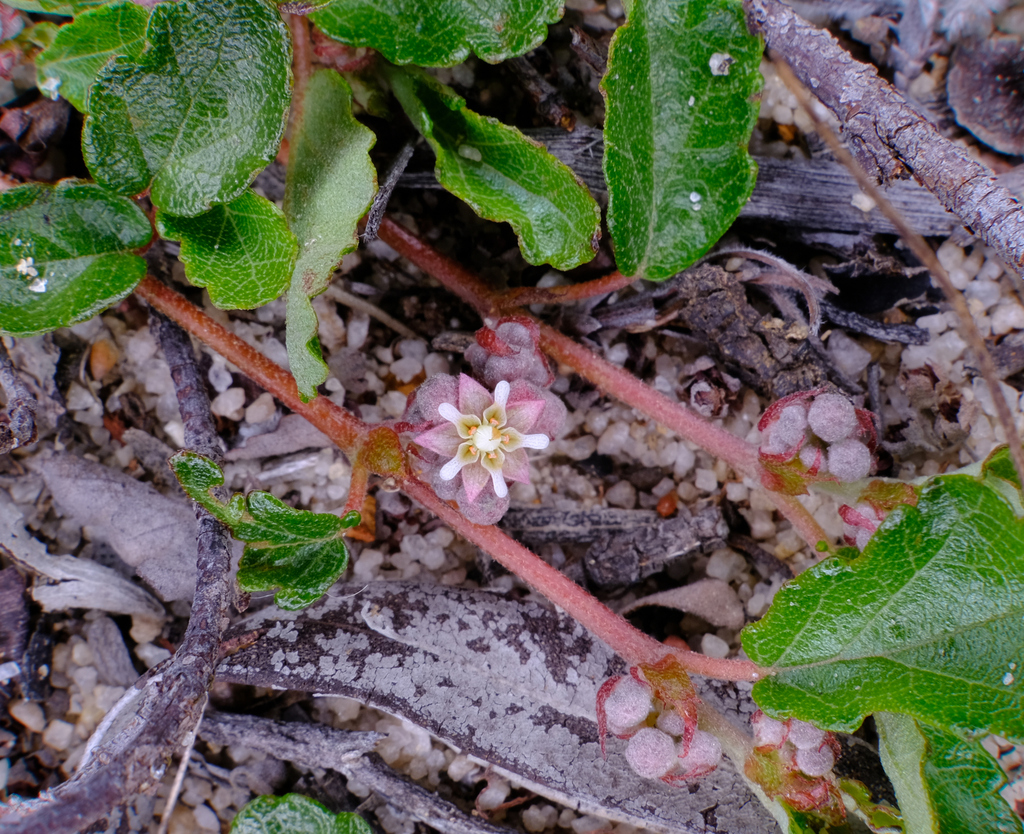
- In Tarin Rock Nature Reserve

Scientific classification
- Kingdom: Plantae
- Clade: Embryophytes
- Clade: Tracheophytes
- Clade: Spermatophytes
- Clade: Angiosperms
- Clade: Eudicots
- Clade: Rosids
- Order: Malvales
- Family: Malvaceae
- Genus: Androcalva
- Species: A. incilis

Binomial name
- Androcalva incilis C.F.Wilkins

Synonyms
- Rulingia incilis C.F.Wilkins MS

= Androcalva incilis =

Species of shrub

Androcalva incilis is a species of flowering plant in the family Malvaceae and is endemic to the south-west of Western Australia. It is a prostrate shrub with dark green, narrowly wedge-shaped to narrowly oblong leaves, and crowded heads of 8 to 12 deep pink flowers.

== Description ==
Androcalva incilis is a prostrate shrub that typically grows to 5–40 cm (2.0–15.7 in) high and 40–60 cm (16–24 in) wide, and forms suckers. Its new growth is covered with white, star-shaped hairs. The leaves are narrowly wedge-shaped to narrowly oblong, 2–22 mm (0.079–0.866 in) long and 1–15 mm (0.039–0.591 in) wide on a petiole 2–6 mm (0.079–0.236 in) long with sometimes divided stipules 2–6 mm (0.079–0.236 in) long at the base. The leaves are dark green with irregular serrations on the edges, both surfaces covered with white, star-shaped hairs, densely so on the lower surface. The flowers are arranged in crowded heads of 8 to 12 on a peduncle 1–3 mm (0.039–0.118 in) long, each flower on a pedicel 1–3 mm (0.039–0.118 in) long, with narrowly egg-shaped bracts 1–4 mm (0.039–0.157 in) long at the base. The flowers are 5–7 mm (0.20–0.28 in) wide with 5 deep pink petal-like sepals and 5 petals, the ligule almost as long as the sepals with wings that partly envelop the stamens. There is usually a single staminode between each pair of stamens. Flowering occurs from July to October.

== Taxonomy ==
Androcalva incilis was first formally described in 2011 by Carolyn Wilkins in Australian Systematic Botany from specimens collected from near Tarin Rock in 2005. The specific epithet (incilis) means "cut-into", referring to the edges of the leaves.

== Distribution and habitat ==
This species mainly grows in heath and woodland between Tarin Rock, Dragon Rocks and Kukerin in the Avon Wheatbelt and Mallee bioregions of south-western Western Australia.

== Conservation status ==
Androcalva incilis is listed as "not threatened" by the Government of Western Australia Department of Biodiversity, Conservation and Attractions.
