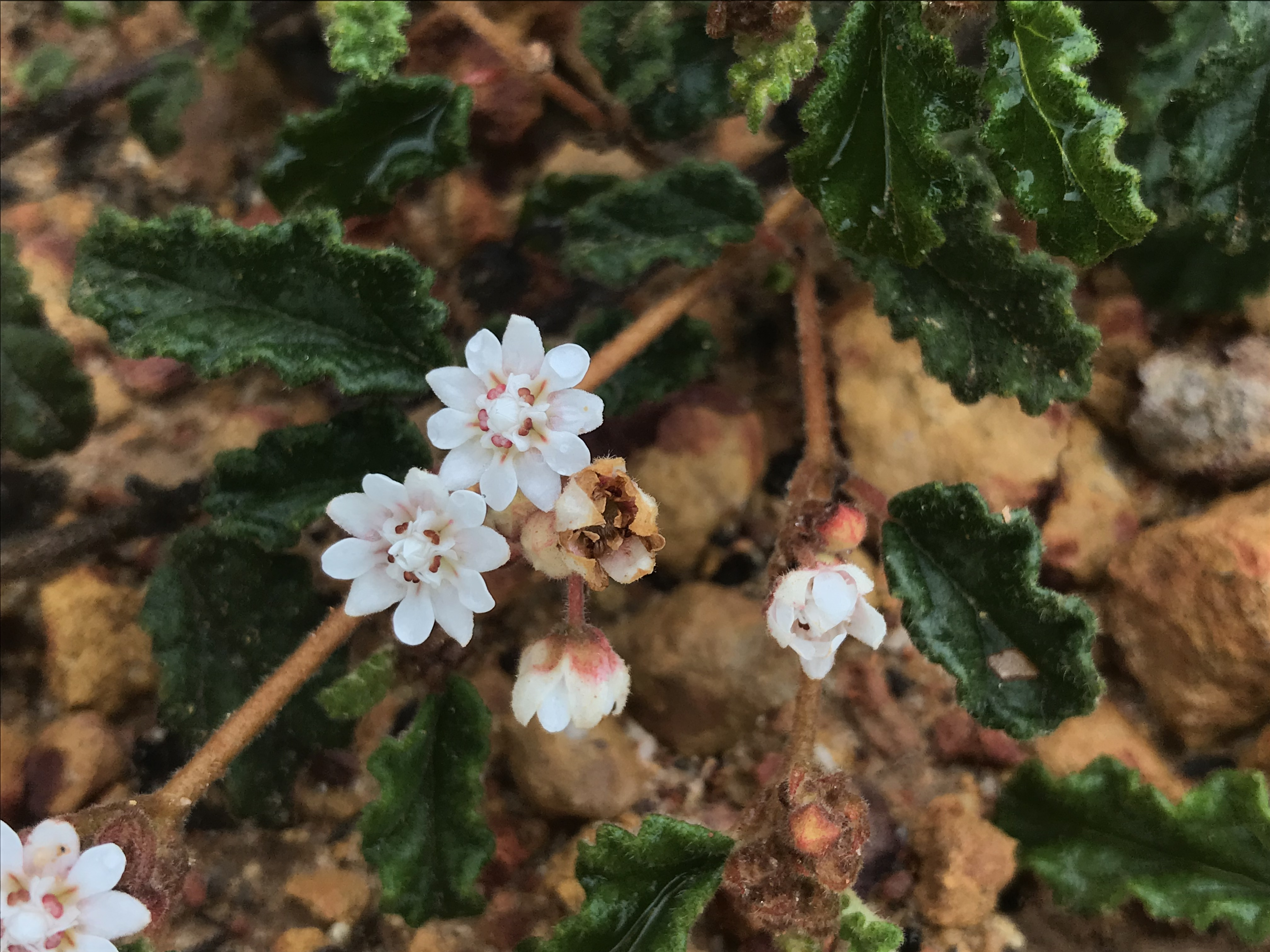

Conservation status
- Declared rare (DEC)

Scientific classification
- Kingdom: Plantae
- Clade: Embryophytes
- Clade: Tracheophytes
- Clade: Spermatophytes
- Clade: Angiosperms
- Clade: Eudicots
- Clade: Rosids
- Order: Malvales
- Family: Malvaceae
- Genus: Androcalva
- Species: A. bivillosa

Binomial name
- Androcalva bivillosa C.F.Wilkins

Synonyms
- Commersonia bivillosa C.F.Wilkins MS; Rulingia crispa auct. non (Turcz.) Turcz.

= Androcalva bivillosa =

Species of shrub

Androcalva bivillosa is a species of flowering plant in the family Malvaceae and is endemic to the south-west of Western Australia. It is a prostrate, spreading shrub with clusters of 3 to 9 white to pink flowers.

== Description ==
Androcalva bivillosa is a prostrate shrub that typically grows up to 40 cm (16 in) high, 1–2 m (3 ft 3 in – 6 ft 7 in) wide, its stems densely covered with both star-shaped and glandular hairs. The leaves are egg-shaped, elliptic or oblong, 6–22 mm (0.24–0.87 in) long and 3–16 mm (0.12–0.63 in) wide on a petiole 2–6 mm (0.079–0.236 in) long with stipules 2–6 mm (0.079–0.236 in) long at the base. The tip of the leaves is rounded, the edges are irregularly serrated and wavy, the upper surface is dark green and glossy, the lower surface densely covered with white, star-shaped hairs. The flowers are arranged in groups of 3 to 9 on a peduncle 1–4 mm (0.039–0.157 in) long, each flower on a pedicel 4–7 mm (0.16–0.28 in) long, with narrow bracts 3–5 mm (0.12–0.20 in) long at the base. The flowers are 6–8 mm (0.24–0.31 in) in diameter with 5 white petal-like sepals with a red base, and 5 rounded petals with a yellowish, stalked base. There are 3 staminodes between each pair of stamens, the central one egg-shaped and the other two linear. Flowering occurs from July to October.

== Taxonomy ==
Androcalva bivillosa was first formally described in 2011 by Carolyn Wilkins in Australian Systematic Botany from specimens collected from near Northampton in 2003. The specific epithet (bivillosa) means "two villous", referring to the two different types of hairs on the plant.

== Distribution and habitat ==
This species grows in kwongan woodland and remnant roadside vegetation in only 3 known locations near Northampton and Ajana in the Geraldton Sandplains bioregion of south-western Western Australia.

== Conservation status ==
Androcalva bivillosa is listed as "threatened" by the Western Australian Government Department of Biodiversity, Conservation and Attractions, meaning that it is in danger of extinction.
