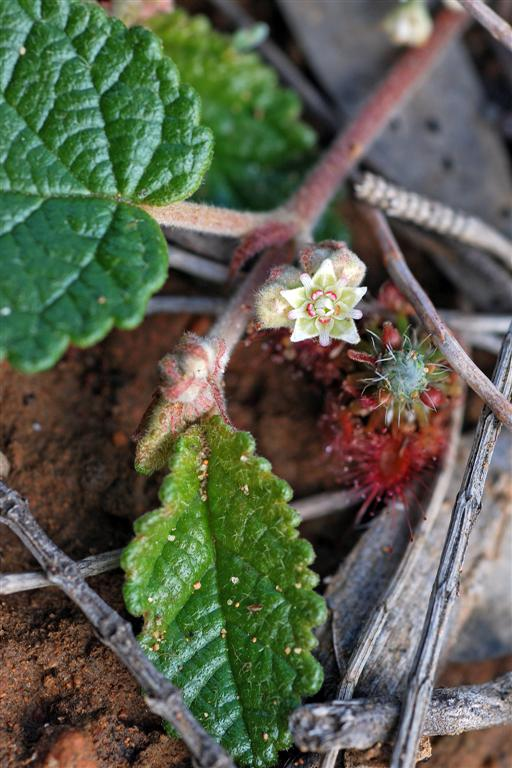

Conservation status
- Priority One — Poorly Known Taxa (DEC)

Scientific classification
- Kingdom: Plantae
- Clade: Embryophytes
- Clade: Tracheophytes
- Clade: Spermatophytes
- Clade: Angiosperms
- Clade: Eudicots
- Clade: Rosids
- Order: Malvales
- Family: Malvaceae
- Genus: Androcalva
- Species: A. fragifolia

Binomial name
- Androcalva fragifolia C.F.Wilkins

Synonyms
- List: Commersonia sp. Bindoon (C.Wilkins & F. & J.Hort CW 2155) WA Herbarium; Rulingia cuneata auct. non Turcz.: Blackall, W.E. & Grieve, B.J. (1974); Rulingia cuneata auct. non Turcz.: Grieve, B.J. (1998)

= Androcalva fragifolia =

Species of shrub

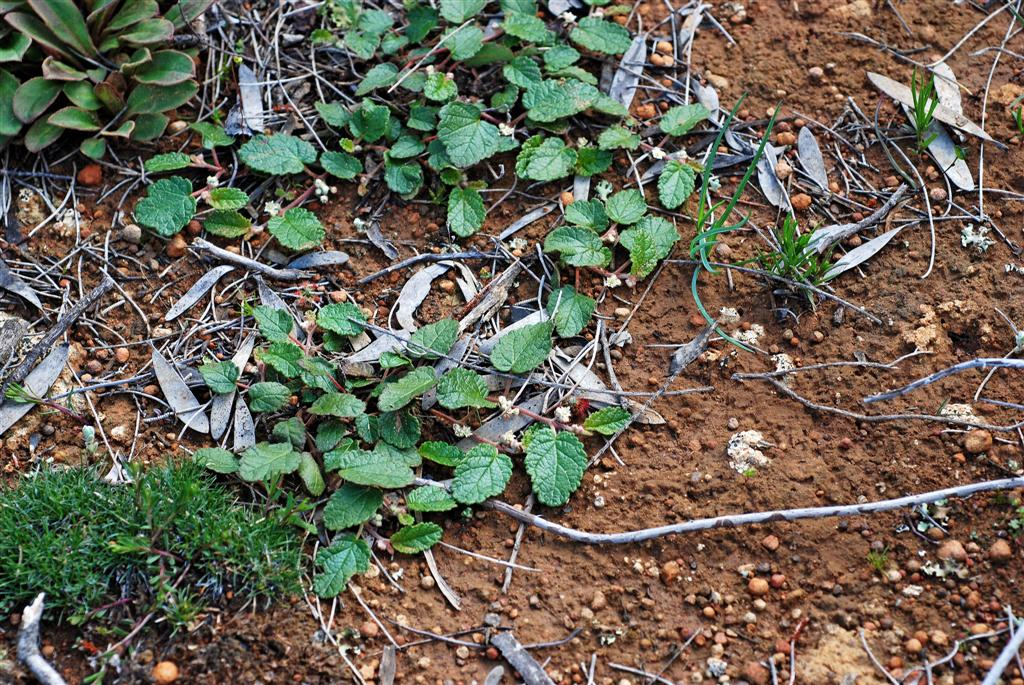
Habit

Androcalva fragifolia is a species of flowering plant in the family Malvaceae and is endemic to the south-west of Western Australia. It is a straggling, prostrate shrub with glossy, broadly egg-shaped leaves, and creamy white flowers.

== Description ==
Androcalva fragifolia is a straggling, prostrate, ground-covering shrub that typically grows to 5 cm (2.0 in) high and 10–40 cm (3.9–15.7 in) wide, its new growth covered with white, star-shaped hairs. The leaves are broadly egg-shaped, 6–25 mm (0.24–0.98 in) long and 5–18 mm (0.20–0.71 in) wide on a petiole 1–4 mm (0.039–0.157 in) long with stipules 1.5–4.5 mm (0.059–0.177 in) long at the base. The leaves are glossy with lobed and toothed edges, impressed veins on the upper surface and white, star-shaped hairs below. The flowers are arranged singly or in small groups on a peduncle 1–2 mm (0.039–0.079 in) long, each flower on a pedicel 1–3 mm (0.039–0.118 in) long, with egg-shaped bracts 1–3 mm (0.039–0.118 in) long at the base. The flowers are 5–6 mm (0.20–0.24 in) wide with 5 pink to creamy-white petal-like sepals and 5 petals, the ligule creamy-white with a pinkish base and almost as long as the sepals. There are 3 staminodes between each pair of stamens, the central one egg-shaped and the other two linear. Flowering occurs in October, November and February.

== Taxonomy ==
Androcalva fragifolia was first formally described in 2011 by Carolyn Wilkins in Australian Systematic Botany from specimens collected from near the Bindoon army training land in 2006. The specific epithet (fragifolia) means "strawberry-leaved".

== Distribution and habitat ==
This species grows in forest and around rock outcrops in 4 populations between Wongan Hills and Bindoon in the Avon Wheatbelt and Jarrah Forest bioregions of south-western Western Australia.

== Conservation status ==
Androcalva fragifolia is listed as "Priority One" by the Government of Western Australia Department of Biodiversity, Conservation and Attractions, meaning that it is known from only one or a few locations which are potentially at risk.
