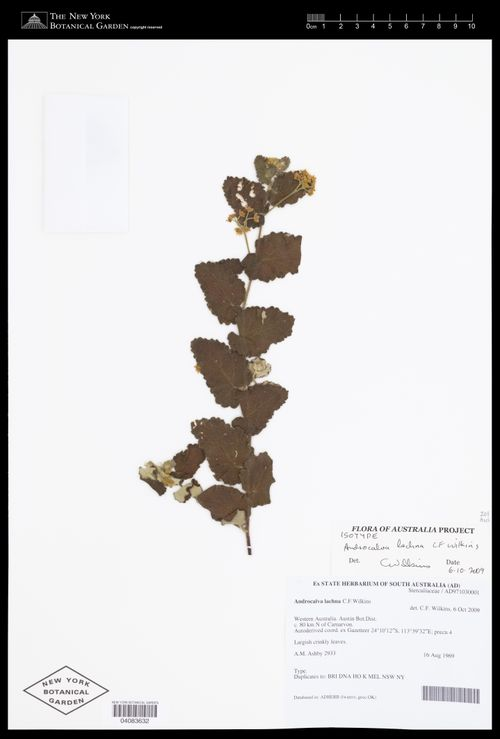
- Isotype in New York Botanical Garden

Scientific classification
- Kingdom: Plantae
- Clade: Embryophytes
- Clade: Tracheophytes
- Clade: Spermatophytes
- Clade: Angiosperms
- Clade: Eudicots
- Clade: Rosids
- Order: Malvales
- Family: Malvaceae
- Genus: Androcalva
- Species: A. lachna

Binomial name
- Androcalva lachna C.F.Wilkins

= Androcalva lachna =

Species of shrub

Androcalva lachna is a species of flowering plant in the family Malvaceae and is endemic to the far west of Western Australia. It is an erect shrub with egg-shaped leaves, and heads of 4 to 12 white and pink flowers.

== Description ==
Androcalva lachna is an erect shrub that typically grows to 20–90 cm (7.9–35.4 in) high and 40–150 cm (16–59 in) wide, and has hairy young stems. Its leaves are egg-shaped, 10–30 mm (0.39–1.18 in) long and 12–19 mm (0.47–0.75 in) wide on a petiole 2–4 mm (0.079–0.157 in) long with stipules 3–7 mm (0.12–0.28 in) long at the base. The edges of the leaves are rolled under and have irregular serrations, both surfaces densely covered with white, star-shaped and glandular hairs. The flowers are arranged in heads of 4 to 12 on a peduncle 7–25 mm (0.28–0.98 in) long, each flower on a pedicel 2–9 mm (0.079–0.354 in) long, with triangular bracts 2–5 mm (0.079–0.197 in) long at the base. The flowers are 7–9 mm (0.28–0.35 in) wide with 5 white, petal-like sepals with a pink base, and 5 petals, the ligule shorter than the sepal lobes. There are 3 staminodes between each pair of stamens. Flowering occurs from August to November.

== Taxonomy ==
Androcalva lachna was first formally described in 2011 by Carolyn Wilkins in Australian Systematic Botany from specimens collected north of Carnarvon by Alison Marjorie Ashby in 1969. The specific epithet (lachna) means "soft wool", referring to the leaves.

== Distribution and habitat ==
This species grows on the slopes of sand dunes and in the swales with spinifex, in the Kennedy Range National Park and north of Carnarvon.

== Conservation status ==
Androcalva lachna is listed as "not threatened" by the Government of Western Australia Department of Biodiversity, Conservation and Attractions.
