= Androcalva adenothalia =

Conservation status
- Critically endangered (EPBC Act)

Scientific classification
- Kingdom: Plantae
- Clade: Embryophytes
- Clade: Tracheophytes
- Clade: Spermatophytes
- Clade: Angiosperms
- Clade: Eudicots
- Clade: Rosids
- Order: Malvales
- Family: Malvaceae
- Genus: Androcalva
- Species: A. adenothalia

Binomial name
- Androcalva adenothalia C.F.Wilkins

Synonyms
- Commersonia adenothalia C.F.Wilkins MS; Commersonia sp. Canna (C.F.Wilkins 2030) WA Herbarium; Rulingia loxophylla auct. non F.Muell.: Grieve, B.J. (1998)

Species of shrub

Androcalva adenothalia is a species of flowering plant in the family Malvaceae and is endemic to the south-west of Western Australia. It is a prostrate shrub with hairy stems, broadly egg-shaped leaves with rounded teeth on the edges, and clusters of 4 to 9 or more white flowers.

== Description ==
Androcalva adenothalia is a prostrate shrub that typically grows up to 5 cm (2.0 in) high and 10–25 mm (0.39–0.98 in) wide, its stems covered with glandular and star-shaped hairs. The leaves are broadly egg-shaped, 4–24 mm (0.16–0.94 in) long and 4–20 mm (0.16–0.79 in) wide on a petiole 2–12 mm (0.079–0.472 in) long with narrowly egg-shaped stipules 2–4 mm (0.079–0.157 in) long at the base. The upper surface of the leaves has deeply impressed veins, the lower surface is densely covered with both glandular and star-shaped hairs, and the edges of the leaves have irregular, rounded teeth. The flowers are arranged in clusters of 4 to 9 or more on a peduncle 1–6 mm (0.039–0.236 in) long, each flower on a pedicel 1–4 mm (0.039–0.157 in) long, with narrowly egg-shaped bracts 1–4 mm (0.039–0.157 in) long at the base. The flowers are pink in the bud stage, later white and 4–5 mm (0.16–0.20 in) in diameter with 5 white, petal-like sepals, the lobes 3–4 mm (0.12–0.16 in) long, and 5 rounded petals, the ligules slightly shorter than the sepals. There is a single staminode, sometimes 3, between each pair of stamens. Flowering occurs from August to October.

== Taxonomy ==
Androcalva adenothalia was first formally described in 2011 by Carolyn Wilkins in Australian Systematic Botany from specimens collected near Canna in 2005. The specific epithet (adenothalia) means "abundant glands", referring to the glandular hairs on the stems, pedicels and sepals.

== Distribution and habitat ==
This species was only known from the type location near Canna in the Avon Wheatbelt of south-western Western Australia, where it grew on a disturbed roadside that has since been burnt and cleared by roadworks. The species has been propagated using tissue culture.

== Conservation status ==
Androcalva adenothalia is listed as "critically endangered" under the Australian Government Environment Protection and Biodiversity Conservation Act 1999 and as "Threatened" by the Western Australian Government Department of Biodiversity, Conservation and Attractions, meaning that it is in danger of extinction.
