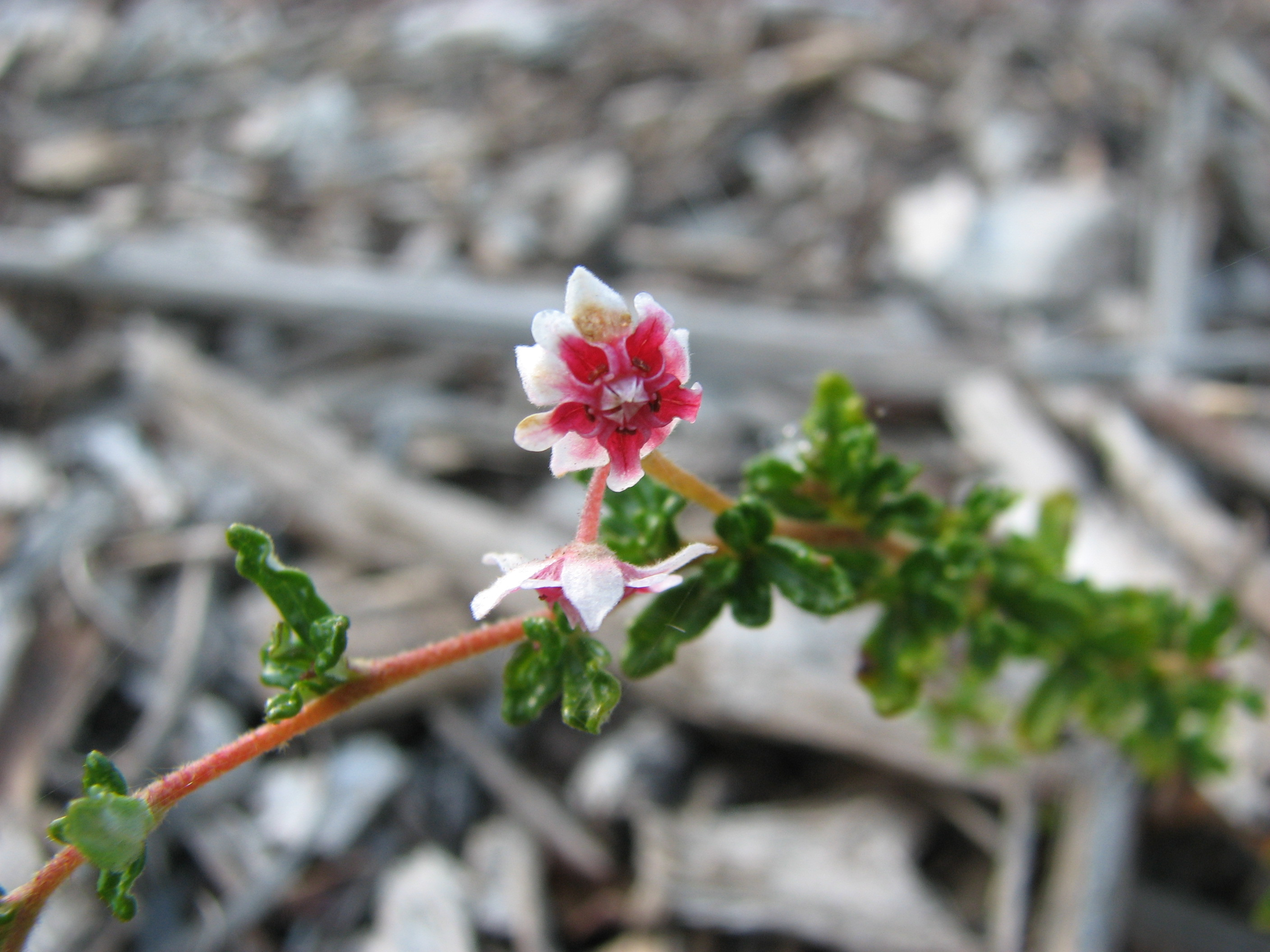

Scientific classification
- Kingdom: Plantae
- Clade: Tracheophytes
- Clade: Angiosperms
- Clade: Eudicots
- Clade: Rosids
- Order: Malvales
- Family: Malvaceae
- Genus: Androcalva
- Species: A. tatei

Binomial name
- Androcalva tatei (F.Muell. ex Tate) C.F.Wilkins & Whitlock

Synonyms
- Commersonia tatei F.Muell. ex Tate

= Androcalva tatei =

Species of plant

Androcalva tatei, commonly known as trailing commersonia, is a small shrub that is endemic to Australia. The species occurs in the states of South Australia and Victoria, where it is endangered.
