= Barbara Ann Whitlock =

American botanist (born 1967)

- Born: 1967 (age 58–59)
- Education: Harvard University; University of Wisconsin–Madison; University of Missouri
- Scientific career
- Workplaces: University of Miami (2003–present); Fairchild Tropical Botanic Garden (2003)
- Thesis: Systematics and evolution of chocolate and its relatives (Sterculiaceae or Malvaceae s.l.) (c. 2000)
- Author abbrev. (botany): Whitlock

Barbara Ann Whitlock (born 1967) is an American botanist. She earned a Ph.D. from Harvard University, with her dissertation Systematics and evolution of chocolate and its relatives (Sterculiaceae or Malvaceae s.l.) c. 2000, an interest which continues.

She has been working in the Department of Biology, University of Miami from at least 2015, where she works on tropical (plant) biology, and ecology and evolutionary biology.

Much of her work centres on Malvaceae and related phylogeny.

She has published 39 names, including Androcalva fraseri, and Commersonia borealis. (See also Taxa named by Barbara Ann Whitlock.)

The standard author abbreviation Whitlock is used to indicate this person as the author when citing a botanical name.
