= Carolyn F. Wilkins =

Australian botanist

- Born: 1945
- Alma mater: University of Western Australia
- Academic career
- Institutions: Western Australian Herbarium
- Author abbrev. (botany): C.F.Wilkins

Carolyn Frances Wilkins (born 1945) is an Australian botanist, who currently (April 2020) works for the Western Australian Department of Biodiversity, Conservation and Attractions.

Wilkins graduated from the University of Western Australia with a PhD for her thesis, "A systematic study of Lasiopetaleae (Malvaceae s.l. or Sterculiaceae)".

She (together with others) has revised the genera, Jacksonia and Guichenotia, and much of her work has been on the Malvaceae and on the Mirbelieae.

She has published 103 names.

The standard author abbreviation C.F.Wilkins is used to indicate this person as the author when citing a botanical name.
