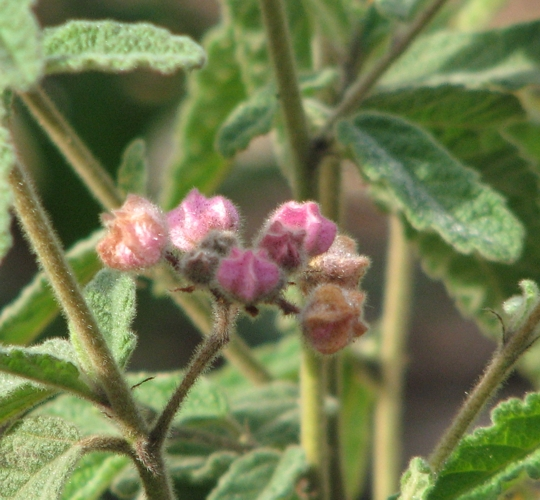
- Commersonia magniflora, (previously Rulingia magniflora) in Geelong Botanic Gardens

Scientific classification
- Kingdom: Plantae
- Clade: Tracheophytes
- Clade: Angiosperms
- Clade: Eudicots
- Clade: Rosids
- Order: Malvales
- Family: Malvaceae
- Subfamily: Byttnerioideae
- Tribe: Lasiopetaleae
- Genus: Rulingia; R.Br.

Type species
- Rulingia pannosa R.Br.

Species
- See text

= Rulingia =

Genus of flowering plants

Rulingia is a genus of flowering plants native to Australia and Madagascar. In 2011, all species were transferred to Commersonia with the exception of Rulingia cuneata, R. loxophylla, R. luteiflora and R. procumbens which have been transferred to the new genus Androcalva.

Species formerly placed in the genus included:

- Rulingia borealis (E.Pritz.) C.F.Wilkins (now Commersonia borealis (E.Pritz.) C.F.Wilkins & Whitlock)
- Rulingia corylifolia Graham (now Commersonia corylifolia (Graham) C.F.Wilkins & Whitlock ) – hazel-leaved rulingia
- Rulingia craurophylla F.Muell. (now Commersonia craurophylla (F.Muell.) F. Muell.) – brittle leaved rulingia
- Rulingia cuneata Turcz. (now Androcalva cuneata (Turcz.) C.F.Wilkins & Whitlock)
- Rulingia cygnorum (Steud.) C.A.Gardner (now a synonym of Commersonia corniculata (Sm.) K.A.Sheph. & C.F.Wilkins)
- Rulingia dasyphylla (Andrews) Sweet (now Commersonia dasyphylla Andrews) – kerrawang
- Rulingia densiflora (Turcz.) Benth. (now Commersonia densiflora (Turcz.) F.Muell.)
- Rulingia grandiflora Endl. (now Commersonia grandiflora (Endl.) C.F.Wilkins & Whitlock)
- Rulingia hermanniifolia (J.Gay ex Kunth) Endl. (now Commersonia hermanniifolia J.Gay ex Kunth)
- Rulingia loxophylla F.Muell. (now Androcalva loxophylla (F.Muell.) C.F.Wilkins & Whitlock)
- Rulingia luteiflora E.Pritz. (now Androcalva luteiflora (E. Pritz.) C.F.Wilkins & Whitlock)
- Rulingia madagascariensis Baker (now Commersonia madagascariensis (Baker) C.F.Wilkins & Whitlock)
- Rulingia magniflora F.Muell. (now Commersonia magniflora (F.Muell.) F. Muell.)
- Rulingia malvifolia Steetz (now a synonym of Commersonia corniculata (Sm.) K.A.Sheph. & C.F.Wilkins)
- Rulingia parviflora Endl. (now Commersonia parviflora (Endl.) F.Muell.) – small-flowered rulingia
- Rulingia platycalyx Benth. (now a synonym of Commersonia parviflora (Endl.) F.Muell.)
- Rulingia procumbens Maiden & Betche (now Androcalva procumbens (Maiden & Betche) C.F.Wilkins & Whitlock)
- Rulingia prostrata Maiden & Betche (now a synonym of Commersonia prostrata (Maiden & Betche) C.F.Wilkins & Whitlock) – dwarf kerrawang
- Rulingia rotundifolia Turcz. (now Commersonia rotundifolia (Turcz.) F. Muell.) – round-leaved rulingia
- Rulingia rugosa Steetz (now Commersonia rugosa (Steetz) F. Muell.)
- Rulingia salviifolia (Hook. ex Steetz) Benth. (now Commersonia salviifolia (Hook. ex Steetz) F.Muell.)
- Rulingia tratmannii C.R.P.Andrews (now a synonym of Commersonia craurophylla (F.Muell.) F. Muell.)
