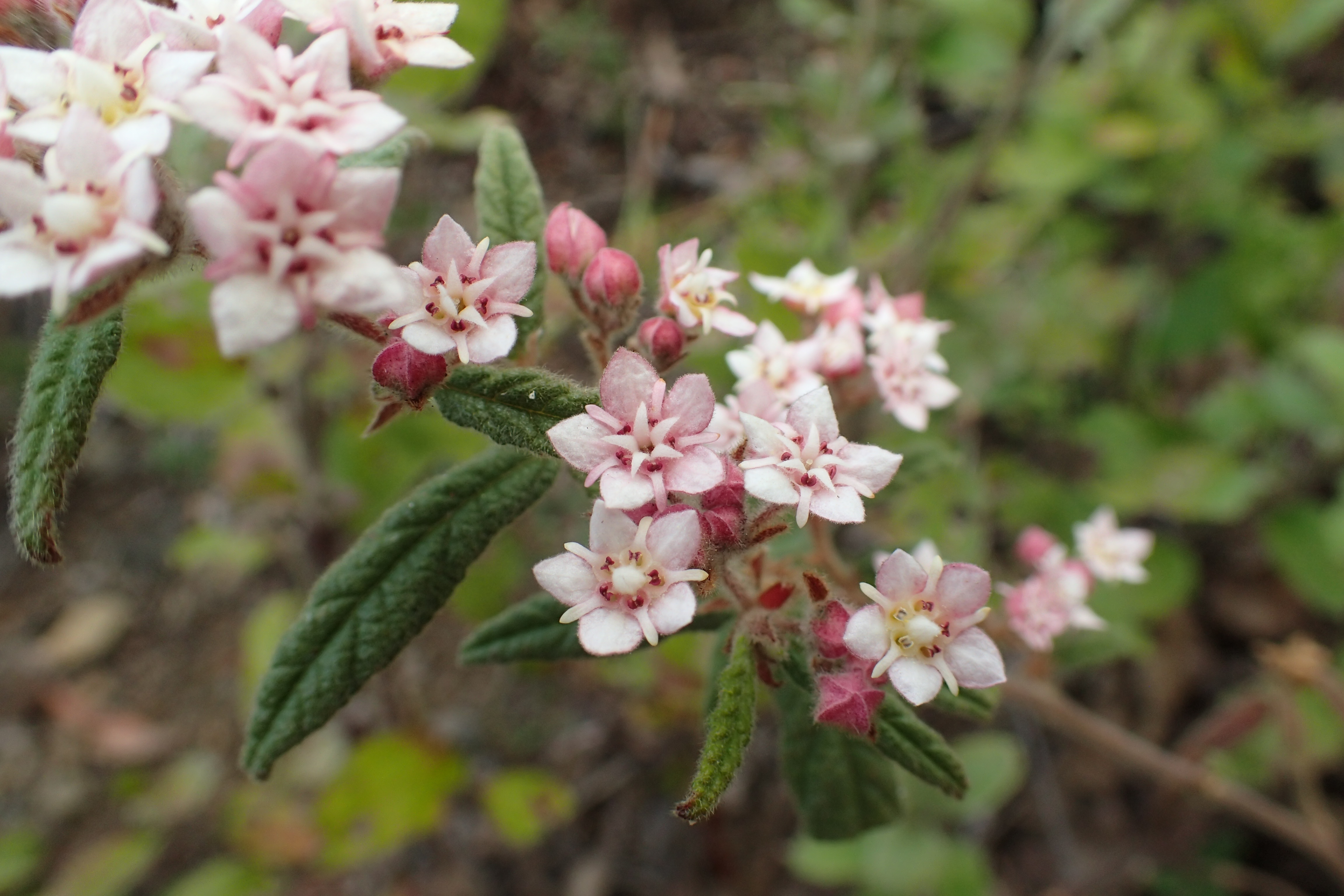
- In the Gibraltar Range National Park

Scientific classification
- Kingdom: Plantae
- Clade: Tracheophytes
- Clade: Angiosperms
- Clade: Eudicots
- Clade: Rosids
- Order: Malvales
- Family: Malvaceae
- Genus: Commersonia
- Species: C. dasyphylla

Binomial name
- Commersonia dasyphylla Andrews

Synonyms
- List: Buettneria dasyphylla F.Muell. orth. var.; Buettneria pannosa Benth. orth. var.; Buttneria dasyphylla J.Gay orth. var.; Buttneria inodora DC. nom. inval., pro syn.; Byttneria dasyphylla (Andrews) J.Gay; Byttneria dasyphylla (Andrews) DC. isonym; Byttneria pannosa (R.Br.) DC.; Lasiopetalum tomentosum J.Gay nom. inval., pro syn.; Restiaria dasyphylla (Andrews) Kuntze; Rulingia dasyphylla (Andrews) Sweet; Rulingia pannosa R.Br.

= Commersonia dasyphylla =

Species of flowering plant

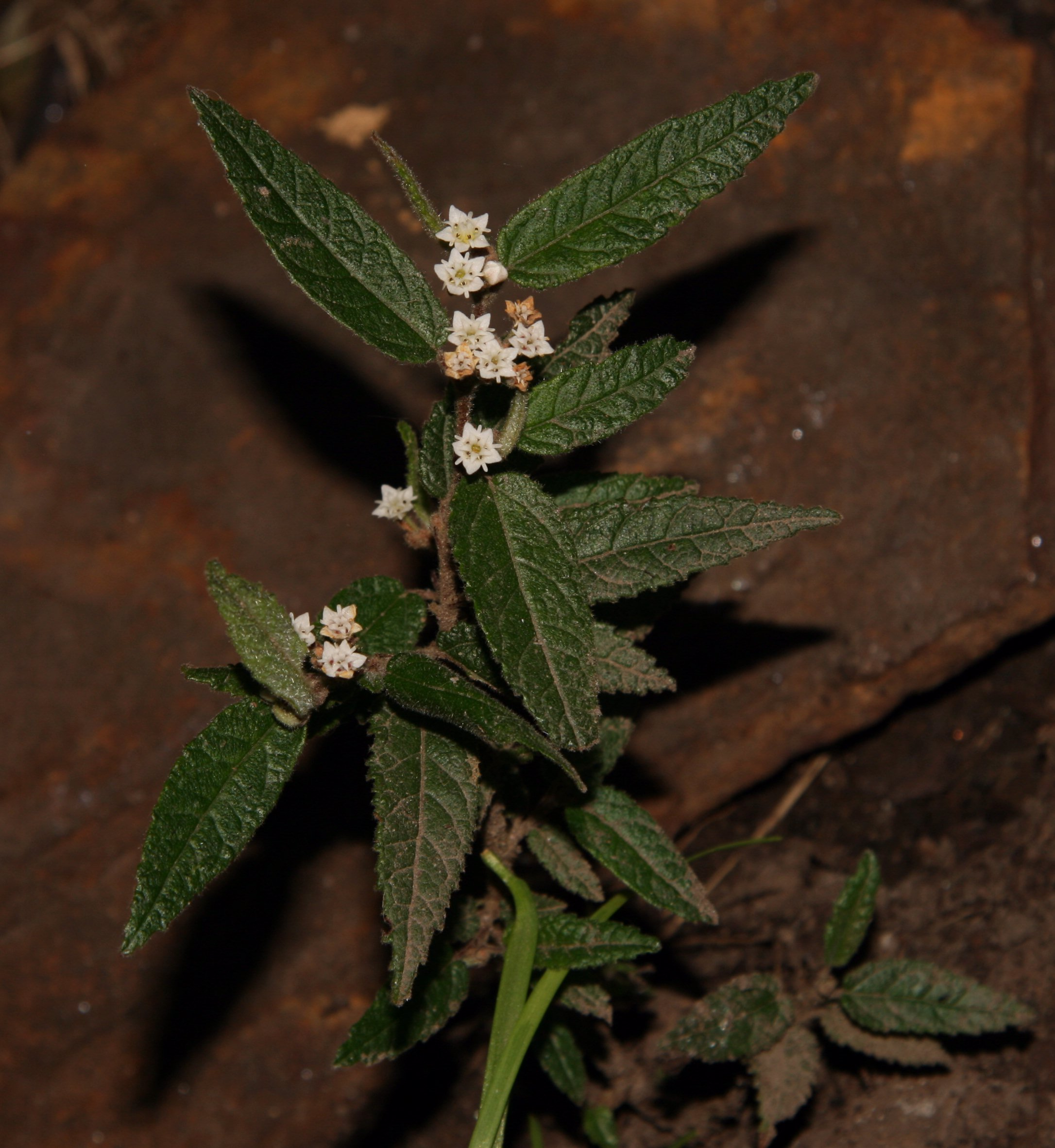
A young plant cultivated in Sydney

Commersonia dasyphylla, commonly known as kerrawang, is a species of flowering plant of the family Malvaceae and is endemic to eastern continental Australia. It is a shrub with egg-shaped to lance-shaped with irregular edges and flowers in groups of up to 21, followed by hairy brown capsules.

== Description ==
Kerrawang grows as a shrub reaching 1–4 m (3 ft 3 in – 13 ft 1 in) in height with its stems covered in fine hairs. The dark green leaves are prominently wrinkled, egg-shaped to lance-shaped, 30–70 mm (1.2–2.8 in) long and 5–30 mm (0.20–1.18 in) wide on a petiole 2–5 mm (0.079–0.197 in) long, and have toothed or lobed margins. The upper surface of the leaves is hairy and the lower surface is densely covered with white, star-shaped hairs. The flowers are arranged in groups of ten to twenty-one, each flower about 8 mm (0.31 in) in diameter. The sepals are 3–5.5 mm (0.12–0.22 in) long and 1.5–3.5 mm (0.059–0.138 in) wide, the petals pinkish or white and about half as long as the sepals. Flowering occurs from September to January and the flowers are followed by hairy brown capsules 5–7 mm (0.20–0.28 in) in diameter.

Commersonia dasyphylla is very similar to C. breviseta and C. rugosa and is difficult to distinguish without fruit, other than from the structure of the star-shaped flowers on the lower leaf surface.

== Taxonomy ==
Commersonia dasyphylla was initially described in 1810 by Henry Cranke Andrews in his book The Botanist's Repository for New, and Rare Plants. It was then placed in the genus Rulingia by Robert Sweet in 1826 where it remained until its original name was restored in 2011. The genus name commemorates 18th-century French naturalist Philibert Commerson, while the species name is derived from Ancient Greek dasys "hairy" and phyllon "leaf", and refers to cottonlike hairs covering the leaves.

== Range and ecology ==
The range is across eastern Australia from southeastern Queensland through New South Wales and into eastern Victoria, the preferred habitat is gullies in forested areas. Flies are the likely most common pollinators, and native bees, beetles, and diurnal moths may do so as well. The kerrawang is killed by bushfire and regenerates from seed.

== Conservation status ==
In Victoria, the species is listed as "threatened" under the Flora and Fauna Guarantee Act 1988 and "vulnerable" on the Department of Sustainability and Environment's Advisory List of Rare Or Threatened Plants in Victoria.

== Uses ==
Its fibres were used for basket making by the local Cadigal people of Sydney. The kerrawang, an Australian shrub, should not be confused with the kurrajong, an Australian tree whose bark is used to make twine.

First cultivated in England in 1819 as Rulingia pannosa, the kerrawang is a fast-growing and ornamental shrub. It prefers semishaded areas with fair drainage and mildly acid soil. It seeds readily, and can be easily propagated from seed or cuttings.
