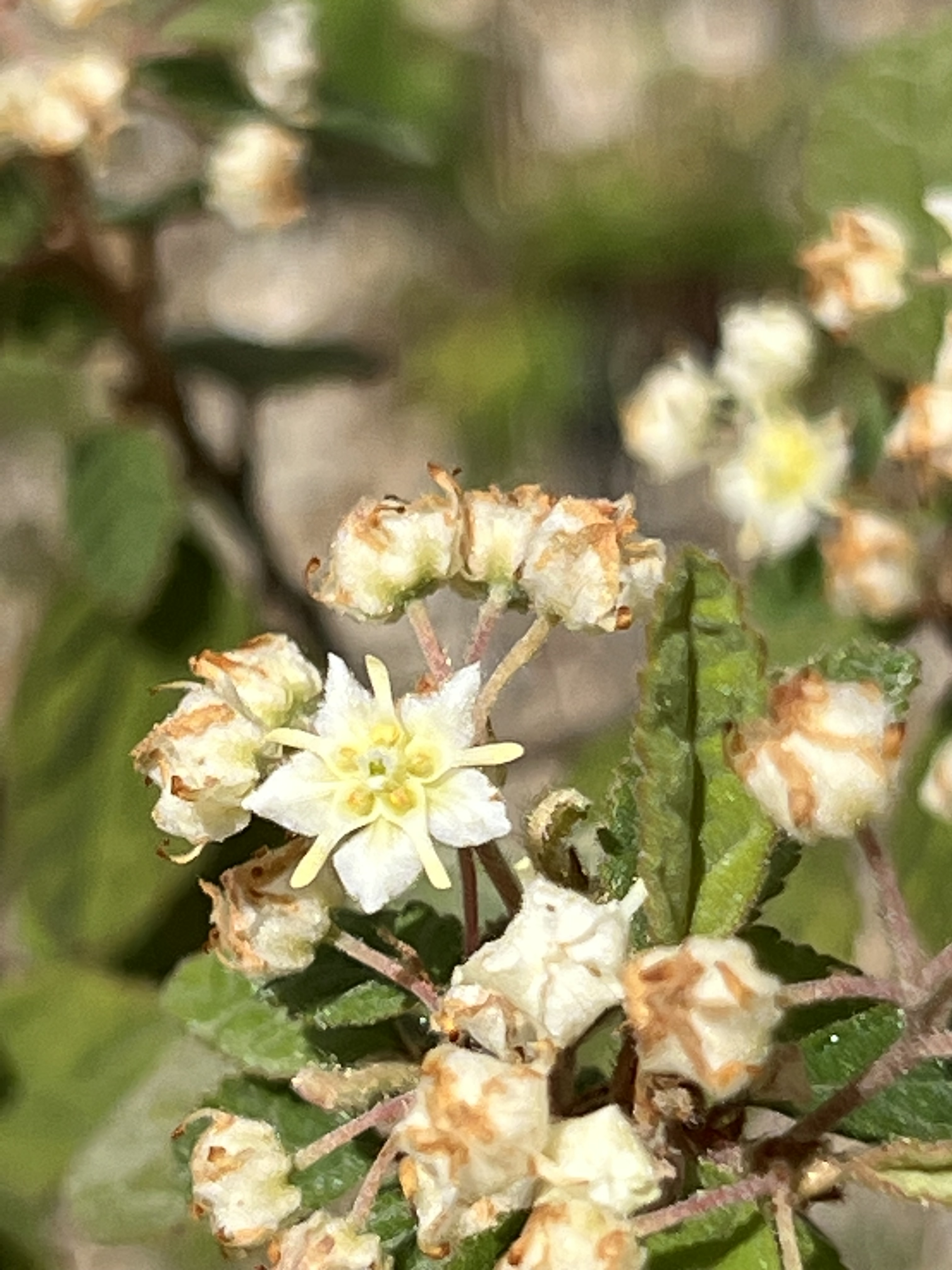

Conservation status
- Critically endangered (EPBC Act)

Scientific classification
- Kingdom: Plantae
- Clade: Tracheophytes
- Clade: Angiosperms
- Clade: Eudicots
- Clade: Rosids
- Order: Malvales
- Family: Malvaceae
- Genus: Commersonia
- Species: C. apella

Binomial name
- Commersonia apella C.F.Wilkins

= Commersonia apella =

Many-flowered commersonia

Species of flowering plant

Commersonia apella, commonly known as many-flowered commersonia, is a small, upright shrub in the family Malvaceae and is endemic to Western Australia. It has hairy leaves and whitish flowers.

== Description ==
Commersonia apella is an upright, spreading shrub, 1.5–2 m (4 ft 11 in – 6 ft 7 in) high and 1–2.5 m (3 ft 3 in – 8 ft 2 in) wide. The new growth stems are sessile or have short stalks, glandular, yellowish, and covered with star-shaped hairs. The leaves are oval-shaped, margins finely toothed, grey-green on upper surface with a thick covering of short, matted, star-shaped, sessile, white hairs, paler underneath and slightly wrinkled and soft, 8–30 mm (0.31–1.18 in) long, 4–14 mm (0.16–0.55 in) wide and the older leaf petioles 2.8–4 mm (0.11–0.16 in) long and rounded or pointed at the apex. The inflorescence are borne opposite a leaf on a flowering branch 7.5–23.5 mm (0.30–0.93 in) long in clusters of 3-15 on a peduncle 1.5–12 mm (0.059–0.472 in) long, individual flowers on stalk 2.5–6.8 mm (0.098–0.268 in) long. The pedicel and peduncle are both thickly covered with sessile, yellow or white star-shaped hairs. The bracts are oval or narrowly elliptic shaped, 1.5–4 mm (0.059–0.157 in) long, 0.3–1.0 mm (0.012–0.039 in) wide, buds blunt at the base, apex rounded and ribbed. The calyx are green near the base, oval-shaped, white, 3.3–4.5 mm (0.13–0.18 in) long, pointed at the apex, upper surface smooth, simple or star-shaped hairs, lower surface thickly covered with white, star-shaped hairs. The flower petals are yellowish-cream, 2.2–2.7 mm (0.087–0.106 in) long, 1.1–1.6 mm (0.043–0.063 in) wide and swollen near the base. The fruit is ellipsoid shaped, about 2.3–4.5 mm (0.091–0.177 in) long and covered with thick, soft, star-shaped hairs.

== Taxonomy and naming ==
Commersonia apella was first formally described in 2011 by Carolyn F. Wilkins and the description was published in Australian Systematic Botany from specimens collected west of Denmark in 1978. The specific epithet (apella) means "without a bowl", referring to the petals that are not deeply pouched.

== Distribution and habitat ==
Many-flowered commersonia grows in sandy clay in woodland, forest and coastal location between Pemberton and Esperance, but has not been recently located.

== Conservation status ==
Commersonia apella is listed as "critically endangered' under the Australian Government Environment Protection and Biodiversity Conservation Act 1999 and as "Threatened" by the Western Australian Government Department of Biodiversity, Conservation and Attractions, meaning that it is in danger of extinction.
