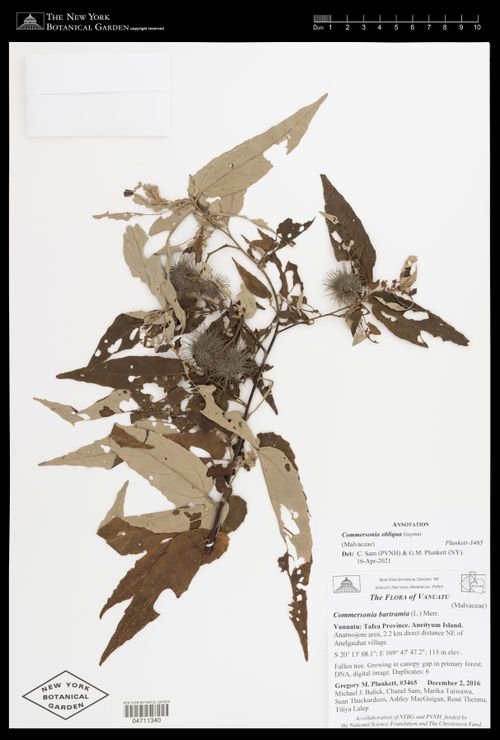
- Holotype in New York Botanical Garden

Scientific classification
- Kingdom: Plantae
- Clade: Tracheophytes
- Clade: Angiosperms
- Clade: Eudicots
- Clade: Rosids
- Order: Malvales
- Family: Malvaceae
- Genus: Commersonia
- Species: C. obliqua

Binomial name
- Commersonia obliqua Guymer

= Commersonia obliqua =

Species of flowering plant

Commersonia obliqua is a species of flowering plant in the family Malvaceae and is endemic to Vanuatu. It is a shrub or tree with lance-shaped leaves and white flowers.

== Description ==
Commersonia obliqua is a shrub or tree that typically grows to a height of 3–15 m (9.8–49.2 ft), its branchlets covered with soft, star-shaped hairs. The leaves are lance-shaped, 50–177 mm (2.0–7.0 in) long and 18–62 mm (0.71–2.44 in) wide on a petiole 4.0–11.5 mm (0.16–0.45 in) long with narrowly triangular stipules 2.6–6 mm (0.10–0.24 in) long at the base. The flowers are 5–6 mm (0.20–0.24 in) in diameter with five petal-like sepals, the lobes broadly egg-shaped, 1.3–2.0 mm (0.051–0.079 in) long, and five petals 2.5–3.3 mm (0.098–0.130 in) long with a ligule 1.7–2.0 mm (0.067–0.079 in) long on the end. Flowering occurs from April to September and the fruit is a bristly capsule 27–32 mm (1.1–1.3 in) in diameter.

== Taxonomy ==
Commersonia obliqua was first formally described in 2005 by Gordon P. Guymer in the journal Austrobaileya from specimens collected near Undine Bay in 1928. The specific epithet (obliqua) refers to the oblique leaf bases.

== Distribution and habitat ==
This commersonia grows in tropical lowland rainforest in Vanuatu.
