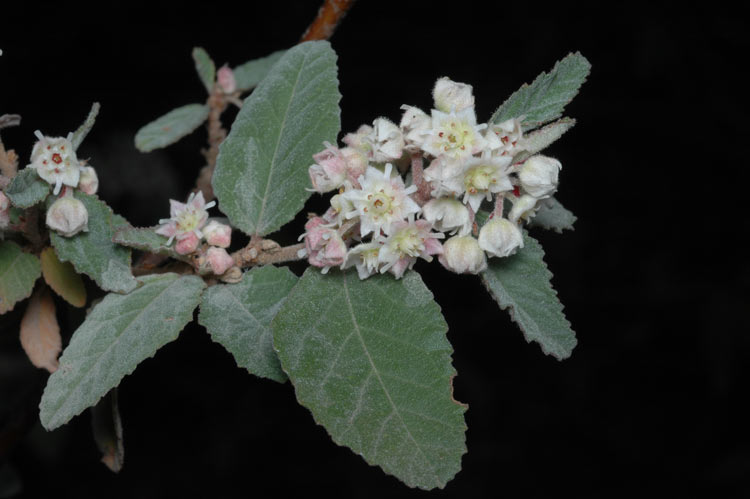
- Commersonia erythrogyna in the Australian National Botanic Gardens

Conservation status
- Endangered (EPBC Act)

Scientific classification
- Kingdom: Plantae
- Clade: Tracheophytes
- Clade: Angiosperms
- Clade: Eudicots
- Clade: Rosids
- Order: Malvales
- Family: Malvaceae
- Genus: Commersonia
- Species: C. erythrogyna

Binomial name
- Commersonia erythrogyna C.F.Wilkins

= Commersonia erythrogyna =

Trigwell's rulingia

Species of flowering plant

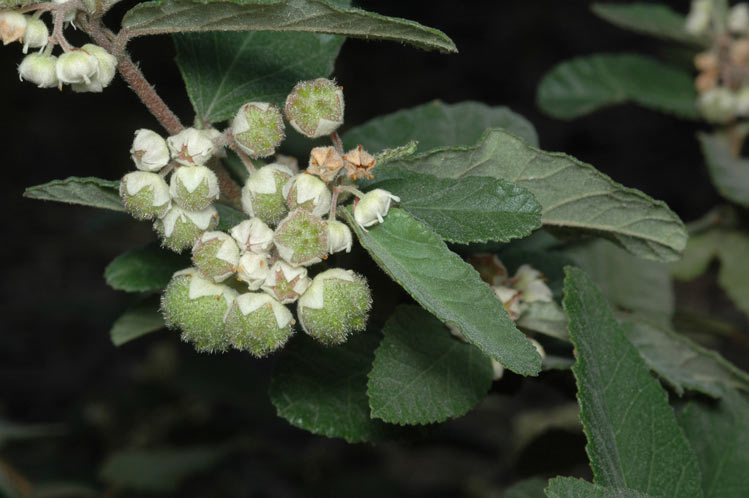
Fruit, in Kings Park

Habit

Commersonia erythrogyna, commonly known as Trigwell's rulingia, is a species of flowering plant in the family Malvaceae and is endemic to a restricted part of the south-west of Western Australia. It is an open, straggly shrub with oblong to egg-shaped leaves and creamy-white flowers.

== Description ==
Commersonia erythrogyna is an erect, straggly shrub that typically grows to 1–2 m (3 ft 3 in – 6 ft 7 in) high and 1.5–2.0 m (4 ft 11 in – 6 ft 7 in) wide, its new growth covered with white, star-shaped hairs. The leaves are oblong to egg-shaped, 4–19 mm (0.16–0.75 in) long and 3–12 mm (0.12–0.47 in) wide on a petiole 1–4 mm (0.039–0.157 in) long with stipules 1–4 mm (0.039–0.157 in) long at the base. The edges of the leaves sometimes have irregular teeth, and both surfaces are covered with fine, white, star-shaped hairs. The flowers are arranged in clusters of 3 to 7 on the ends of branches or opposite leaves on a peduncle 2–6 mm (0.079–0.236 in) long, each flower on a pedicel 5–20 mm (0.20–0.79 in) long with a bract 1–3 mm (0.039–0.118 in) long at the base. The flowers are 7–9 mm (0.28–0.35 in) wide with five creamy-white, petal-like sepals, five white petals with a narrow ligule, and a single, sparsely hairy white staminode between each pair of stamens. Flowering occurs from August to October and the fruit is a hairy, bristly capsule 8–10 mm (0.31–0.39 in) in diameter.

== Taxonomy and naming ==
Commersonia erythrogyna was first formally described in 2011 by Carolyn F. Wilkins and the description was published in Australian Systematic Botany from specimens collected near Boyup Brook in 2003. The specific epithet (erythrogyna) means "red female organs", referring to the reddish hairs on the ovary.

== Distribution and habitat ==
Trigwell's rulingia grows in low, open jarrah and marri woodland in a single wild population of 2 mature plants on private farmland, but in 2003, five translocation sites, also on private property, have been established.

== Conservation status ==
Commersonia erythrogyna is listed as "endangered' under the Australian Government Environment Protection and Biodiversity Conservation Act 1999 and as "threatened" by the Western Australian Government Department of Biodiversity, Conservation and Attractions, meaning that it is in danger of extinction.
