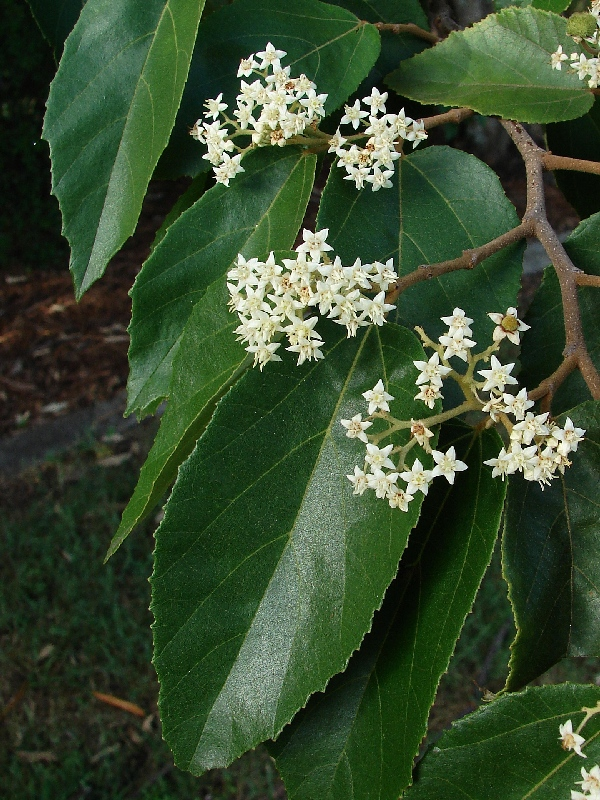
- Commersonia bartramia

Scientific classification
- Kingdom: Plantae
- Clade: Tracheophytes
- Clade: Angiosperms
- Clade: Eudicots
- Clade: Rosids
- Order: Malvales
- Family: Malvaceae
- Subfamily: Byttnerioideae
- Tribe: Lasiopetaleae
- Genus: Commersonia; J.R.Forst. & G.Forst.

Species
- See text

Synonyms
- Achilleopsis Turcz. nom. rej.; Buettnera J.F.Gmel. orth. var.; Buettneria Murray orth. var.; Buttneria J.Gay orth. var.; Byttneria Loefl. nom. cons.; Commerconia F.Muell. orth. var.; Ruelingia Diels & E.Pritz. orth. var.; Rulingia R.Br. nom. cons.; Rulingia sect. Eurulingia Steetz nom. inval.; Rulingia sect. Saccophora Steetz; Rullingia Endl. orth. var.

= Commersonia =

Genus of flowering plants

Commersonia is a genus of twenty-five species of flowering plants in the family Malvaceae. Plants in this genus are shrubs or trees, occurring from Indochina to Australia and have stems, leaves and flowers covered with star-like hairs. The leaves are simple, often with irregularly-toothed edges, the flowers bisexual with five sepals, five petals and five stamens and the fruit a capsule with five valves. The genus underwent a revision in 2011 and some species were separated from Commersonia, others were added from Rulingia.

== Taxonomy ==
The genus Commersonia was first formally described in 1775 by Johann Reinhold Forster and his son Georg Forster in the book Characteres generum plantarum and the first species they described was Commersonia echinata, now known as Commersonia bartramia.

A revision of the genus in 2011 added 3 newly described species, as well as 14 species previously included in Rulingia, and transferred a number of species to the newly created genus Androcalva.

The genus is named after Philibert Commerson (1727–73), a French naturalist who sailed with the Bougainville expedition in 1766 and died on Mauritius.

== Species list ==
The following is a list of species of Commersonia accepted by Plants of the World Online as at December 2020:

- Commersonia amystia C.F.Wilkins & L.M.Copel. (New South Wales)
- Commersonia apella C.F.Wilkins (Western Australia) – many-flowered commersonia
- Commersonia bartramia (L.) Merr. (Southeast Asia, eastern Australia) – brown kurrajong
- Commersonia borealis (E.Pritz.) C.F.Wilkins & Whitlock (Western Australia)
- Commersonia breviseta C.F.Wilkins & L.M.Copel. (eastern Australia)
- Commersonia corniculata (Sm.) K.A.Sheph. & C.F.Wilkins (Western Australia)
- Commersonia corylifolia (Graham) C.F.Wilkins & Whitlock (Western Australia) – hazel-leaved rulingia
- Commersonia craurophylla (F.Muell.) F.Muell. (Western Australia) – brittle leaved rulingia
- Commersonia dasyphylla Andrews (eastern Australia) – kerrawang
- Commersonia densiflora (Turcz.) F.Muell. (Western Australia)
- Commersonia erythrogyna C.F.Wilkins (Western Australia) – Trigwell's rulingia
- Commersonia gilva C.F.Wilkins (Western Australia) – golden commersonia
- Commersonia grandiflora (Endl.) C.F.Wilkins & Whitlock (Western Australia)
- Commersonia hermanniifolia J.Gay ex Kunth (New South Wales) – wrinkled kerrawang
- Commersonia macrostipulata Guymer (Queensland)
- Commersonia madagascariensis (Baker) C.F.Wilkins & Whitlock (Madagascar)
- Commersonia magniflora (F.Muell.) F.Muell. (Northern Territory, South Australia)
- Commersonia novoguinensis (Gilli) Guymer (New Guinea)
- Commersonia obliqua Guymer (Vanuatu)
- Commersonia parviflora (Endl.) F.Muell. (Western Australia) – small flowered rulingia
- Commersonia prostrata (Maiden & Betche) C.F.Wilkins & Whitlock (New South Wales, Victoria) – dwarf kerrawang
- Commersonia rotundifolia (Turcz.) F.Muell. (Western Australia) – round-leaved rulingia
- Commersonia rugosa (Steetz) F.Muell. (New South Wales, Victoria)
- Commersonia salviifolia (Hook. ex Steetz) F.Muell. (Queensland, New South Wales)
- Commersonia tahitensis (Dorr) C.F.Wilkins & Whitlock (Society Islands)
