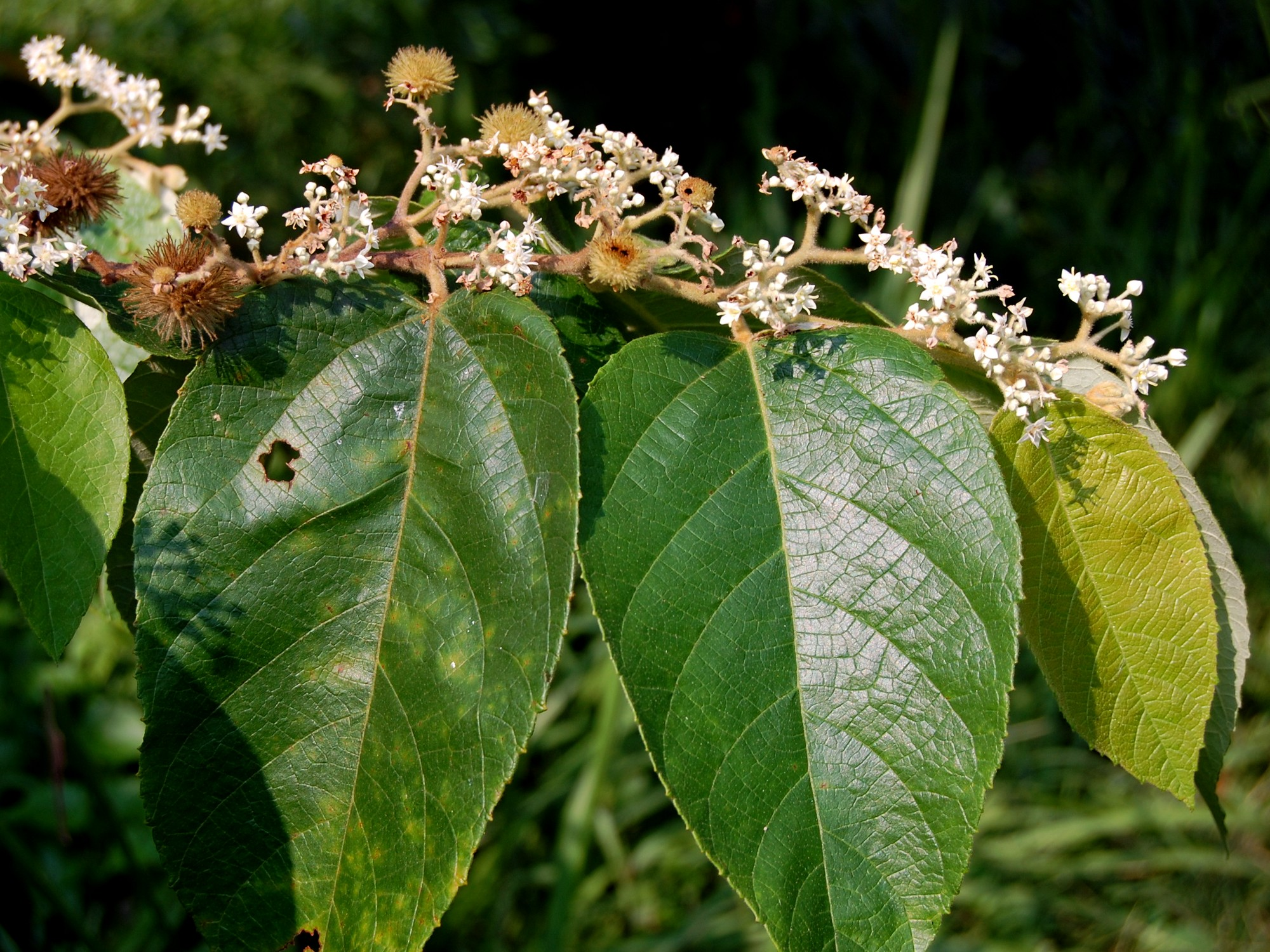
- Commersonia bartramia in West Java

Scientific classification
- Kingdom: Plantae
- Clade: Tracheophytes
- Clade: Angiosperms
- Clade: Eudicots
- Clade: Rosids
- Order: Malvales
- Family: Malvaceae
- Genus: Commersonia
- Species: C. bartramia

Binomial name
- Commersonia bartramia (L.) Merr.

Synonyms
- List: Byttneria caledonica Turcz.; Commerconia echinata F.Muell. orth. var.; Commersonia echinata J.R.Forst. & G.Forst. nom. illeg., nom. superfl.; Commersonia echinata var. bancroftii F.M.Bailey; Commersonia echinata J.R.Forst. & G.Forst. var. echinata; Commersonia echinata var. javana Miq. ex Gagnep.; Commersonia echinata var. platyphylla (Andrews) Gagnep.; Commersonia javensis G.Don; Commersonia platyphylla Andrews; Commersonia platyphylla β lechenaultii DC.; Muntingia bartramia L.; Restiaria alba Rumph.; Restiaria echinata (J.R.Forst. & G.Forst.) Kuntze

= Commersonia bartramia =

Brown kurrajong

Species of flowering plant

Commersonia bartramia, commonly known as brown kurrajong, is a species of flowering plant in the family Malvaceae and is native to Southeast Asia, the Northern Territory, Queensland and New South Wales. It is a tree or shrub with heart-shaped to egg-shaped leaves much paler on the lower surface, and sometimes with fine, irregular teeth on the edges.

== Description ==
Commersonia bartramia is a shrub or tree that typically grows to a height of up to 25 m (82 ft), the trunk up to 50 cm (20 in) in diameter and sometimes forming buttress roots. The leaves are heart-shaped to egg-shaped or broadly egg-shaped, 50–140 mm (2.0–5.5 in) long and 10–20 mm (0.39–0.79 in) wide on a densely hairy petiole 10–30 mm (0.39–1.18 in) long with stipules 2–6 mm (0.079–0.236 in) long at the base. The tip of the leaf tapers to a fine point, there are sometimes fine, irregular teeth on the lower surface, and the lower surface is much paler than the upper surface. The flowers are arranged in dense heads of 20 to 100 or more 30–100 mm (1.2–3.9 in) long, the groups on a peduncle 5–25 mm (0.20–0.98 in) long, each flower on pedicel 2–7 mm (0.079–0.276 in) long. The sepal are joined at the base with 5 white lobes 1–3 mm (0.039–0.118 in) long, and five white petals with ligules as long as the sepal lobes, and there is a single staminodes between each pair of stamens. Flowering occurs from October to March and the fruit is a hairy, dark capsule 15–25 mm (0.59–0.98 in) long.

== Taxonomy ==
Brown kurrajong was first formally described in 1759 by Carl Linnaeus who gave it the name Muntingia bartramia in Amoenitates Academicae. In 1917, Elmer Drew Merrill changed the name to Commersonia bartramia in his book, An Interpretation of Rumphius's Herbarium Amboinense.

The specific epithet (bartramia) honours the American botanist, John Bartram.

== Distribution and habitat ==
Commersonia bartramia grows in rainforest, and along creeks and gullies near the edges of rainforest. It is a common species in regrowth areas of rainforest and occurs from southern China to as far south as the Bellinger River in New South Wales.
