= Commersonia gilva =

Scientific classification
- Kingdom: Plantae
- Clade: Tracheophytes
- Clade: Angiosperms
- Clade: Eudicots
- Clade: Rosids
- Order: Malvales
- Family: Malvaceae
- Genus: Commersonia
- Species: C. gilva

Binomial name
- Commersonia gilva C.F.Wilkins

Species of flowering plant

Commersonia gilva, commonly known as golden commersonia, is a species of flowering plant in the family Malvaceae and is endemic to the south-west of Western Australia. It is an erect shrub with elliptic to oblong or egg-shaped leaves and yellow flowers.

== Description ==
Commersonia gilva is an erect shrub that typically grows to 0.5–2 m (1 ft 8 in – 6 ft 7 in) high and wide, its new growth covered with golden, star-shaped hairs. The leaves are elliptic to oblong or egg-shaped, the narrower end towards the base, 2–7 mm (0.079–0.276 in) long and 1.0–2.5 mm (0.039–0.098 in) wide on a petiole up to 2 mm (0.079 in) long with egg-shaped stipules about 3 mm (0.12 in) long at the base. The edges of the leaves have irregular serrations, the upper surface is wrinkled and the lower surface is densely covered with golden, star-shaped hairs. The flowers are arranged in groups of 2 to 4 on a peduncle up to 1 mm (0.039 in) long, each flower on a pedicel 1–2 mm (0.039–0.079 in) long with an egg-shaped bract 1–2 mm (0.039–0.079 in) long at the base. The flowers are 5 mm (0.20 in) wide with five yellow, petal-like sepals, five yellow petals with a narrow, white ligule, and a single, yellow staminode between each pair of stamens. Flowering occurs from May to November and the fruit is a woody, elliptic capsule 4–5 mm (0.16–0.20 in) in diameter.

== Taxonomy and naming ==
Commersonia gilva was first formally described in 2011 by Carolyn F. Wilkins and the description was published in Australian Systematic Botany from specimens collected north of West River in 2003. The specific epithet (gilva) means "dull yellow", referring to the flower colour and the hairs on the foliage.

== Distribution and habitat ==
Golden commersonia grows in low mallee and near creeks and drainage lines near Ravensthorpe, Ongerup and Fitzgerald River National Park in the Esperance Plains and Mallee bioregions of south-western Western Australia.

== Conservation status ==
Commersonia gilva is listed as "not threatened", by the Western Australian Government Department of Biodiversity, Conservation and Attractions.
