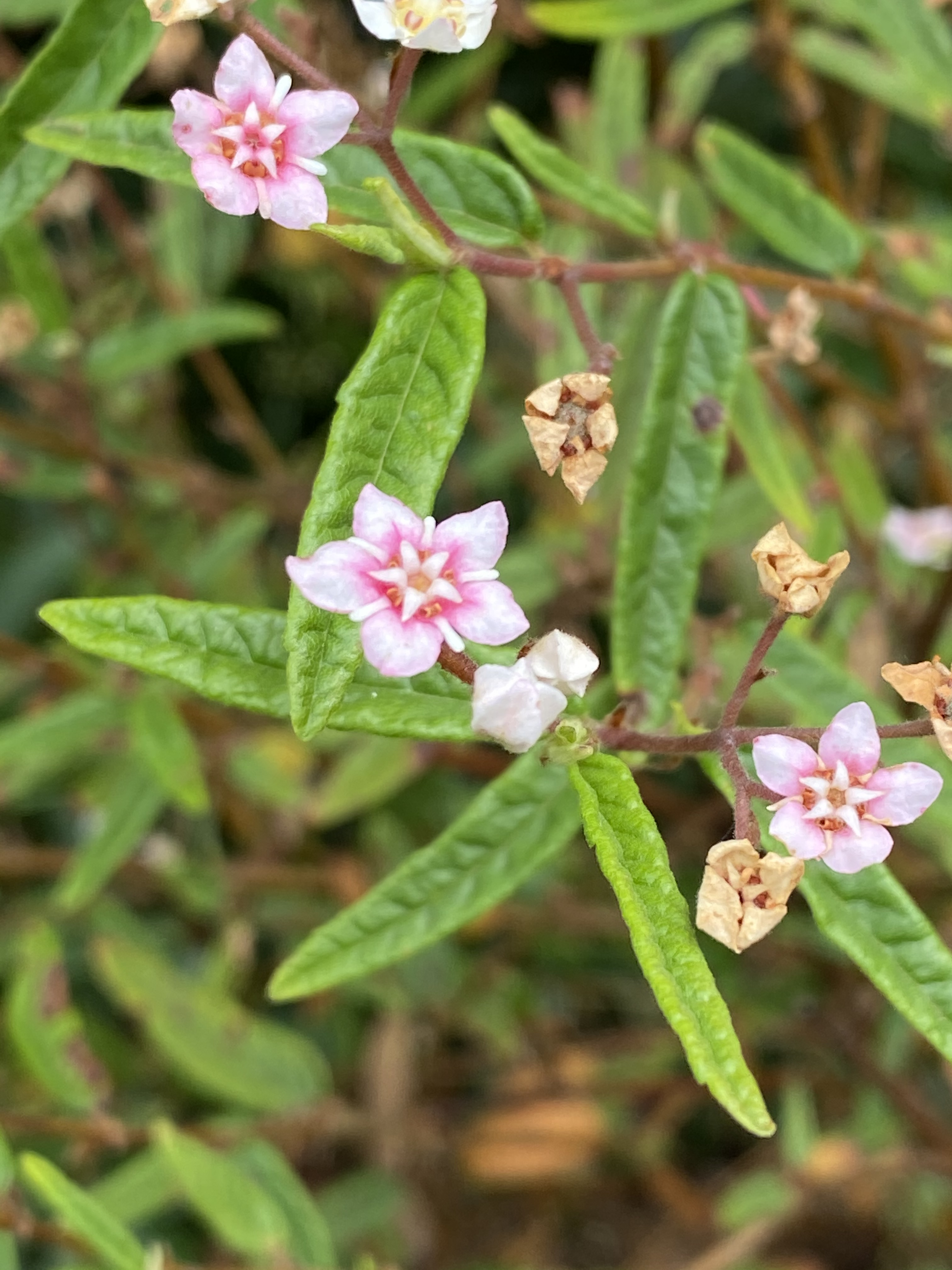
- Cultivated specimen in Bundanoon

Scientific classification
- Kingdom: Plantae
- Clade: Tracheophytes
- Clade: Angiosperms
- Clade: Eudicots
- Clade: Rosids
- Order: Malvales
- Family: Malvaceae
- Genus: Commersonia
- Species: C. amystia

Binomial name
- Commersonia amystia C.F.Wilkins & L.M.Copel.

Synonyms
- List: Rulingia sp. 'Single NP' (L.M.Copeland 2009); Rulingia dasyphylla auct. non (Andrews) Sweet; Rulingia dasyphylla auct. non (Andrews) Sweet; Rulingia hermanniifolia auct. non (Gay ex Kunth) Endl.; Rulingia hermanniifolia auct. non (Gay ex Kunth) Endl.; Rulingia salviifolia auct. non (Hook. ex Steetz) Benth.

= Commersonia amystia =

Species of flowering plant

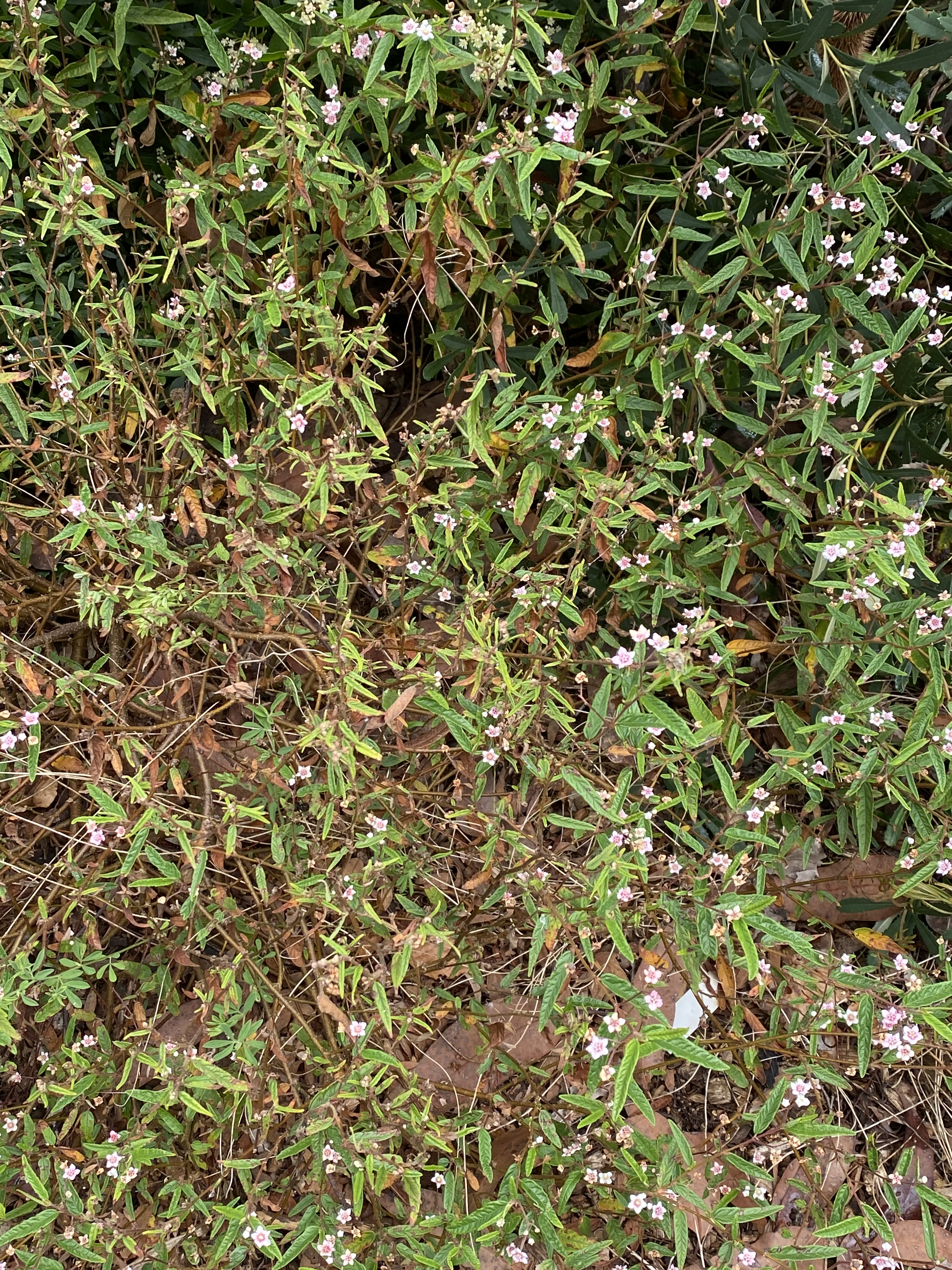
Habit

Commersonia amystia is a species of flowering plant in the family Malvaceae and endemic to eastern Australia. It is a dwarf shrub with narrow egg-shaped leaves that are densely covered with star-like hairs on the lower surface, and has flowers with five white sepals that turn pink as they age, and five smaller white petals.

== Description ==
Commersonia amystia is a dwarf, prostrate to low-lying shrub that typically grows to a height of 10–30 cm (3.9–11.8 in) and has densely hairy branchlets. Juvenile leaves have three lobes and are up to 53 mm (2.1 in) long and 31 mm (1.2 in) wide with small serrations in the edges. The adult leaves are narrow egg-shaped, 2.5–32 mm (0.098–1.260 in) long and 1.5–9.2 mm (0.059–0.362 in) wide on a petiole 0.8–2.5 mm (0.031–0.098 in) long. They are covered with white star-like hairs, densely so on the lower surface, and have wavy or irregularly-toothed edges. The flowers are usually arranged in groups of two to four, the groups on a hairy peduncle 2.5–18 mm (0.098–0.709 in) long, the individual flowers on hairy pedicels 2–8.5 mm (0.079–0.335 in) long. The flowers have five white, petal-like sepals, sometimes pink at the base, 3.9–5.8 mm (0.15–0.23 in) long, and five white, cup-shaped petals about 2–3 mm (0.079–0.118 in) long and wide, red near the base with a white ligule 1–2 mm (0.039–0.079 in) long on the end. Five white staminodes surround the central stye. Flowering occurs from August to October and the fruit is a capsule 8–10 mm (0.31–0.39 in) long and 11.5–13 mm (0.45–0.51 in) wide, densely-covered with soft white hairs and bristles.

== Taxonomy ==
Commersonia amystia was first formally described in 2008 by Carolyn F. Wilkins and Lachlan Mackenzie Copeland in the journal Telopea from material collected by Copeland near Inverell in 2003. The specific epithet (amystia) means "large cup" and refers to the base of the petals.

== Distribution and habitat ==
This commersonia grows in rock crevices in woodland and is known from populations near Inverell in New South Wales and in the Ballandean-Stanthorpe in Queensland.

== Ecology ==
Commersonia amystia appears to be killed by fire but to germinate abundantly after, then appears to become senescent a few years later.
