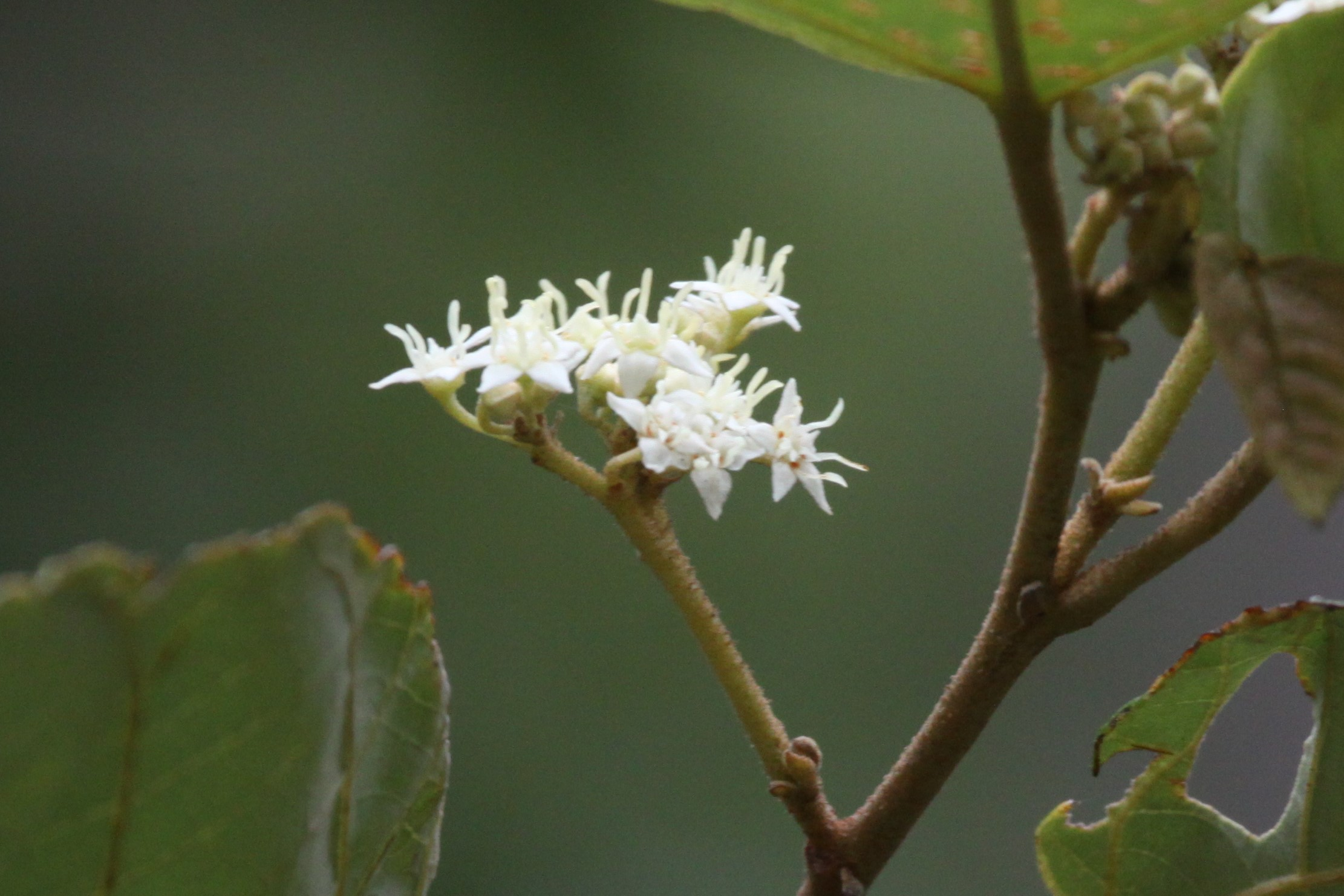
- Near Kuranda

Scientific classification
- Kingdom: Plantae
- Clade: Tracheophytes
- Clade: Angiosperms
- Clade: Eudicots
- Clade: Rosids
- Order: Malvales
- Family: Malvaceae
- Genus: Commersonia
- Species: C. macrostipulata

Binomial name
- Commersonia macrostipulata Guymer

Synonyms
- Commersonia sp. (Kuranda K.Williams 211)

= Commersonia macrostipulata =

Species of flowering plant

Commersonia macrostipulata is a species of flowering plant in the family Malvaceae and is endemic to Queensland. It is a shrub or tree with egg-shaped leaves that are slightly serrated on the edges, flowers with five cream-coloured to white sepals and bristly fruit.

== Description ==
Commersonia macrostipulata is a shrub or tree that typically grows to a height of 2–15 m (6 ft 7 in – 49 ft 3 in), its new growth covered with star-shaped hairs. The leaves are egg-shaped, 40–130 mm (1.6–5.1 in) long and 20–70 mm (0.79–2.76 in) wide on a petiole 8–22 mm (0.31–0.87 in) long with egg-shaped stipules 4–8 mm (0.16–0.31 in) long at the base. The base of the leaf is often heart-shaped, the edges of the leaves are slightly serrated, and the lower surface is covered with velvety hairs. The flowers are and 5–7 mm (0.20–0.28 in) in diameter and arranged in heads of 50 to 200, the groups on a peduncle 5–19 mm (0.20–0.75 in) long, each flower on pedicel 2–7 mm (0.079–0.276 in) long. The petal-like sepals are white and joined at the base. The petals are white with 3 lobes, the middle lobe erect, the ligules densely hairy, and there is a single three-lobed staminode between each pair of stamens. Flowering occurs from August to December and the fruit is a spherical capsule 20–30 mm (0.79–1.18 in) in diameter and densely bristly.

== Taxonomy ==
Commersonia macrostipulata was first formally described in 2006 by Gordon P. Guymer in the journal Austrobaileya from specimens collected from the Rex Range in Mowbray National Park in 2005. The specific epithet (macrostipulata) means "large stipules".

== Distribution and habitat ==
Commersonia macrostipulata grows in, or on the edges of rainforest, at altitudes of up to 800 m (2,600 ft) from Isabella Falls near Cooktown, to near Tully.

== Conservation status ==
This commersonia is listed as of "least concern" under the Queensland Government Nature Conservation Act 1992.
