= Commersonia tahitensis =

Conservation status
- Least Concern (IUCN 3.1)

Scientific classification
- Kingdom: Plantae
- Clade: Embryophytes
- Clade: Tracheophytes
- Clade: Angiosperms
- Clade: Eudicots
- Clade: Rosids
- Order: Malvales
- Family: Malvaceae
- Genus: Commersonia
- Species: C. tahitensis

Binomial name
- Commersonia tahitensis (Dorr) C.F.Wilkins & Whitlock

Synonyms
- Commersonia bartramia var. tahitensis Dorr

Species of flowering plant

Commersonia tahitensis is a species of flowering plant in the family Malvaceae and is endemic to the Society Islands. It was first formally described in 2004 by Laurence Joseph Dorr who gave it the name Commersonia bartramia var. tahitensis in the Flore de la Polynésie française. In 2011, Carolyn Wilkins and Barbara Whitlock raised the variety to species status as C. tahitensis in Australian Systematic Botany.
