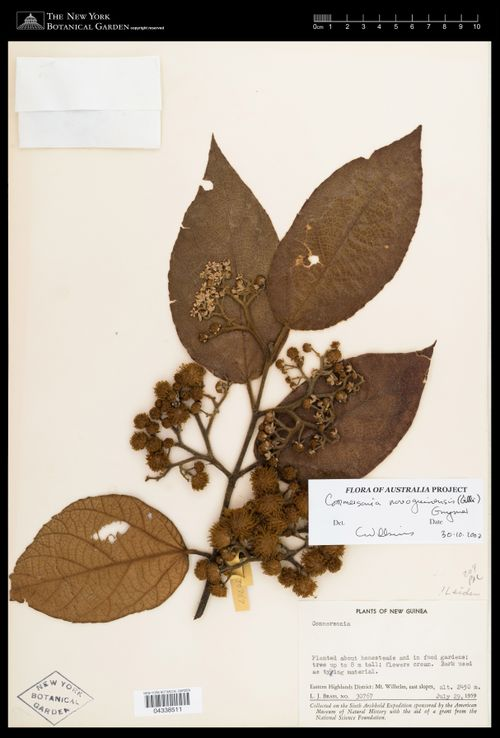
- Holotype in New York Botanical Garden

Scientific classification
- Kingdom: Plantae
- Clade: Tracheophytes
- Clade: Angiosperms
- Clade: Eudicots
- Clade: Rosids
- Order: Malvales
- Family: Malvaceae
- Genus: Commersonia
- Species: C. novoguinensis

Binomial name
- Commersonia novoguinensis (Gilli) Guymer

Synonyms
- Disaster novoguinensis Gilli

= Commersonia novoguinensis =

Species of flowering plant

Commersonia novoguinensis is a species of flowering plant in the family Malvaceae and is endemic to New Guinea. It was first formally described in 1980 by Alexander Gilli who gave it the name Disaster novoguinensis in the Annalen des Naturhistorischen Museums in Wien. In 2005, Gordon P. Guymer transferred the species to the genus Commersonia as C. novoguinensis in the journal Austrobaileya.
