= Commersonia rotundifolia =

Conservation status
- Priority Three — Poorly Known Taxa (DEC)

Scientific classification
- Kingdom: Plantae
- Clade: Tracheophytes
- Clade: Angiosperms
- Clade: Eudicots
- Clade: Rosids
- Order: Malvales
- Family: Malvaceae
- Genus: Commersonia
- Species: C. rotundifolia

Binomial name
- Commersonia rotundifolia (Turcz.) F.Muell.

Synonyms
- Commerconia rotundifolia F.Muell. orth. var.; Restiaria rotundifolia (Turcz.) Kuntze; Rulingia rotundifolia Turcz.

Species of plant

Commersonia rotundifolia, commonly known as round-leaved rulingia, is a species of flowering plant in the family Malvaceae and endemic to the south-west of Western Australia. It is an upright, openly-branched shrub with elliptic to round leaves with wavy edges, and white flowers in clusters of 3 to 10.

== Description ==
Commersonia rotundifolia is an upright, openly-branched shrub that typically grows to 60–100 cm (24–39 in) high and about 60 cm (24 in) wide, its new growth densely covered with white, star-shaped hairs. The leaves are elliptic to more or less round, 1–7 mm (0.039–0.276 in) long and wide on a petiole 1–2 mm (0.039–0.079 in) long with stipules 1–4 mm (0.039–0.157 in) long at the base. The edges of the leaves are wavy, sometimes with rounded teeth, the upper surface with prominent veins, and the lower surface densely covered with whitish, star-shaped hairs. The flowers are arranged in crowded clusters of 3 to 10 on a peduncle 2–10 mm (0.079–0.394 in) long, each flower on a hairy pedicel 2–4 mm (0.079–0.157 in) long with a narrow bract 1–2 mm (0.039–0.079 in) long at the base. The flowers are about 10 mm (0.39 in) wide with five white, petal-like sepals that are hairy on the back, and petals with a narrow, spatula-shaped ligule. Flowering occurs from July to September and the fruit is a hairy, bristly capsule about 2 mm (0.079 in) long.

== Taxonomy ==
This species was first formally described in 1852 by Nikolai Turczaninow who gave it the name Rulingia rotundifolia in the Bulletin de la Société Impériale des Naturalistes de Moscou from specimens collected by James Drummond. In 1882, Ferdinand von Mueller transferred the species to Commersonia as C. rotundifolia in his Systematic Census of Australian Plants.

The specific epithet (rotundifolia) means "round-leaved".

== Distribution and habitat ==
Round-leaved rulingia grows in open mallee scrub, mainly between Gibson Soak north of Esperance, Ongerup, Ravensthorpe and the Fitzgerald River National Park in the Esperance Plains and Mallee bioregions of south-western Western Australia.

== Conservation status ==
Commersonia rotundifolia is listed as "Priority Three" by the Government of Western Australia Department of Biodiversity, Conservation and Attractions, meaning that it is poorly known and known from only a few locations but is not under imminent threat.
