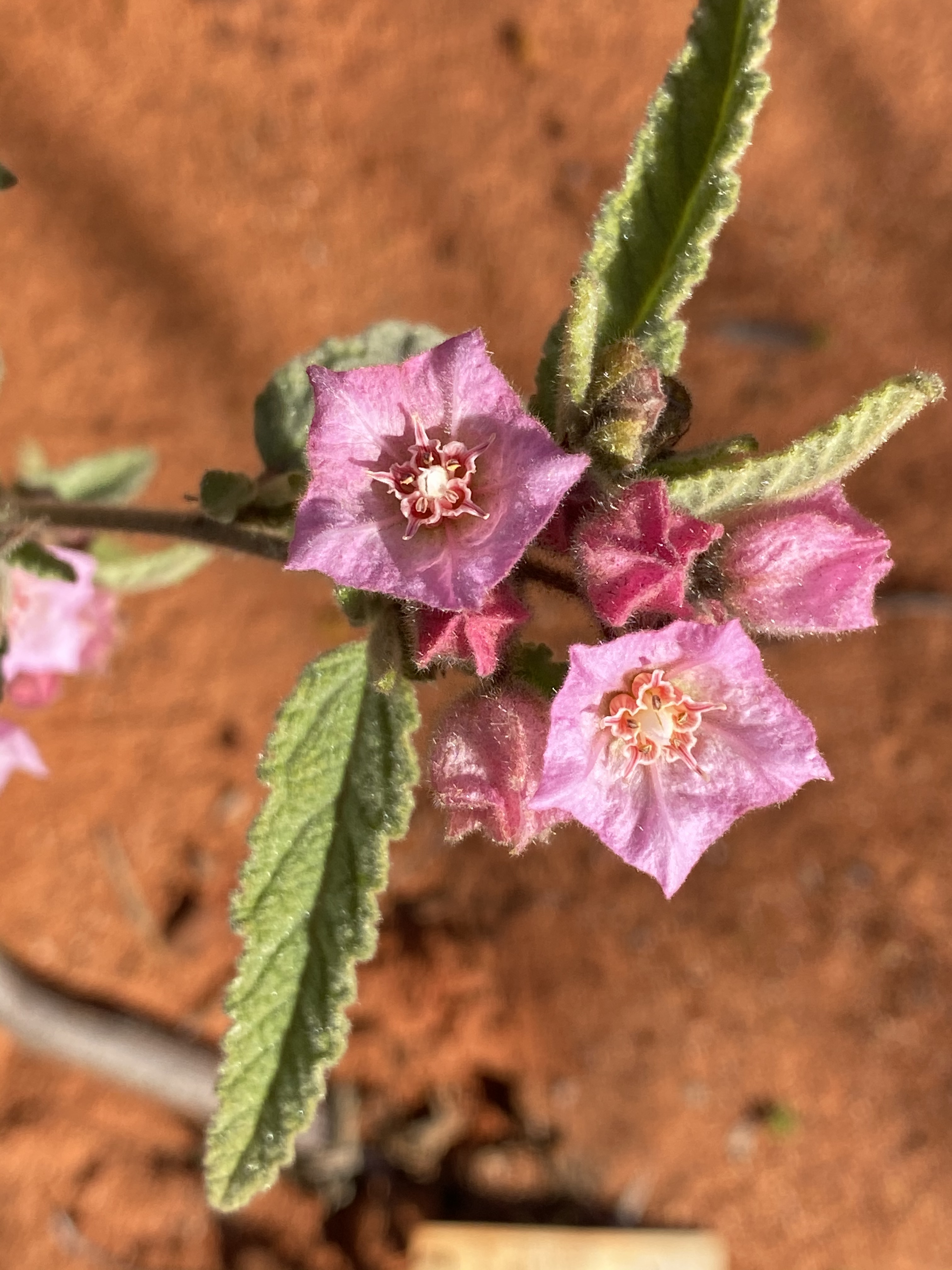
- In the Australian National Botanic Gardens

Scientific classification
- Kingdom: Plantae
- Clade: Tracheophytes
- Clade: Angiosperms
- Clade: Eudicots
- Clade: Rosids
- Order: Malvales
- Family: Malvaceae
- Genus: Commersonia
- Species: C. magniflora

Binomial name
- Commersonia magniflora (F.Muell.) F.Muell.

Synonyms
- Commerconia magniflora F.Muell. orth. var.; Restiaria magniflora (F.Muell.) Kuntze; Ruelingia magniflora J.M.Black orth. var.; Rulingia magniflora F.Muell.

= Commersonia magniflora =

Species of plant

Commersonia magniflora is a species of flowering plant in the family Malvaceae and endemic to Australia. It is an erect shrub with wrinkled, narrowly oblong to elliptic or egg-shaped leaves, and deep pink flowers.

== Description ==
Commersonia magniflora is an erect shrub that typically grows to 1–3 m (3 ft 3 in – 9 ft 10 in) high and wide, its new growth covered with downy hairs. The leaves are narrowly oblong to elliptic or egg-shaped, 10–40 mm (0.39–1.57 in) long and 6–12 mm (0.24–0.47 in) wide on a petiole 1–5 mm (0.039–0.197 in) long with stipules 2–8 mm (0.079–0.315 in) long at the base. The upper surface of the leaves has the veins imprinted, giving it a wrinkled appearance, the edges are serrated and rolled under, and both surfaces are densely covered with star-shaped hairs. The flowers are arranged in groups of 3 to 10 on a peduncle 4–15 mm (0.16–0.59 in) long, each flower on a pedicel 4–12 mm (0.16–0.47 in) long. The flowers are 15–20 mm (0.59–0.79 in) wide with five deep pink, petal-like sepals joined for most of their length, and five cream-coloured petals that are much shorter than the sepals, the ligule narrowly oblong. There is a single, densely hairy staminode between each pair of stamens. Flowering occurs from May to December and the fruit is a hairy, elliptic capsule 8 mm (0.31 in) wide.

== Taxonomy ==
This species was first formally described in 1874 by Ferdinand von Mueller who gave it the name Rulingia magniflora in his Fragmenta Phytographiae Australiae, but in 1881 he transferred it to the genus, Commersonia in a later edition of Fragmenta Phytographiae Australiae. The specific epithet (magniflora) means "large-flowered".

== Distribution and habitat ==
Commersonia magniflora occurs in two disjunct populations. It grows in rocky outcrops, gorges along creeks from Ormiston Gorge and Kings Canyon in the Northern Territory to the north-west corner of South Australia. A second population grows in open woodland and shrubland between Coolgardie and Cunderdin in the Avon Wheatbelt, Coolgardie, Mallee and Murchison bioregions of Western Australia.
