= Commersonia parviflora =

Scientific classification
- Kingdom: Plantae
- Clade: Tracheophytes
- Clade: Angiosperms
- Clade: Eudicots
- Clade: Rosids
- Order: Malvales
- Family: Malvaceae
- Genus: Commersonia
- Species: C. parviflora

Binomial name
- Commersonia parviflora (Endl.) F.Muell.

Synonyms
- List: Commerconia parviflora F.Muell. orth. var.; Commerconia platycalyx F.Muell. orth. var.; Commersonia platycalyx (Benth.) F.Muell.; Lasiopetalum dumosum Steetz nom. inval., pro syn.; Lasiopetalum prostratum Steetz nom. inval., pro syn.; Restiaria parviflora (Endl.) Kuntze; Restiaria platycalyx (Benth.) Kuntze; Ruelingia parviflora Diels & E.Pritz. orth. var.; Rulingia nana Turcz.; Rulingia parviflora Endl.; Rulingia platycalyx Benth.; Rullingia parviflora Endl. orth. var.; Thomasia dumosa Steetz nom. inval., pro syn.; Thomasia prostrata Steetz nom. inval., pro syn.; Rulingia corylifolia auct. non Graham: Steudel, E.G. von in Lehmann, J.G.C. (ed.) (1845)

Species of plant

Commersonia parviflora, commonly known as small flowered rulingia, is a species of flowering plant in the family Malvaceae and is endemic to the south of Western Australia. It is a low, prostrate or dense shrub with wrinkled, egg-shaped leaves with rounded teeth on the edges, and clusters of small, white flowers.

== Description ==
Commersonia parviflora is a low, prostrate or dense shrub that typically grows to 5–10 cm (2.0–3.9 in) high and 10–30 cm (3.9–11.8 in) wide, its new stems hairy. The leaves are egg-shaped and wrinkled, 5–19 mm (0.20–0.75 in) long and 1–9 mm (0.039–0.354 in) wide on a petiole 1–6 mm (0.039–0.236 in) long with stipules 1–4 mm (0.039–0.157 in) long at the base. The edges of the leaves have irregular, rounded lobes with the edges rolled under, the upper surface has prominent veins and the lower surface is densely covered with star-shaped hairs. The flowers are arranged in clusters of 2 to 11 on a peduncle 2–12 mm (0.079–0.472 in) long, each flower on a pedicel 2–5 mm (0.079–0.197 in) long. The flowers are 6–7 mm (0.24–0.28 in) wide with five white, petal-like sepals that are hairy on the back. The petals have a linear ligule half as long as the sepals, and there is a single hairy staminode between each pair of stamens. Flowering occurs from July to November and the fruit is a hairy capsule 4 mm (0.16 in) in diameter.

== Taxonomy ==
This species was first formally described in 1837 by Stephan Endlicher who gave it the name Rulingia parviflora in Enumeratio plantarum quas in Novae Hollandiae ora austro-occidentali ad fluvium Cygnorum et in sinu Regis Georgii collegit Carolus Liber Baro de Hügel from specimens collected from King George Sound by Charles von Hügel. In 1882 Ferdinand von Mueller transferred the species to the genus, Commersonia as C. parviflora.

The specific epithet (parviflora) means "small-flowered".

== Distribution and habitat ==
Commersonia parviflora grows in heath, scrub and woodland between Darkan, Albany and Esperance in the Esperance Plains, Jarrah Forest, Mallee and Warren bioregions of southern Western Australia.
