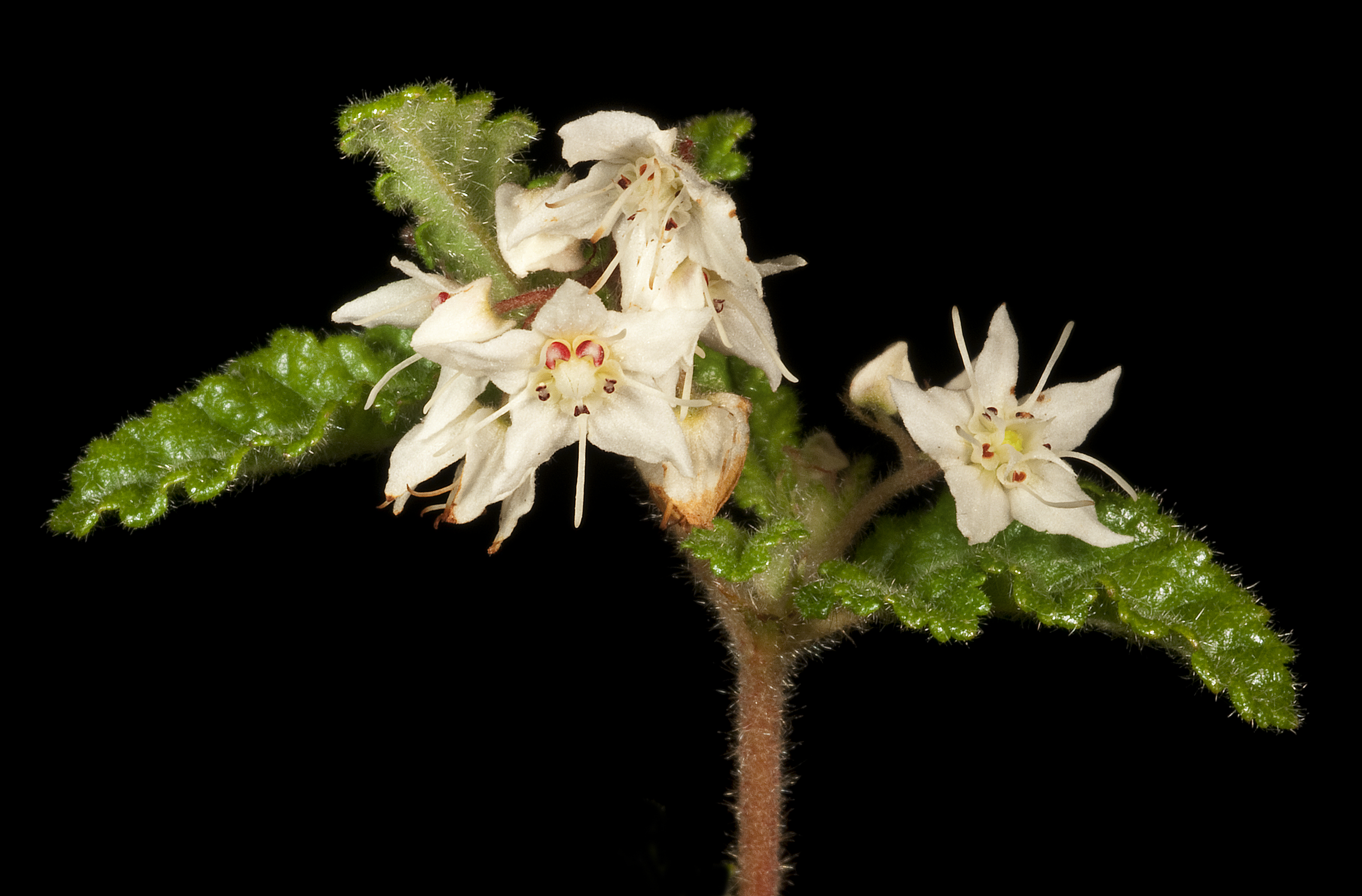

Scientific classification
- Kingdom: Plantae
- Clade: Tracheophytes
- Clade: Angiosperms
- Clade: Eudicots
- Clade: Rosids
- Order: Malvales
- Family: Malvaceae
- Genus: Commersonia
- Species: C. corniculata

Binomial name
- Commersonia corniculata (Sm.) K.A.Sheph. & C.F.Wilkins

Synonyms
- List: Commerconia cygnorum F.Muell. orth. var.; Commersonia cygnorum Steud.; Lasiopetalum corniculatum Sm.; Restiaria cygnorum (Steud.) Kuntze; Ruelingia cygnorum C.A.Gardner orth. var.; Ruelingia malvifolia Diels & E.Pritz. orth. var.; Rulingia cygnorum (Steud.) C.A.Gardner; Rulingia malvaefolia Steetz orth. var.; Rulingia malvifolia Steetz nom. illeg., nom. superfl.

= Commersonia corniculata =

Species of plant

Commersonia corniculata is a species of flowering plant in the family Malvaceae and is endemic to the southwest of Western Australia. It is an erect to prostrate shrub with 3-lobed, egg-shaped leaves, and white to cream-coloured flowers.

== Description ==
Commersonia corniculata is an erect to prostrate shrub that typically grows to 0.3–2 m (1 ft 0 in – 6 ft 7 in) high and 0.4–2 m (1 ft 4 in – 6 ft 7 in) wide and its new growth densely covered with white, star-shaped hairs. The leaves are egg-shaped, 8–20 mm (0.31–0.79 in) long and 4–16 mm (0.16–0.63 in) wide on a petiole 1–5 mm (0.039–0.197 in) long with stipules 1–6 mm (0.039–0.236 in) long at the base. The edges of the leaves have 3 lobes and sometimes a heart-shaped base and are rolled under, the lower surface densely covered with star-shaped hairs. The flowers are arranged in clusters of 5 to 15 up to 30 mm (1.2 in) long on a peduncle 4–14 mm (0.16–0.55 in) long, each flower 5–12 mm (0.20–0.47 in) in diameter on a pedicel 1–6 mm (0.039–0.236 in) long. The flowers have five white to cream-coloured, petal-like sepals, five white petals with a linear ligule about the same length as the sepals, and a single white staminode between each pair of stamens. Flowering occurs from August to December and the fruit is a spherical capsule 12–15 mm (0.47–0.59 in) in diameter.

== Taxonomy ==
Commersonia corniculata was first formally described as Lasiopetalum corniculatum in 1822 by the English botanist James Edward Smith, from material gathered at King George Sound by Archibald Menzies. In 2018, Kelly Anne Shepherd and Carolyn Wilkins examined the material and determined that it matched the later described species, Commersonia cygnorum (described by Ernst Gottlieb von Steudel in 1845). Since Lasiopetalum corniculatum is the first legitimate description of the plant, the name needed to be changed to Commersonia corniculata.

The specific epithet (corniculata) means "corniculate", referring to the tips of the petals.

== Distribution and habitat ==
This species grows in woodland, heath and between granite boulders in near coastal areas south of Perth, from Busselton to Walpole-Nornalup National Park and near Esperance in the Avon Wheatbelt, Esperance Plains, Jarrah Forest, Swan Coastal Plain and Warren bioregions of south-western Western Australia.

== Conservation status ==
Commersonia corniculata is listed as "not threatened" by the Western Australian Government Department of Biodiversity, Conservation and Attractions.
