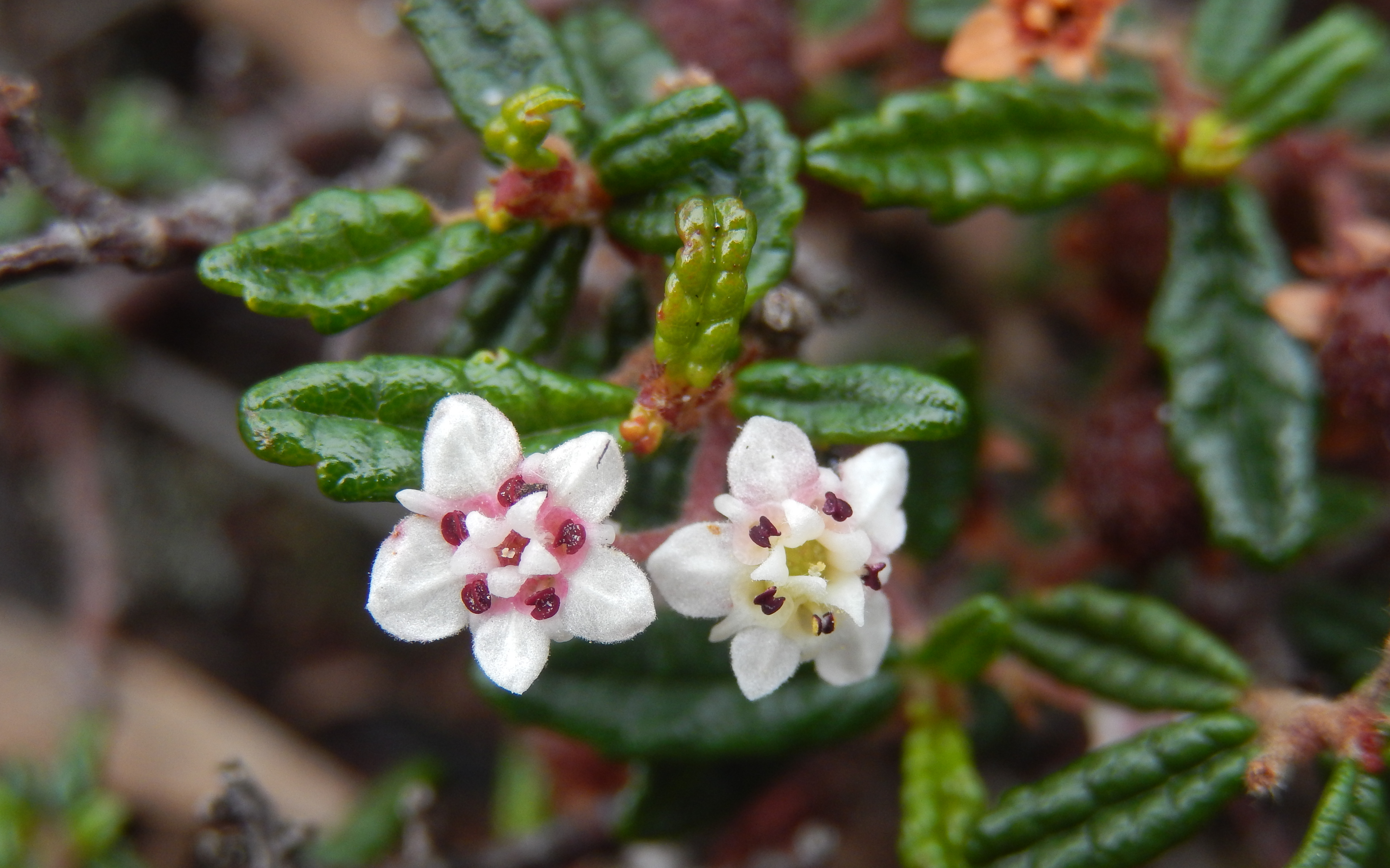

Scientific classification
- Kingdom: Plantae
- Clade: Tracheophytes
- Clade: Angiosperms
- Clade: Eudicots
- Clade: Rosids
- Order: Malvales
- Family: Malvaceae
- Genus: Commersonia
- Species: C. hermanniifolia

Binomial name
- Commersonia hermanniifolia J.Gay ex Kunth

Synonyms
- List: Buettneria hermanniifolia E.M.Ross orth. var.; Buttneria hermanniaefolia J.Gay orth. var.; Byttneria hermanniaefolia DC. orth. var.; Byttneria hermanniifolia (Gay ex Kunth) J.Gay; Commerconia hermanniaefolia F.Muell. orth. var.; Commersonia hermanniaefolia Kunth orth. var.; Lasiopetalum dumosum Lodd., G.Lodd. & W.Lodd.; Restiaria hermanniaefolia Kuntze orth. var.; Restiaria hermanniifolia (J.Gay ex Kunth) Kuntze; Rulingia hermanniaefolia Endl. orth. var.; Rulingia hermanniifolia (Gay ex Kunth) Endl.; Rulingia hermanniifolia (Gay ex Kunth) Steetz isonym; Rulingia oblongifolia Steetz; Rulingia cistifolia auct. non A.Cunn. ex Steetz: Bentham, G.

= Commersonia hermanniifolia =

Wrinkled kerrawang

Species of flowering plant

Commersonia hermanniifolia, commonly known as wrinkled kerrawang, is a species of flowering plant in the family Malvaceae and is endemic to New South Wales. It is a prostrate or trailing shrub with oblong to lance-shaped leaves that are paler on the lower surface, and flowers with five white sepals fading to pink and five pinkish petals.

== Description ==
Commersonia hermanniifolia is a prostrate or trailing shrub with stems up to 1 m (3 ft 3 in) long, that spread across the ground and are often pendent down sandstone rock faces. The adult leaves are oblong to lance-shaped, 5–20 mm (0.20–0.79 in) long and 4–15 mm (0.16–0.59 in) wide on a petiole up to 4.8 mm (0.19 in) long. The leaves have irregular, wavy edges and are wrinkled on the upper surface, paler on the densely hairy lower surface. Juvenile plants and those recovering from fire are sometimes larger than adult leaves and have a petiole 10–30 mm (0.39–1.18 in) long. The flowers have five white, petal-like sepals about 2 mm (0.079 in) long and five inconspicuous white petals that turn pink as they age. The stamens are dark red and there are five white staminodes surrounding the central stye. Flowering occurs in spring and the fruit is a deep red capsule about 4 mm (0.16 in) long in diameter.

== Taxonomy ==
Commersonia hermanniifolia was first formally described in 1823 by Carl Sigismund Kunth in Nova Genera et Species Plantarum from an unpublished description by Jaques Étienne Gay. The specific epithet (hermanniifolia) means "Hermannia-leaved", referring to another genus in the family Malvaceae.

== Distribution and habitat ==
Wrinkled kerrawang is a rare species mostly growing in coastal heath on sandstone cliffs or in gullies between Broken Bay and Jervis Bay and along the Shoalhaven River.
