= Commersonia grandiflora =

Scientific classification
- Kingdom: Plantae
- Clade: Tracheophytes
- Clade: Angiosperms
- Clade: Eudicots
- Clade: Rosids
- Order: Malvales
- Family: Malvaceae
- Genus: Commersonia
- Species: C. grandiflora

Binomial name
- Commersonia grandiflora (Endl.) C.F.Wilkins & Whitlock

Synonyms
- Commerconia cinerea F.Muell. orth. var.; Commersonia cinerea Steud.; Restiaria grandiflora (Endl.) Kuntze; Ruelingia grandiflora Diels & E.Pritz. orth. var.; Rulingia althaeifolia Turcz.; Rulingia grandiflora Endl.; Rullingia grandiflora Endl. orth. var.

Species of flowering plant

Commersonia grandiflora is a species of flowering plant in the family Malvaceae and is endemic to the south of Western Australia. It is an erect, open shrub with hairy, egg-shaped to elliptic leaves, and white or cream-coloured flowers.

== Description ==
Commersonia grandiflora is an erect, open shrub that typically grows to 0.7–3 m (2 ft 4 in – 9 ft 10 in) high and 0.7–1.5 m (2 ft 4 in – 4 ft 11 in) wide, its young stems covered with velvety, star-shaped hairs. The leaves are egg-shaped to elliptic, 12–45 mm (0.47–1.77 in) long and 7–22 mm (0.28–0.87 in) wide on a petiole 2–9 mm (0.079–0.354 in) long with stipules 2–6 mm (0.079–0.236 in) long at the base. The edges of the leaves are serrated and rolled under, both surfaces densely covered with star-shaped hairs. The flowers are arranged in heads of 4 to 20 opposite leaf axils and are 10–12 mm (0.39–0.47 in) in diameter, the groups on a peduncle 2–15 mm (0.079–0.591 in) long, each flower on pedicel 2–7 mm (0.079–0.276 in) long. The flowers have five white or cream-coloured, hairy, petal-like sepals and five hairy white petals with a hairy, narrow ligule about the same length as the sepals. There is a single white staminode between each pair of stamens. Flowering occurs from July to November and the fruit is a spherical capsule 5–7 mm (0.20–0.28 in) in diameter and densely-covered with white, star-shaped hairs and bristles.

== Taxonomy ==
This species was first described in 1837 by Stephan Endlicher who gave it the name Rulingia grandiflora in Enumeratio plantarum quas in Novae Hollandiae ora austro-occidentali ad fluvium Cygnorum et in sinu Regis Georgii collegit Carolus Liber Baro de Hügel from specimens collected from King George Sound. In 2011, Carolyn Wilkins and Barbara Whitlock transferred the species to the genus Commersonia as C. grandiflora in the journal Australian Systematic Botany.

The specific epithet (grandiflorum) means "large-flowered".

== Distribution and habitat ==
This commersonia grows in sheltered woodland and mallee heath mainly between Walpole and the Fitzgerald River National Park, but also near Esperance, in the Esperance Plains, Jarrah Forest, and Warren bioregions of southern Western Australia.

== Conservation status ==
Commersonia grandiflora is listed as "not threatened" by the Government of Western Australia Department of Biodiversity, Conservation and Attractions.
