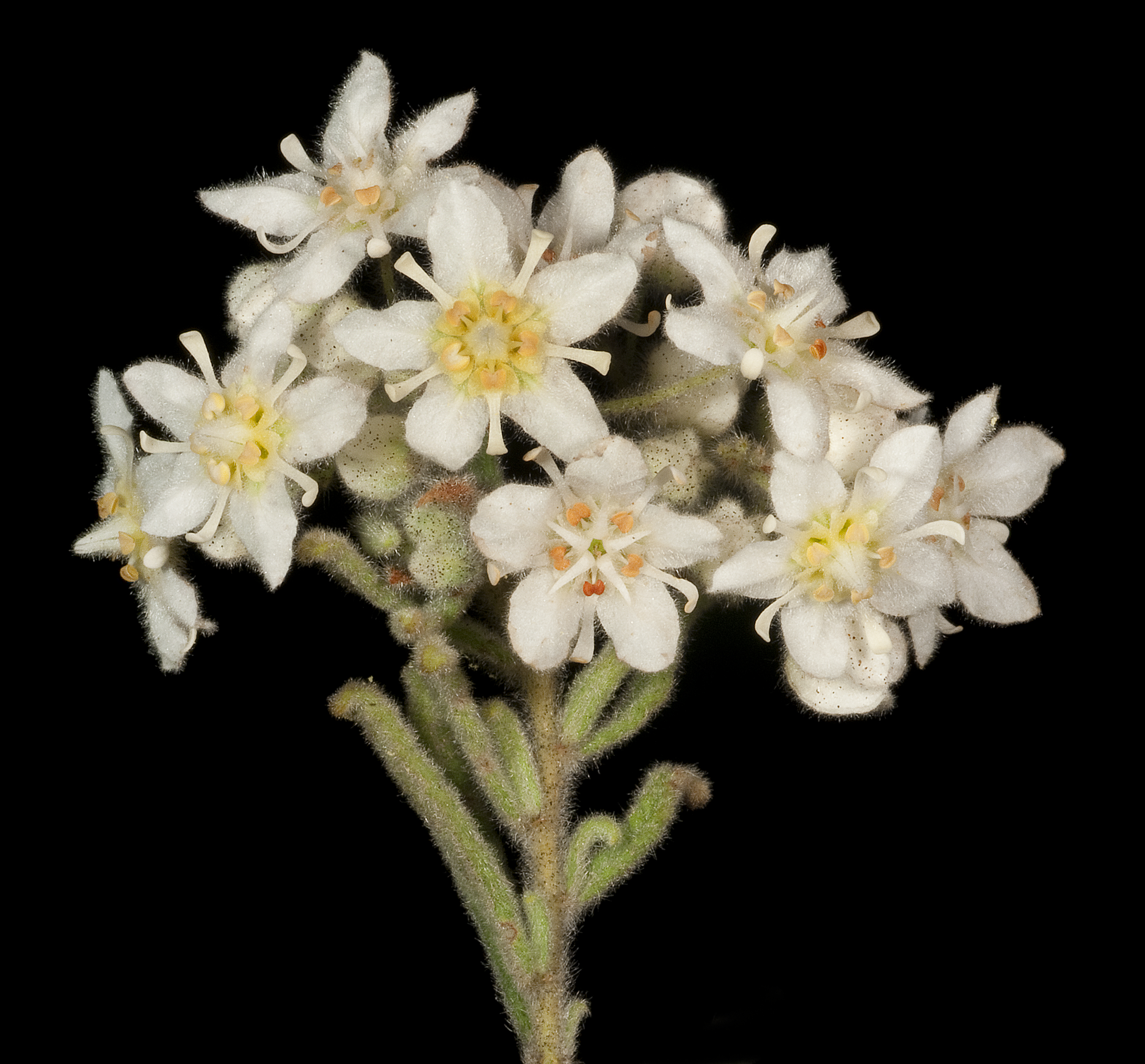

Scientific classification
- Kingdom: Plantae
- Clade: Tracheophytes
- Clade: Angiosperms
- Clade: Eudicots
- Clade: Rosids
- Order: Malvales
- Family: Malvaceae
- Genus: Commersonia
- Species: C. craurophylla

Binomial name
- Commersonia craurophylla (F.Muell.) F.Muell.

Synonyms
- List: Commerconia craurophylla F.Muell. orth. var.; Commersonia craurophylla F.Muell. nom. inval., pro syn.; Restiaria craurophylla (F.Muell.) Kuntze; Ruelingia craurophylla Diels & E.Pritz. orth. var.; Rulingia coacta S.Moore; Rulingia craurophylla F.Muell.; Rulingia tratmanni C.R.P.Andrews orth. var.; Rulingia tratmannii C.R.P.Andrews

= Commersonia craurophylla =

Species of plant

Commersonia craurophylla, commonly known as brittle leaved rulingia, is a species of flowering plant in the family Malvaceae and endemic to southern continental Australia. It is a dense, spreading shrub with crinkled, narrowly oblong to linear leaves, and white to cream-coloured flowers.

== Description ==
Commersonia craurophylla is a dense, spreading shrub that typically grows to 0.5–2 m (1 ft 8 in – 6 ft 7 in) high and 0.5–1.5 m (1 ft 8 in – 4 ft 11 in) wide and has dense, matted, white or rust-coloured, star-shaped hairs on its new growth. The leaves are narrowly oblong to linear, 4–25 mm (0.16–0.98 in) long and 1–5 mm (0.039–0.197 in) wide on a petiole 1–11 mm (0.039–0.433 in) long with stipules 2–5 mm (0.079–0.197 in) long at the base. The upper surface of the leaves has the veins imprinted, the edges are rolled under, and both surfaces are densely covered with star-shaped hairs. The flowers are arranged in dense heads of 8 to 26 on the ends of branches on a peduncle 3–16 mm (0.12–0.63 in) long, each flower on a pedicel 3–7 mm (0.12–0.28 in) long. The flowers are 8–10 mm (0.31–0.39 in) wide with five white to cream-coloured, petal-like sepals and five white petals with a hairy, linear ligule, and a single hairy staminode between each pair of stamens. Flowering occurs from July to November and the fruit is a hairy, spherical capsule 3 mm (0.12 in) in diameter.

== Taxonomy ==
This species was first formally described in 1875 by Ferdinand von Mueller who gave it the name Rulingia craurophylla in his Fragmenta Phytographiae Australiae, but in 1882 he transferred it to the genus, Commersonia.

The specific epithet (craurophylla) means "brittle-leaved".

== Distribution and habitat ==
Commersonia craurophylla grows in mallee woodland and is widespread between Kalgoorlie and Esperance and Coolgardie and Lake Grace in the south-west of Western Australia, and in isolated places in the south-east of South Australia, including on the Eyre Peninsula.
