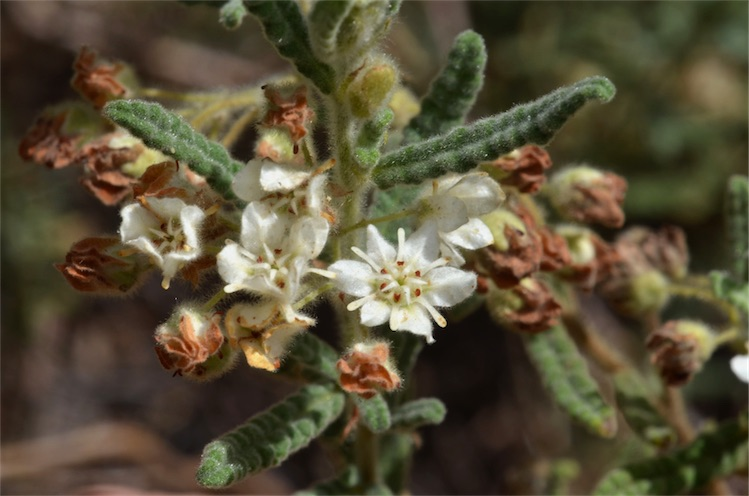
- In the Australian National Botanic Gardens

Scientific classification
- Kingdom: Plantae
- Clade: Tracheophytes
- Clade: Angiosperms
- Clade: Eudicots
- Clade: Rosids
- Order: Malvales
- Family: Malvaceae
- Genus: Commersonia
- Species: C. densiflora

Binomial name
- Commersonia densiflora (Turcz.) F.Muell.

Synonyms
- Achilleopsis densiflora Turcz.; Commerconia densiflora F.Muell. orth. var.; Restiaria densiflora (Turcz.) Kuntze; Ruelingia densiflora Diels & E.Pritz. orth. var.; Rulingia densiflora (Turcz.) Benth.

= Commersonia densiflora =

Species of plant

Commersonia densiflora is a species of flowering plant in the family Malvaceae and endemic to the south-west of Western Australia. It is a dense, low-growing shrub with pinnate, elliptic to narrowly oblong, prominently veined leaves, and white flowers in clusters of 100 or more.

== Description ==
Commersonia densiflora is a dense, low-growing shrub that typically grows to 0.5–1.5 m (1 ft 8 in – 4 ft 11 in) high and 0.5–1 m (1 ft 8 in – 3 ft 3 in) wide, its new growth densely covered with white, star-shaped hairs. The leaves are pinnate, elliptic to narrowly oblong, 15–30 mm (0.59–1.18 in) long and 3–10 mm (0.12–0.39 in) wide on a petiole 3–6 mm (0.12–0.24 in) long with stipules 4–10 mm (0.16–0.39 in) long at the base. The edges of the leaves are rolled under and wavy with irregular teeth, the upper surface has prominent veins, and both surfaces are densely covered with white, star-shaped hairs. The flowers are arranged in dense clusters of 20 to 100 or more on the ends of branches on a peduncle 6–22 mm (0.24–0.87 in) long, each flower on a pedicel 5–20 mm (0.20–0.79 in) long with a bract 2–7 mm (0.079–0.276 in) long at the base. The flowers are 8–15 mm (0.31–0.59 in) wide with five white, petal-like sepals, five pale yellow or white petals with a linear ligule, and a single, densely hairy white staminode between each pair of stamens. Flowering occurs from August to November and the fruit is a hairy capsule 4–5 mm (0.16–0.20 in) in diameter.

== Taxonomy ==
This species was first formally described in 1849 by Nikolai Turczaninow who gave it the name Achilleopsis densiflora in the Bulletin de la Société Impériale des Naturalistes de Moscou from specimens collected by James Drummond. In 1876, Ferdinand von Mueller transferred the species to Commersonia as C. densiflora in his Fragmenta Phytographiae Australiae.

The specific epithet (densiflora) means "crowded-flowered".

== Distribution and habitat ==
Commersonia densiflora grows in shrubland and woodland between Mullewa, Kalbarri and Shark Bay in the drier parts of the Avon Wheatbelt, Geraldton Sandplains, Swan Coastal Plain and Yalgoo bioregions of south-western Western Australia.
