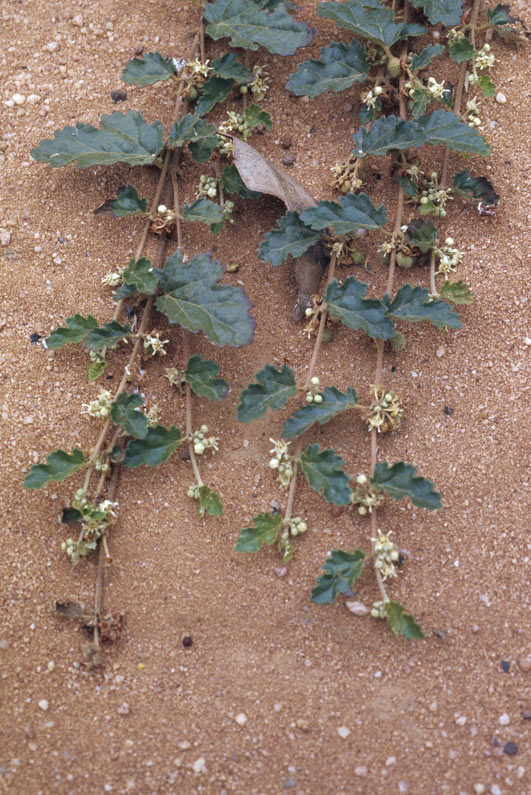
- Near Gilgandra

Conservation status
- Vulnerable (EPBC Act)

Scientific classification
- Kingdom: Plantae
- Clade: Embryophytes
- Clade: Tracheophytes
- Clade: Spermatophytes
- Clade: Angiosperms
- Clade: Eudicots
- Clade: Rosids
- Order: Malvales
- Family: Malvaceae
- Genus: Androcalva
- Species: A. procumbens

Binomial name
- Androcalva procumbens (Maiden & Betche) C.F.Wilkins & Whitlock

Synonyms
- Commersonia procumbens (Maiden & Betche) Guymer; Rulingia procumbens Maiden & Betche

= Androcalva procumbens =

Species of flowering plant

Androcalva procumbens is a species of flowering plant in the family Malvaceae and is endemic to central New South Wales. It is a prostrate shrub covered with star-shaped hairs, and with slender, trailing stems, egg-shaped to narrowly egg-shaped or lance-shaped leaves with scalloped or lobed edges, and clusters of 4 to 10 white, pink and yellow flowers.

== Description ==
Androcalva procumbens is a prostrate shrub with sleder, trailing stems up to 30 cm (12 in) long, its new growth densely covered with star-shaped hairs. The leaves are egg-shaped to narrowly egg-shaped or lance-shaped, 20–50 mm (0.79–1.97 in) long and 15–25 mm (0.59–0.98 in) wide on a petiole 3–12 mm (0.12–0.47 in) long with narrowly triangular stipules 2–4 mm (0.079–0.157 in) long at the base. The edges of the leaves are scalloped, lobed or regularly toothed, the lower surface densely covered with woolly, white hairs. The flowers are arranged in clusters of 4 to 10 on a peduncle 1–4 mm (0.039–0.157 in) long, each flower on a pedicel 2–4 mm (0.079–0.157 in) long, with a narrowly triangular bract 1–3 mm (0.039–0.118 in) long at the base. The flowers are about 6 mm (0.24 in) in diameter with 5 white petal-like sepals with a pink base and about 2 mm (0.079 in) long, and pink petals about 2 mm (0.079 in) long with a yellow base, the ligule white. There are up to 3 egg-shaped staminodes between each pair of stamens. Flowering occurs from August to December and the fruit is a densely hairy capsule 4–5 mm (0.16–0.20 in) long.

== Taxonomy ==
This species was first formally described in 1898 by Joseph Maiden and Ernst Betche who gave it the name Rulingia procumbens in Proceedings of the Linnean Society of New South Wales. In 2011, Carolyn Wilkins and Barbara Whitlock assigned it to the new genus Androcalva in Australian Systematic Botany. The specific epithet (procumbens) means "procumbent".

== Distribution and habitat ==
Androcalva procumbens grows in sandy soil mainly in the Dubbo, Mendooran and Gilgandra districts, but also in the Pilliga and Nymagee districts in central New South Wales.

== Conservation status ==
Androcalva procumbens is listed as "vulnerable" under the Australian Government Environment Protection and Biodiversity Conservation Act 1999.
