= Commersonia borealis =

Scientific classification
- Kingdom: Plantae
- Clade: Tracheophytes
- Clade: Angiosperms
- Clade: Eudicots
- Clade: Rosids
- Order: Malvales
- Family: Malvaceae
- Genus: Commersonia
- Species: C. borealis

Binomial name
- Commersonia borealis (E.Pritz.) C.F.Wilkins & Whitlock
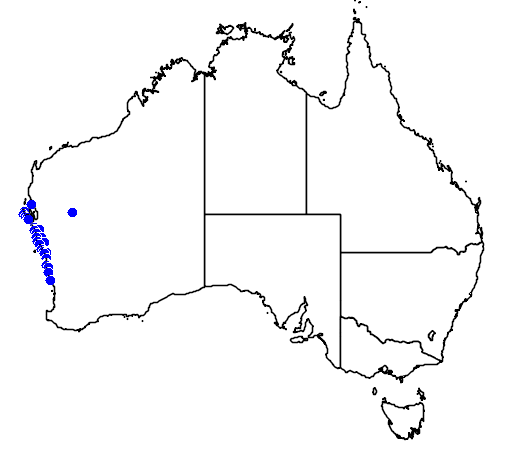
- Map showing distribution of Commersonia borealis in Australia

Synonyms
- Ruelingia malvifolia var. borealis E.Pritz. orth. var.; Rulingia borealis (E.Pritz.) C.F.Wilkins; Rulingia cygnorum var. borealis Blackall & Grieve nom. inval.; Rulingia malvifolia var. borealis E.Pritz.

Species of flowering plant

Commersonia borealis is a species of flowering plant in the family Malvaceae and is endemic to the southwest of Western Australia. It is a low growing, spreading shrub with egg-shaped to oblong leaves, and white, yellow and cream-coloured flowers.

== Description ==
Commersonia borealis is a low growing, spreading shrub that typically grows to 0.3–1.5 m (1 ft 0 in – 4 ft 11 in) high and 0.5–1.5 m (1 ft 8 in – 4 ft 11 in) wide and has scattered star-shaped hairs on its new growth. The leaves are egg-shaped to oblong, 10–40 mm (0.39–1.57 in) long and 7–20 mm (0.28–0.79 in) wide on a petiole 1–5 mm (0.039–0.197 in) long with narrowly lance-shaped stipules up to 6 mm (0.24 in) long at the base. The edges of the leaves have rounded lobes and are rolled under, the lower surface densely covered with white, star-shaped hairs. The flowers are arranged in clusters of 7 to 12 opposite leaf axils and are white to cream-coloured and 6–12 mm (0.24–0.47 in) in diameter, the groups on a hairy peduncle 2–8 mm (0.079–0.315 in) long, each flower on hairy pedicel 2–6 mm (0.079–0.236 in) long. The flowers have five white, petal-like sepals up to 7 mm (0.28 in) long, five egg-shaped, creamy-yellow petals 4–5 mm (0.16–0.20 in) long with a yellowish ligule about the same length as the sepals, and a single white staminode. Flowering occurs from July to November and the fruit is a capsule 5–9 mm (0.20–0.35 in) long and densely-covered with white, star-shaped hairs.

== Taxonomy ==
This species was first described in 1904 by Ernst Georg Pritzel who gave it the name Rulingia malvifolia var. borealis in Botanische Jahrbücher für Systematik, Pflanzengeschichte und Pflanzengeographie. In 2005, Carolyn Wilkins raised the variety to species rank as Rulingia borealis in the journal Nuytsia and in 2011 she and Barbara Ann Whitlock transferred the species to the genus Commersonia, resulting in the name, Commersonia borealis. The specific epithet (borealis) means "northern", referring to the distribution of this species.

== Distribution and habitat ==
Commersonia borealis grows in limy sand or loam over limestone in near-coastal shrubland, open woodland or heath between Shark Bay and Seabird north of Perth and on Dirk Hartog Island in the Geraldton Sandplains, Swan Coastal Plain and Yalgoo bioregions of south-western Western Australia.

== Conservation status ==
Commersonia borealis is listed as "not threatened" by the Government of Western Australia Department of Biodiversity, Conservation and Attractions.
