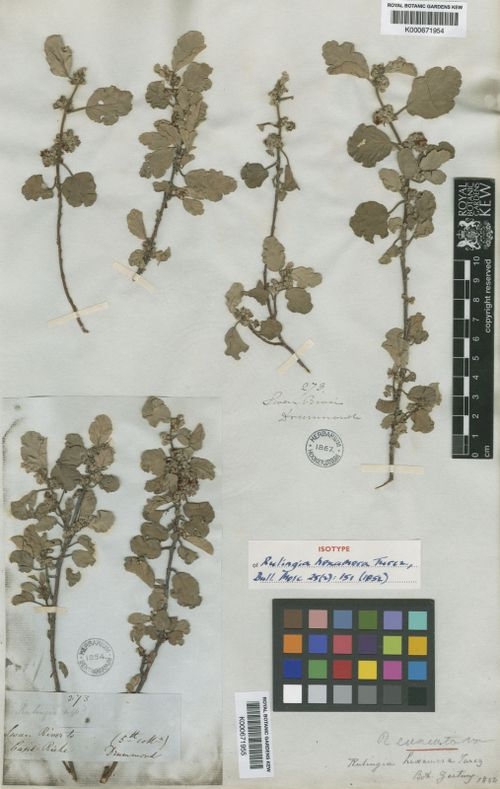
- Isotype in Royal Botanic Gardens, Kew

Scientific classification
- Kingdom: Plantae
- Clade: Embryophytes
- Clade: Tracheophytes
- Clade: Spermatophytes
- Clade: Angiosperms
- Clade: Eudicots
- Clade: Rosids
- Order: Malvales
- Family: Malvaceae
- Genus: Androcalva
- Species: A. cuneata

Binomial name
- Androcalva cuneata (Turcz.) C.F.Wilkins & Whitlock

Synonyms
- Commerconia cuneata F.Muell. orth. var.; Commersonia cuneata F.Muell. nom. inval., nom. nud.; Commersonia cuneata (Turcz.) F.Muell.; Restiaria cuneata (Turcz.) Kuntze; Ruelingia cuneata E.Pritz orth. var.; Rulingia cuneata Turcz.; Rulingia hexamera Turcz.

= Androcalva cuneata =

Species of tree

Androcalva cuneata is a species of flowering plant in the family Malvaceae and is endemic to the south-west of Western Australia. It is a low, spreading, densely hairy shrub that sometimes forms suckers and has wedge-shaped leaves and clusters of 5 to 15 pink flowers.

== Description ==
Androcalva cuneata is a low, spreading, densely hairy, sometimes dense, suckering shrub that typically grows to 2–20 cm (0.79–7.87 in) high and 40–100 mm (1.6–3.9 in) wide. Its leaves are wedge-shaped, 5–20 mm (0.20–0.79 in) long and 4–14 mm (0.16–0.55 in) wide on a petiole 2–10 mm (0.079–0.394 in) long with narrowly egg-shaped stipules 2–6 mm (0.079–0.236 in) long at the base. The leaves are densely covered with white star-shaped hairs, and the edges are wavy or crumpled with irregular indentations. The flowers are arranged in clusters of 5 to 15 in upper leaf axils on a peduncle 1.0–2.5 mm (0.039–0.098 in) long, each flower on a pedicel 1–3 mm (0.039–0.118 in) long, with linear bracts 1–4 mm (0.039–0.157 in) long at the base. The flowers are 5–8 mm (0.20–0.31 in) in diameter with 5 pink, petal-like sepals covered with white, star-shaped hairs, and 5 cup-shaped petals, the ligules shorter than the sepals. There is a single hairy, egg-shaped staminode. Flowering occurs from September to January and the fruit is a rounded capsule about 12 mm (0.47 in) in diameter.

== Taxonomy ==
This species was first formally described in 1852 by Nikolai Turczaninow who gave it the name Rulingia cuneata in the journal, Bulletin de la Société impériale des naturalistes de Moscou from specimens collected by James Drummond. In 2011, Carolyn Wilkins and Barbara Whitlock transferred the species to the genus Androcalva in Australian Systematic Botany. The specific epithet means "wedge-shaped", referring to the leaves.

== Distribution and habitat ==
Androcalva cuneata grows in open woodland between Darkan and the Cape Arid National Park in the Avon Wheatbelt, Esperance Plains, Jarrah Forest and Mallee bioregions of south-western Western Australia.
