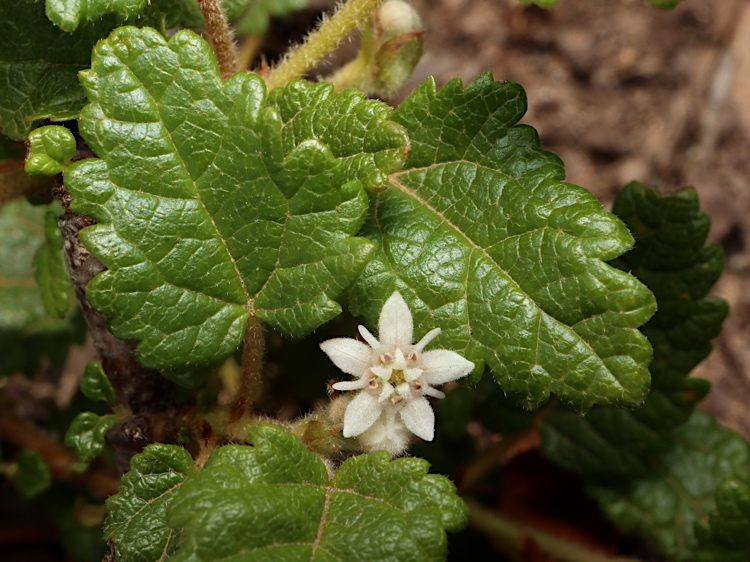
- In the Australian National Botanic Gardens

Conservation status
- Endangered (EPBC Act)

Scientific classification
- Kingdom: Plantae
- Clade: Tracheophytes
- Clade: Angiosperms
- Clade: Eudicots
- Clade: Rosids
- Order: Malvales
- Family: Malvaceae
- Genus: Commersonia
- Species: C. prostrata

Binomial name
- Commersonia prostrata (Maiden & Betche) C.F.Wilkins & Whitlock

Synonyms
- Rulingia prostrata Maiden & Betche

= Commersonia prostrata =

Species of flowering plant

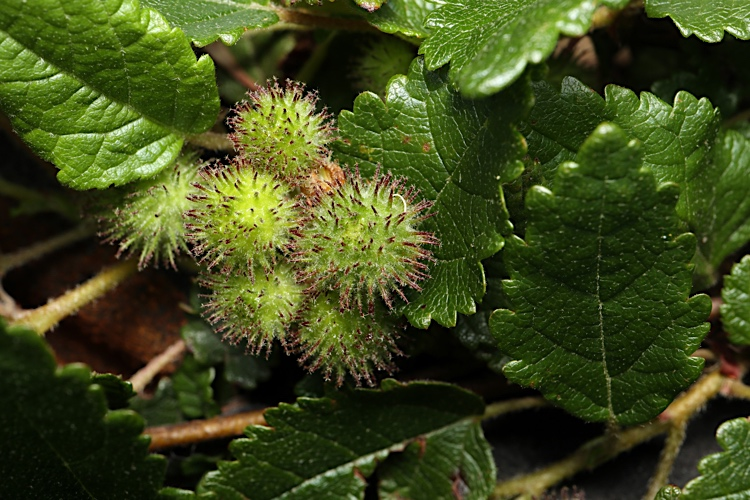
Fruit

Commersonia prostrata, commonly known as dwarf kerrawang, is a species of flowering plant in the family Malvaceae and endemic to eastern continental Australia. It is a prostrate shrub with trailing branches, egg-shaped leaves, the lower surface densely covered with star-like hairs, white, petal-like sepals, and smaller, pinkish petals.

== Description ==
Commersonia prostrata is a prostrate shrub that has branches up to 1 m (3 ft 3 in) or more long, and forms dense mats up to 10 cm (3.9 in) high. The leaves are egg-shaped to heart-shaped, 2–35 mm (0.079–1.378 in) long and 1–32 mm (0.039–1.260 in) wide on a petiole 3–45 mm (0.12–1.77 in) long, with egg-shaped stipules 1–7 mm (0.039–0.276 in) long at the base. The edges of the leaves have irregular, rounded teeth, the upper surface of the leaves is glabrous and the lower surface densely covered with star-shaped hairs. The flowers are arranged opposite leaf axils, usually in groups of 3 to 12, the groups on a peduncle 4–10 mm (0.16–0.39 in) long, each flower on a pedicel 2–5 mm (0.079–0.197 in) long. The flowers are up to 6 mm (0.24 in) in diameter and have five white, petal-like sepals 2.5–3.5 mm (0.098–0.138 in) long and 1.0–1.5 mm (0.039–0.059 in) wide, and five pink and cream-coloured petals with a narrow ligule about half as long as the sepals. There is a white, densely hairy staminode between each pair of stamens. Flowering occurs from September to November and the fruit is a bristly capsule 6–10 mm (0.24–0.39 in) in diameter.

== Taxonomy ==
This species was first formally described in 1898 by Joseph Maiden and Ernst Betche who gave it the name Rulingia prostrata in the Proceedings of the Linnean Society of New South Wales from specimens Maiden collected near Barbers Creek, between Moss Vale and Goulburn in the same year. In 2011, Carolyn Wilkins and Barbara Whitlock transferred the species to the genus Commersonia as C. prostrata in the journal Australian Systematic Botany. The specific epithet (prostrata) means "lying along the ground".

== Distribution and habitat ==
Dwarf kerrawang grows in open woodland and near the edge of forest and is known from populations on the Southern Highlands and Southern Tablelands of New South Wales, the largest population in the Thirlmere Lakes area, and in a few near-coastal areas of south-eastern Victoria.

== Conservation status ==
Commersonia prostrata is listed as "endangered" under the Australian Government Environment Protection and Biodiversity Conservation Act 1999, the New South Wales Government Biodiversity Conservation Act 2016 and the Victorian Government Flora and Fauna Guarantee Act 1988.
