= Commersonia madagascariensis =

Scientific classification
- Kingdom: Plantae
- Clade: Tracheophytes
- Clade: Angiosperms
- Clade: Eudicots
- Clade: Rosids
- Order: Malvales
- Family: Malvaceae
- Genus: Commersonia
- Species: C. madagascariensis

Binomial name
- Commersonia madagascariensis (Baker) C.F.Wilkins & Whitlock

Synonyms
- List: Restiaria madagascariensis (Baker) Kuntze; Rulingia madagascariensis Baker; Rulingia madagascariensis var. typica Hochr.; Rulingia madagascariensis var. andringitrensis Hochr.; Rulingia madagascariensis subsp. andringitrensis (Hochr.) Arènes; Rulingia madagascariensis var. hildebrandtii Baill. ex Arènes; Rulingia madagascariensis var. luteohirta Arènes; Rulingia madagascariensis var. perrieri Arènes

Species of flowering plant

Commersonia madagascariensis is a species of flowering plant in the family Malvaceae and is endemic to Madagascar. It was first formally described in 1883 by John Gilbert Baker who gave it the name Rulingia madagascariensis in The Journal of the Linnean Society. Botany. In 2011, Carolyn Wilkins and Barbara Whitlock transferred the species to the genus Commersonia as C. madagascariensis in the journal Australian Systematic Botany.
