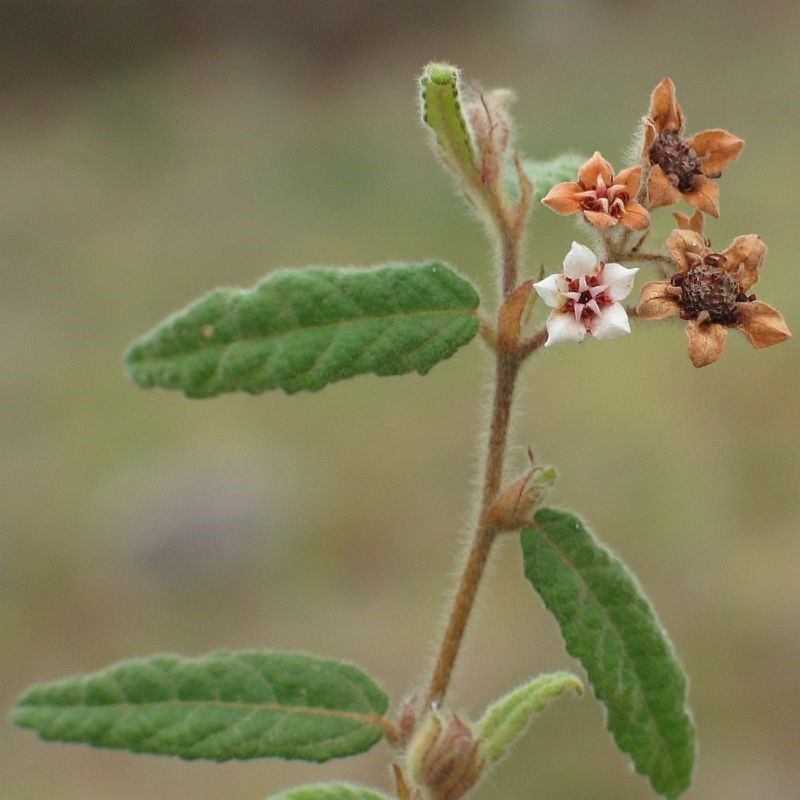
- Near Lochiel

Scientific classification
- Kingdom: Plantae
- Clade: Tracheophytes
- Clade: Angiosperms
- Clade: Eudicots
- Clade: Rosids
- Order: Malvales
- Family: Malvaceae
- Genus: Commersonia
- Species: C. breviseta

Binomial name
- Commersonia breviseta C.F.Wilkins & L.M.Copel.

Synonyms
- List: Rulingia dasyphylla auct. non (Andrews) Sweet: Harden, G.J. in Harden, G.J. (ed.); Rulingia dasyphylla auct. non (Andrews) Sweet: Short, P.S. in Walsh, N.G. & Entwisle, T.J. (ed.); Rulingia hermanniifolia auct. non (Gay ex Kunth) Endl.: Ross, E.M. in Stanley, T.D. & Ross, E.M.; Rulingia hermanniifolia auct. non (Gay ex Kunth) Endl.: Guymer, G.P. in Henderson, R.J.F. (ed.); Rulingia rugosa auct. non Steetz: Harden, G.J. in Harden, G.J.

= Commersonia breviseta =

Species of flowering plant

Commersonia breviseta is a species of flowering plant in the family Malvaceae and endemic to eastern Australia. It is a dwarf shrub with densely-hairy, egg-shaped to narrow elliptic leaves that are paler on the lower surface, and flowers with five white sepals with pink edges, five smaller pale yellow petals and dark red stamens.

== Description ==
Commersonia breviseta is an erect or low-lying shrub that typically grows to a height of 1–3 m (3 ft 3 in – 9 ft 10 in) and has hairy branchlets. Juvenile leaves have three lobes and are 45–110 mm (1.8–4.3 in) long and 20–45 mm (0.79–1.77 in) wide. The adult leaves are narrow elliptic to egg-shaped, 8–24 mm (0.31–0.94 in) long and 1.5–7.5 mm (0.059–0.295 in) wide on a hairy petiole 1–6 mm (0.039–0.236 in) long. The leaves are covered with white, star-like hairs and are paler on the lower surface. The flowers are arranged in groups of two to sixteen 8–35 mm (0.31–1.38 in) long, the groups on a densely hairy peduncle 2.5–6 mm (0.098–0.236 in) long, the individual flowers on densely-hairy pedicels 2–6.5 mm (0.079–0.256 in) long. The flowers have five white, petal-like sepals with a green base and pink edges, 3.5–6.5 mm (0.14–0.26 in) long, and five pale yellow, cup-shaped petals about 2.5–3.5 mm (0.098–0.138 in) long with a white ligule 1.5–2.5 mm (0.059–0.098 in) long on the end and that turns pink as it ages. The stamens are dark red and five white staminodes surround the central stye. Flowering occurs from September to November and the fruit is a brown capsule 2.5–3.5 mm (0.098–0.138 in) long and 4.5–5.5 mm (0.18–0.22 in) wide, densely-covered with soft white hairs and short, brown bristles.

== Taxonomy ==
Commersonia breviseta was first formally described in 2008 by Carolyn F. Wilkins and Lachlan Mackenzie Copeland in the journal Telopea from material collected in Girraween National Park in 2004. The specific epithet (breviseta) means "short bristles" and refers to the bristles on the fruit.

== Distribution and habitat ==
This commersonia grows in rocky places in heath or woodland and occurs from Girraween National Park in far south-eastern Queensland to Genoa in far north-eastern Victoria, and is most common on the tablelands of New South Wales.

== Ecology ==
Commersonia breviseta appears to be killed by fire but to germinate abundantly after, then appears to become senescent after about five years.
