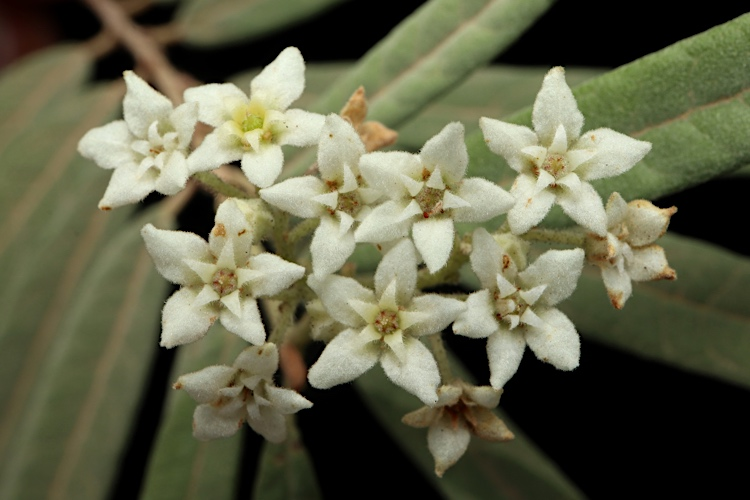
- In the Australian National Botanic Gardens

Scientific classification
- Kingdom: Plantae
- Clade: Tracheophytes
- Clade: Angiosperms
- Clade: Eudicots
- Clade: Rosids
- Order: Malvales
- Family: Malvaceae
- Genus: Commersonia
- Species: C. salviifolia

Binomial name
- Commersonia salviifolia (Hook. ex Steetz) F.Muell.

Synonyms
- Commerconia salvifolia F.Muell. orth. var.; Restiaria salviaefolia Kuntze orth. var.; Restiaria salviifolia (Steetz) Kuntze; Rulingia salvifolia Benth. orth. var.; Rulingia salviifolia (Hook. ex Steetz) Benth.; Thomasia salvifolia Steetz orth. var.; Thomasia salviifolia Hook. ex Steetz

= Commersonia salviifolia =

Species of plant

Commersonia salviifolia is a species of flowering plant in the family Malvaceae and endemic to eastern Australia. It is a shrub with lance-shaped leaves and white flowers in clusters of 5 to 30.

== Description ==
Commersonia salviifolia is a somewhat open shrub that typically grows to 1–4 m (3 ft 3 in – 13 ft 1 in) high and 1–2 m (3 ft 3 in – 6 ft 7 in) wide, its new growth densely covered white hairs. The leaves are lance-shaped, mostly 50–100 mm (2.0–3.9 in) long and 15–30 mm (0.59–1.18 in) wide on a petiole 2–10 mm (0.079–0.394 in) long with triangular stipules 3–10 mm (0.12–0.39 in) long at the base. The edges of the leaves sometimes have irregulr serrations, the upper surface is covered with velvety hairs, and the lower surface is densely covered with white hairs. The flowers are arranged in crowded clusters of 5 to 30 on a peduncle 8–10 mm (0.31–0.39 in) long, each flower on a pedicel 2–7 mm (0.079–0.276 in) long with a bract 2–7 mm (0.079–0.276 in) long at the base. The flowers are about 10 mm (0.39 in) wide with five petal-like sepals that are pink at first, later white, and densely hairy on the back, the petals with a narrow, hairy ligule. Flowering occurs from July to November and the fruit is a spherical capsule 5–9.5 mm (0.20–0.37 in) in diameter and covered with star-shaped hairs and dense bristles.

== Taxonomy ==
This species was first formally described in 1846 by Joachim Steetz who gave it the name Thomasia salviifolia in Lehmann's Plantae Preissianae from an unpublished description by William Jackson Hooker of specimens collected from Moreton Bay. In 1882, Ferdinand von Mueller transferred the species to Commersonia as C. salviifolia in his Systematic Census of Australian Plants.

The specific epithet (salviifolia) refers to the Salvia-like foliage of this species.

== Distribution and habitat ==
Commersonia salviifolia grows on mountain tops, near cliffs or on rock outcrops in open forest, shrubland or heath, usually at higher altitudes from near Buderim in south-eastern Queensland to Mount Warning in far north-eastern New South Wales.
