= Commersonia corylifolia =

Scientific classification
- Kingdom: Plantae
- Clade: Tracheophytes
- Clade: Angiosperms
- Clade: Eudicots
- Clade: Rosids
- Order: Malvales
- Family: Malvaceae
- Genus: Commersonia
- Species: C. corylifolia

Binomial name
- Commersonia corylifolia (Graham) C.F.Wilkins & Whitlock

Synonyms
- Commerconia preissii F.Muell. orth. var.; Commersonia preissii Steud.; Restiaria corylifolia Graham) Kuntze; uelingia corylifolia Diels & E.Pritz. orth. var.; Rulingia corylifolia Sweet nom. inval., nom. nud.; Rulingia corylifolia Graham

Species of flowering plant

Commersonia corylifolia, commonly known as hazel-leaved rulingia, is a species of flowering plant in the family Malvaceae and endemic to the southwest of Western Australia. It is a spreading, erect shrub with egg-shaped to narrowly egg-shaped leaves, and white to cream-coloured flowers.

== Description ==
Commersonia corylifolia is a spreading, erect shrub that typically grows to 1–3 m (3 ft 3 in – 9 ft 10 in) high and 1.0–1.5 m (3 ft 3 in – 4 ft 11 in) wide and has pale star-shaped hairs on its new growth. The leaves are egg-shaped to narrowly egg-shaped, 13–35 mm (0.51–1.38 in) long and 7–18 mm (0.28–0.71 in) wide on a petiole 3–5 mm (0.12–0.20 in) long with triangular stipules up to 3–7 mm (0.12–0.28 in) long at the base. The edges of the leaves have irregular teeth, the upper surface wrinkled and the lower surface densely covered with pale, star-shaped hairs. The flowers are arranged in dense, crowded clusters of 4 to 14 opposite leaf axils on a peduncle 3–11 mm (0.12–0.43 in) long, each flower on a pedicel 2–9 mm (0.079–0.354 in) long. The flowers have five white to cream-coloured, petal-like sepals and five white petals 4–5 mm (0.16–0.20 in) long with a hairy, linear ligule and a single hairy staminode between each pair of stamens. Flowering occurs from November to January and the fruit is a spherical capsule 4 mm (0.16 in) in diameter and densely-covered with white, star-shaped hairs.

== Taxonomy ==
This species was first described in 1832 by Robert Graham who gave it the name Rulingia corylifolia in the Edinburgh New Philosophical Journal. In 2011, Carolyn Wilkins and Barbara Whitlock transferred the species to the genus Commersonia in Australian Systematic Botany. The specific epithet (corylifolia) means "hazel-leaved".

== Distribution and habitat ==
Hazel-leaved rulingia grows in sheltered forest and on roadsides between Augusta and Albany in the Jarrah Forest and Warren bioregions of southern Western Australia.

== Conservation status ==
Commersonia corylifolia is listed as "not threatened" by the Government of Western Australia Department of Biodiversity, Conservation and Attractions.
