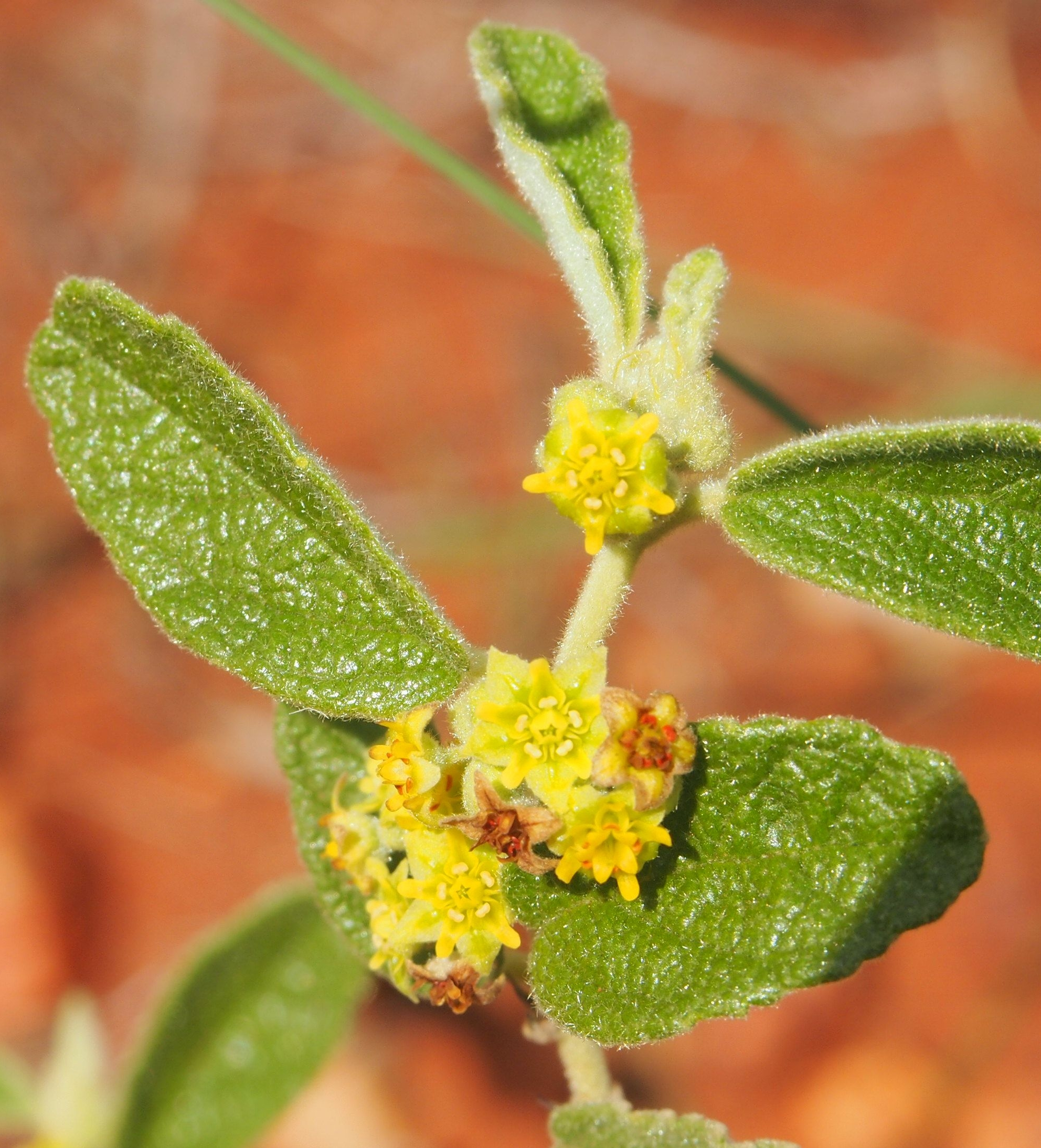

Scientific classification
- Kingdom: Plantae
- Clade: Embryophytes
- Clade: Tracheophytes
- Clade: Spermatophytes
- Clade: Angiosperms
- Clade: Eudicots
- Clade: Rosids
- Order: Malvales
- Family: Malvaceae
- Genus: Androcalva
- Species: A. loxophylla

Binomial name
- Androcalva loxophylla (F.Muell.) C.F.Wilkins & Whitlock

Synonyms
- List: Commerconia kempeana F.Muell. orth. var.; Commerconia laxophylla F.Muell. orth. var.; Commerconia loxophylla F.Muell. orth. var.; Commersonia kempeana F.Muell.; Commersonia laxophylla F.Muell. orth. var.; Commersonia loxophylla (F.Muell.) F.Muell.; Restiaria kempeana (F.Muell.) Kuntze; Restiaria kempiana Kuntze orth. var.; Restiaria laxophylla Kuntze orth. var.; Restiaria loxophylla (F.Muell.) Kuntze; Ruelingia kempeana F.Muell. nom. inval., pro syn.; Rulingia kempeana (F.Muell.) F.Muell. ex J.M.Black; Rulingia loxophylla F.Muell.

= Androcalva loxophylla =

Species of tree

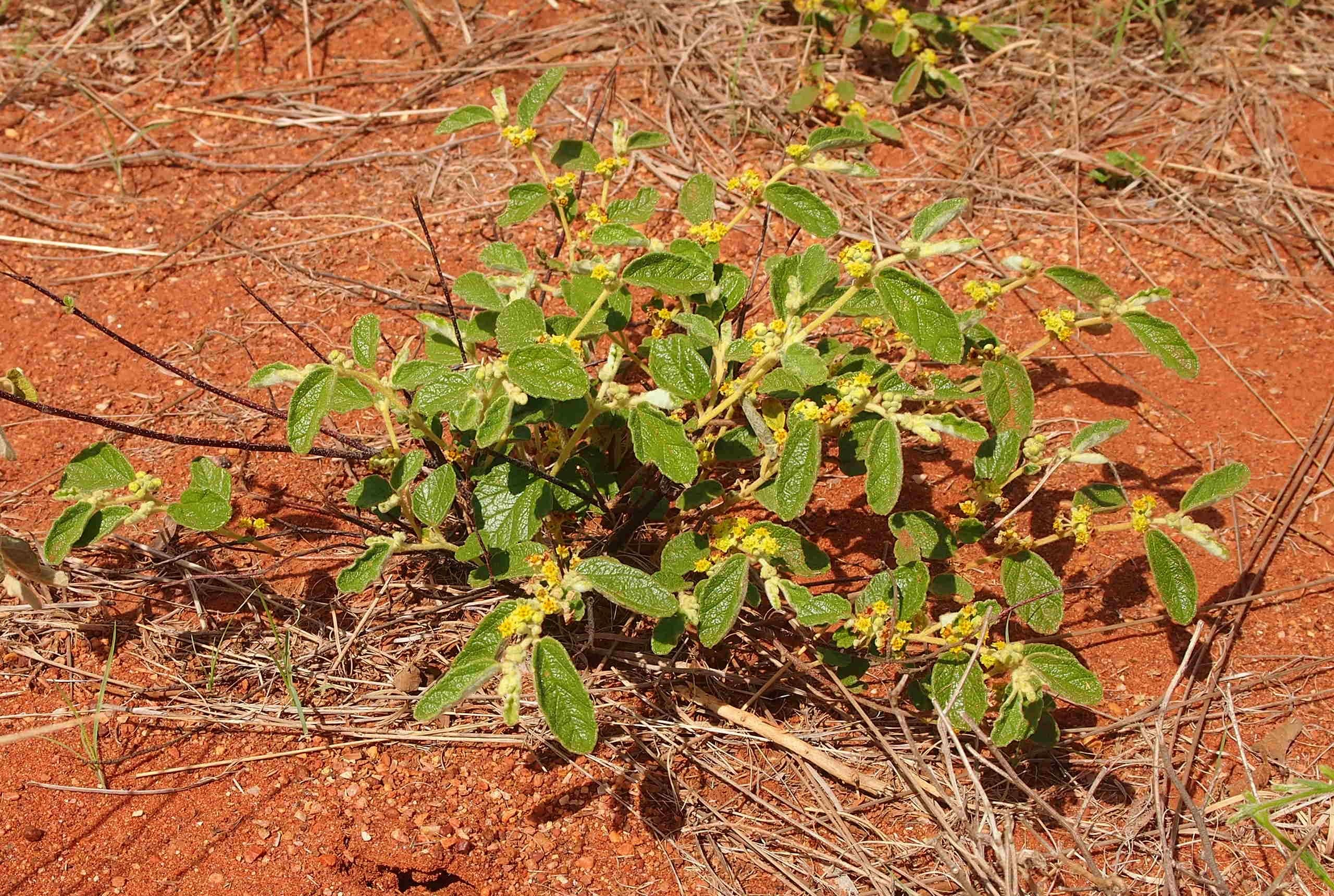
Habit

Androcalva loxophylla is a species of flowering plant in the family Malvaceae and is endemic to northern Australia. It is a shrub with spreading or low-lying branches, oblong to broadly elliptic leaves and clusters of 4 to 20 yellow flowers.

== Description ==
Androcalva loxophylla is a shrub with spreading or low-lying branches and that typically grows to 30–50 cm (12–20 in) high and 60–150 mm (2.4–5.9 in) wide. Its leaves are variably shaped, typically oblong to broadly elliptic, 15–35 mm (0.59–1.38 in) long and 3–20 mm (0.12–0.79 in) wide on a petiole 2–8 mm (0.079–0.315 in) long with narrowly egg-shaped stipules 1–5 mm (0.039–0.197 in) long at the base. The edges of the leaves sometimes have rounded teeth, and both surfaces are covered with fine, star-shaped hairs, more densely so on the lower surface. The flowers are arranged in clusters of 4 to 20 opposite leaf axils on a peduncle 1–2 mm (0.039–0.079 in) long, each flower on a pedicel 1–4 mm (0.039–0.157 in) long, with a thin, brown bract 2–4 mm (0.079–0.157 in) long at first. The flowers are 4–6 mm (0.16–0.24 in) in diameter with 5 yellow, petal-like sepals and 5 yellow petals, the ligules spatula-shaped. There is a usually a single, yellow staminode between the stamens. Flowering occurs in most months with a peak from August to October and the fruit is a hairy, spherical capsule about 3 mm (0.12 in) in diameter.

== Taxonomy ==
This species was first formally described in 1859 by Ferdinand von Mueller who gave it the name Rulingia loxophylla in his Fragmenta Phytographiae Australiae. In 2011, Carolyn Wilkins and Barbara Whitlock transferred the species to the genus Androcalva in Australian Systematic Botany. The specific epithet (loxophylla) means "cross-wise-leaved", referring to the slanting leaf base of this species.

== Distribution and habitat ==
Androcalva loxophylla often grows in dense suckering colonies in sand and is found from Broome in the far north-west of Western Australia, through the Great Victoria, Gibson and Little Sandy Deserts to Innamincka in South Australia and through the Northern Territory to Windorah in western Queensland.
