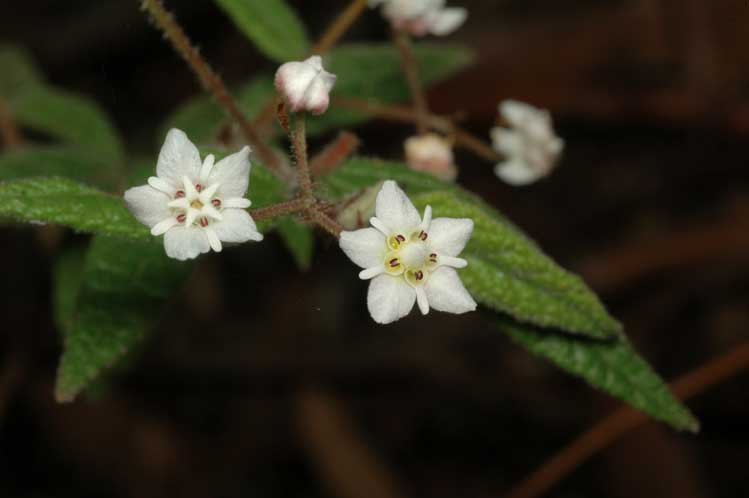
- In the Australian National Botanic Gardens

Scientific classification
- Kingdom: Plantae
- Clade: Tracheophytes
- Clade: Angiosperms
- Clade: Eudicots
- Clade: Rosids
- Order: Malvales
- Family: Malvaceae
- Genus: Commersonia
- Species: C. rugosa

Binomial name
- Commersonia rugosa (Steetz) F.Muell.

Synonyms
- Commerconia rugosa F.Muell. orth. var.; Restiaria rugosa (Steetz) Kuntze; Rulingia cistifolia A.Cunn. ex Steetz; Rulingia cristifolia A.Cunn. ex Benth. orth. var.; Rulingia rugosa Steetz

= Commersonia rugosa =

Species of plant

Commersonia rugosa is a species of flowering plant in the family Malvaceae and endemic to New South Wales. It is an open, straggly shrub with linear to narrowly egg-shaped leaves with irregular teeth or lobes on the edges, and white flowers in clusters of 3 to 15.

== Description ==
Commersonia rugosa is an open, straggly shrub that typically grows to 2 m (6 ft 7 in) high and wide, its new growth covered with brownish, star-shaped hairs. The leaves are linear to narrowly egg-shaped, 2–34 mm (0.079–1.339 in) long and 1–10 mm (0.039–0.394 in) wide on a petiole 1–4 mm (0.039–0.157 in) long with stipules 2–6 mm (0.079–0.236 in) long at the base. The edges of the leaves are irregularly toothed or lobed and rolled under, the upper surface wrinkled with prominent impressed veins, and the lower surface densely covered with velvety hairs. The flowers are arranged in crowded clusters of 3 to 15 on a peduncle 6–18 mm (0.24–0.71 in) long, each flower on a pedicel up to 10 mm (0.39 in) long with a narrow bract 2–5 mm (0.079–0.197 in) long at the base. The flowers are about 10 mm (0.39 in) wide with five white, petal-like sepals that have fine, white star-shaped hairs on the back, and petals with a narrow, hairy ligule. Flowering occurs from August to November and the fruit is a hairy, bristly capsule 8–12 mm (0.31–0.47 in) in diameter.

== Taxonomy ==
This species was first formally described in 1846 by Joachim Steetz who gave it the name Rulingia rugosa in Lehmann's Plantae Preissianae. In 1882, Ferdinand von Mueller transferred the species to Commersonia as C. rugosa in his Systematic Census of Australian Plants.

The specific epithet (rugosa) means "wrinkled".

== Distribution and habitat ==
Commersonia rugosa mainly grows near creeks in forest or woodland, sometimes on hillsides or the summit of ranges and occurs south of the Royal National Park in New South Wales, to Orbost in Victoria, where it was first recorded in 2020 following bushfires.
