= Maxwellia lepidota =

Scientific classification
- Kingdom: Plantae
- Clade: Tracheophytes
- Clade: Angiosperms
- Clade: Eudicots
- Clade: Rosids
- Order: Malvales
- Family: Malvaceae
- Tribe: Lasiopetaleae
- Genus: Maxwellia; Baill.
- Species: M. lepidota

Binomial name
- Maxwellia lepidota Baill.

Species of shrub

Maxwellia lepidota is a species of shrubs or trees in the family Malvaceae. It is endemic to New Caledonia and the only species of the monotypic genus Maxwellia. Its closest relatives are all Australian genera in tribe Lasiopetaleae: Guichenotia, Hannafordia, Lysiosepalum, Lasiopetalum and Thomasia.

The genus name of Maxwellia is in honour of Maxwell T. Masters (1833–1907), an English botanist and taxonomist. The Latin specific epithet of lepidota refers to the Greek word lepidotus meaning scaly. Both genus and species were first described and published in Adansonia Vol.10 on page 100 in 1871.
