= Lasiopetaleae =

Scientific classification
- Kingdom: Plantae
- Clade: Tracheophytes
- Clade: Angiosperms
- Clade: Eudicots
- Clade: Rosids
- Order: Malvales
- Family: Malvaceae
- Subfamily: Byttnerioideae
- Tribe: Lasiopetaleae

Genera
- Commersonia; Guichenotia; Hannafordia; Keraudrenia; Lasiopetalum; Lysiosepalum; Maxwellia; Rulingia; Seringia; Thomasia

Tribe of flowering plants

Lasiopetaleae is a tribe of the subfamily Byttnerioideae of the flowering plant family Malvaceae.

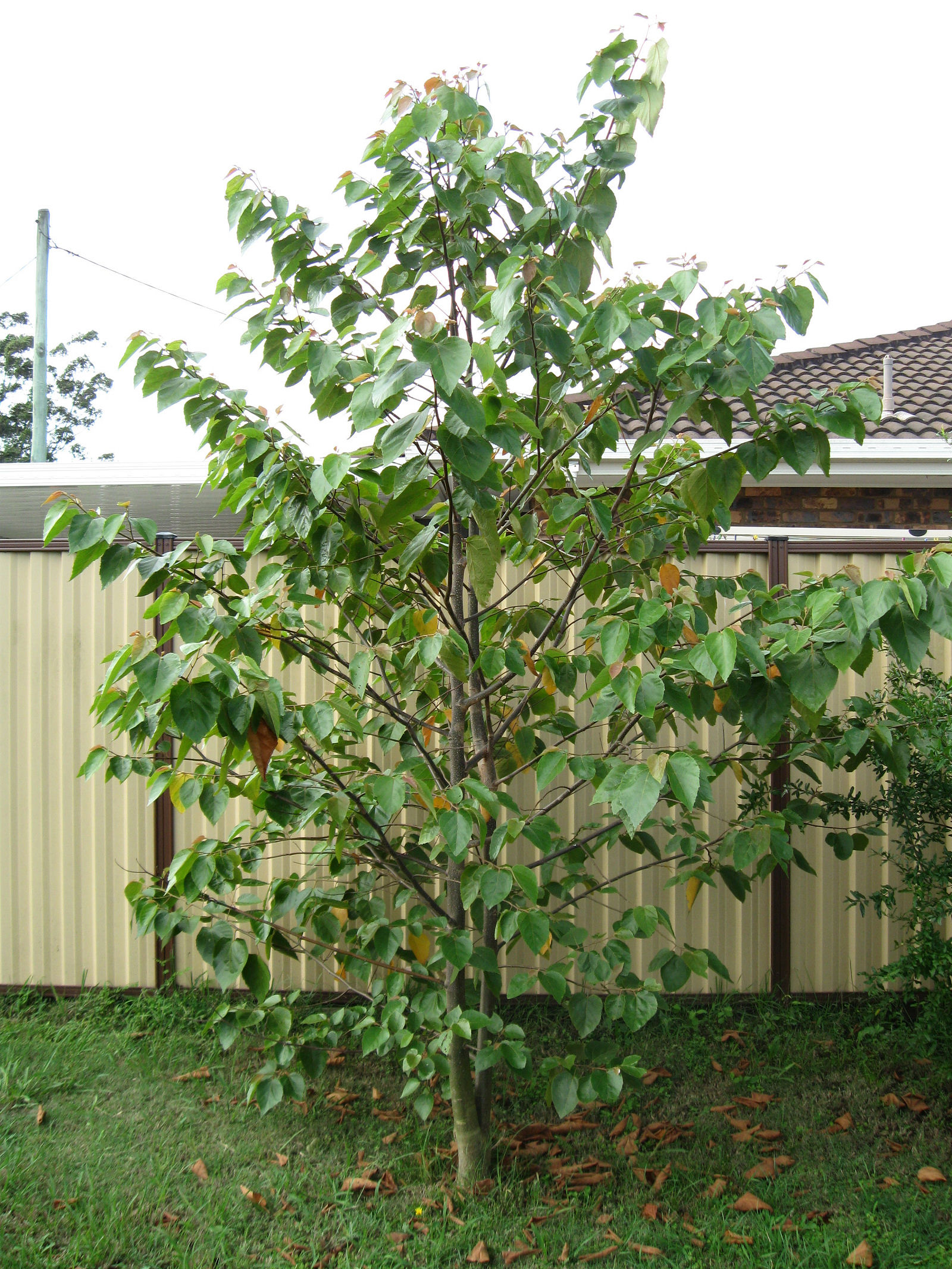
Commersonia bartramia

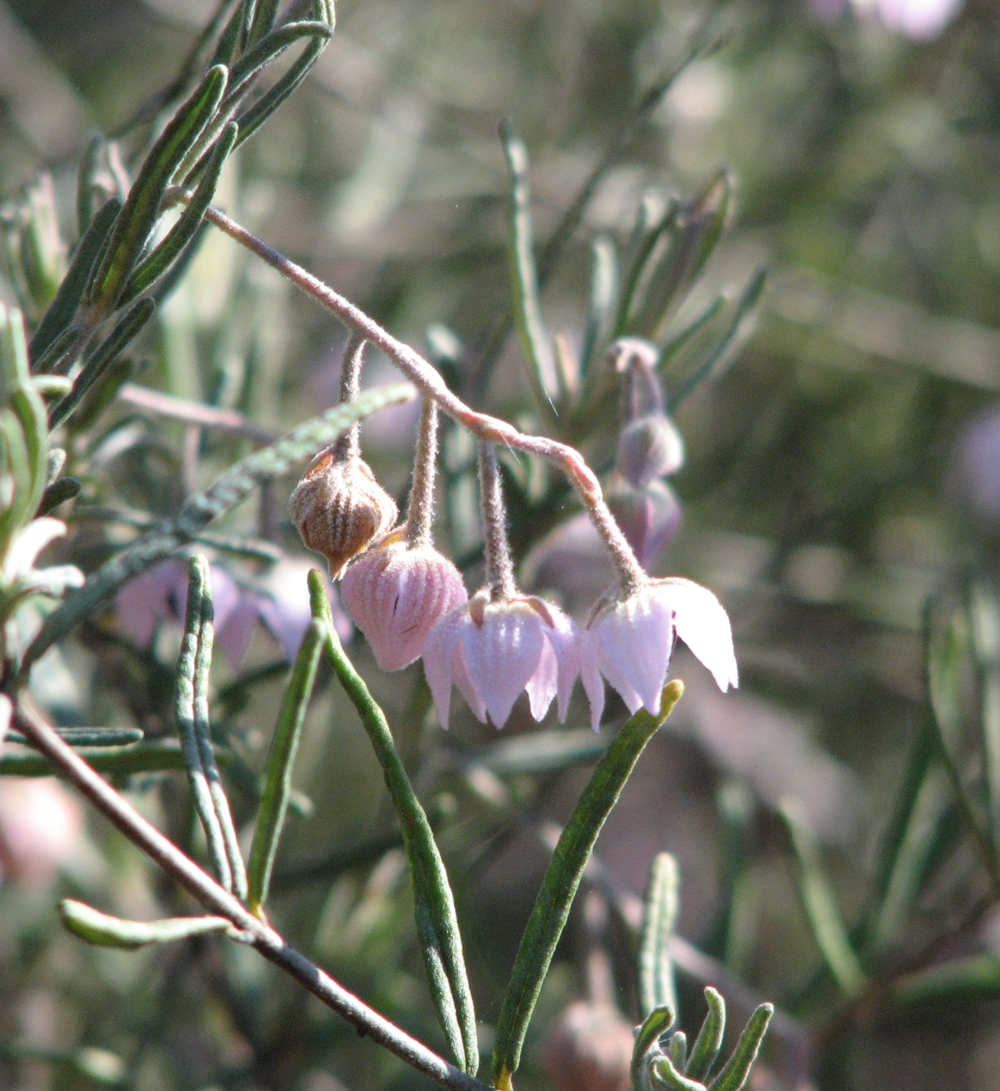
Guichenotia ledifolia

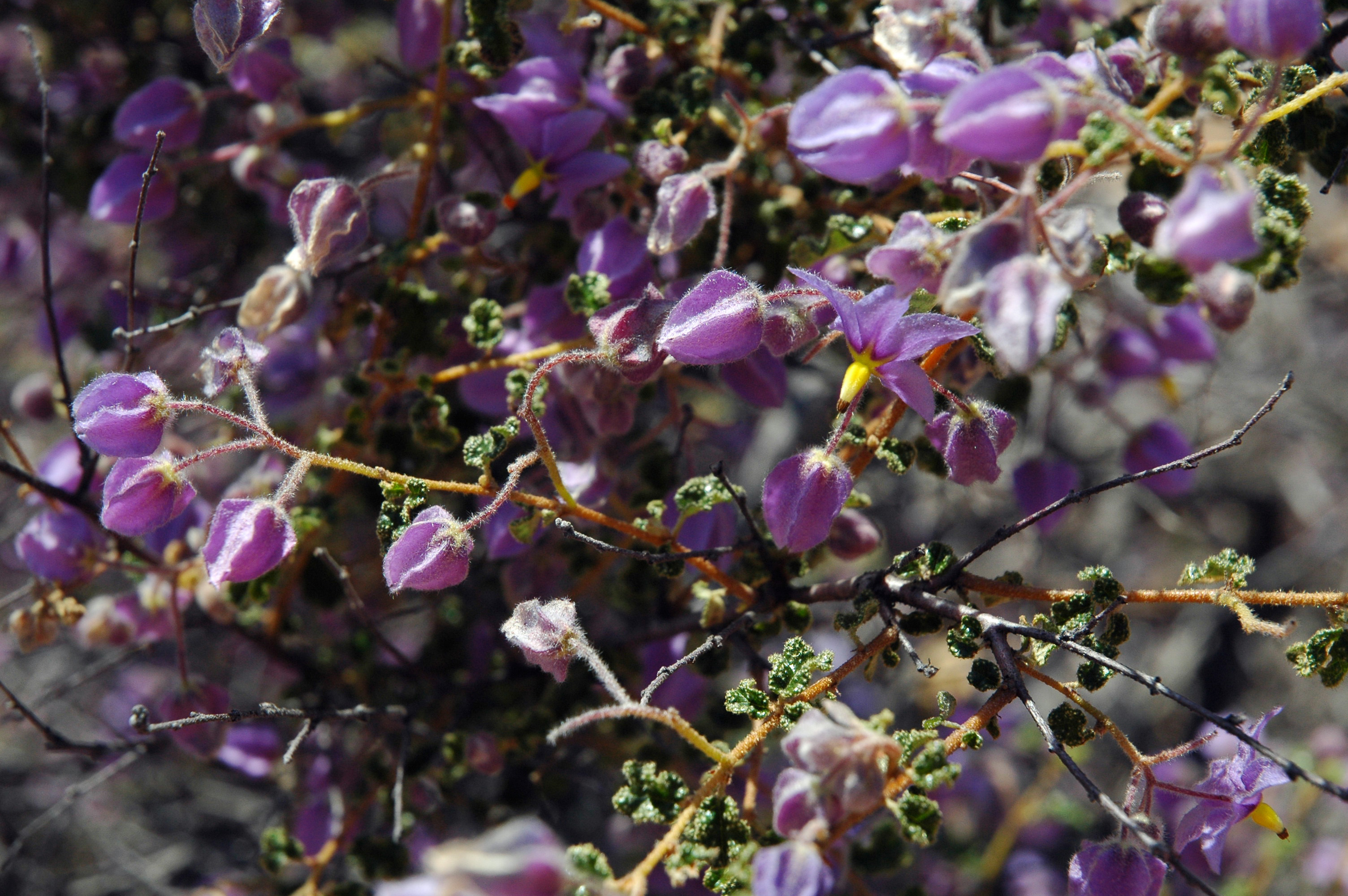
Keraudrenia hermanniifolia

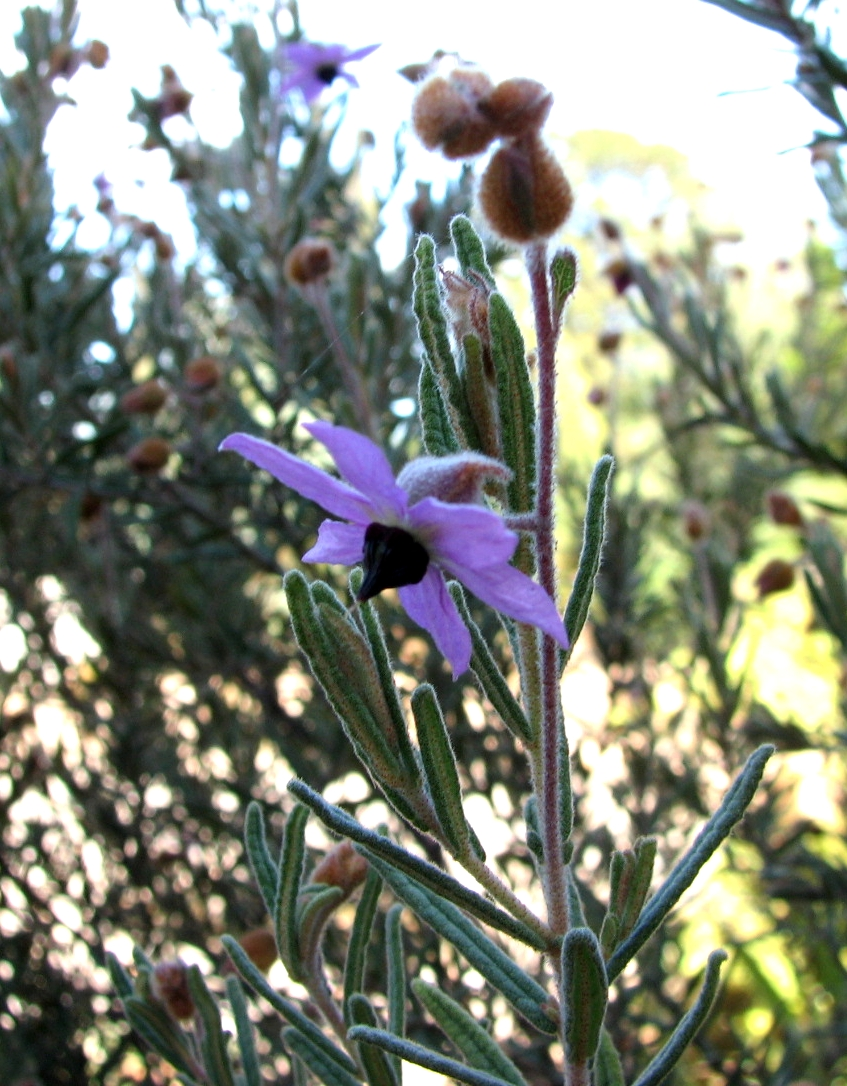
Lysiosepalum involucratum

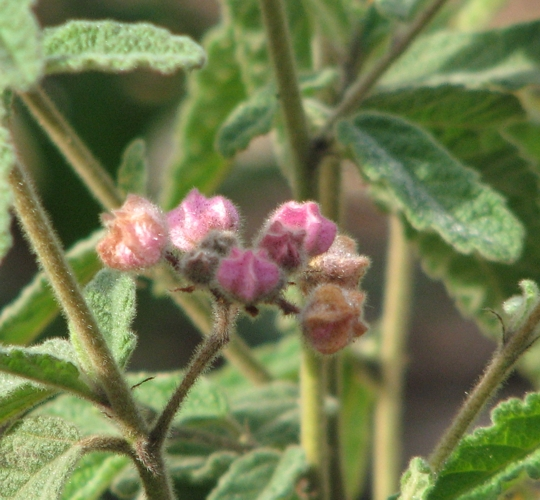
Rulingia magniflora

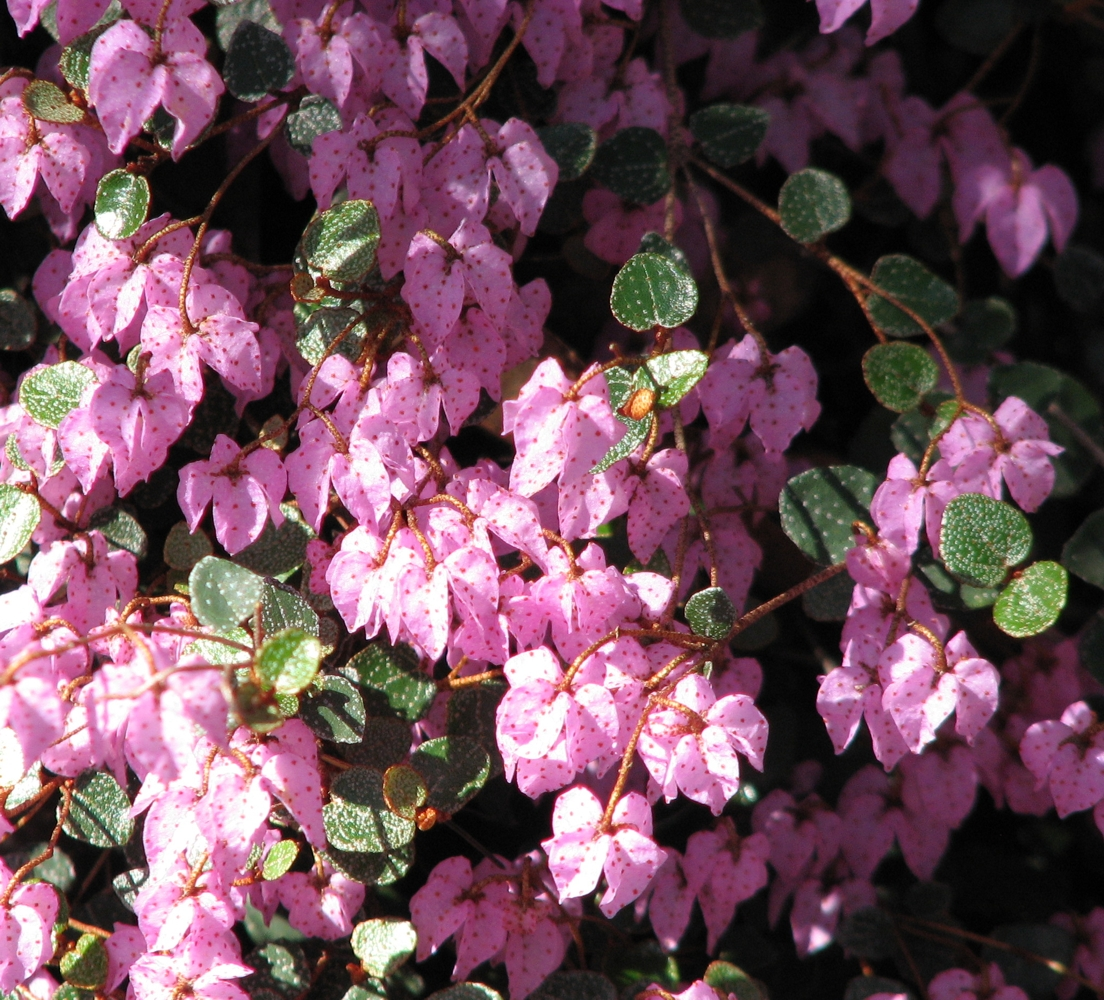
Thomasia pygmaea
