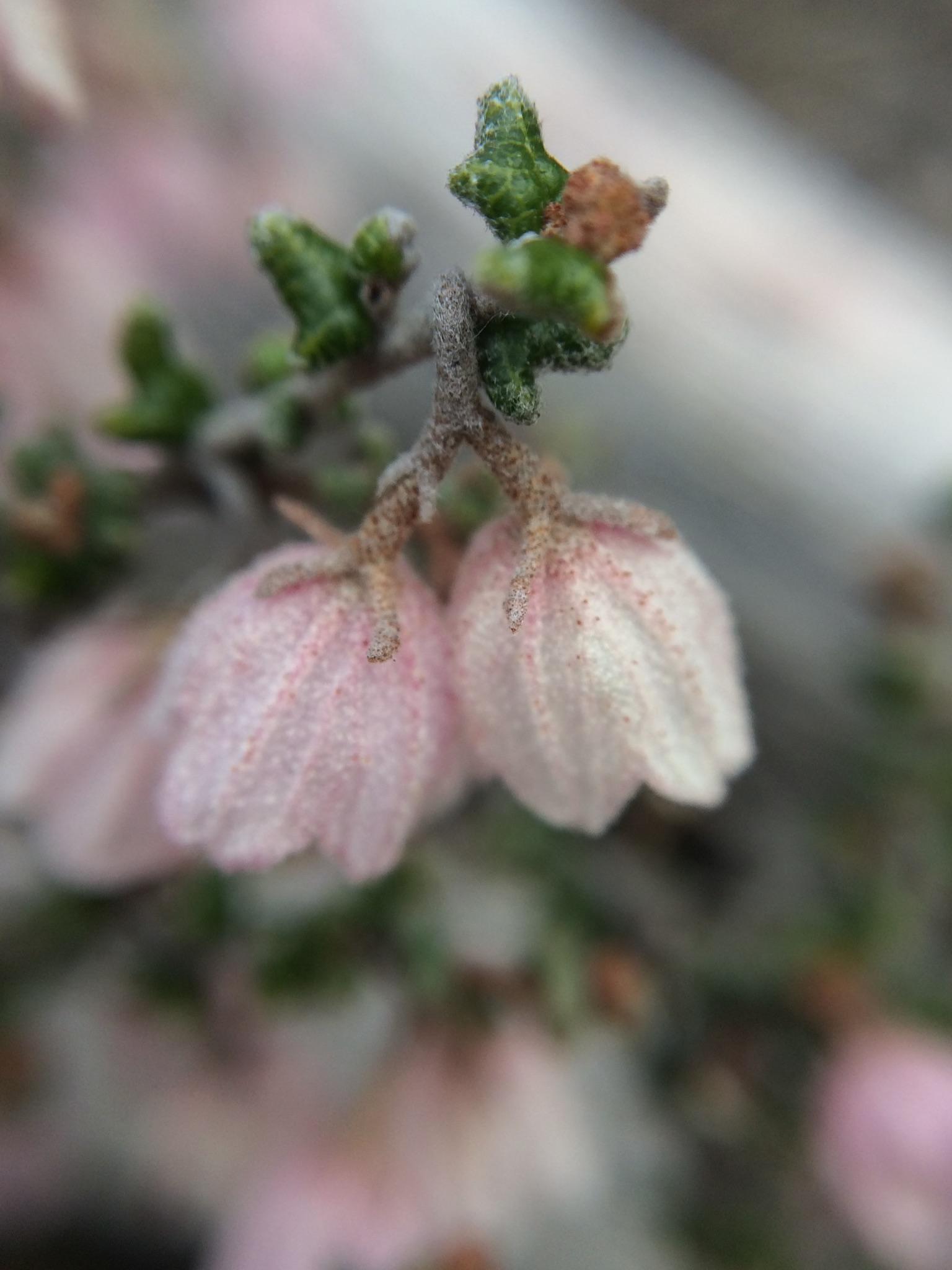

Conservation status
- Priority One — Poorly Known Taxa (DEC)

Scientific classification
- Kingdom: Plantae
- Clade: Tracheophytes
- Clade: Angiosperms
- Clade: Eudicots
- Clade: Rosids
- Order: Malvales
- Family: Malvaceae
- Genus: Guichenotia
- Species: G. apetala

Binomial name
- Guichenotia apetala A.S.George

= Guichenotia apetala =

Species of flowering plant

Guichenotia apetala is a flowering plant in the family Malvaceae and is endemic to a small area in the southwest of Western Australia. It is a small, erect, compact shrub with many branches, densely hairy new growth, triangular to heart-shaped leaves, and salmon pink flowers.

== Description ==
Guichenotia apetala is an erect, compact shrub that typically grows to 10–50 cm (3.9–19.7 in) high and wide, and has many branches. It new growth is densely covered with white, star-shaped hairs sometimes with a dark centre. The leaves are triangular to heart-shaped or arrow-shaped, 2.5–3.0 mm (0.098–0.118 in) long on a petiole less than 0.5 mm (0.020 in) long and lacking stipules. The lower surface of the leaves is densely covered with star-shaped hairs with a dark brown centre, giving it a scaly appearance. The flowers are borne singly or in small groups on a peduncle 1–4 mm (0.039–0.157 in) long, each flower on a hairy pedicel 1–5 mm (0.039–0.197 in) long, with one or two linear bracts 2–5 mm (0.079–0.197 in) long and three linear bracteoles at the base. The flowers are pendent, with salmon pink, petal-like sepals 5–7 mm (0.20–0.28 in) long, prominently ribbed, and joined for three-quarters of their length. There are no petals or staminodes and the stamens are red. Flowering occurs from September to December and the fruit is an oblong capsule 3.5–4.0 mm (0.14–0.16 in) long.

== Taxonomy and naming ==
Guichenotia apetala was first formally described in 1967 by Alex George and the description was published in the Journal of the Royal Society of Western Australia from specimens collected by Ted Aplin on Mount Desmond near Ravensthorpe in 1963. The specific epithet (apetala) means "without petals", although the more recently described G. anota also lacks petals.

== Distribution and habitat ==
This species of guichenotia grows open mallee scrubland, and is only known from Mount Desmond in the Esperance Plains bioregion of south-western Western Australia.

== Conservation status ==
Guichenotia apetala is listed as "Priority One" by the Government of Western Australia Department of Biodiversity, Conservation and Attractions, meaning that it is known from only one or a few locations that are potentially at risk.
