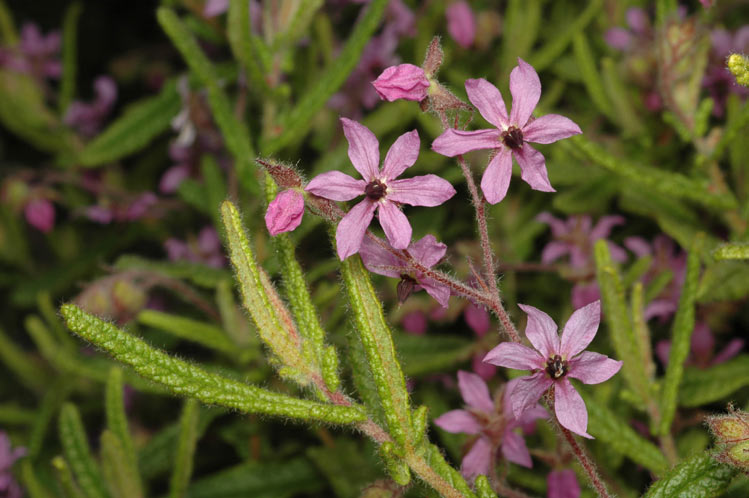
- In Kings Park

Conservation status
- Critically endangered (EPBC Act)

Scientific classification
- Kingdom: Plantae
- Clade: Tracheophytes
- Clade: Angiosperms
- Clade: Eudicots
- Clade: Rosids
- Order: Malvales
- Family: Malvaceae
- Genus: Lysiosepalum
- Species: L. abollatum

Binomial name
- Lysiosepalum abollatum C.F.Wilkins

Synonyms
- Lysiosepalum abollatum Paczk. & A.R.Chapm. nom. inval.

= Lysiosepalum abollatum =

Species of flowering plant

Lysiosepalum abollatum, also known as woolly lysiosepalum, is a species of flowering plant in the family Malvaceae and is endemic to a small area in the south-west of Western Australia. It is an erect, dense shrub covered with white, woolly hairs, and has narrowly egg-shaped leaves and pink, blue or purple flowers usually in groups of four or five.

== Description ==
Lysiosepalum abollatum is an erect, dense shrub that typically grows up to 1.5 m (4 ft 11 in) high and wide, and has most parts covered with white, woolly, star-shaped hairs. The leaves are narrowly egg-shaped, 10–16 mm (0.39–0.63 in) long and 2–3 mm (0.079–0.118 in) wide on a petiole 0.5–1 mm (0.020–0.039 in) wide, usually with stipules 0.6–1.5 mm (0.024–0.059 in) long at the base. The flowers are pink, purple or blue, borne in groups of four or five on a peduncle 10–35 mm (0.39–1.38 in) long with linear or spoon-shaped bracts 5–10 mm (0.20–0.39 in) long at the base, each flower on a pedicel 5–12 mm (0.20–0.47 in) long. The five sepals are egg-shaped, elliptic or oblong, 6.5–11.5 mm (0.26–0.45 in) long and 3.2–3.5 mm (0.13–0.14 in) wide. Petals are usually present, and are dark red, 0.8–1.5 mm (0.031–0.059 in) long. Flowering occurs in August and September.

== Taxonomy ==
Lysiosepalum abollatum was first formally described in 2001 by Carolyn F. Wilkins in the journal Nuytsia from specimens collected near Wongan Hills in 1996. The specific epithet (abollatum) means "a robe of thick, woolen stuff, worn by soldiers and philosopheers", referring to the woolly appearance of this species.

== Distribution and habitat ==
Woolly lysiosepalum has a very restricted natural range; they are found only in the Wongan Hills area of the Avon Wheatbelt IBRA bioregion, some 180 km north-east of Perth, in south-west Western Australia. They grow in open mallee-heath on orange-brown, sandy clay, lateritic soils on the lower slopes and at the bases of hills. Associated vegetation includes Eucalyptus ebbanoensis, Acacia pharangites and A. congesta over an understorey of Halgania, Allocasuarina, Leptospermum and Hibbertia species.

== Conservation ==
The species has been listed as Critically Endangered under Australia's EPBC Act and as "Threatened" by the Western Australian Government Department of Biodiversity, Conservation and Attractions, meaning that it is in danger of extinction. The main threats are land clearing for agriculture, soil erosion, and grazing by rabbits and kangaroos.
