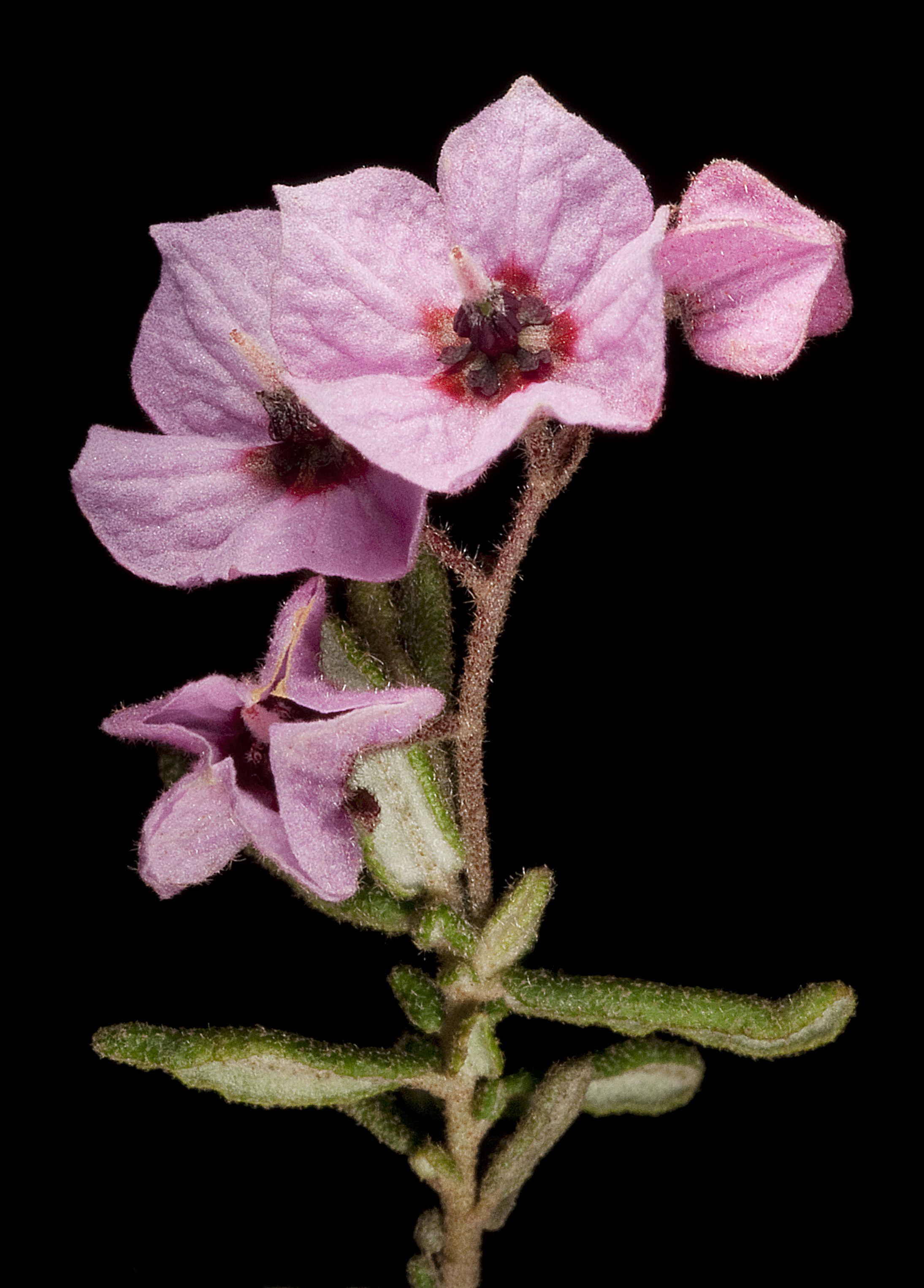

Scientific classification
- Kingdom: Plantae
- Clade: Tracheophytes
- Clade: Angiosperms
- Clade: Eudicots
- Clade: Rosids
- Order: Malvales
- Family: Malvaceae
- Genus: Guichenotia
- Species: G. micrantha

Binomial name
- Guichenotia micrantha (Steetz) Benth.

Synonyms
- Sarotes micrantha Steetz; Sarotes pogonanthera F.Muell. nom. inval., pro syn.; Thomasia pogonanthera F.Muell.

= Guichenotia micrantha =

Small flowered guichenotia

Species of flowering plant

Guichenotia micrantha, commonly known as small flowered guichenotia, is a species of flowering plant in the family Malvaceae and is endemic to the south-west of Western Australia. It is a low, compact shrub with linear to narrowly egg-shaped leaves and pink flowers in groups of three to six.

== Description ==
Guichenotia micrantha is a compact shrub that typically grows to 0.3–1.5 m (1 ft 0 in – 4 ft 11 in) high and wide, its new growth densely covered with star-shaped hairs. The leaves are linear to narrowly egg-shaped, 6–20 mm (0.24–0.79 in) long and 1–2 mm (0.039–0.079 in) wide on a short petiole, usually with stipules 1.0–2.5 mm (0.039–0.098 in) long at the base. The edges of the leaves are rolled under, and both surface are covered with star-shaped hairs, more densely so on the lower surface. The flowers are 8–10 mm (0.31–0.39 in) in diameter, arranged in cymes of three to six on a peduncle 4–12 mm (0.16–0.47 in) long, each flower on a pedicel 4–7 mm (0.16–0.28 in) long. There is a single egg-shaped bract and three lance-shaped bracteoles. The pink, petal-like sepals are deep red at the base, and joined for most of their length, each with three to five hairy ribs, and covered with star-shaped hairs. There are tiny, deep red petals and staminodes. Flowering occurs from June to November.

== Taxonomy and naming ==
Guichenotia micrantha was first formally described in 1846 by Joachim Steetz who gave it the name Sarotes micrantha in Lehmann's Plantae Preissianae from specimens collected in the Swan River Colony by James Drummond. In 1863, George Bentham transferred to species to Guichenotia as G. micrantha in Flora Australiensis. The specific epithet (micrantha) means "small-flowered".

== Distribution and habitat ==
Small-flowered guichenotia grows on sand and laterite on sandplains, rocky hills and granite outcrops between Geraldton and Esperance, and as far inland as Eneabba and Southern Cross excluding the far south-west corner, in the Avon Wheatbelt, Esperance Plains, Geraldton Sandplains, Jarrah Forest, Mallee and Swan Coastal Plain bioregions of south-western Western Australia.

== Conservation status ==
Guichenotia micrantha is listed as "not threatened" by the Western Australian Government Department of Biodiversity, Conservation and Attractions.
