= Guichenotia glandulosa =

Conservation status
- Priority Two — Poorly Known Taxa (DEC)

Scientific classification
- Kingdom: Plantae
- Clade: Tracheophytes
- Clade: Angiosperms
- Clade: Eudicots
- Clade: Rosids
- Order: Malvales
- Family: Malvaceae
- Genus: Guichenotia
- Species: G. glandulosa

Binomial name
- Guichenotia glandulosa Wilkins

Species of flowering plant

Guichenotia glandulosa is a species of flowering plant in the family Malvaceae and is endemic to a small area in the south-west of Western Australia. It is a spreading, dwarf shrub with hairy new growth, more or less linear leaves with the edges turned down, and pink flowers arranged in groups of six or seven.

== Description ==
Guichenotia glandulosa is a spreading, dwarf shrub that typically grows to 30–60 cm (12–24 in) high and 30–50 cm (12–20 in) wide, its new growth covered with a mixture of red glandular hairs and white, star-shaped hairs. The leaves are more or less linear, 11–35 mm (0.43–1.38 in) long and 2–3 mm (0.079–0.118 in) wide on a petiole 1–2 mm (0.039–0.079 in) long. The edges of the leaves are turned down, and both surfaces of the leaves are covered with white, star-shaped hairs, more densely so on the lower surface. The flowers are borne in groups of six or seven on a peduncle 10–25 mm (0.39–0.98 in) long, each flower on a pedicel 10 mm (0.39 in) long and covered with long, glandular hairs. There are egg-shaped bracts 5–8 mm (0.20–0.31 in) long and bracteoles about 3 mm (0.12 in) long at the base. The five pink, petal-like sepals are 9.5–10.5 mm (0.37–0.41 in) long and joined at their base, and there are tiny, deep red petals but no staminodes. Flowering occurs in August and September and the fruit is a papery capsule 7–10 mm (0.28–0.39 in) long.

== Taxonomy and naming ==
Guichenotia glandulosa was first formally described in 2003 by Carolyn F. Wilkins in Australian Systematic Botany from specimens collected in Uberin Rock Reserve, south-east of Wongan Hills 2000. The specific epithet (glandulosa) means "gland-bearing", referring to the pedicels.

== Distribution and habitat ==
This species of guichenotia grows in sedgeland and along creeklines near Wongan Hills in the Avon Wheatbelt bioregion of south-western Western Australia.

== Conservation status ==
Guichenotia glandulosa is listed as "Priority Two" by the Western Australian Government Department of Biodiversity, Conservation and Attractions, meaning that it is poorly known and from only one or a few locations.
