= Guichenotia impudica =

Conservation status
- Priority Three — Poorly Known Taxa (DEC)

Scientific classification
- Kingdom: Plantae
- Clade: Tracheophytes
- Clade: Angiosperms
- Clade: Eudicots
- Clade: Rosids
- Order: Malvales
- Family: Malvaceae
- Genus: Guichenotia
- Species: G. impudica

Binomial name
- Guichenotia impudica Wilkins

Species of flowering plant

Guichenotia impudica is a species of flowering plant in the family Malvaceae and is endemic to the south-west of Western Australia. It is a spreading, dwarf shrub with hairy new growth, more or less linear leaves with the edges turned down, and pink flowers arranged in groups of six or seven.

== Description ==
Guichenotia impudica is a spreading, dwarf shrub that typically grows to 30–60 cm (12–24 in) high and 30–50 cm (12–20 in) wide, its new growth covered with a mixture of red glandular hairs and white, star-shaped hairs. The leaves are more or less linear, 1–8 mm (0.039–0.315 in) long and 1–2 mm (0.039–0.079 in) wide on a petiole less than 1–2 mm (0.039–0.079 in) long. The edges of the leaves are turned down or rolled under, and both surfaces of the leaves are covered with white, star-shaped hairs. The flowers are borne in groups of two to four on a peduncle 1.5–8 mm (0.059–0.315 in) long, each flower on a pedicel 2–6 mm (0.079–0.236 in) long with narrowly elliptic bracts 1.0–2.5 mm (0.039–0.098 in) long and bracteoles 1.5–3.0 mm (0.059–0.118 in) long at the base. The five mauve to pink, petal-like sepals are 6.5–10 mm (0.26–0.39 in) long and joined at their base, and there are tiny, deep red petals and narrowly triangular staminodes. Flowering occurs from August and October.

== Taxonomy and naming ==
Guichenotia impudica was first formally described in 2003 by Carolyn F. Wilkins in Australian Systematic Botany from specimens collected near the road between Wongan Hills and Goomalling in 1996. The specific epithet (impudica) means "shameless", referring to the large pink flowers.

== Distribution and habitat ==
This species of guichenotia grows in shrubland and woodland in scattered, disjunct populations from near Tammin to north of Kalbarri in the Avon Wheatbelt, Geraldton Sandplains and Jarrah Forest bioregions of south-western Western Australia.

== Conservation status ==
Guichenotia impudica is listed as "Priority Three" by the Government of Western Australia Department of Biodiversity, Conservation and Attractions, meaning that it is poorly known and known from only a few locations but is not under imminent threat.
