= Lysiosepalum aromaticum =

Conservation status
- Priority Two — Poorly Known Taxa (DEC)

Scientific classification
- Kingdom: Plantae
- Clade: Tracheophytes
- Clade: Angiosperms
- Clade: Eudicots
- Clade: Rosids
- Order: Malvales
- Family: Malvaceae
- Genus: Lysiosepalum
- Species: L. aromaticum

Binomial name
- Lysiosepalum aromaticum C.F.Wilkins

Species of flowering plant

Lysiosepalum aromaticum is a species of flowering plant in the family Malvaceae and is endemic to a small area in the south-west of Western Australia. It is thick, bushy shrub with a strong, aromatic scent, most parks covered with white, star-shaped hairs and red-tipped, club-shaped hairs, and has egg-shaped to broadly egg-shaped leaves and pinkish-purple flowers usually in groups of two to four.

== Description ==
Lysiosepalum aromaticum is a thick, bushy shrub that typically grows to a height of up to 75 cm (30 in) and has a strong aromatic or peppery scent. Most part of the plant are covered with white, star-shaped hairs and red-tipped, club-shaped glandular hairs. The leaves are egg-shaped to broadly egg-shaped, 15–40 mm (0.59–1.57 in) long and 3–6 mm (0.12–0.24 in) wide on a petiole 4–7 mm (0.16–0.28 in) long, usually with stipules 2–6 mm (0.079–0.236 in) long at the base. The flowers are pinkish-purple, borne in groups of two to four on a peduncle 9–20 mm (0.35–0.79 in) long with spoon-shaped bracts 3–7.5 mm (0.12–0.30 in) long at the base, each flower on a pedicel 5–6 mm (0.20–0.24 in) long. The five sepal lobes are elliptic, about 6 mm (0.24 in) long and 2–4 mm (0.079–0.157 in) wide, the petals tiny and bright red. Flowering occurs in October and November.

== Taxonomy ==
Lysiosepalum aromaticum was first formally described in 2001 by Carolyn F. Wilkins in the journal Nuytsia from specimens collected in 1998. The specific epithet (aromaticum) means "aromatic", referring to the spicy odour of this species.

== Distribution and habitat ==
This species of lysiosepalum is found on slopes and in moist areas near granite outcrops in a single population near Highbury in the Avon Wheatbelt IBRA bioregion in the south-west of Western Australia.

== Conservation status ==
Lysiosepalum aromaticum is listed as "Priority Two" by the Western Australian Government Department of Biodiversity, Conservation and Attractions, meaning that it is poorly known and from only one or a few locations.
