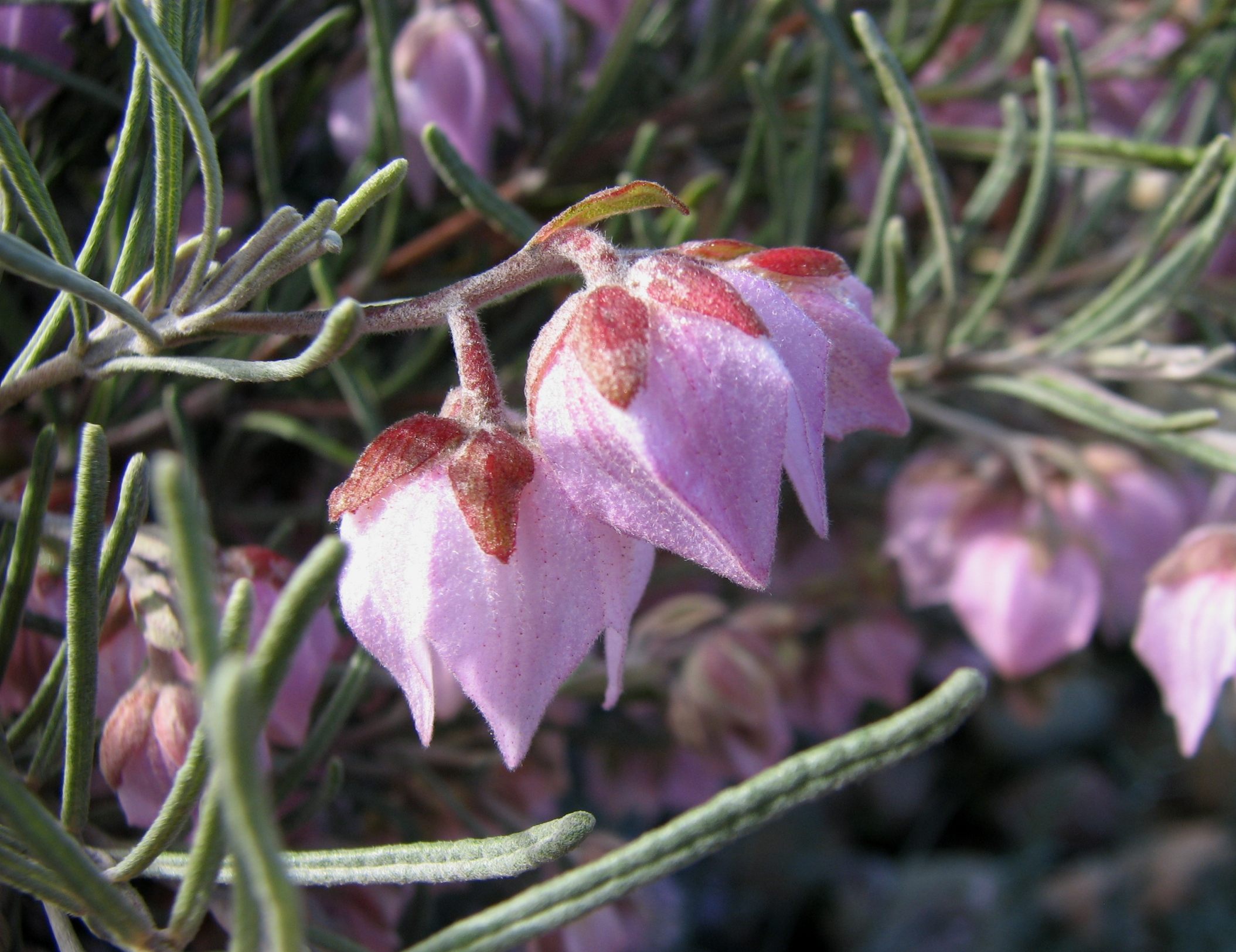

Scientific classification
- Kingdom: Plantae
- Clade: Tracheophytes
- Clade: Angiosperms
- Clade: Eudicots
- Clade: Rosids
- Order: Malvales
- Family: Malvaceae
- Genus: Guichenotia
- Species: G. macrantha

Binomial name
- Guichenotia macrantha Turcz.

= Guichenotia macrantha =

Large-flowered guichenotia

Species of flowering plant

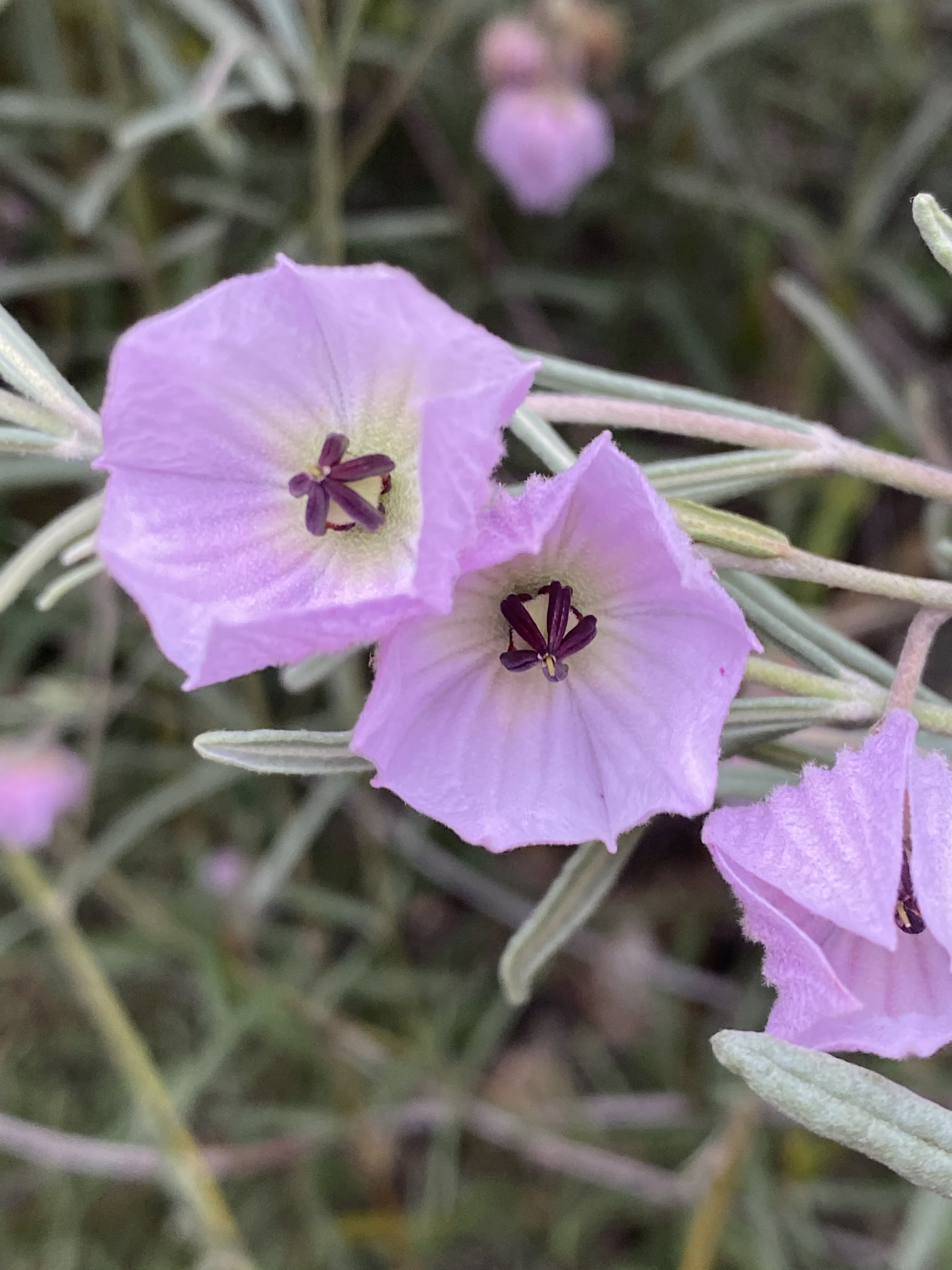
Close-up of flowers

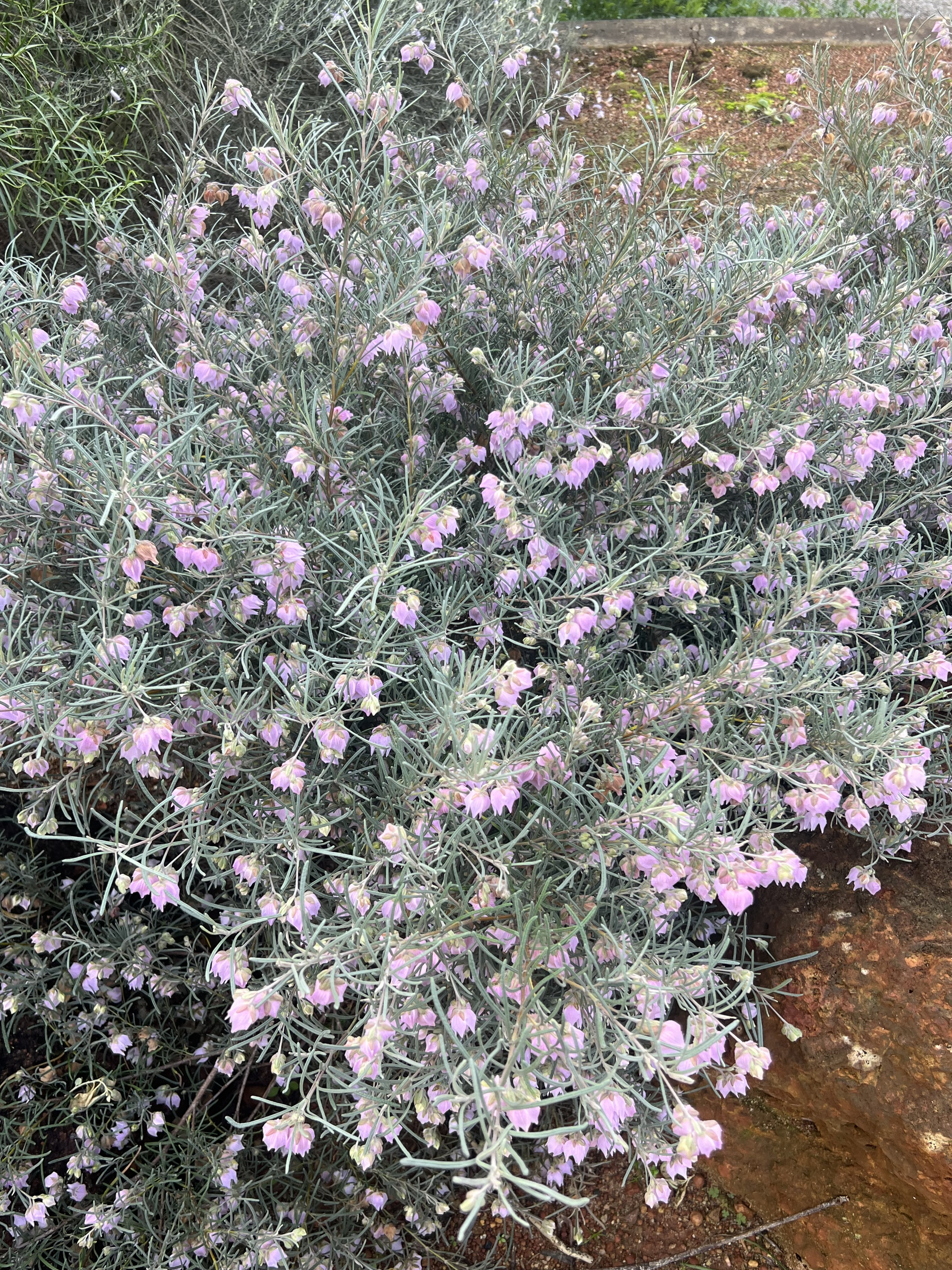
Habit

Guichenotia macrantha, commonly known as large-flowered guichenotia, is a species of flowering plant in the family Malvaceae. It is a shrub with grey-green leaves, mauve flowers and is endemic to Western Australia.

== Description ==
Guichenotia macrantha is an open, upright, or sometimes a straggling small or tall shrub to 1–2 m (3 ft 3 in – 6 ft 7 in) high, 1.5–2 m (4 ft 11 in – 6 ft 7 in) wide with new growth covered in star-shaped hairs. The leaves are linear to oblong shaped, upper surface grey-green, 20–95 mm (0.79–3.74 in) long, 1.5–2 mm (0.059–0.079 in) wide, margins rolled under, lower surface yellowish-green, wrinkled, thickly hairy, rounded apex on a petiole 2–3 mm (0.079–0.118 in) long. The calyx lobes are mauve, pink-purple, sometimes white, each lobe with three distinct ribs, 1.5–2.5 cm (0.59–0.98 in) in diameter, divided to halfway, petals deep red, small, pedicel 8–15 mm (0.31–0.59 in) long and peduncles 18–50 mm (0.71–1.97 in) long. The bracts are leaf-like, oval-shaped, 8–12 mm (0.31–0.47 in) long, 1–2 mm (0.039–0.079 in) wide and borne at the base of each pedicel. Flowering occurs from May to September and the fruit is a woody, elliptic-shaped capsule.

== Taxonomy and naming ==
Guichenotia macrantha was first formally described in 1846 by Russian botanist Nikolai Turczaninow and the description was published in Bulletin de la Société Impériale des Naturalistes de Moscou. The specific epithet (macrantha) means "large flowered".

== Distribution and habitat ==
Large-flowered guichenotia grows on a variety of soils including clay sands, sands, gravel and granite from the Murchison River to Merredin.
