= Guichenotia alba =

Conservation status
- Priority Three — Poorly Known Taxa (DEC)

Scientific classification
- Kingdom: Plantae
- Clade: Embryophytes
- Clade: Tracheophytes
- Clade: Spermatophytes
- Clade: Angiosperms
- Clade: Eudicots
- Clade: Rosids
- Order: Malvales
- Family: Malvaceae
- Genus: Guichenotia
- Species: G. alba

Binomial name
- Guichenotia alba Keighery

Species of flowering plant

Guichenotia alba is a flowering plant in the family Malvaceae and is endemic to Western Australia. It is a slender, spreading shrub with lax, hairy young branches, leaves with the edges rolled under, and white flowers.

== Description ==
Guichenotia alba is a slender, spreading shrub that typically grows to 10–50 cm (3.9–19.7 in) high and 30–80 cm (12–31 in) wide with many stems at the base but few branches. Its young branches are densely covered with woolly, star-shaped hairs. The leaves are 13–22 mm (0.51–0.87 in) long, the edges rolled under, on a petiole 0.5 mm (0.020 in) long with stipules up to two-thirds the length of the leaves. The leaves are densely woolly-hairy when young, but later glabrous. The flowers are borne singly, in pairs or groups of three, on a peduncle 3–6 mm (0.12–0.24 in) long, each flower on a pedicel 6–9 mm (0.24–0.35 in) long, with narrowly egg-shaped bracts 2–5 mm (0.079–0.197 in) long and bracteoles 2–3 mm (0.079–0.118 in) long at the base. The flowers are bell-shaped with five divided, petal-like sepals 11–13 mm (0.43–0.51 in) long, that are white on the outside, pale green inside. There are five tiny white, scale-like petals and the stamens are red. Flowering occurs in July and August and the fruit is a capsule 4–5 mm (0.16–0.20 in) in diameter.

== Taxonomy and naming ==
Guichenotia alba was first formally described in 1992 by Greg Keighery and the description was published in the journal Nuytsia from specimens he collected near Cataby in 1988. The specific epithet (alba) means "white".

== Distribution and habitat ==
This species of Guichenotia grows in heath, often in winter-wet areas, in a few places between Three Springs and Cataby in the Avon Wheatbelt, Geraldton Sandplains and Swan Coastal Plain bioregions of south-western Western Australia.

== Conservation status ==
Guichenotia alba is listed as "Priority Three" by the Government of Western Australia Department of Biodiversity, Conservation and Attractions, meaning that it is poorly known and known from only a few locations but is not under imminent threat.
