= Guichenotia asteriskos =

Conservation status
- Priority Two — Poorly Known Taxa (DEC)

Scientific classification
- Kingdom: Plantae
- Clade: Tracheophytes
- Clade: Angiosperms
- Clade: Eudicots
- Clade: Rosids
- Order: Malvales
- Family: Malvaceae
- Genus: Guichenotia
- Species: G. asteriskos

Binomial name
- Guichenotia asteriskos Wilkins

Species of flowering plant

Guichenotia asteriskos is a flowering plant in the family Malvaceae and is endemic to the southwest of Western Australia. It is a dwarf, spreading shrub with hairy new growth, linear to narrowly egg-shaped leaves, and white flowers.

== Description ==
Guichenotia asteriskos is a dwarf, spreading shrub that typically grows to 20–35 cm (7.9–13.8 in) high and wide, its new growth covered with white, star-shaped hairs. The leaves are linear to narrowly egg-shaped, 5–9 mm (0.20–0.35 in) long and about 1.5 mm (0.059 in) wide on a petiole 3–8 mm (0.12–0.31 in) long and lacking stipules. The edges of the leaves are rolled under, both surfaces of the leaves are densely covered with star-shaped hairs, the upper surface becoming glabrous. The flowers are borne singly in upper leaf axils on a peduncle 4–5 mm (0.16–0.20 in) long, each flower on a pedicel 1–2 mm (0.039–0.079 in) long, with bracts 1–2 mm (0.039–0.079 in) long and tiny, triangular bracteoles at the base. There are five petal-like sepals 5–8 mm (0.20–0.31 in) long divided for three-quarters of their length, and there are tiny, dark red petals but no staminodes. Flowering occurs in September and October and the fruit is an elliptic capsule about 3.5 mm (0.14 in) long.

== Taxonomy and naming ==
Guichenotia asteriskos was first formally described in 2003 by Carolyn F. Wilkins in Australian Systematic Botany from specimens she collected near Newdegate in 1995. The specific epithet (asteriskos) means "small star", referring to shape of the flowers when they first open.

== Distribution and habitat ==
This species of guichenotia grows as an understorey plant in shrubland in the Avon Wheatbelt, Mallee and Esperance Plains bioregions of south-western Western Australia.

== Conservation status ==
Guichenotia asteriskos is listed as "Priority Two" by the Western Australian Government Department of Biodiversity, Conservation and Attractions, meaning that it is poorly known and from only one or a few locations.
