= Guichenotia astropletha =

Scientific classification
- Kingdom: Plantae
- Clade: Tracheophytes
- Clade: Angiosperms
- Clade: Eudicots
- Clade: Rosids
- Order: Malvales
- Family: Malvaceae
- Genus: Guichenotia
- Species: G. astropletha

Binomial name
- Guichenotia astropletha Wilkins

Species of flowering plant

Guichenotia astropletha is a flowering plant in the family Malvaceae and is endemic to the southwest of Western Australia. It is a dwarf, spreading shrub with hairy new growth, linear to narrowly egg-shaped leaves, and pink flowers.

== Description ==
Guichenotia astropletha is a dwarf, spreading shrub that typically grows to 20–60 cm (7.9–23.6 in) high and 30–60 cm (12–24 in) wide, its new growth covered with white, star-shaped hairs. The leaves are linear to narrowly egg-shaped, 7–25 mm (0.28–0.98 in) long and 2–5 mm (0.079–0.197 in) wide on a petiole about 1 mm (0.039 in) long with stipules 6–14 mm (0.24–0.55 in) long at the base. The edges of the leaves are rolled under, and both surfaces of the leaves are densely covered with white, star-shaped hairs. The flowers are borne in groups of 2 to 5 on a peduncle 10–50 mm (0.39–1.97 in) long, each flower on a pedicel 3–8 mm (0.12–0.31 in) long, with egg-shaped bracts and bracteoles 3–6 mm (0.12–0.24 in) long at the base. There are five pink, petal-like sepals 10–20 mm (0.39–0.79 in) long and deep red petals 1–2 mm (0.039–0.079 in) long but no staminodes. Flowering occurs from August to October and the fruit is a capsule 3–5 mm (0.12–0.20 in) long.

== Taxonomy and naming ==
Guichenotia astropletha was first formally described in 2003 by Carolyn F. Wilkins in Australian Systematic Botany from specimens collected near the Marchagee Track in 1995. The specific epithet (astropletha) means "a starry cloud", referring to the white, star-shaped hairs on the ovary.

== Distribution and habitat ==
This species of guichenotia grows as an understorey plant in a variety of habitats from heath to woodland between Merredin and Three Springs in the Avon Wheatbelt and Geraldton Sandplains bioregions of south-western Western Australia.

== Conservation status ==
Guichenotia astropletha is listed as "not threatened" by the Western Australian Government Department of Biodiversity, Conservation and Attractions.
