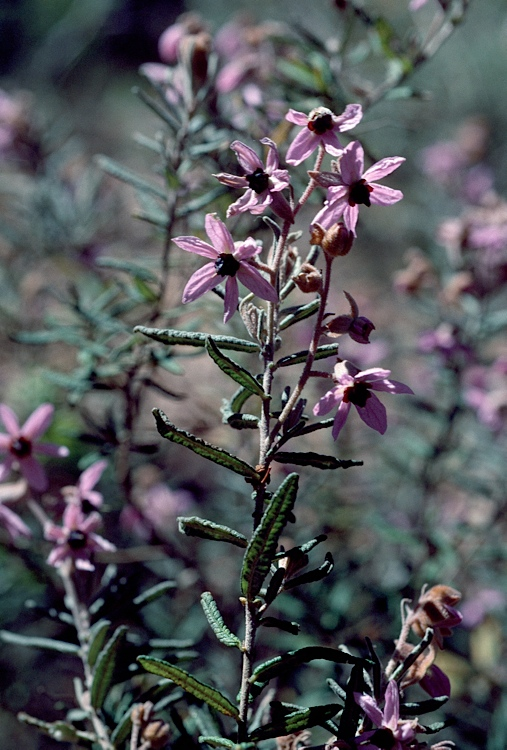

Scientific classification
- Kingdom: Plantae
- Clade: Tracheophytes
- Clade: Angiosperms
- Clade: Eudicots
- Clade: Rosids
- Order: Malvales
- Family: Malvaceae
- Genus: Guichenotia
- Species: G. angustifolia

Binomial name
- Guichenotia angustifolia (Turcz.) Druce

Synonyms
- Ditomostrophe angustifolia Turcz.; Guichenotia angustifolia (Turcz.) C.A.Gardner isonym; Guichenotia semihastata (F.Muell.) Benth. nom. illeg.; Sarotes semihastata F.Muell.; Thomasia steetziana Turcz. nom. illeg.

= Guichenotia angustifolia =

Species of flowering plant

Guichenotia angustifolia is a species of flowering plant in the family Malvaceae and is endemic to the south-west of Western Australia. It is an erect, prostrate or climbing shrub with hairy young growth, hairy, oblong to linear leaves and pink to mauve flowers.

== Description ==
Guichenotia angustifolia is an erect, prostrate or climbing shrub that typically grows to 0.15–1.5 m (5.9 in – 4 ft 11.1 in) high and 1.5–2 m (4 ft 11 in – 6 ft 7 in) wide, its young branches densely covered with star-shaped hairs. The leaves are oblong to linear, 8–40 mm (0.31–1.57 in) long and 1–4 mm (0.039–0.157 in) wide on a petiole 1–3 mm (0.039–0.118 in) long with lance-shaped stipules 1–12 mm (0.039–0.472 in) long at the base. Both surfaces of the leaves are covered with star-shaped hairs. The flowers are borne singly, in pairs or in cymes on a peduncle 10–40 mm (0.39–1.57 in) long, each flower or pair on a pedicel 6–12 mm (0.24–0.47 in) long, with bracts 2–7 mm (0.079–0.276 in) long and egg-shaped bracteoles 2–4 mm (0.079–0.157 in) long at the base. There are five, petal-like sepal lobes and five small red petals. Flowering occurs from July to November and the fruit is a papery capsule 7 mm (0.28 in) in diameter.

== Taxonomy and naming ==
This species was first formally described in 1846 by Nikolai Turczaninow who gave it the name Ditomostrophe angustifolia in the Bulletin de la Société Impériale des Naturalistes de Moscou, from specimens collected by James Drummond. In 1917, George Claridge Druce transferred the species to Guichenotia as G. angustifolia in the supplement to The Botanical Exchange Club and Society of the British Isles Report for 1916. The specific epithet (angustifolia) means "narrow leaved".

== Distribution and habitat ==
Guichenotia angustifolia usually grows in shrubland from near Perth to near Brookton and Northampton in the Avon Wheatbelt, Geraldton Sandplains and Jarrah Forest bioregions of south-western Western Australia.

== Conservation status ==
Guichenotia angustifolia is listed as "not threatened" by the Government of Western Australia Department of Biodiversity, Conservation and Attractions.
