= Guichenotia quasicalva =

Conservation status
- Priority Two — Poorly Known Taxa (DEC)

Scientific classification
- Kingdom: Plantae
- Clade: Tracheophytes
- Clade: Angiosperms
- Clade: Eudicots
- Clade: Rosids
- Order: Malvales
- Family: Malvaceae
- Genus: Guichenotia
- Species: G. quasicalva

Binomial name
- Guichenotia quasicalva C.F.Wilkins

Species of flowering plant

Guichenotia quasicalva is a species of flowering plant in the family Malvaceae and is endemic to the south-west of Western Australia. It is a low, spindly shrub with narrowly egg-shaped to linear leaves and pink flowers in groups of two to four.

== Description ==
Guichenotia quasicalva is a spindly shrub that typically grows to 30–60 cm (12–24 in) high and 20–30 cm (7.9–11.8 in) wide, its new growth covered with golden, star-shaped hairs. Its leaves are narrowly egg-shaped to linear, 15–30 mm (0.59–1.18 in) long and 1.5–4 mm (0.059–0.157 in) wide on a petiole 1–2 mm (0.039–0.079 in) long with stipules 3.5–10 mm (0.14–0.39 in) long at the base. The edges of the leaves are turned down, and both surface are sparsely covered with star-shaped hairs. The flowers are arranged in cymes of two to four, each flower 7–11 mm (0.28–0.43 in) in diameter on a peduncle 1.0–3.5 mm (0.039–0.138 in) long. Each flower is on a pedicel 4–12 mm (0.16–0.47 in) long with bracts 1.5–5 mm (0.059–0.197 in) long and bracteoles about 2 mm (0.079 in) long. The petal-like sepals are pink, joined at the base and glabrous inside, the outer surface covered with scattered, star-shaped hairs. There are tiny, deep red petals but no staminodes. Flowering occurs in September and October.

== Taxonomy and naming ==
Guichenotia quasicalva was first formally described in 2003 by Carolyn F. Wilkins and the description was published in Australian Systematic Botany. The specific epithet (quasicalva) means "almost bald", referring to the sparse covering of hairs on the stems, leaves and sepals.

== Distribution and habitat ==
This species of guichenotia grows in wet-wet places and near creeks in dense shrubland and open mallee in three populations near Eneabba in the Avon Wheatbelt and Geraldton Sandplains bioregions of south-western Western Australia.

== Conservation status ==
Guichenotia quasicalva is listed as "Priority Two" by the Western Australian Government Department of Biodiversity, Conservation and Attractions, meaning that it is poorly known and from only one or a few locations.
