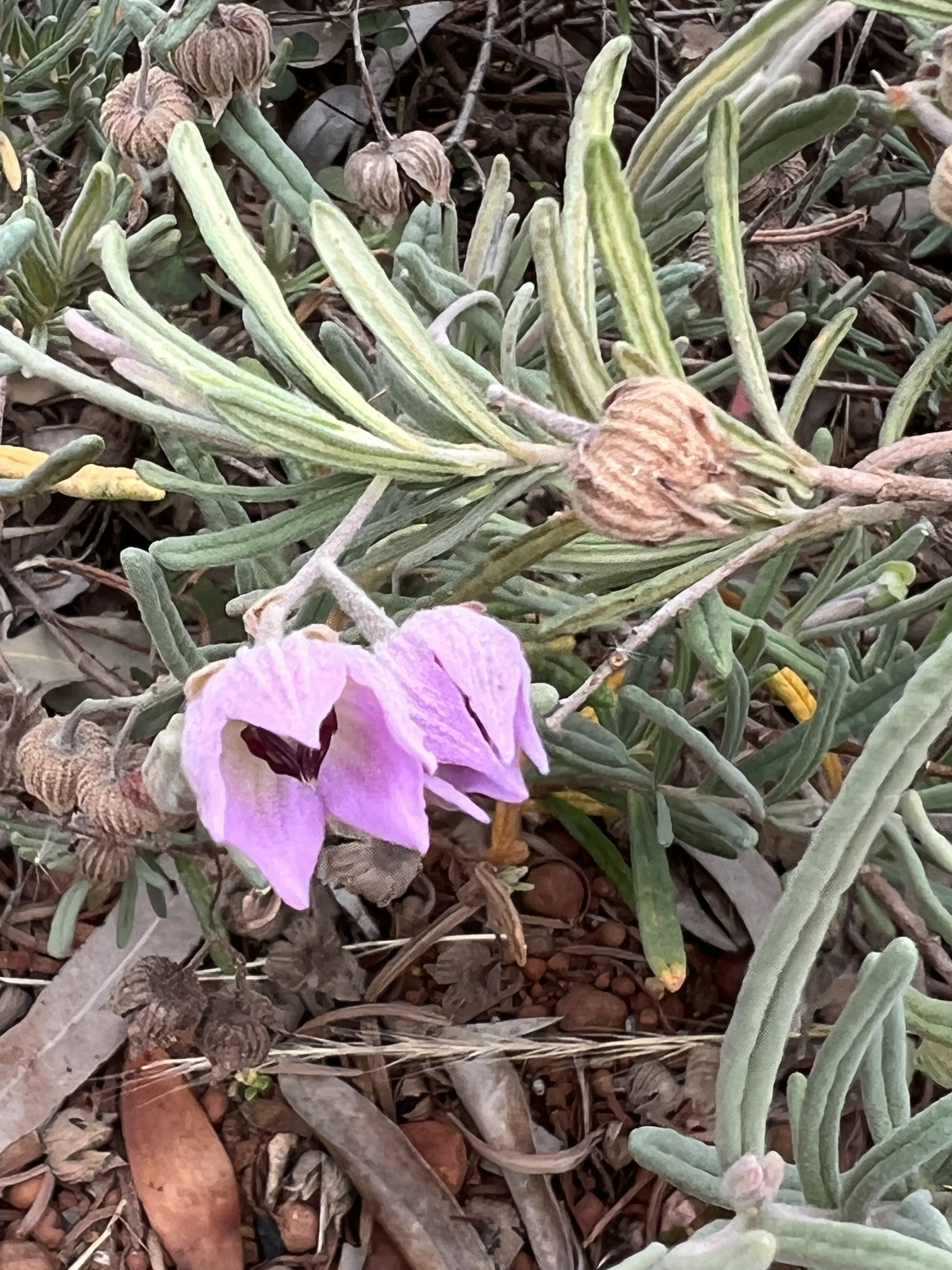

Scientific classification
- Kingdom: Plantae
- Clade: Tracheophytes
- Clade: Angiosperms
- Clade: Eudicots
- Clade: Rosids
- Order: Malvales
- Family: Malvaceae
- Genus: Guichenotia
- Species: G. intermedia

Binomial name
- Guichenotia intermedia C.F.Wilkins

= Guichenotia intermedia =

Species of flowering plant

Guichenotia intermedia is a flowering plant in the family Malvaceae and is endemic to Western Australia. It is a small shrub with hairy leaves and mauve-pink flowers.

== Description ==
Guichenotia intermedia is a small, upright, spreading shrub to 0.3–1.5 m (1 ft 0 in – 4 ft 11 in) high, 1 m (3 ft 3 in) wide and new growth covered in white star-shaped hairs. The leaves are linear shaped, 18–21 mm (0.71–0.83 in) long, 1.5–2 mm (0.059–0.079 in) wide, upper and lower surfaces covered densely with white star-shaped hairs, margins rolled under and rounded at the apex. The flowers are borne in clusters of two or three, 2–2.5 cm (0.79–0.98 in) in diameter on a peduncle 7–16 mm (0.28–0.63 in) long and the petals are dark red up to 2 mm (0.079 in) long. The calyx are mauve-pink, lobes 10–15 mm (0.39–0.59 in) long, joined halfway, inner surface has star-shaped hairs, outer surface has white star-shaped hairs and the pedicel 10 mm (0.39 in) long. The green bracts are at the base of each pedicel, oval-shaped, 7–9 mm (0.28–0.35 in) long and 3–4 mm (0.12–0.16 in) wide. Flowering occurs in May or July to August and the fruit is woody, thin and 8 mm (0.31 in) in diameter.

== Taxonomy and naming ==
Guichenotia intermedia was first formally described in 2003 by Carolyn F. Wilkins and the description was published in Australian Systematic Botany. The specific epithet (intermedia) means "coming between".

== Distribution and habitat ==
This species of guichenotia is found on scrublands, roadsides, sandy flats and coastal heath from Kalbarri and north to Shark Bay.
