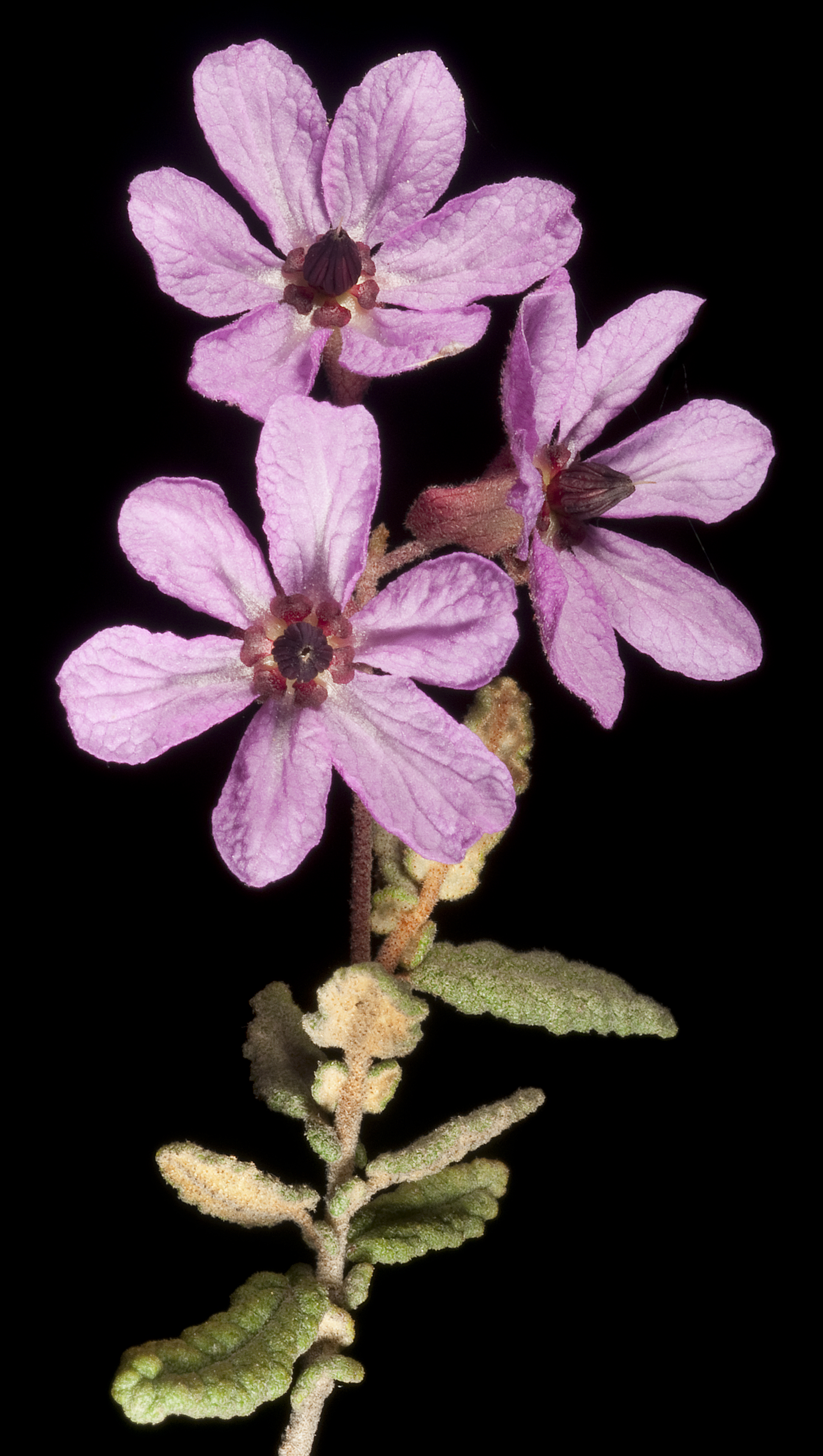
- Flowers and leaves

Scientific classification
- Kingdom: Plantae
- Clade: Tracheophytes
- Clade: Angiosperms
- Clade: Eudicots
- Clade: Rosids
- Order: Malvales
- Family: Malvaceae
- Genus: Lysiosepalum
- Species: L. rugosum

Binomial name
- Lysiosepalum rugosum Benth.

= Lysiosepalum rugosum =

Species of flowering plant

Lysiosepalum rugosum, also known as the wrinkled-leaf lysiosepalum, is a species of flowering plant in the mallow family and is endemic to the south-west of Western Australia. It is shrub with its young branches covered with woolly, star-shaped hairs, and has narrowly egg-shaped leaves and blue, purple of pink flowers usually in groups of 4 to 6.

== Description ==
Lysiosepalum rugosum grows is a shrub that typically grows to a height of 0.3–1 m (1 ft 0 in – 3 ft 3 in) and has its young branches with woolly, star-shaped hairs. The leaves are narrowly egg-shaped, 4–20 mm (0.16–0.79 in) long and 0.8–2 mm (0.031–0.079 in) wide on a petiole 1–4 mm (0.039–0.157 in) long with stipules about 0.8 mm (0.031 in) long and wide at the bottom of the petiole. The flowers are blue, purple of pink, usually borne in groups of 6 to 8 on a peduncle 9–25 mm (0.35–0.98 in) long with linear or spoon-shaped bracts 1.5–6 mm (0.059–0.236 in) long at the base, each flower on a pedicel 5.5–7 mm (0.22–0.28 in) long with linear to egg-shaped bracteoles 5–10 mm (0.20–0.39 in) long at the base of the sepals. The six sepal lobes are egg-shaped or elliptic, 5–10 mm (0.20–0.39 in) long and 2–6 mm (0.079–0.236 in) wide, and there are sometimes dark red petals 0.8–1.2 mm (0.031–0.047 in) long. Flowering occurs from July to October and the fruit is about 4 mm (0.16 in) long and 3 mm (0.12 in) wide.

== Taxonomy ==
Lysiosepalum rugosum was first formlly described in 1863 by George Bentham in his Flora Australiensis from specimens collected near the Swan River Colony by James Drummond. The specific epithet (rugosum) means "wrinkled", referring to the surface of the leaves.

== Distribution and habitat ==
Wrinkled-leaf lysiosepalum grows in a range of soils, but usually on lateritic gravels in open woodland and shrubland, and is widely distributed from north-east of Geraldton to Manmanning in the Avon Wheatbelt, Coolgardie, Geraldton Sandplains and Jarrah Forest IBRA bioregions of south-west Western Australia.
