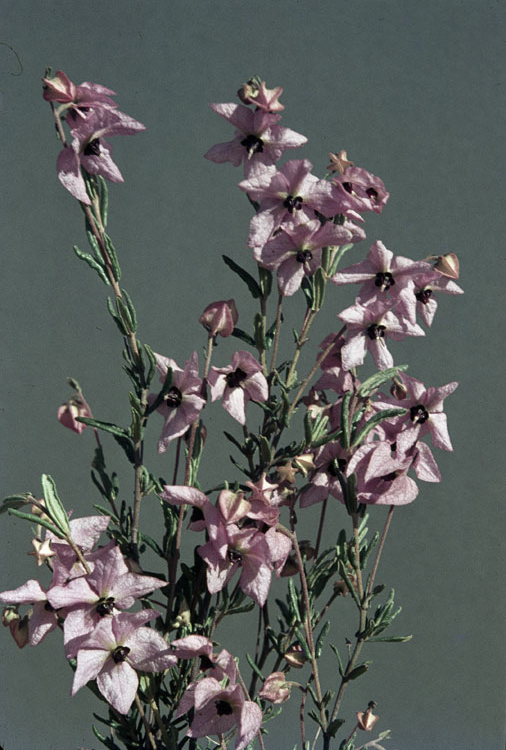
- Near Dandaragan

Scientific classification
- Kingdom: Plantae
- Clade: Tracheophytes
- Clade: Angiosperms
- Clade: Eudicots
- Clade: Rosids
- Order: Malvales
- Family: Malvaceae
- Genus: Guichenotia
- Species: G. sarotes

Binomial name
- Guichenotia sarotes Benth.

Synonyms
- Guichenotia sarotes subsp. immixta Paczk. & A.R.Chapm. nom. inval.; Sarotes ledifolia Lindl.; Sarotes ledifolia var. latifolia Steetz; Sarotes ledifolia Lindl. var. ledifolia; Thomasia pumila Steud.

= Guichenotia sarotes =

Species of flowering plant

Guichenotia sarotes is a species of flowering plant in the family Malvaceae and is endemic to the southwest of Western Australia. It is a spindly, low-growing shrub with densely hairy new growth, hairy, greyish, linear leaves and pink to purple flowers arranged in loose groups of two to six.

== Description ==
Guichenotia sarotes is a spindly, low-growing shrub that typically grows to 0.3–1 m (1 ft 0 in – 3 ft 3 in) high and 0.3–0.6 mm (0.012–0.024 in) wide, its new growth densely covered with star-shaped hairs. Its leaves are greyish, linear to lance-shaped, 7–30 mm (0.28–1.18 in) long, 2–5 mm (0.079–0.197 in) wide and sessile with narrowly egg-shaped stipules 6–14 mm (0.24–0.55 in) long at the base of the leaves. The edges of the leaves are rolled under and both surfaces are covered with white, star-shaped hairs. The flowers are blue-mauve, pink, or white and arranged in cymes of two to six on a peduncle 10–50 mm (0.39–1.97 in) long, each flower on a pedicel 3–8 mm (0.12–0.31 in) long with an egg-shaped bracteole at the base. The five petal-like sepals are 10–20 mm (0.39–0.79 in) long and hairy, and there are tiny, dark red petals but no staminodes. Flowering occurs from July to November.

== Taxonomy and naming ==
Guichenotia sarotes was first formally described in 1863 by George Bentham and the description was published in Flora Australiensis. The specific epithet (sarotes) means "broom-like".

== Distribution and habitat ==
This guichenotia is an undershrub that grows in a variety of soils, including sand, clay, gravel, on sloping sand plains, low hills, ridges and near salt lakes. It is found between the Hutt River, Lake King and Newdegate on the eastern side of the Darling Range in the Avon Wheatbelt, Coolgardie, Geraldton Sandplains, Jarrah Forest, Mallee and Swan Coastal Plain bioregions of south-western Western Australia.
