= Guichenotia tuberculata =

Conservation status
- Priority Three — Poorly Known Taxa (DEC)

Scientific classification
- Kingdom: Plantae
- Clade: Tracheophytes
- Clade: Angiosperms
- Clade: Eudicots
- Clade: Rosids
- Order: Malvales
- Family: Malvaceae
- Genus: Guichenotia
- Species: G. tuberculata

Binomial name
- Guichenotia tuberculata C.F.Wilkins

Species of flowering plant

Guichenotia tuberculata is a species of flowering plant in the family Malvaceae and is endemic to the south-west of Western Australia. It is a low, spreading shrub with linear to narrowly egg-shaped leaves and dark pink flowers arranged in groups of two to five.

== Description ==
Guichenotia tuberculata is a spreading shrub that typically grows to 30–60 cm (12–24 in) high and wide, its new growth densely covered with white, star-shaped hairs. The leaves are linear to narrowly egg-shaped, 8–25 mm (0.31–0.98 in) long and 2–4 mm (0.079–0.157 in) wide on a petiole up to 1 mm (0.039 in) long with narrowly elliptic stipules 7–9 mm (0.28–0.35 in) long at the base. The edges of the leaves are rolled under, and both surfaces are densely covered with white, star-shaped hairs. The flowers are 25 mm (0.98 in) in diameter in cymes 30–90 mm (1.2–3.5 in) long, with an egg-shaped bract 3–7 mm (0.12–0.28 in) long at the base of the pedicel that is 6–10 mm (0.24–0.39 in) long. There are egg-shaped bracteoles 2–6 mm (0.079–0.236 in) long at the base of a peduncle 12–25 mm (0.47–0.98 in) long. The petal-like sepals are dark pink and covered with white, star-shaped hairs, and there are tiny, dark red petals but no staminodes. Flowering occurs from August to October.

== Taxonomy and naming ==
Guichenotia tuberculata was first formally described in 2003 by Carolyn F. Wilkins and the description was published in Australian Systematic Botany from specimens collected near Gillingarra in 1995. The specific epithet (tuberculata) means "covered with small, warty lumps", referring to the ovary.

== Distribution and habitat ==
This species of guichenotia grows in heath and open woodland and is found in scattered roadside remnant populations near Mogumber, New Norcia and Watheroo in the Avon Wheatbelt, Jarrah Forest and Swan Coastal Plain bioregions in the south-west of Western Australia.

== Conservation status ==
Guichenotia tuberculata is listed as "Priority Three" by the Government of Western Australia Department of Biodiversity, Conservation and Attractions, meaning that it is poorly known and known from only a few locations but is not under imminent threat.
