= Maxwell T. Masters =

English botanist and taxonomist (1833–1907)

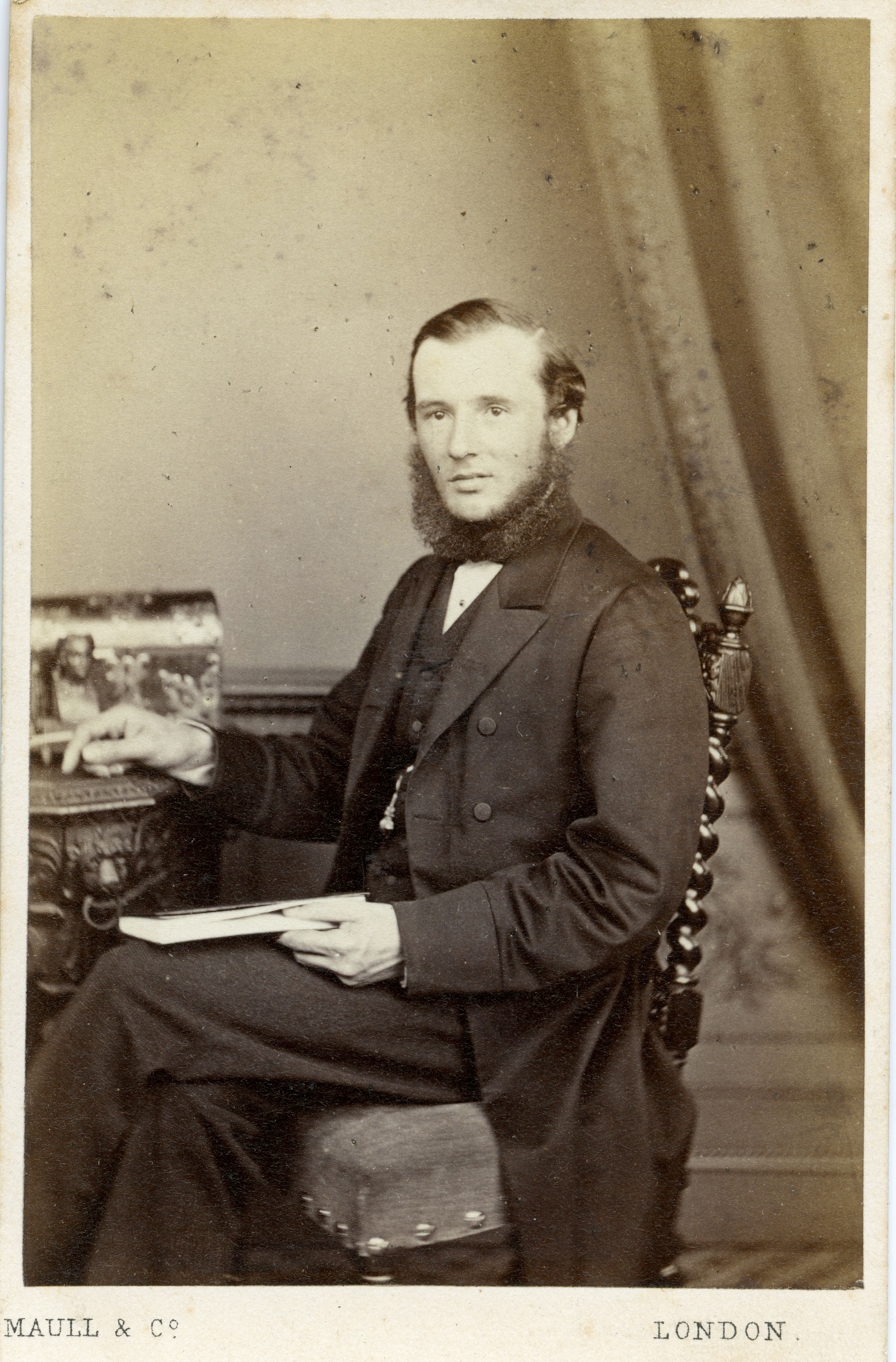
- c. 1870
- Born: Maxwell Tylden Masters; 15 April 1833; United Kingdom
- Died: 30 May 1907 (aged 74); Mount, Ealing, England, United Kingdom
- Occupations: Botanist, taxonomist
- Parent: Wiliam Masters
- Scientific career
- Author abbrev. (botany): Mast.

Maxwell Tylden Masters FRS (15 April 1833 – 30 May 1907) was an English physician and botanist. The genera Maxwellia and Mastersia were named in his honour. The standard author abbreviation Mast. is used to indicate this person as the author when citing a botanical name.

== Life ==
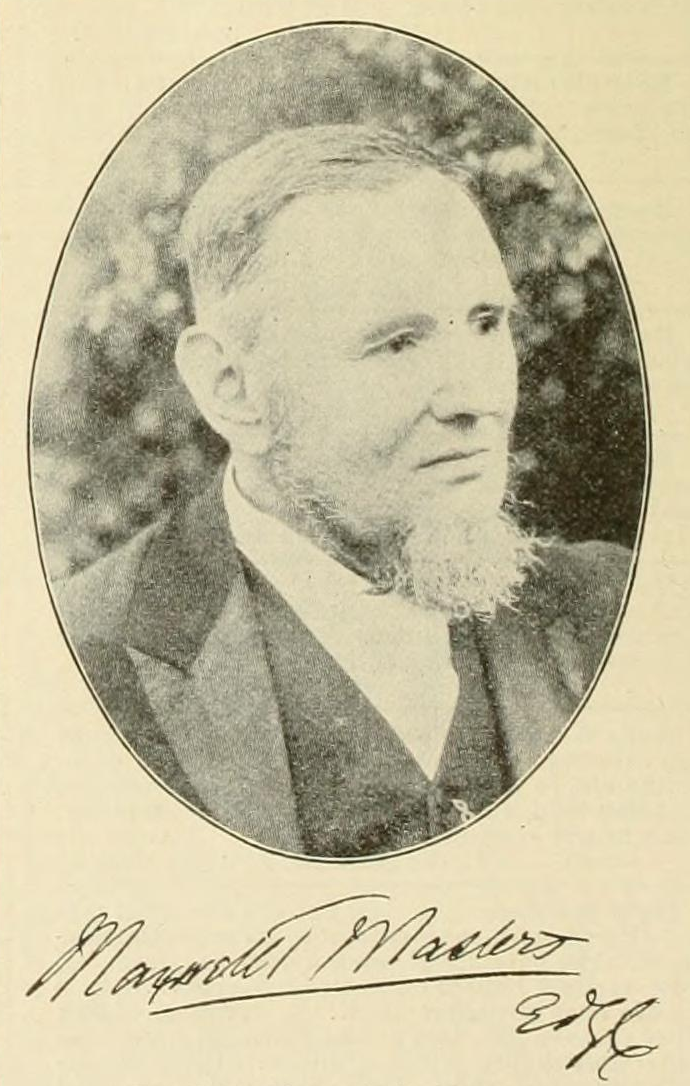

Masters was born in Canterbury, the son of William Masters, nursery man and author of Hortus duroverni. Tylden Masters studied at the King's College London and the University of St Andrews. He attended the lectures of Edward Forbes and John Lindley. After college he became an assistant curator of the Fielding Herbarium in Oxford. He practiced medicine at Peckham around 1856. He gave lectures in botany at St. George's Hospital from 1855 to 1868. He also served as an examiner in botany for the Society of Apothecaries. His most famous works are Vegetable Teratology, which dealt with teratology (abnormal mutations) of vegetable species, and several works on Chinese plants (particularly conifers), describing many of the new species discovered by Ernest Henry Wilson.

The larch Larix mastersiana and the Nepenthes hybrid N. × mastersiana are named after Tylden Masters, among other plant species. The genera Mastersia and Maxwellia from New Caledonia, also bears his name.

Tylden Masters was the editor of the Gardeners' Chronicle between 1866 and 1907, which led to him corresponding with Charles Darwin. He was elected a fellow of the Linnean Society in 1860 and the Royal Society in 1870.

He was made a correspondent of the Institute of France in 1888. He was also a chevalier of the order of Leopold.

Tylden Masters died at the Mount, Ealing, on 30 May 1907. His body was cremated at Woking. His obituary in The American Florist credited him with preventing Kew Gardens "from being handed over to a political clique", with the Royal Horticultural Society (RHS) holding onto its Chiswick Garden, and for preventing "confiscation" of the RHS Lindley Library "in the dark days of the society at South Kensington". His obituary in Nature recites that his most definitive contributions to botany was when he was older and studying Coniferae since he wrote many papers to the Linnean and Horticultural Societies regarding their "structure and taxonomy."

== Family ==
In 1858, Tylden Masters married Ellen, daughter of William Tress, by whom he had four children. His wife and two daughters survived him.

== Books ==
- Vegetable Teratology. London: published for the Ray Society by Robert Hardwicke. 1869.
- Botany for Beginners. London: Bradbury, Evans, & Company. 1972.
- Plant Life. Morton's Handbook of the Farm, No. V (2nd ed.). London: Vinton & Company. 1883.

== Notes ==
- This article incorporates text from a publication now in the public domain: Boulger, George Simonds (1912). "Masters, Maxwell Tylden". In Lee, Sidney (ed.). Dictionary of National Biography (2nd supplement). London: Smith, Elder & Co.
- G. S. Boulger, rev. William T. Stearn. "Masters, Maxwell Tylden (1833–1907)". Oxford Dictionary of National Biography (online ed.). Oxford University Press. doi:10.1093/ref:odnb/34928. (Subscription, Wikipedia Library access or UK public library membership required.)
