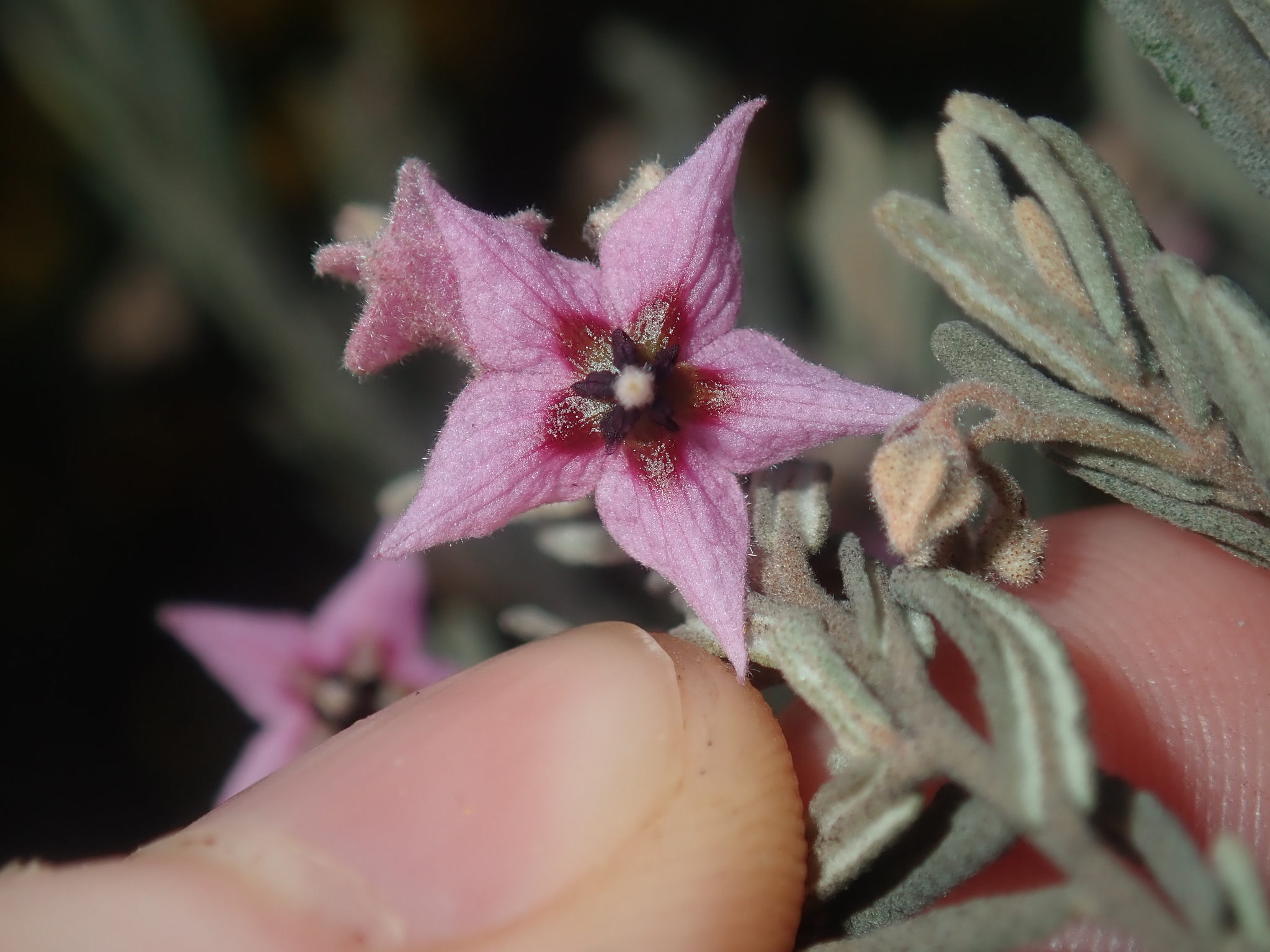

Scientific classification
- Kingdom: Plantae
- Clade: Tracheophytes
- Clade: Angiosperms
- Clade: Eudicots
- Clade: Rosids
- Order: Malvales
- Family: Malvaceae
- Genus: Guichenotia
- Species: G. basiviridis

Binomial name
- Guichenotia basiviridis Wilkins

= Guichenotia basiviridis =

Species of flowering plant

Guichenotia basiviridis is a species of flowering plant in the family Malvaceae and is endemic to the far west of Western Australia. It is an erect, spreading shrub with hairy new growth, linear leaves with the edges rolled under, and pink flowers arranged in groups of three to seven.

== Description ==
Guichenotia basiviridis is an erect, spreading shrub that typically grows up to 1 m (3 ft 3 in) high and 0.5–1 m (1 ft 8 in – 3 ft 3 in) wide, its new growth covered with white, star-shaped hairs. The leaves are linear, 5–15 mm (0.20–0.59 in) long and 1.0–1.5 mm (0.039–0.059 in) wide on a petiole 0.5–2 mm (0.020–0.079 in) long. The edges of the leaves are rolled under, and both surfaces of the leaves are densely covered with white, star-shaped hairs. The flowers are borne in groups of three to seven on a peduncle 5–13 mm (0.20–0.51 in) long, each flower on a curved pedicel 7 mm (0.28 in) long, with linear to narrowly elliptic bracts and bracteoles 1–2 mm (0.039–0.079 in) long at the base. There are five pink, petal-like sepals 6–8 mm (0.24–0.31 in) long, tiny, dark red petals and densely hairy staminodes. Flowering occurs from July to September and the fruit is a papery capsule about 3 mm (0.12 in) in diameter.

== Taxonomy and naming ==
Guichenotia basiviridis was first formally described in 2003 by Carolyn F. Wilkins in Australian Systematic Botany from specimens collected near the North West Coastal Highway, about 15 km (9.3 mi) north of the Murchison River, in 1995. The specific epithet (basiviridis) means "a green base", referring to the sepals.

== Distribution and habitat ==
This species of guichenotia grows in open shrubland and open woodland between Kalbarri and Geraldton in the Avon Wheatbelt, Geraldton Sandplains and Yalgoo bioregions in the west of Western Australia.

== Conservation status ==
Guichenotia basiviridis is listed as "not threatened" by the Western Australian Government Department of Biodiversity, Conservation and Attractions.
