= Guichenotia seorsiflora =

Conservation status
- Declared rare (DEC)

Scientific classification
- Kingdom: Plantae
- Clade: Tracheophytes
- Clade: Angiosperms
- Clade: Eudicots
- Clade: Rosids
- Order: Malvales
- Family: Malvaceae
- Genus: Guichenotia
- Species: G. seorsiflora

Binomial name
- Guichenotia seorsiflora C.F.Wilkins

Species of flowering plant

Guichenotia seorsiflora is a species of flowering plant in the family Malvaceae and is endemic to the south-west of Western Australia. It is a low, spreading, multi-stemmed shrub with linear to narrowly egg-shaped leaves and white flowers arranged singly in upper leaf axils.

== Description ==
Guichenotia seorsiflora is a spreading, multistemmed shrub that typically grows to 30–45 cm (12–18 in) high and 30–55 cm (12–22 in) wide, its new growth covered with white, star-shaped hairs. Its leaves are linear to narrowly egg-shaped, 8–20 mm (0.31–0.79 in) long and 1–2 mm (0.039–0.079 in) wide on a petiole 1–2 mm (0.039–0.079 in) long with linear to narrowly egg-shaped stipules two-thirds as long as the leaves, at the base. The edges of the leaves are rolled under, and the upper surface is covered with white, star-shaped hairs. The flowers are arranged singly in upper leaf axils with a bract 3–4 mm (0.12–0.16 in) long at the base, the pedicel 12–18 mm (0.47–0.71 in) long, with a bracteoles 1–4 mm (0.039–0.157 in) long at the base, on a peduncle 10–25 mm (0.39–0.98 in) long. The petal-like sepals are pink in the bud stage, later white, joined at the base and covered with white, star-shaped hairs. There are tiny, dark red petals but no staminodes. Flowering occurs from July to September.

== Taxonomy and naming ==
Guichenotia seorsiflora was first formally described in 2003 by Carolyn F. Wilkins and the description was published in Australian Systematic Botany. The specific epithet (seorsiflora) means "separate-flowered", referring to the flowers arranged singly.

== Distribution and habitat ==
This species of guichenotia usually grows on breakaways in heath and open woodland in scattered locations near Youndegin, Corrigin and Kellerberrin in the Avon Wheatbelt bioregion in the south-west of Western Australia.

== Conservation status ==
Guichenotia seorsiflora is listed as "Threatened" by the Western Australian Government Department of Biodiversity, Conservation and Attractions, meaning that it is in danger of extinction.
