= Lysiosepalum hexandrum =

Scientific classification
- Kingdom: Plantae
- Clade: Tracheophytes
- Clade: Angiosperms
- Clade: Eudicots
- Clade: Rosids
- Order: Malvales
- Family: Malvaceae
- Genus: Lysiosepalum
- Species: L. hexandrum

Binomial name
- Lysiosepalum hexandrum (S.Moore) S.Moore

Synonyms
- Thomasia hexandra S.Moore

Species of flowering plant

Lysiosepalum hexandrum is a species of flowering plant in the family Malvaceae and is endemic to the south-west of Western Australia. It is dense, erect shrub with its young branches covered with woolly, star-shaped hairs, and has linear or narrowly elliptic leaves and blue, purple or pink flowers usually in groups of five.

== Description ==
Lysiosepalum hexandrum is a dense, erect shrub that typically grows to 90 cm (35 in) high and wide, its young branches covered with woolly, star-shaped hairs and scattered red, club-shaped glandular hairs. The leaves are linear to narrowly elliptic, 3–17 mm (0.12–0.67 in) long and 1.3–2.0 mm (0.051–0.079 in) wide on a petiole 0.6–1.5 mm (0.024–0.059 in) long, usually with stipules 0.5–1.0 mm (0.020–0.039 in) long and 1–4 mm (0.039–0.157 in) wide at the base. The flowers are blue, purple or pink, usually borne in groups of five on a peduncle 10–30 mm (0.39–1.18 in) long with spoon-shaped bracts 2–7 mm (0.079–0.276 in) long at the base, each flower on a pedicel 4.0–7.5 mm (0.16–0.30 in) long with egg-shaped bracts 5.5–10 mm (0.22–0.39 in) long and 3–6 mm (0.12–0.24 in) wide at the base of the sepals. The five sepal lobes are narrowly elliptic or narrowly egg-shaped, 6.0–8.5 mm (0.24–0.33 in) long and 2.0–4.5 mm (0.079–0.177 in) wide, and there are no petals. Flowering occurs from August to November.

== Taxonomy ==
This species was first formally described in 1921 by Spencer Le Marchant Moore who gave it the name Thomasia hexandra in the Journal of Botany, British and Foreign from specimens collected near Beverley by Oswald Hewlett Sargent. In 1923, Moore transferred the species to the genus Lysiosepalum as L. hexandrum in a later edition of the same journal. The specific epithet (hexandrum) means "six stamens".

== Distribution and habitat ==
This species of lysiosepalum grows in the understorey of open woodland or heath between Wongan Hills and Nyabing in the Avon Wheatbelt and Mallee bioregions in the south-west of Western Australia.

== Conservation status ==
Lysiosepalum aromaticum is listed as "not threatened" by the Western Australian Government Department of Biodiversity, Conservation and Attractions.
