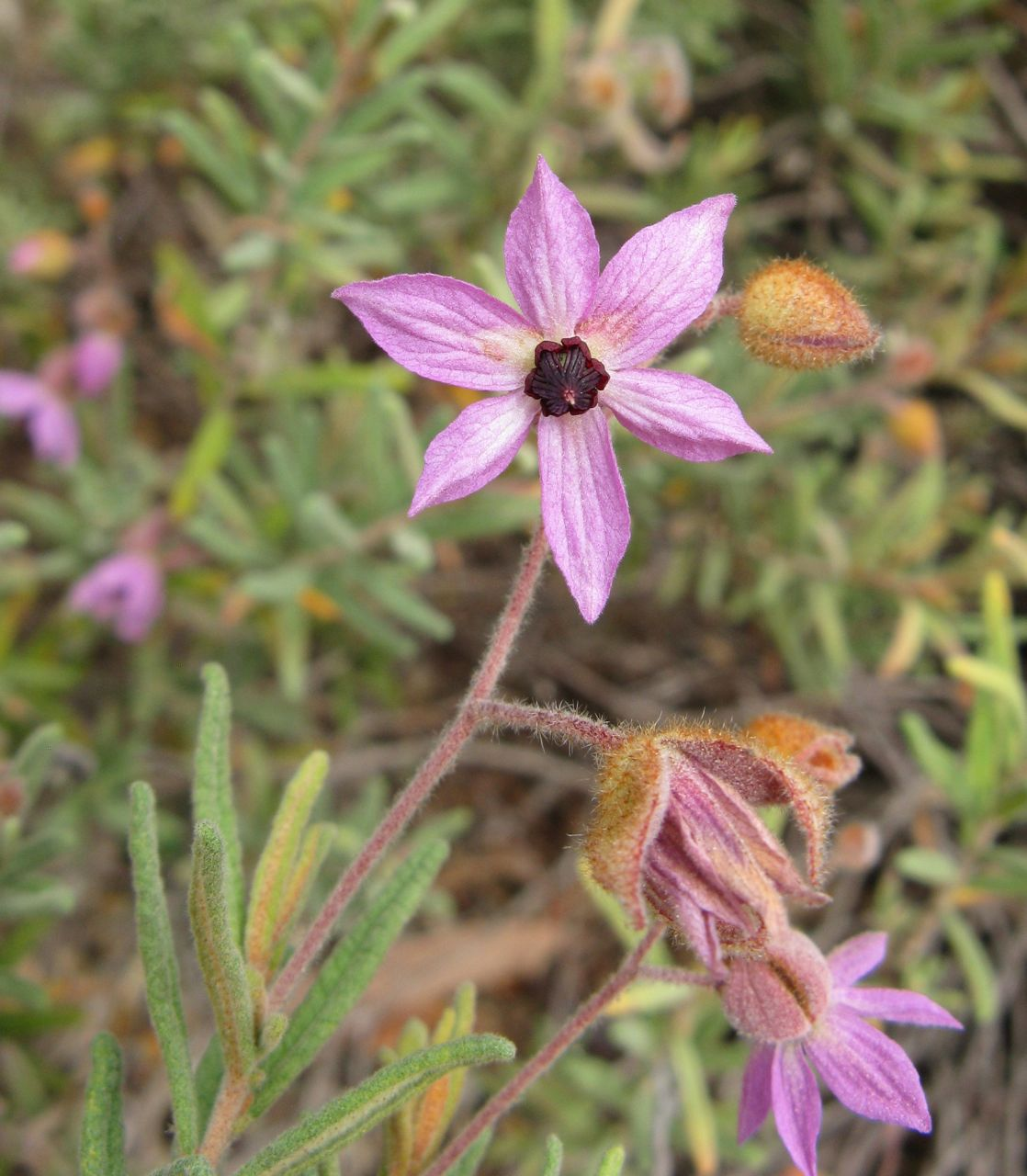
- In the Australian National Botanic Gardens

Scientific classification
- Kingdom: Plantae
- Clade: Tracheophytes
- Clade: Angiosperms
- Clade: Eudicots
- Clade: Rosids
- Order: Malvales
- Family: Malvaceae
- Genus: Lysiosepalum
- Species: L. involucratum

Binomial name
- Lysiosepalum involucratum (Turcz.) Druce

Synonyms
- Lyriosepalum barryanum F.Muell. orth. var.; Lysiosepalum barryanum F.Muell.; Lysiosepalum involucratum (Turcz.) Gardner isonym; Thomasia involucrata Turcz.

= Lysiosepalum involucratum =

Species of shrub

Lysiosepalum involucratum is a species of flowering plant in the family Malvaceae and is endemic to the south-west of Western Australia. It is dense, compact or spreading shrub with its young branches covered with woolly, star-shaped hairs, and has narrowly egg-shaped leaves and purple flowers usually in groups of 2 to 6.

== Description ==
Lysiosepalum involucratum is a dense, compact or spreading shrub that typically grows to 0.3–1.5 m (1 ft 0 in – 4 ft 11 in) high and wide, its young branches covered with woolly, star-shaped hairs. The leaves are narrowly egg-shaped, 8–15 mm (0.31–0.59 in) long and 1–2 mm (0.039–0.079 in) wide on a petiole 0.5–1.0 mm (0.020–0.039 in) long, sometimes with stipules 0.6–1.3 mm (0.024–0.051 in) long and 0.5–1.3 mm (0.020–0.051 in) wide at the base. The flowers are purple, usually borne in groups of 2 to 6 on a peduncle 10–20 mm (0.39–0.79 in) long with spoon-shaped bracts 2–7 mm (0.079–0.276 in) long at the base, each flower on a pedicel 4.0–7.5 mm (0.16–0.30 in) long with linear to egg-shaped bracts 2–6 mm (0.079–0.236 in) long and hairy bracteoles 7–9 mm (0.28–0.35 in) wide at the base of the sepals. The six sepal lobes are narrowly egg-shaped, 6.5–10 mm (0.26–0.39 in) long and 2.5–5.0 mm (0.098–0.197 in) wide, and there are usually tiny, dark red petals. Flowering occurs from August to November and the fruit is about 5 mm (0.20 in) long and 4.5 mm (0.18 in) wide.

== Taxonomy ==
This species was first formally described in 1852 by Nikolai Turczaninow who gave it the name Thomasia involucrata in the Bulletin de la Société Impériale des Naturalistes de Moscou from specimens collected by James Drummond. The species was transferred to the genus Lysiosepalum in 1917 by English botanist George Claridge Druce. The specific epithet (involucratum) means "having bracts surrounding the base of the flowers".

== Distribution and habitat ==
This species of lysiosepalum usually grows in sandy and gravelly soils in the heath and woodland between Chiddarcooping, the Pallinup River and Gnowangerup in the Avon Wheatbelt, Esperance Plains and Mallee bioregions in the south-west of Western Australia.

== Conservation status ==
Lysiosepalum involucratum is listed as "not threatened" by the Western Australian Government Department of Biodiversity, Conservation and Attractions.

== Cultivation ==
This species prefers a sunny or partially shaded position in well-drained soil. Established plants tolerate dry periods The most common method of propagation is from cuttings of semi-mature new growth. Although plants may be propagated from seed, it is difficult to obtain.
