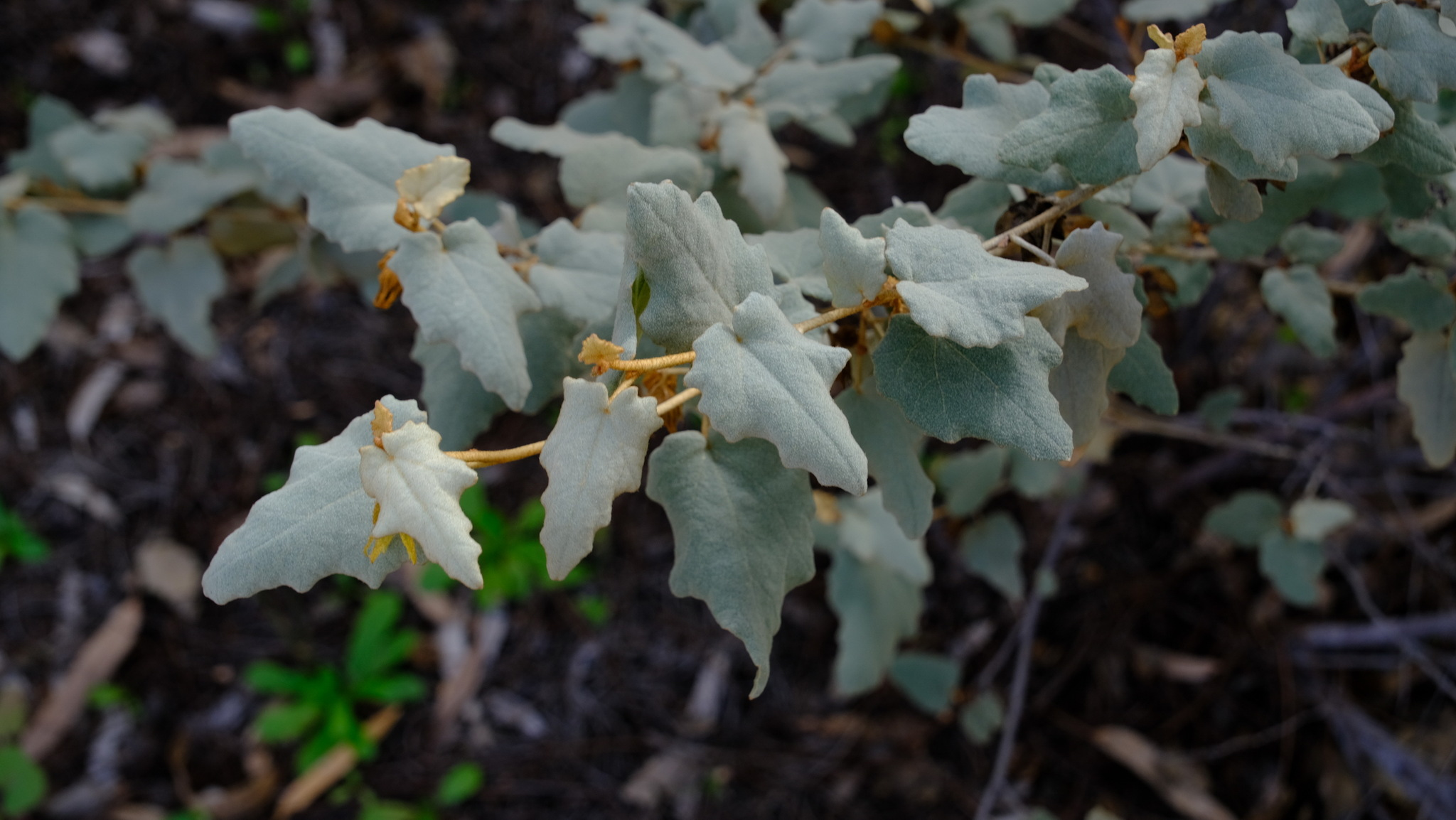
- Hannafordia quadrivalvis

Scientific classification
- Kingdom: Plantae
- Clade: Tracheophytes
- Clade: Angiosperms
- Clade: Eudicots
- Clade: Rosids
- Order: Malvales
- Family: Malvaceae
- Subfamily: Byttnerioideae
- Tribe: Lasiopetaleae
- Genus: Hannafordia; F.Muell.

Species
- See text

= Hannafordia =

Genus of flowering plants

Hannafordia is a genus of flowering plants native to Australia

== Species ==
The following species are recognised in the genus Hannafordia:

- Hannafordia bissillii F.Muell. – grey felt-bush
- Hannafordia quadrivalvis F.Muell.
- Hannafordia shanesii F.Muell.
