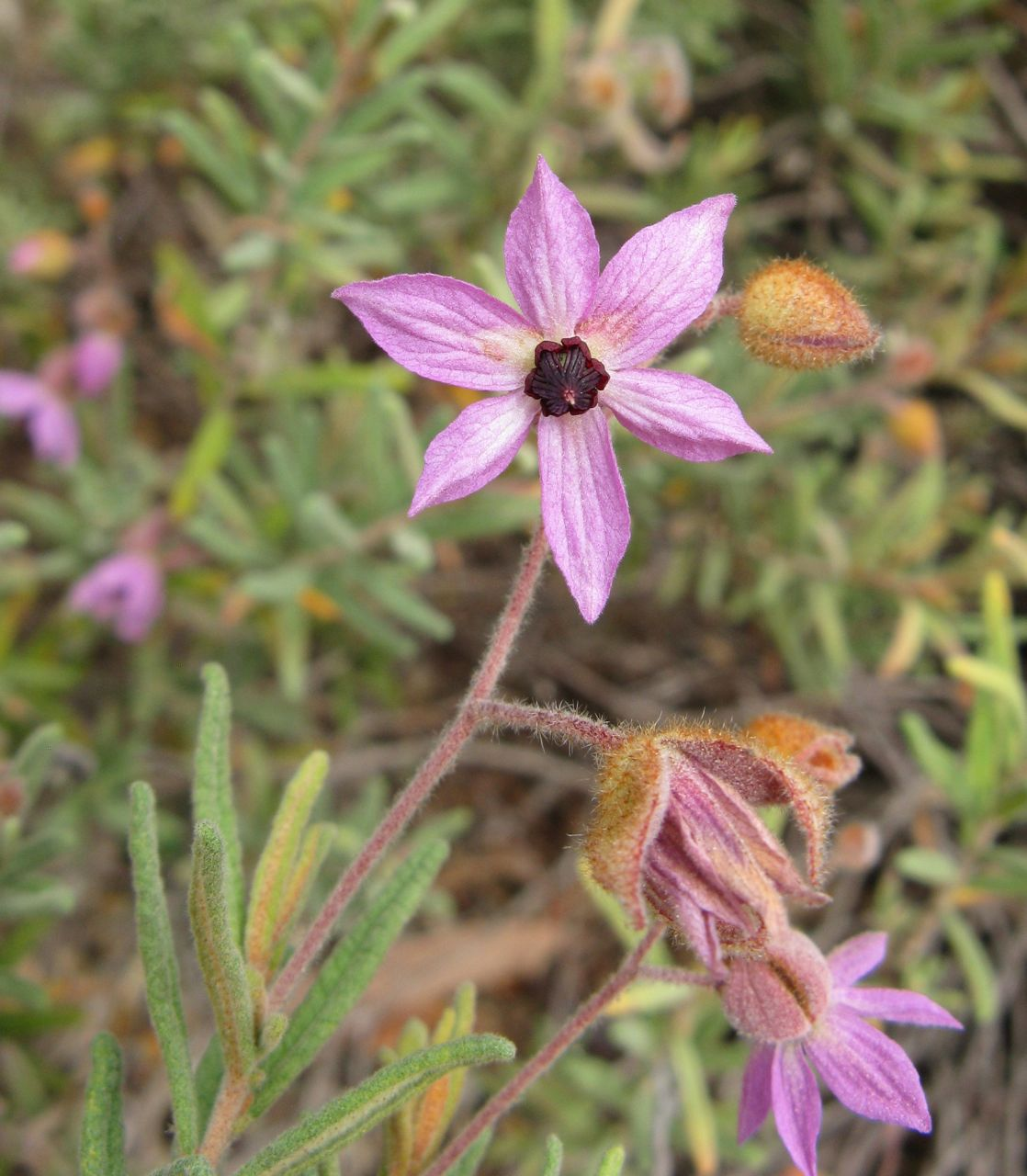
- Lysiosepalum involucratum

Scientific classification
- Kingdom: Plantae
- Clade: Tracheophytes
- Clade: Angiosperms
- Clade: Eudicots
- Clade: Rosids
- Order: Malvales
- Family: Malvaceae
- Subfamily: Byttnerioideae
- Tribe: Lasiopetaleae
- Genus: Lysiosepalum; F.Muell.

Species
- See text

= Lysiosepalum =

Genus of mallow plants

Lysiosepalum is a genus of 5 species of flowering plants in the genus of plants in the family Malvaceae, all endemic to the south-west of Western Australia.

== Description ==
All species of Lysiosepalum are shrubs up to 1.5 m (4 ft 11 in) high. The leaves are mostly linear to egg-shaped with 2 leaf-like stipules at the base of the petiole. There are petal-like sepals alternating between broad to narrow, and tiny, scale-like petals. Three egg-shaped or lance-shaped bracteoles are below the sepals, bracts at the base of the pedicels, the stamens are joined at the base and there are tiny staminodes.

== Taxonomy ==
The genus Lysiosepalum was first formally described in 1858 by Ferdinand von Mueller in his Fragmenta Phytographiae Australiae, and the first species he described (the type species) was Lysiosepalum barryanum. The genus name means a "setting-free sepal", referring to the sepals, which are almost free or separated.

=== Species list ===
The following is a list of names of Lysiosepalum species accepted by the Australian Plant Census as at April 2022:

- Lysiosepalum abollatum C.F.Wilkins - woolly lysiosepalum
- Lysiosepalum aromaticum C.F.Wilkins
- Lysiosepalum hexandrum (S.Moore) S.Moore
- Lysiosepalum involucratum (Turcz.) Druce
- Lysiosepalum rugosum Benth. - wrinkled-leaf lysiosepalum

== Distribution and habitat ==
Species of Lysiosepalum occur in open woodland or shrubland between Yuna and Ravensthorpe in the south-west of Western Australia.
