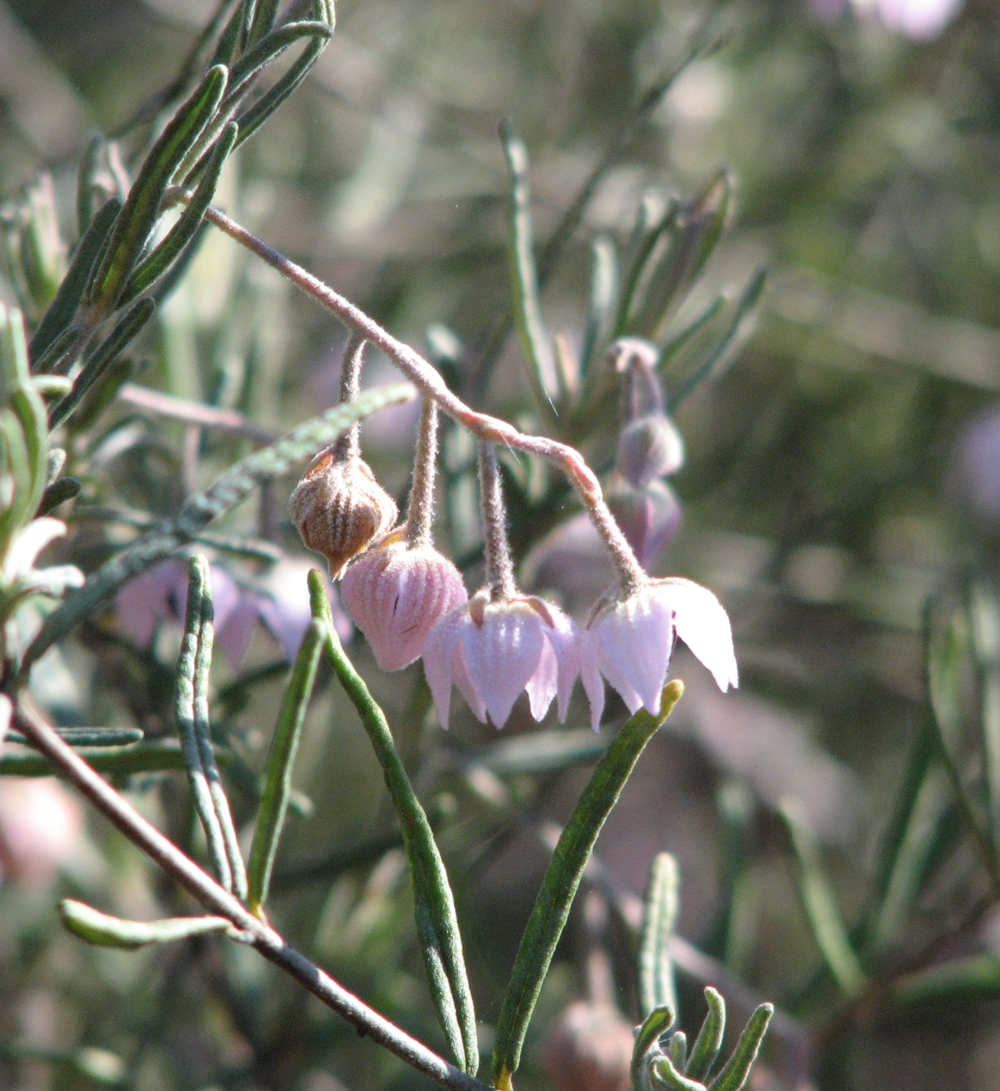
- Guichenotia ledifolia

Scientific classification
- Kingdom: Plantae
- Clade: Tracheophytes
- Clade: Angiosperms
- Clade: Eudicots
- Clade: Rosids
- Order: Malvales
- Family: Malvaceae
- Subfamily: Byttnerioideae
- Tribe: Lasiopetaleae
- Genus: Guichenotia; J.Gay

Synonyms
- Ditomostrophe Turcz.; Sarotes Lindl.

= Guichenotia =

Genus of flowering plants

Guichenotia is a genus of 17 species of flowering plants in the family Malvaceae that is endemic to the south west of Western Australia. Plants in the genus Guichenotia are shrubs with simple, linear to oblong leaves with leaf-like stipules at the base of the petiole, the flowers bisexual with three bracteoles at the base of the sepals, and five petal-like sepals, the petals sometimes absent. The fruit is a capsule usually containing 15 seeds.

The genus was first formally described in 1821 by Jaques Étienne Gay in Mémoires du Muséum d'Histoire Naturelle. The first species Gay described was Guichenotia ledifolia. The genus name honours Antoine Guichenot, gardener's boy on the 1801–1803 French scientific voyage to Australia under Nicolas Baudin.

== Species list ==
The following species of Guichenotia are accepted by the Australian Plant Census as at 22 March 2022:

- Guichenotia alba Keighery
- Guichenotia angustifolia (Turcz.) Druce
- Guichenotia anota C.F.Wilkins
- Guichenotia apetala A.S.George
- Guichenotia asteriskos C.F.Wilkins
- Guichenotia astropletha C.F.Wilkins
- Guichenotia basiviridis C.F.Wilkins
- Guichenotia glandulosa C.F.Wilkins
- Guichenotia impudica C.F.Wilkins
- Guichenotia intermedia C.F.Wilkins
- Guichenotia ledifolia J.Gay
- Guichenotia macrantha Turcz. - large-flowered guichenotia
- Guichenotia micrantha (Steetz) Benth. - small flowered guichenotia
- Guichenotia quasicalva C.F.Wilkins
- Guichenotia sarotes Benth.
- Guichenotia seorsiflora C.F.Wilkins
- Guichenotia tuberculata C.F.Wilkins
