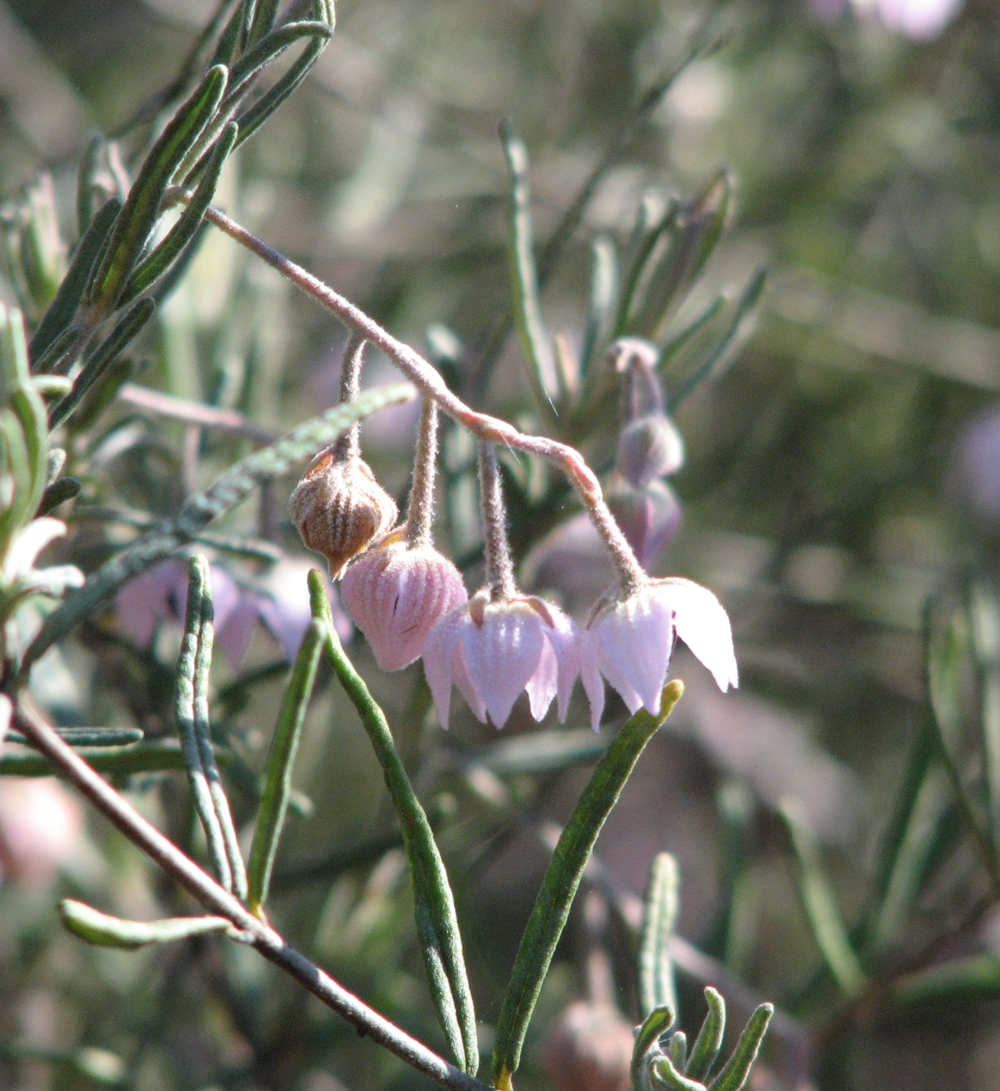

Scientific classification
- Kingdom: Plantae
- Clade: Tracheophytes
- Clade: Angiosperms
- Clade: Eudicots
- Clade: Rosids
- Order: Malvales
- Family: Malvaceae
- Genus: Guichenotia
- Species: G. ledifolia

Binomial name
- Guichenotia ledifolia J.Gay

= Guichenotia ledifolia =

Species of flowering plant

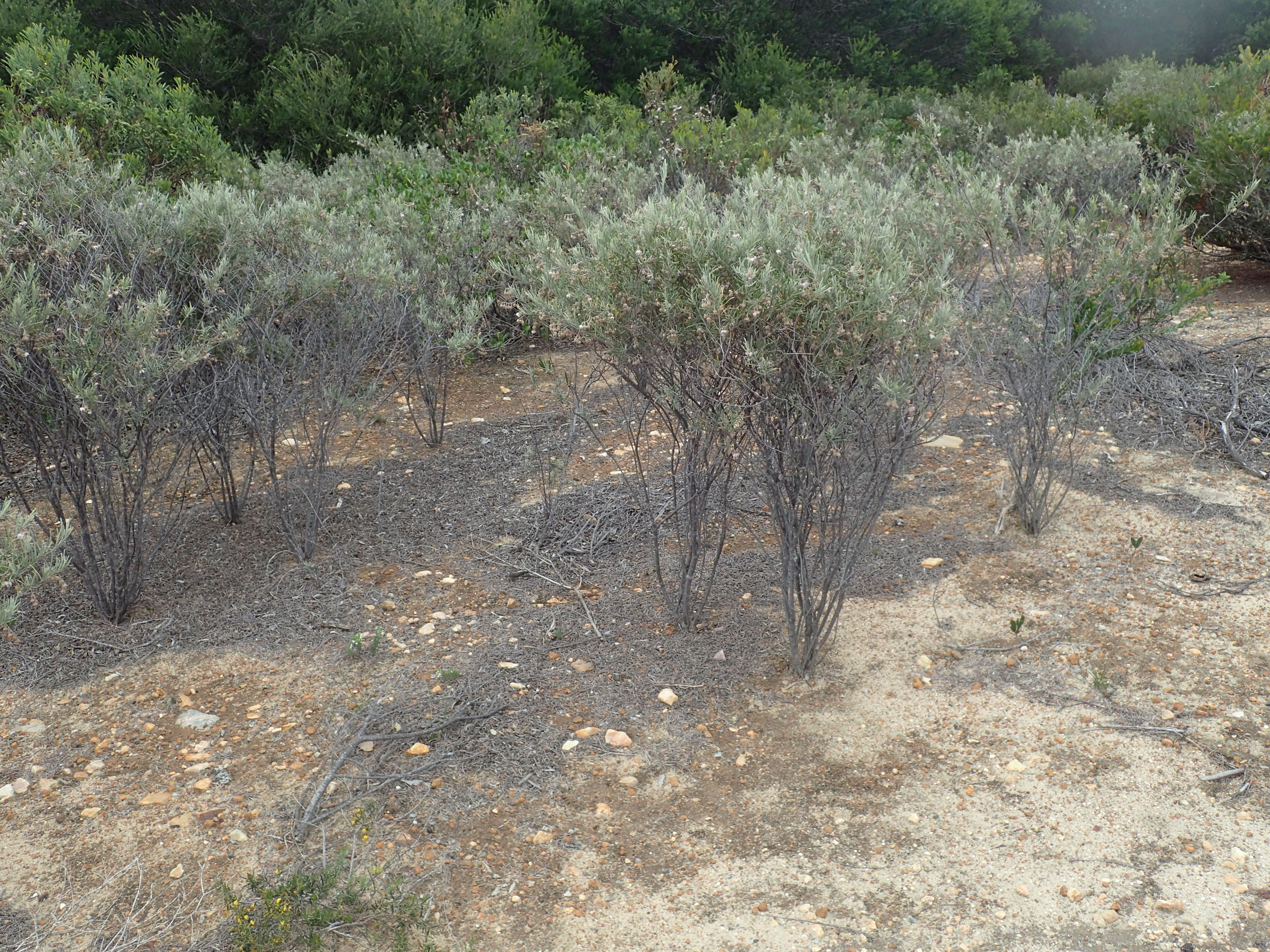
Habit near the entrance to the Fitzgerald River National Park

Guichenotia ledifolia is a species of flowering plant in the family Malvaceae and is endemic to the southwest of Western Australia. It is a densely-branched shrub with densely hairy new growth, hairy, linear to oblong leaves and pink to mauve flowers arranged in groups of three to ten.

== Description ==
Guichenotia ledifolia is a densely-branched shrub that typically grows to 0.5–2 m (1 ft 8 in – 6 ft 7 in) high and 1.0–1.5 m (3 ft 3 in – 4 ft 11 in) wide, its new growth densely covered with white, star-shaped hairs. The leaves are linear to oblong, 15–60 mm (0.59–2.36 in) long and 2–5 mm (0.079–0.197 in) wide on a short petiole with leaf-like stipules 10–20 mm (0.39–0.79 in) long at the base. The edges of the leaves are rolled under, and both surfaces of the leaves are densely covered with star-shaped hairs. The flowers are borne in cymes of three to ten on a peduncle up to 30 mm (1.2 in) long, each flower on a pedicel up to 10 mm (0.39 in) long with bracts 5 mm (0.20 in) long but that fall off as the flowers open. The five pink to mauve, petal-like sepals are 6–14 mm (0.24–0.55 in) long and densely hairy, and there are tiny, deep red petals but no staminodes. Flowering occurs from July to November.

== Taxonomy ==
Guichenotia ledifolia was formally described in 1821 by Swiss-French botanist Jaques Étienne Gay in the journal Mémoires du Muséum d'Histoire Naturelle. The specific epithet (ledifolia) means Ledum-leaved" or "broomlike".

== Distribution and habitat ==
Guichenotia ledifolia grows in heath, kwongan and woodland on coastal limestone, sandplains and granite rocks in the Avon Wheatbelt, Esperance Plains, Geraldton Sandplains, Hampton, Jarrah Forest, Mallee, Swan Coastal Plain and Yalgoo bioregions of south-western Western Australia.

== Conservation status ==
This species of guichenotia is listed as "not threatened" by the Western Australian Government Department of Biodiversity, Conservation and Attractions.

== Ecology ==
In a 2015 study, researchers suggest that the plant is the favourite food of the quokka, an endemic marsupial in southwestern Australia.

== Use in horticulture ==
This species can be used as a feature plant or as a low screen, barrier or informal hedge in native landscapes. It attracts insects and birds.
