= Guichenotia anota =

Conservation status
- Priority One — Poorly Known Taxa (DEC)

Scientific classification
- Kingdom: Plantae
- Clade: Tracheophytes
- Clade: Angiosperms
- Clade: Eudicots
- Clade: Rosids
- Order: Malvales
- Family: Malvaceae
- Genus: Guichenotia
- Species: G. anota

Binomial name
- Guichenotia anota Wilkins

Species of flowering plant

Guichenotia anota is a flowering plant in the family Malvaceae and is endemic to a restricted part of the southwest of Western Australia. It is a low, erect, compact shrub with hairy new growth, oblong to narrowly egg-shaped leaves, and pinkish-purple flowers.

== Description ==
Guichenotia anota is an erect, compact shrub that typically grows to 10–40 cm (3.9–15.7 in) high and 20–40 cm (7.9–15.7 in) wide, its new growth densely covered with white, star-shaped hairs, the hairs sometimes with a dark centre. The leaves are oblong to narrowly egg-shaped, the narrower end towards the base, 2–8 mm (0.079–0.315 in) long and 2–3 mm (0.079–0.118 in) wide on a petiole 1.0–1.5 mm (0.039–0.059 in) long and lacking stipules. The lower surface of the leaves is densely covered with star-shaped hairs with a dark centre, giving it a scaly appearance. The flowers are borne singly or in groups of three or four, sometime more, on a peduncle 6–8 mm (0.24–0.31 in) long, each flower on a pedicel 1–2 mm (0.039–0.079 in) long, with one or two bracts 2–5 mm (0.079–0.197 in) long and four bracteoles 2–4 mm (0.079–0.157 in) long at the base. The flowers are pendent, about 15 mm (0.59 in) in diameter with pinkish purple, petal-like sepals 5–8 mm (0.20–0.31 in) long and joined for three-quarters of their length. There are no petals or staminodes and the stamens are dark red. Flowering occurs from September to April and the fruit is a capsule 3.5–4.0 mm (0.14–0.16 in) in diameter.

== Taxonomy and naming ==
Guichenotia anota was first formally described in 2009 by Carolyn F. Wilkins and the description was published in the journal Nuytsia from specimens collected near Ravensthorpe in 2003. The specific epithet (anota) means "without an ear", referring to the absence of lobes on the leaves.

== Distribution and habitat ==
This species of guichenotia grows as an undershrub in partly shaded positions, in a restricted area near Ravensthorpe in the Esperance Plains bioregion of south-western Western Australia.

== Conservation status ==
Guichenotia anota is listed as "Priority One" by the Government of Western Australia Department of Biodiversity, Conservation and Attractions, meaning that it is known from only one or a few locations that are potentially at risk.
