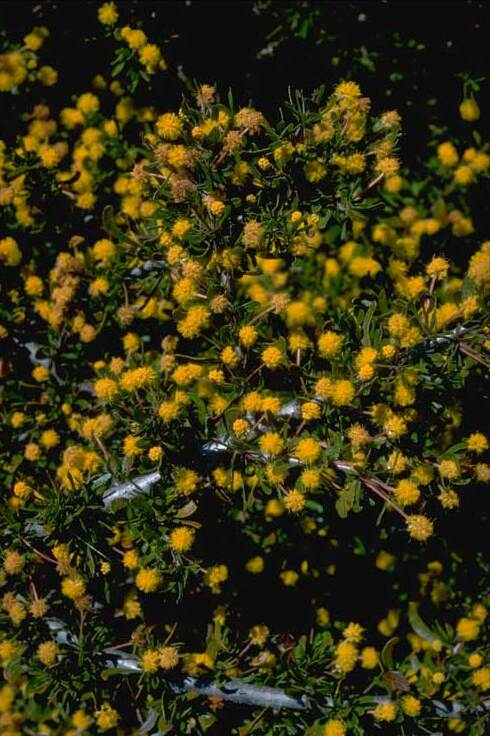

Scientific classification
- Kingdom: Plantae
- Clade: Embryophytes
- Clade: Tracheophytes
- Clade: Angiosperms
- Clade: Eudicots
- Clade: Rosids
- Order: Fabales
- Family: Fabaceae
- Subfamily: Caesalpinioideae
- Clade: Mimosoid clade
- Genus: Acacia
- Species: A. congesta

Binomial name
- Acacia congesta Benth.
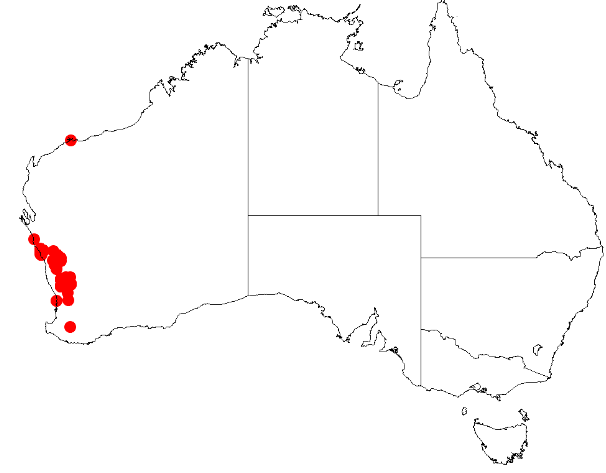
- Occurrence data from AVH

Synonyms
- Acacia collina E.Pritz.; Racosperma congestum (Benth.) Pedley

= Acacia congesta =

Species of legume

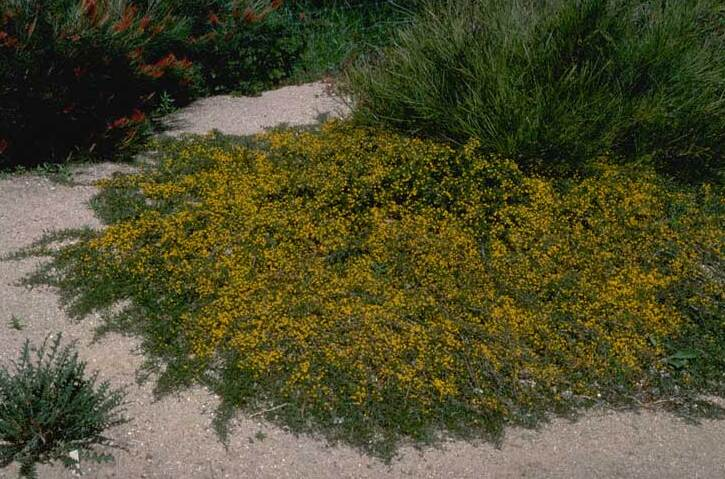
Habit

Acacia congesta is a species of flowering plant in the family Fabaceae and is endemic to the south-west of Western Australia. It is an intricately branched, spreading shrub with dark grey bark, variable phyllodes, spherical to oblong heads of golden yellow flowers and curved to coiled pods somewhat resembling a string of beads.

== Description ==
Acacia congesta is an intricately branched, spreading shrub that typically grows to a height of 0.5–2.5 m (1 ft 8 in – 8 ft 2 in) and has dark grey bark. The phyllodes are variable in size and shaped, with one more or less straight edge and the other edge convex and partly near the branchlet, 5–30 mm (0.20–1.18 in) long and 3–7 mm (0.12–0.28 in) wide with a prominent midrib. The flowers are borne spherical or oblong heads in axils or on the ends of branches in short racemes on peduncles 5–20 mm (0.20–0.79 in) long. Each head contains 30 to 70 golden yellow flowers. Flowering time depends on subspecies, and the pods are thinly leathery firmly papery, brown to yellow, curved or coiled, somewhat resembling a chain of beads, up to 60 mm (2.4 in) long and 4–6 mm (0.16–0.24 in) wide.

== Taxonomy ==
Acacia congesta was first formally described in 1842 by George Bentham in Hooker's London Journal of Botany from specimens collected by James Drummond near the Swan River Colony. The specific epithet (congesta) means 'crowded', referring to the heads of flowers.

In 1999, Bruce Maslin described three subspecies of A. congesta in the journal; Nuytsia, and the names are accepted by the Australian Plant Census:

- Acacia congesta subsp. cliftoniana (W.Fitzg.) Maslin has hairy phyllodes 5–10 mm (0.20–0.39 in) long and heads of 30 to 40 flowers in August and September.
- Acacia congesta Benth. subsp. congesta has mostly glabrous phyllodes 10–30 mm (0.39–1.18 in) long and heads of 35 to 65 flowers in axillary peduncles or in racemes from June to October.
- Acacia congesta subsp. wonganensis Maslin has glabrous phyllodes 5–10 mm (0.20–0.39 in) long and heads of 50 to 60 flowers in August and September.

== Distribution and habitat ==
This species of wattle occurs in a discontinuous distribution from near Geraldton and south to Mogumber and Wongan Hills in the Avon Wheatbelt, Geraldton Sandplains, Jarrah Forest and Swan Coastal Plain bioregions of south-western Western Australia.

- Subspecies cliftoniana grows on rocky or lateritic loam in mallee woodland with open scrub from Yandanooka to Three Springs.
- Subspecies congesta grows in loam and gravel on rocky hills in scrub or heath between Northampton and Geraldton, south-east to Mingenew and Morawa and south to Pithara, Moora and Mogumber.
- Subspecies wonganensis grows in rocky or lateritic clay or loam in mallee and is only known from near Wongan Hills.

== See also ==
- List of Acacia species
