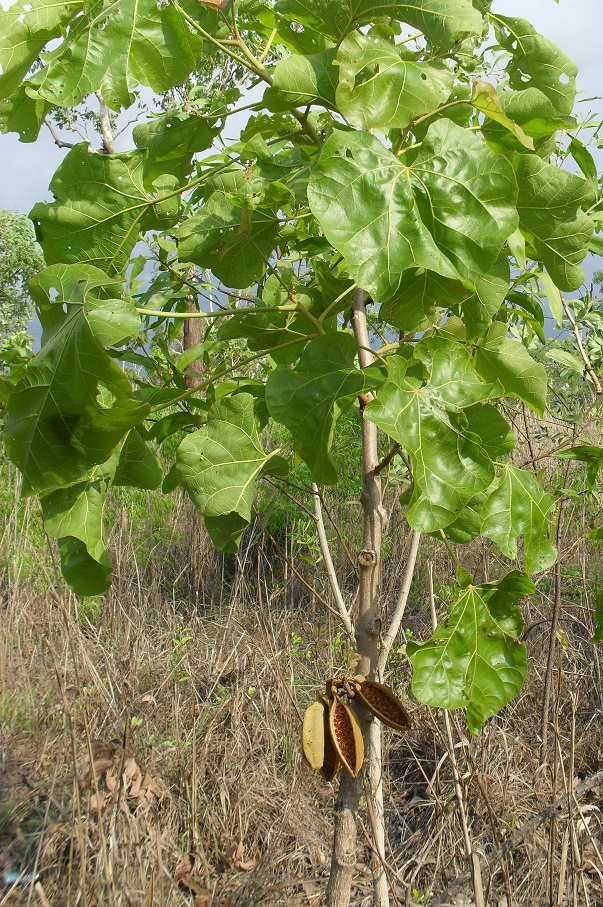
- Habit near Marlow Lagoon, Northern Territory

Scientific classification
- Kingdom: Plantae
- Clade: Tracheophytes
- Clade: Angiosperms
- Clade: Eudicots
- Clade: Rosids
- Order: Malvales
- Family: Malvaceae
- Genus: Brachychiton
- Species: B. megaphyllus

Binomial name
- Brachychiton megaphyllus Guymer

= Brachychiton megaphyllus =

Red-flowering kurrajong

Species of tree

Brachychiton megaphyllus, commonly known as the red-flowering kurrajong, is a tree of the genus Brachychiton (Note: The genus Brachychiton was traditionally placed in the family Sterculiaceae, but that family, along with Bombacaceae and Tiliaceae, has been found to be polyphyletic and is now sunk into a more broadly-defined Malvaceae.) found in northern Australia. It was described in 1988 by Gordon Guymer in his revision of the genus, previously having been considered a variant of Brachychiton paradoxus.

Hybrids with Brachychiton multicaulis have been reported.

== Description ==
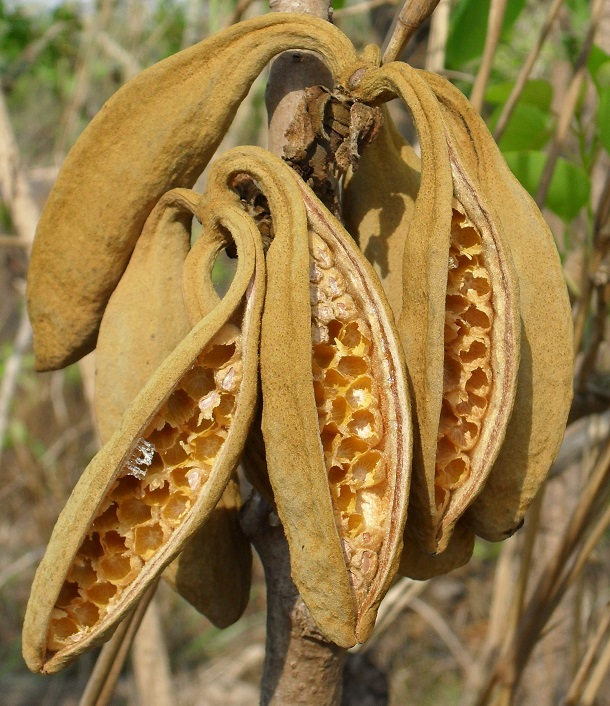
Two folliceta, or eight follicles that developed from two flowers.

Brachychiton megaphyllus grows as a large shrub or small tree, ranging from 2–8 metres (6 ft 7 in – 26 ft 3 in) tall, with a trunk that can be 10 to 25 centimetres (3.9 to 9.8 in) in diameter at breast height. The dark brown bark has vertical furrows and shallow tessellations.

Like those of all members of the genus, the leaves are alternately arranged along the stems. The large leaves are roughly oval or three-lobed, measuring 15–26 cm (5.9–10.2 in) long by 13–24 cm (5.1–9.4 in) wide. The leaf base is cordate (heart-shaped). The plant is deciduous, bare of leaves from June to September.

The orange-red flowers appear from June to October or sometimes November. The yellow-brown woody follicles, or seedpods, mature from September to June. Measuring 6.5–11 cm (2.6–4.3 in) long and 3–4.8 cm (1.2–1.9 in) wide, they split along their length to reveal 25–45 seeds. The seeds, which are ovoid with a smooth surface, and 8–9 mm (0.31–0.35 in) long by 6–7 mm (0.24–0.28 in) wide, are covered by a hairy coating known as the exotesta.

== Native range ==
The species is found in the Northern Territory, north of latitude 17° S. It is a component of open eucalypt woodland, commonly found with Eucalyptus miniata and E. tetrodonta. It generally grows on red soils derived from laterite. Commonly cultivated in the Northern Territory, it was listed as the official emblem of the city of Darwin in 1988.

== Aboriginal uses ==
The Arnhem Land women of Yirrkala, Maningrida, and Gapiwiyak spin thread from the bark of Brachychiton megaphyllus, and use the thread to make necklaces, and bracelets.

The rootstock of young plants can be eaten raw, while fibre from the bark is used to make both rope and string. Stems exude gum which is eaten and can also be used as a paint binder. The seeds are eaten raw or roasted.

According to the speakers of the Ngan’gityemerri language, the flowering of B. megaphyllus marks the time the freshwater crocodiles are laying eggs.
