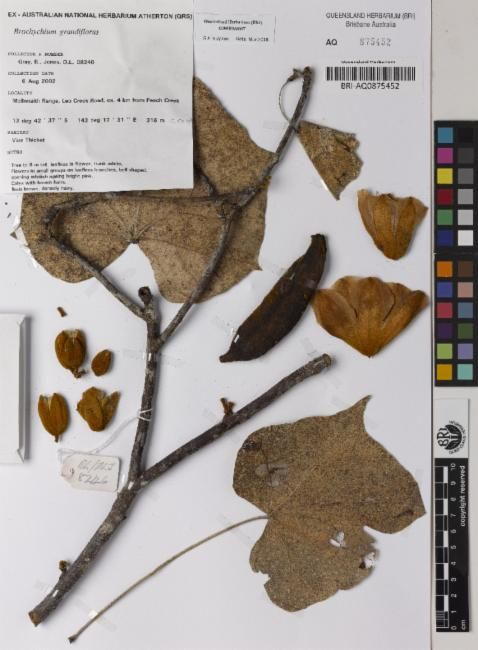
- Specimen BRI AQ0875452 (CC-BY 4.0 Queensland Herbarium)

Scientific classification
- Kingdom: Plantae
- Clade: Tracheophytes
- Clade: Angiosperms
- Clade: Eudicots
- Clade: Rosids
- Order: Malvales
- Family: Malvaceae
- Genus: Brachychiton
- Species: B. grandiflorus

Binomial name
- Brachychiton grandiflorus Guymer

= Brachychiton grandiflorus =

Species of tree

Brachychiton grandiflorus is a tree of the genus Brachychiton (Note: The genus Brachychiton was traditionally placed in the family Sterculiaceae, but that family, along with Bombacaceae and Tiliaceae, has been found to be polyphyletic and is now sunk into a more broadly-defined Malvaceae) native to the Cape York Peninsula in Queensland, Australia. It was first described in 1988 by Gordon Guymer.
