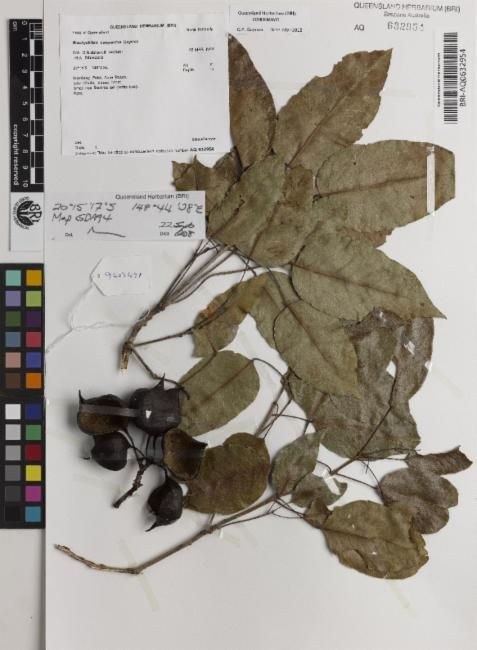
- Specimen BRI AQ0632954 (image CC-BY 4.0 from Queensland Herbarium)

Scientific classification
- Kingdom: Plantae
- Clade: Tracheophytes
- Clade: Angiosperms
- Clade: Eudicots
- Clade: Rosids
- Order: Malvales
- Family: Malvaceae
- Genus: Brachychiton
- Species: B. compactus

Binomial name
- Brachychiton compactus Guymer

= Brachychiton compactus =

Species of tree

Brachychiton compactus is a tree of the genus Brachychiton (Note: The genus Brachychiton was traditionally placed in the family Sterculiaceae, but that family, along with Bombacaceae and Tiliaceae, has been found to be polyphyletic and is now sunk into a more broadly-defined Malvaceae) found in northeastern Australia. It has a very restricted distribution on the central coast of Queensland near Proserpine, and also occurs in a fragmented araucarian vine thicket on Hayman Island.

== Conservation status ==
Brachychiton compactus is listed as of conservation concern, under the category Near Threatened, by the Queensland Government under the Queensland Nature Conservation Act.
