= Brachychiton chrysocarpus =

Scientific classification
- Kingdom: Plantae
- Clade: Tracheophytes
- Clade: Angiosperms
- Clade: Eudicots
- Clade: Rosids
- Order: Malvales
- Family: Malvaceae
- Genus: Brachychiton
- Species: B. chrysocarpus

Binomial name
- Brachychiton chrysocarpus Cowie & Guymer
- Isotype site: Fish River Station, NT'"`UNIQ--ref-00000003-QINU`"'

Species of tree

Brachychiton chrysocarpus is a tree of the genus Brachychiton (Note: The genus Brachychiton was traditionally placed in the family Sterculiaceae, but that family, along with Bombacaceae and Tiliaceae, has been found to be polyphyletic and is now sunk into a more broadly-defined Malvaceae) native to the Northern Territory, Australia. It was first described in 2015 by Ian D. Cowie and Gordon Guymer.
