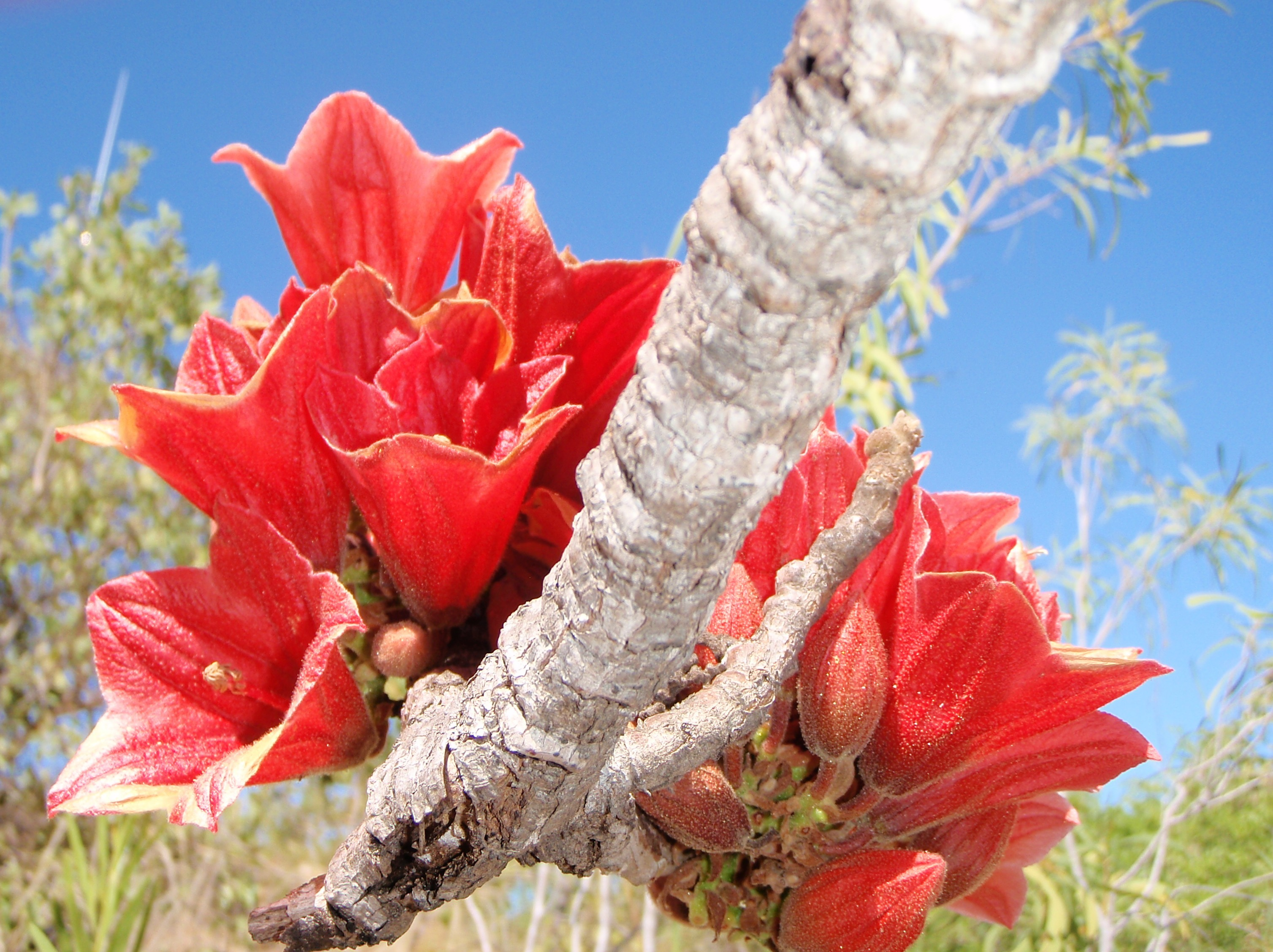

Scientific classification
- Kingdom: Plantae
- Clade: Tracheophytes
- Clade: Angiosperms
- Clade: Eudicots
- Clade: Rosids
- Order: Malvales
- Family: Malvaceae
- Genus: Brachychiton
- Species: B. viscidulus

Binomial name
- Brachychiton viscidulus (W.Fitzg.) Guymer

Synonyms
- Sterculia viscidula W.Fitzg.

= Brachychiton viscidulus =

Species of plant

Brachychiton viscidulus is a plant in the Malvaceae family, native to Western Australia.

It was first described by William Vincent Fitzgerald in 1906 as Sterculia viscidula, but was transferred to the Brachychiton genus in 1989 by Gordon P. Guymer to become Brachychiton viscidulus.

B. viscidulus is a tree with pink-red to orange flowers which grows to heights of 2m to 8m, which flowers from April to January. It grows on clays, on skeletal soils over many different types of rocks, and is found on rocky slopes, gorges scarps.
