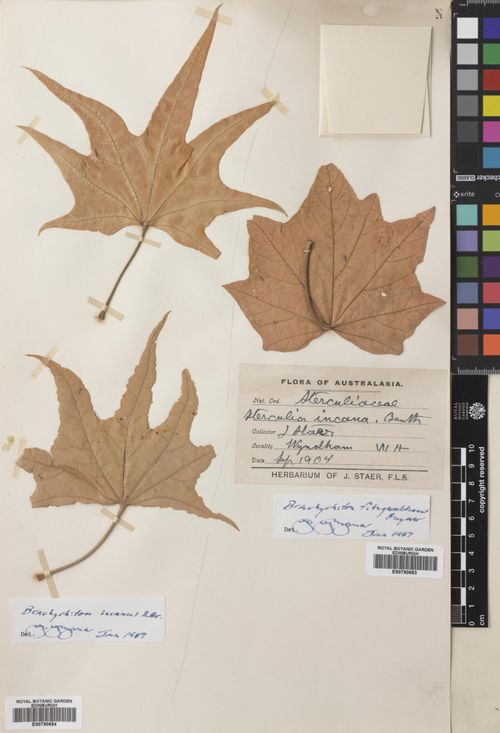
- Specimen E00790653 (image CC-0 from Royal Botanic Garden, Edinburgh)

Scientific classification
- Kingdom: Plantae
- Clade: Tracheophytes
- Clade: Angiosperms
- Clade: Eudicots
- Clade: Rosids
- Order: Malvales
- Family: Malvaceae
- Genus: Brachychiton
- Species: B. fitzgeraldianus

Binomial name
- Brachychiton fitzgeraldianus Guymer

= Brachychiton fitzgeraldianus =

Species of tree

Brachychiton fitzgeraldianus is a tree of the genus Brachychiton (Note: The genus Brachychiton was traditionally placed in the family Sterculiaceae, but that family, along with Bombacaceae and Tiliaceae, has been found to be polyphyletic and is now sunk into a more broadly-defined Malvaceae) found in northwestern Australia. It was described in 1988.
