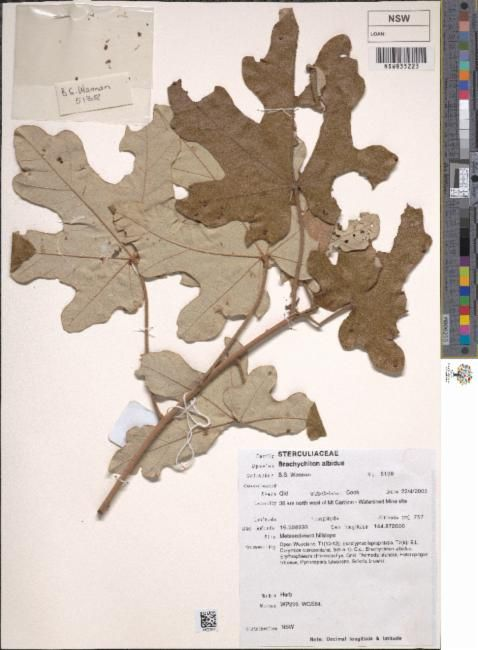
- NSW835223 (image CC-BY 4.0 from National Herbarium of New South Wales)

Scientific classification
- Kingdom: Plantae
- Clade: Tracheophytes
- Clade: Angiosperms
- Clade: Eudicots
- Clade: Rosids
- Order: Malvales
- Family: Malvaceae
- Genus: Brachychiton
- Species: B. albidus

Binomial name
- Brachychiton albidus Guymer

= Brachychiton albidus =

Species of tree

Brachychiton albidus is a tree of the genus Brachychiton (Note: The genus Brachychiton was traditionally placed in the family Sterculiaceae, but that family, along with Bombacaceae and Tiliaceae, has been found to be polyphyletic and is now sunk into a more broadly-defined Malvaceae) native to Queensland, Australia. It was described in 1988.
