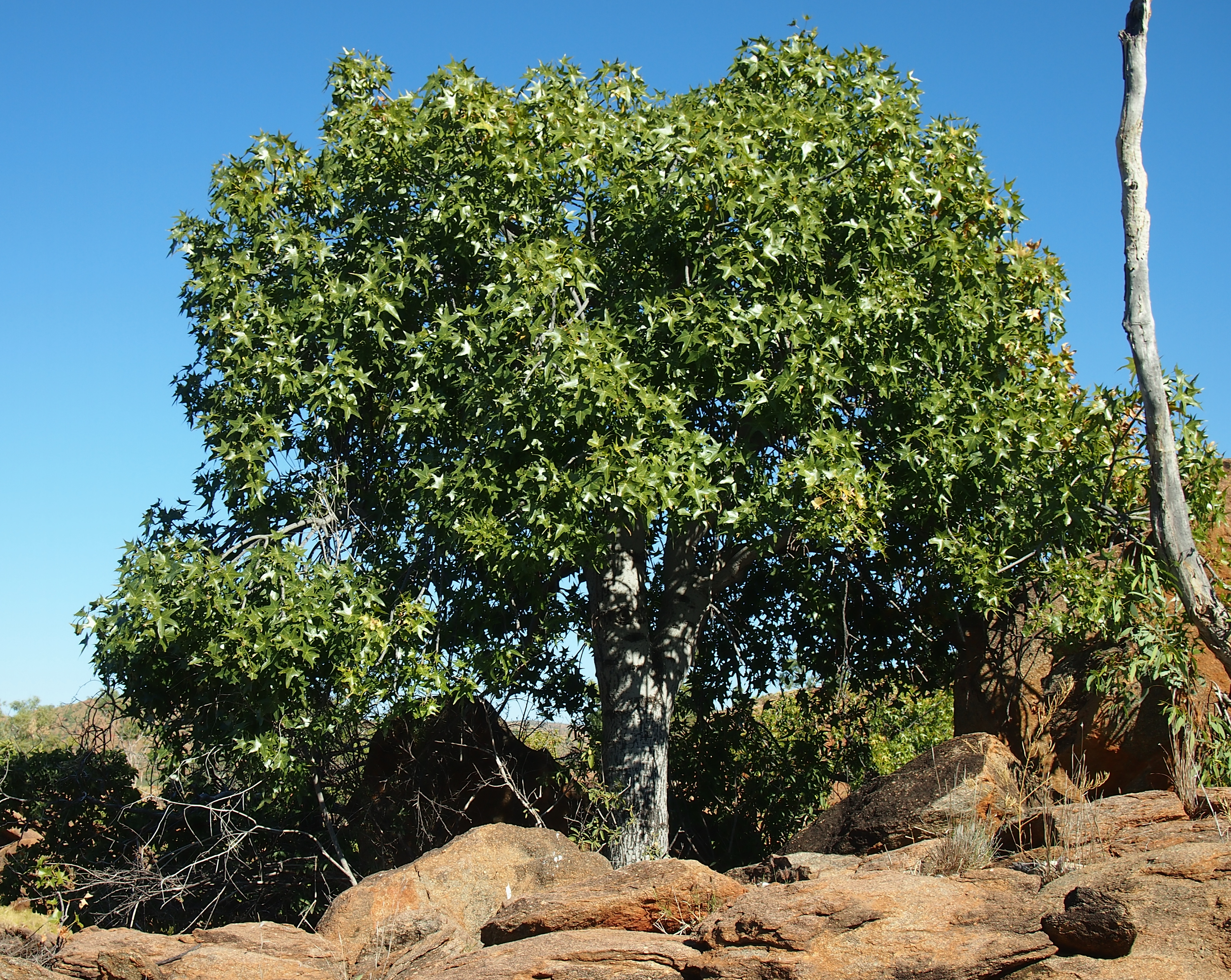

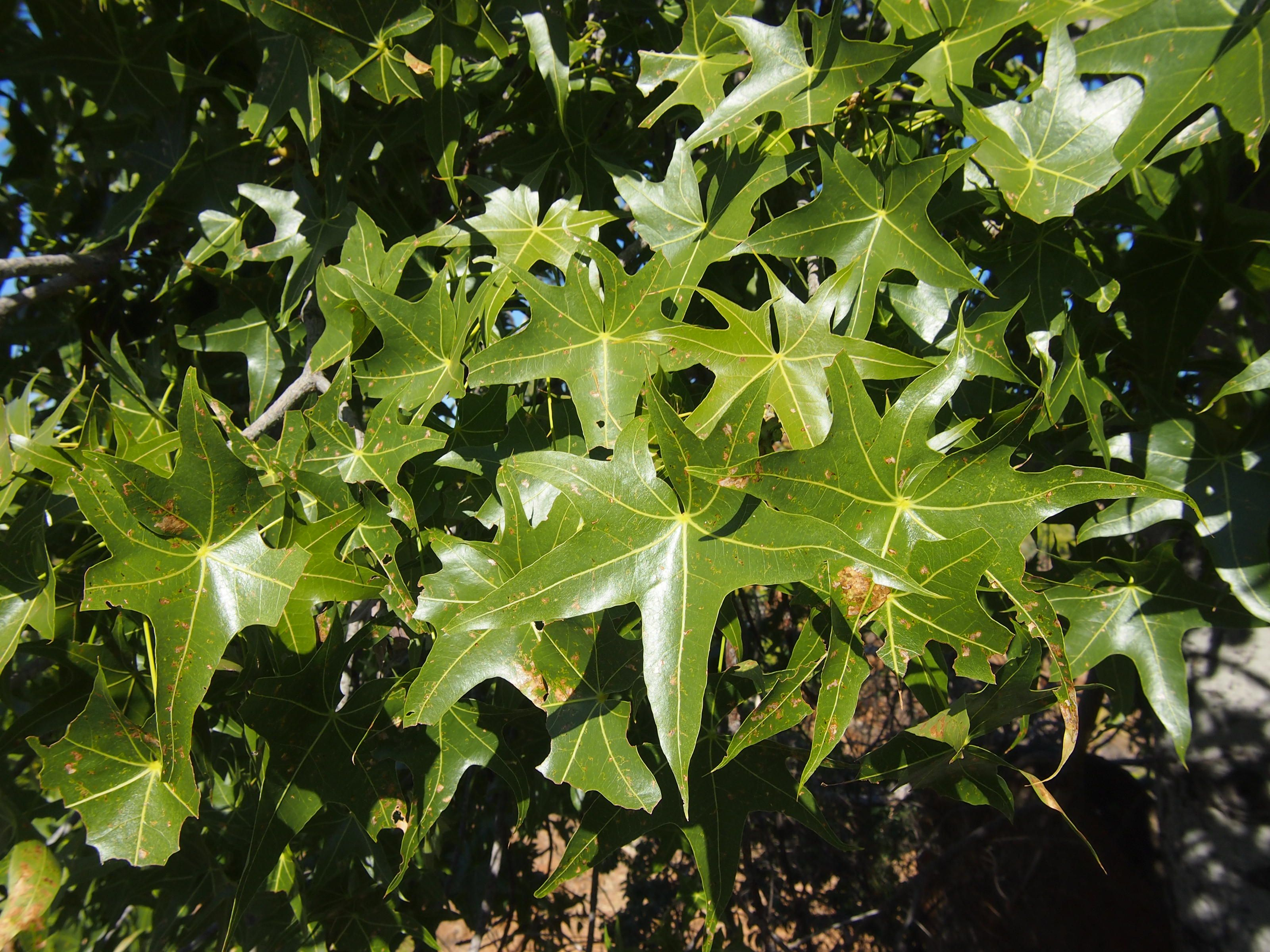
- Habit and foliage

Scientific classification
- Kingdom: Plantae
- Clade: Tracheophytes
- Clade: Angiosperms
- Clade: Eudicots
- Clade: Rosids
- Order: Malvales
- Family: Malvaceae
- Genus: Brachychiton
- Species: B. collinus

Binomial name
- Brachychiton collinus Guymer

= Brachychiton collinus =

Outcrop kurrajong

Species of tree

Brachychiton collinus, the outcrop kurrajong, is a small deciduous tree found growing in some of the harshest climatic conditions in Australia. This small tree is commonly found between Cloncurry and Mount Isa in North-West Queensland, Australia. The North-West savannah zone of Queensland is characterised by very high summer temperatures of up to 50°C and an unpredictable monsoonal rainfall that may deliver the whole annual rainfall of some 50 cm overnight. This tree most often grows on rocky outcrops where little other scrub, grasses or other understory plants can survive. It is probable that this preference for bare rocky outcrops is a function of the tree's sensitivity to fire. Most Brachychiton species do not survive a strong grass or brush fire.
