= Brachychiton tridentatus =

Scientific classification
- Kingdom: Plantae
- Clade: Tracheophytes
- Clade: Angiosperms
- Clade: Eudicots
- Clade: Rosids
- Order: Malvales
- Family: Malvaceae
- Genus: Brachychiton
- Species: B. tridentatus

Binomial name
- Brachychiton tridentatus Guymer

Species of tree

Brachychiton tridentatus, locally known as sentry bottle tree, is a tree of the genus Brachychiton (Note: The genus Brachychiton was traditionally placed in the family Sterculiaceae, but that family, along with Bombacaceae and Tiliaceae, has been found to be polyphyletic and is now sunk into a more broadly-defined Malvaceae) found in northwestern Western Australia. It was first described in 1988 by Gordon Guymer.
