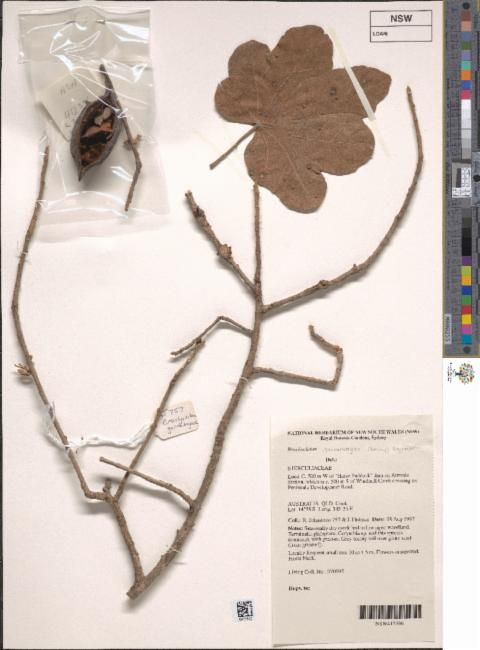
- specimen NSW412396 (CC-BY 4.0, National Herbarium of New South Wales)

Scientific classification
- Kingdom: Plantae
- Clade: Tracheophytes
- Clade: Angiosperms
- Clade: Eudicots
- Clade: Rosids
- Order: Malvales
- Family: Malvaceae
- Genus: Brachychiton
- Species: B. garrawayae

Binomial name
- Brachychiton garrawayae (F.M.Bailey) Guymer

= Brachychiton garrawayae =

Species of tree native to Australia

Brachychiton garrawayae is a small tree in the genus Brachychiton (Note: The genus Brachychiton was traditionally placed in the family Sterculiaceae, but that family, along with Bombacaceae and Tiliaceae, has been found to be polyphyletic and is now sunk into a more broadly-defined Malvaceae) found on the Cape York peninsula.

The species was first described by Frederick Manson Bailey in 1899 as Sterculia garrawayae, but was transferred to the genus, Brachychiton, in 1989 by Gordon Guymer.
