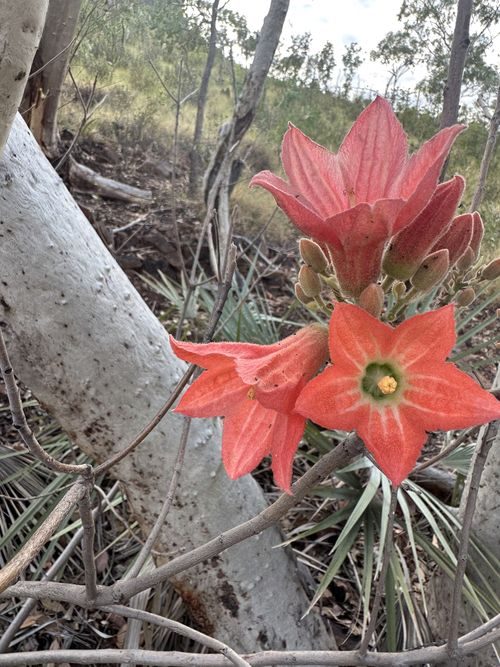
- (image by Richard Jacob, CC-BY 4.0)

Scientific classification
- Kingdom: Plantae
- Clade: Tracheophytes
- Clade: Angiosperms
- Clade: Eudicots
- Clade: Rosids
- Order: Malvales
- Family: Malvaceae
- Genus: Brachychiton
- Species: B. spectabilis

Binomial name
- Brachychiton spectabilis Guymer

= Brachychiton spectabilis =

Species of tree

Brachychiton spectabilis is a tree of the genus Brachychiton (Note: The genus Brachychiton was traditionally placed in the family Sterculiaceae, but that family, along with Bombacaceae and Tiliaceae, has been found to be polyphyletic and is now sunk into a more broadly-defined Malvaceae) found in northern Australia. It was first described by Gordon Guymer in 1988.
