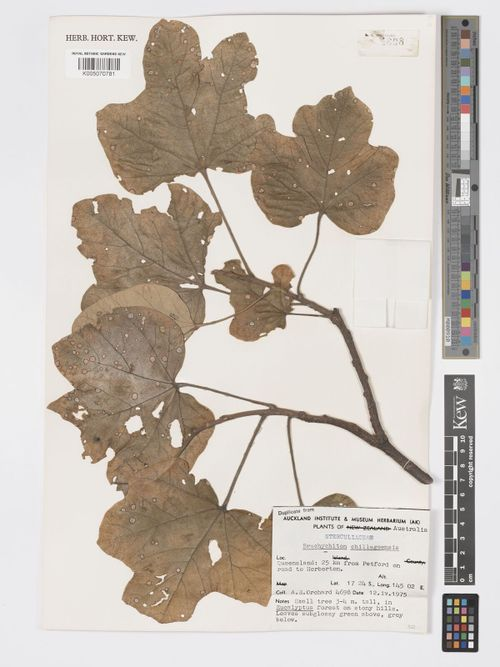
- K005070781 (image CC-BY 4.0 from Royal Botanic Gardens, Kew)

Conservation status
- Special Least Concern (NCA)

Scientific classification
- Kingdom: Plantae
- Clade: Tracheophytes
- Clade: Angiosperms
- Clade: Eudicots
- Clade: Rosids
- Order: Malvales
- Family: Malvaceae
- Genus: Brachychiton
- Species: B. chillagoensis

Binomial name
- Brachychiton chillagoensis Guymer

= Brachychiton chillagoensis =

Species of tree

Brachychiton chillagoensis is a tree of the genus Brachychiton (Note: The genus Brachychiton was traditionally placed in the family Sterculiaceae, but that family, along with Bombacaceae and Tiliaceae, has been found to be polyphyletic and is now sunk into a more broadly-defined Malvaceae) native to Queensland, Australia. It was first described in 1988 by Gordon Guymer from a specimen collected 5.3 km south-east of Chillagoe.

== Conservation Status ==
Brachychiton chillagoensis is listed as "Special Least Concern" under the Nature Conservation Act 1992.
