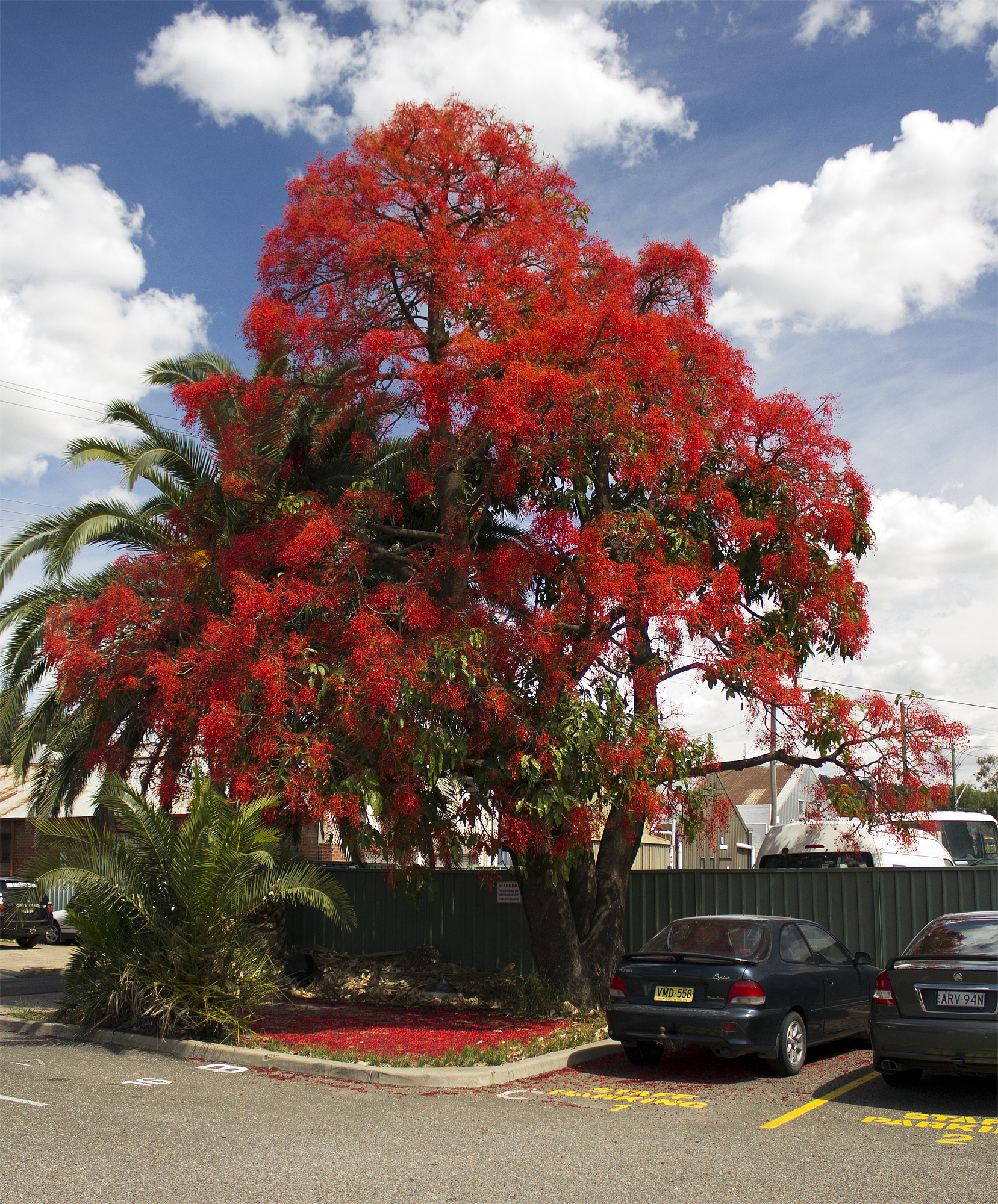
- Brachychiton acerifolius

Scientific classification
- Kingdom: Plantae
- Clade: Tracheophytes
- Clade: Angiosperms
- Clade: Eudicots
- Clade: Rosids
- Order: Malvales
- Family: Malvaceae
- Subfamily: Sterculioideae
- Genus: Brachychiton; Schott & Endl. (1832)

Species
- See text

Synonyms
- Oleobachia Mast. (1880); Poecilodermis Schott & Endl. (1832); Trichosiphon Schott & Endl. (1832)

= Brachychiton =

Genus of flowering plants

Brachychiton (kurrajong, bottletree) is a genus of 31 species of trees and large shrubs, native to Australia (the centre of diversity, with 30 species) and New Guinea (one species). Fossils from New South Wales and New Zealand are estimated to be 50 million years old, corresponding to the Paleogene.

== Description ==
They grow to 4 – 30m tall, and some are dry-season deciduous. Several species (though not all) are pachycaul plants with a very stout stem for their overall size, used to store water during periods of drought. The leaves show intraspecific variation and generally range from entire to deeply palmately lobed with long slender leaflet-like lobes joined only right at the base. Their sizes range from 4 – 20 cm long and wide.

All species are monoecious with separate male and female flowers on the same plant. The flowers have a bell-shaped perianth consisting of a single series of fused lobes which is regarded as a calyx despite being brightly coloured in most species. The female flowers have five separate carpels that can each form a woody fruit containing several seeds. The flower colour is often variable within species. Eastern forest species drop their foliage before flowering but those of the drier regions carry the flowers while in leaf.

== Name ==
The name Brachychiton is derived from the Greek brachys, short, and chiton, tunic, in referring to its loose seed coats. The generic name is often misconstrued as being of neuter gender, with the specific epithets then incorrectly amended. Thus B. rupestre and B. populneum are sometimes seen in horticultural books and magazines.

Kurrajong comes from the Dharuk language garrajuŋ 'fishing line', as fishing lines were made from kurrajong bark.

== Species ==
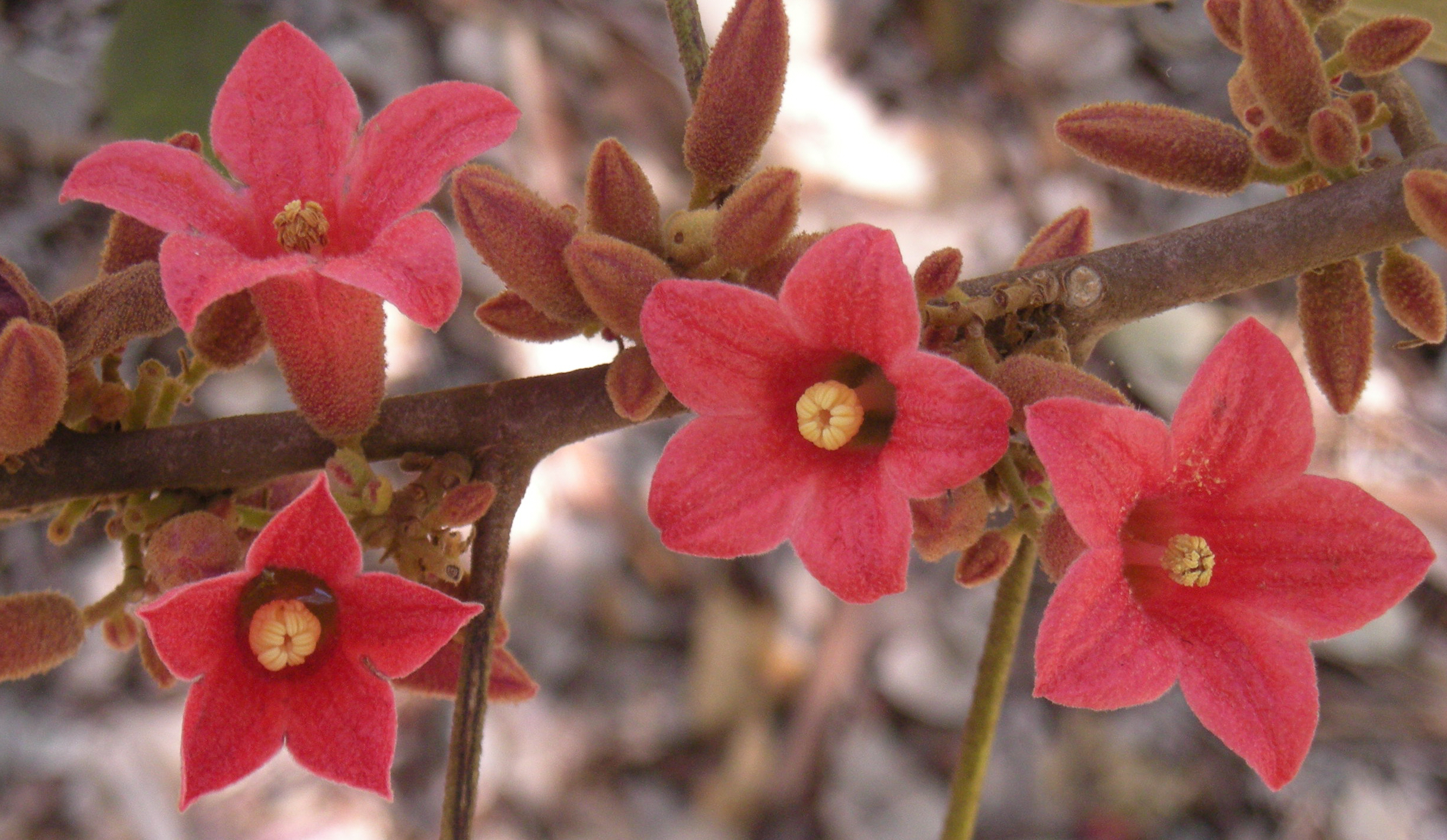
B. bidwillii flowers

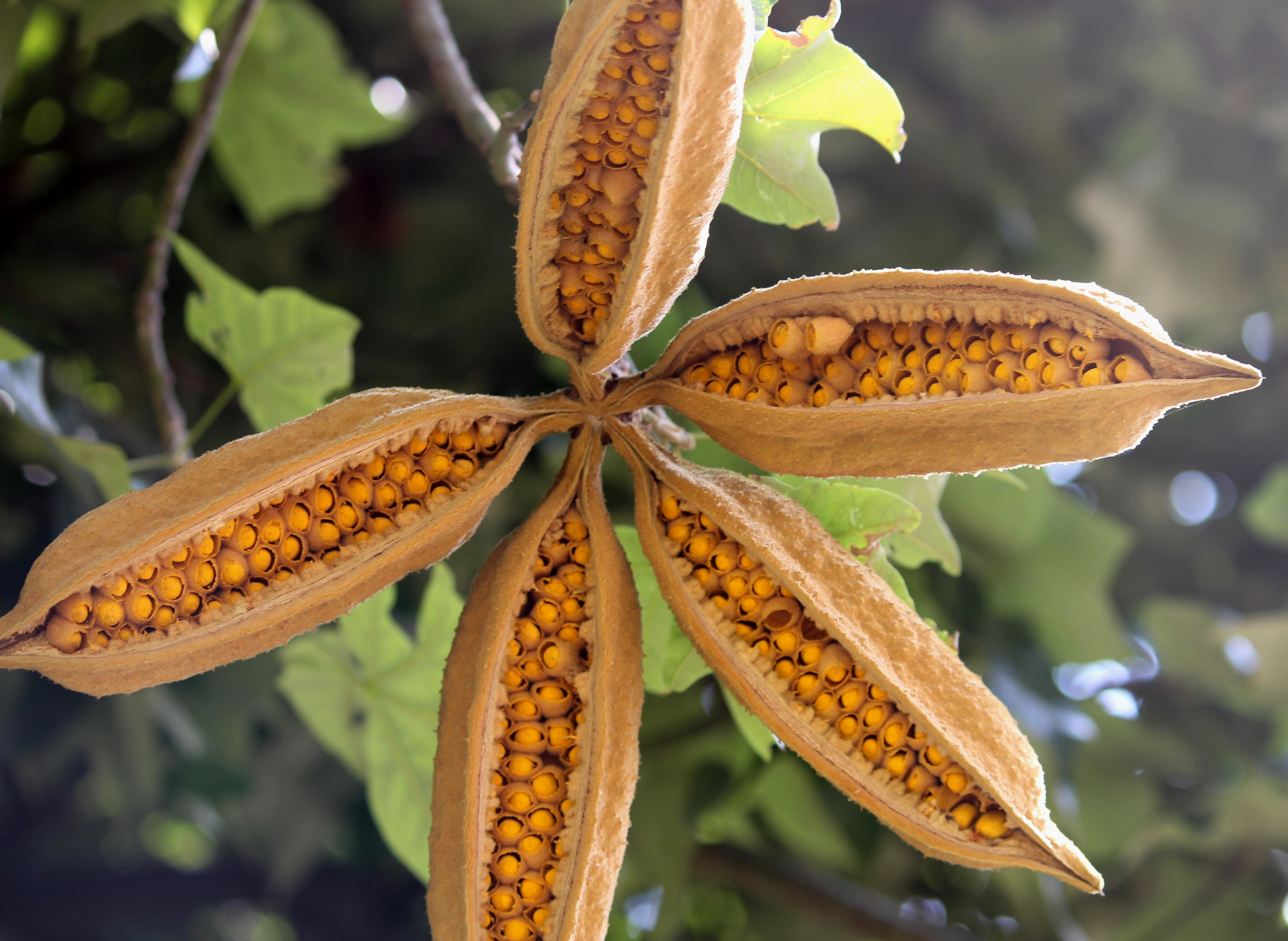
A full set of five follicles of Brachychiton discolor. They develop from a single flower, and the seeds are exposed when the fruit dries out and splits open (dehisces) along a seam.

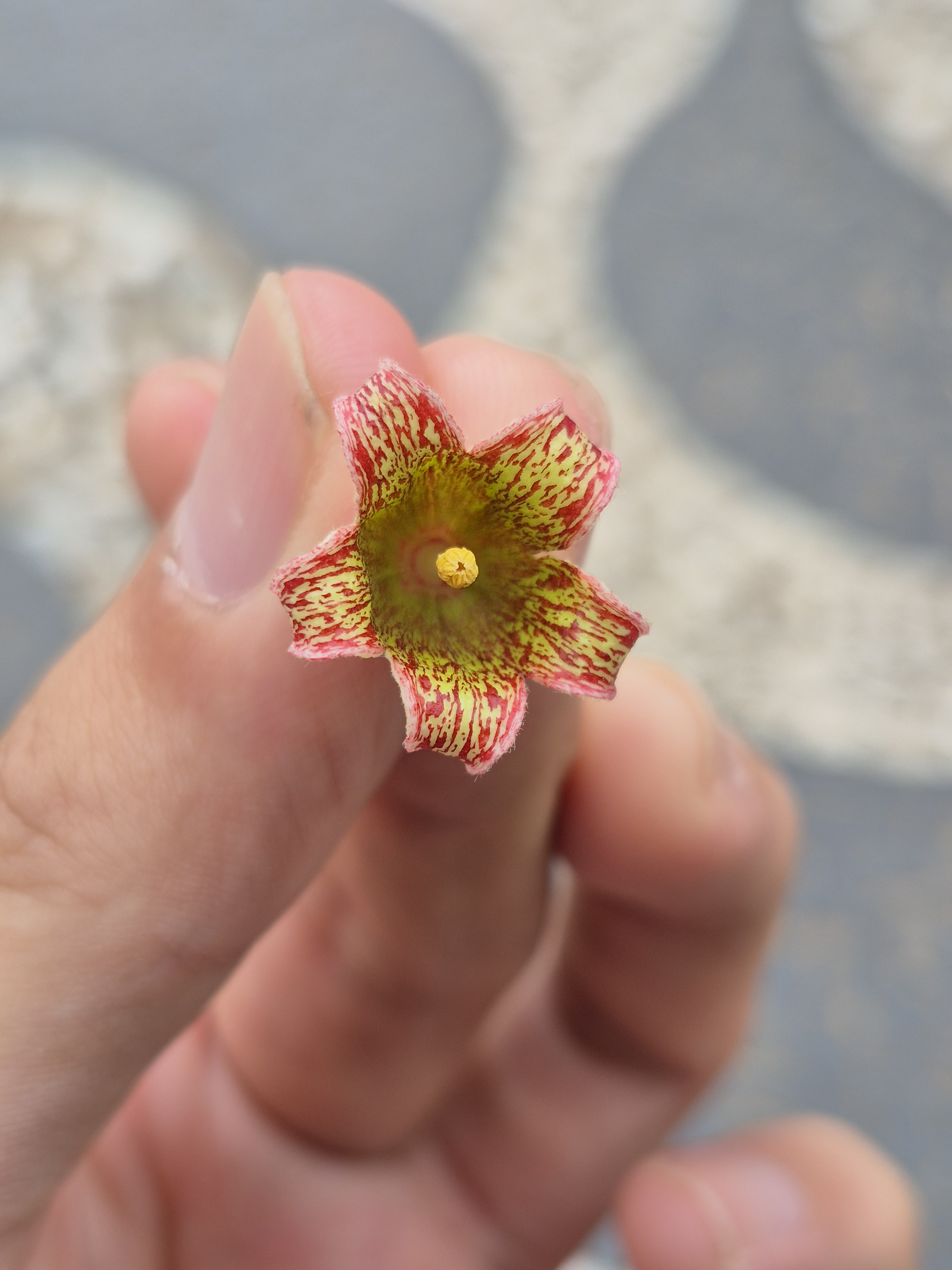
B. populneus flower (cultivated in Brazil)

33 species are accepted.

- Brachychiton acerifolius (A.Cunn. ex G.Don) F.Muell. – Illawarra flame tree, flame kurrajong, couramyn
- Brachychiton acuminatus Guymer
- Brachychiton albidus Guymer
- Brachychiton × allochrous Guymer
- Brachychiton australis (Schott & Endl.) A.Terracc. – Broad-leaved bottletree, large-leaved kurrajong
- Brachychiton bidwillii Hook. – Rusty kurrajong, little kurrajong, pink lacebark
- Brachychiton carruthersii Müll.Arg.
- Brachychiton chillagoensis Guymer
- Brachychiton chrysocarpus Cowie & Guymer
- Brachychiton collinus Guymer
- Brachychiton compactus Guymer
- Brachychiton discolor F.Muell. – Scrub bottletree, lacebark tree, pink flame tree, white kurrajong
- Brachychiton diversifolius R.Br. – Northern kurrajong
- Brachychiton × excellens Guymer
- Brachychiton fitzgeraldianus Guymer
- Brachychiton garrawayae (F.M.Bailey) Guymer
- Brachychiton grandiflorus Guymer
- Brachychiton gregorii F.Muell. – Desert kurrajong
- Brachychiton guymeri J.A.Bever., Fensham & P.I.Forst.
- Brachychiton × hirtellus Guymer
- Brachychiton incanus R.Br.
- Brachychiton × incarnatus Guymer
- Brachychiton megaphyllus Guymer
- Brachychiton muellerianus Guymer
- Brachychiton multicaulis Guymer
- Brachychiton obtusilobus Guymer
- Brachychiton paradoxus Schott & Endl. – Red-flowered kurrajong
- Brachychiton populneus (Schott & Endl.) R.Br. – Lacebark kurrajong, white-flower kurrajong, bottle tree, black kurrajong, northern kurrajong
- Brachychiton rupestris (T.Mitch. ex Lindl.) K.Schum. – Queensland bottle tree, narrow-leaf bottletree, Queensland kurrajong
- Brachychiton spectabilis Guymer
- Brachychiton tridentatus Guymer
- Brachychiton tuberculatus (W.Fitzg.) Guymer – Meayacka
- Brachychiton × turgidulus Guymer
- Brachychiton velutinosus Kosterm. – Brush kurrajong
- Brachychiton × vinicolor Guymer
- Brachychiton viridiflorus (W.Fitzg.) Guymer
- Brachychiton viscidulus (W.Fitzg.) Guymer
- Brachychiton vitifolius (F.M.Bailey) Guymer
- Brachychiton xanthophyllus Guymer

== Cultivation ==
A few species of kurrajong are popular garden trees and have been introduced to hot dry regions including the Mediterranean, South Africa and the western United States. These species are also hybridised for horticultural purposes, B. populneo-acerifolius being one example. Kurrajongs are known to bloom erratically in cultivation.
