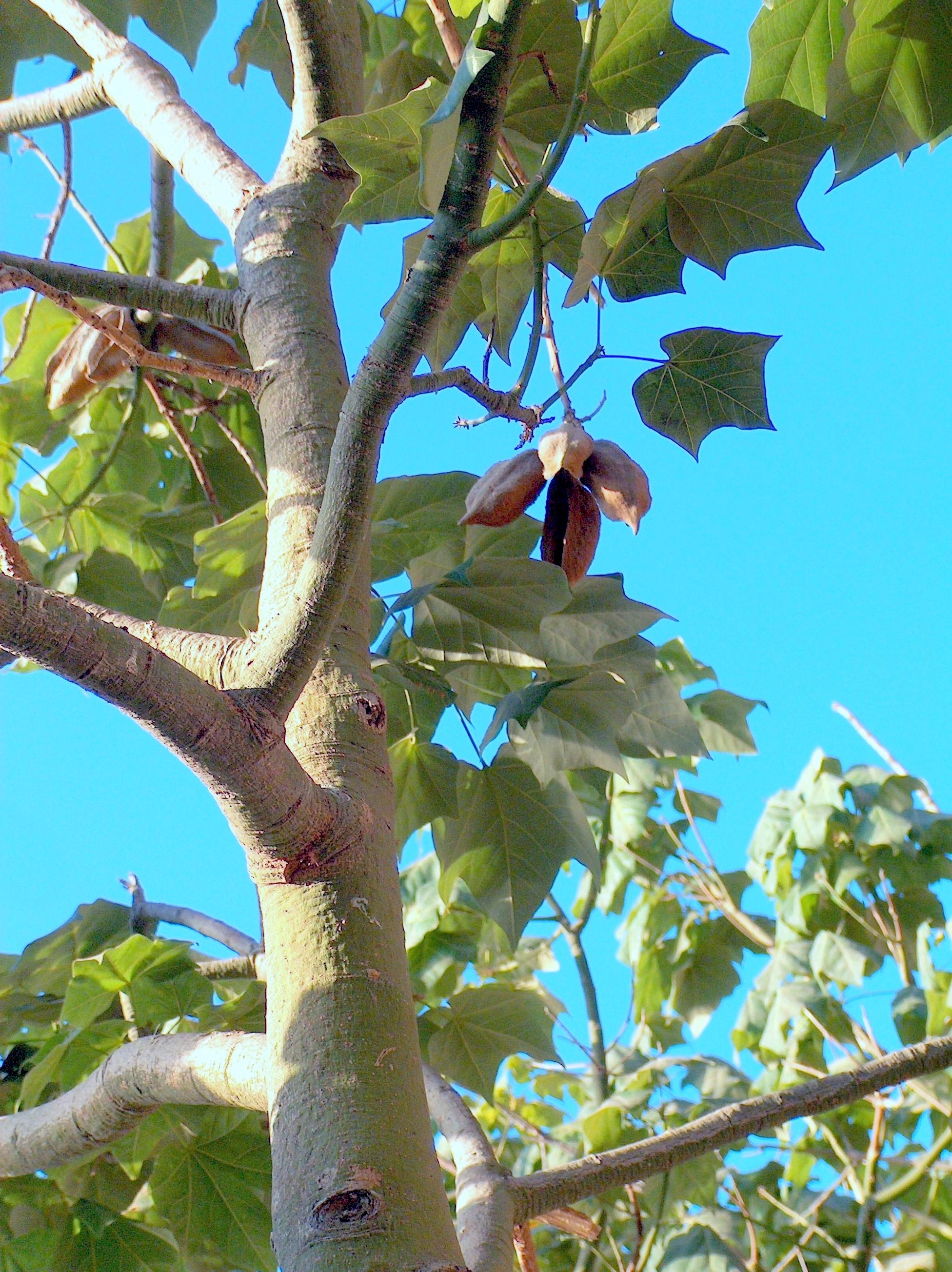
- Horticultural specimen in Spain

Conservation status
- Least Concern (IUCN 3.1)

Scientific classification
- Kingdom: Plantae
- Clade: Tracheophytes
- Clade: Angiosperms
- Clade: Eudicots
- Clade: Rosids
- Order: Malvales
- Family: Malvaceae
- Genus: Brachychiton
- Species: B. discolor

Binomial name
- Brachychiton discolor F.Muell.

Synonyms
- Sterculia discolor F.Muell.; Brachychiton luridum C.Moore

= Brachychiton discolor =

Species of tree

Brachychiton discolor is a rainforest tree of eastern Australia. It grows in drier rainforest areas. Scattered from Paterson, New South Wales (32° S) to Mackay, Queensland (21° S), there is also an isolated community of these trees on Cape York Peninsula in tropical Queensland.

Common names include lacebark tree, lace kurrajong, pink kurrajong, scrub bottle tree, white kurrajong, hat tree and sycamore.

== Description ==
Brachychiton discolor is a tree that grows up to 30 metres (100 ft) tall. It has pink flowers without petals. The trunk is straight, grey and cylindrical, up to 75 cm (30 in) in diameter. It is not buttressed at the base. The twigs are hairy, brown and smooth.

The leaves are hairy and lobed with three, five or seven points. They are 10–20 cm (4–8 in) in diameter, whitish underneath and dark green above. Leaf veins are visible on both sides.

Flowers form from November to February. They are pink, almost without stalks and 3–4 cm (1.2–1.6 in) in diameter. Male and female flowers are separate and without petals. The fruit is a hairy boat-shaped follicle maturing from December to July. It is 7–20 cm (3–8 in) long, containing up to 30 seeds, each 9 mm (0.35 in) long. Germination from fresh seed occurs without difficulty.

== Uses ==
Brachychiton discolor is widely planted as an ornamental tree. The wood is used to make shields by Indigenous Australians. The roasted seeds are edible to humans.

== Gallery ==
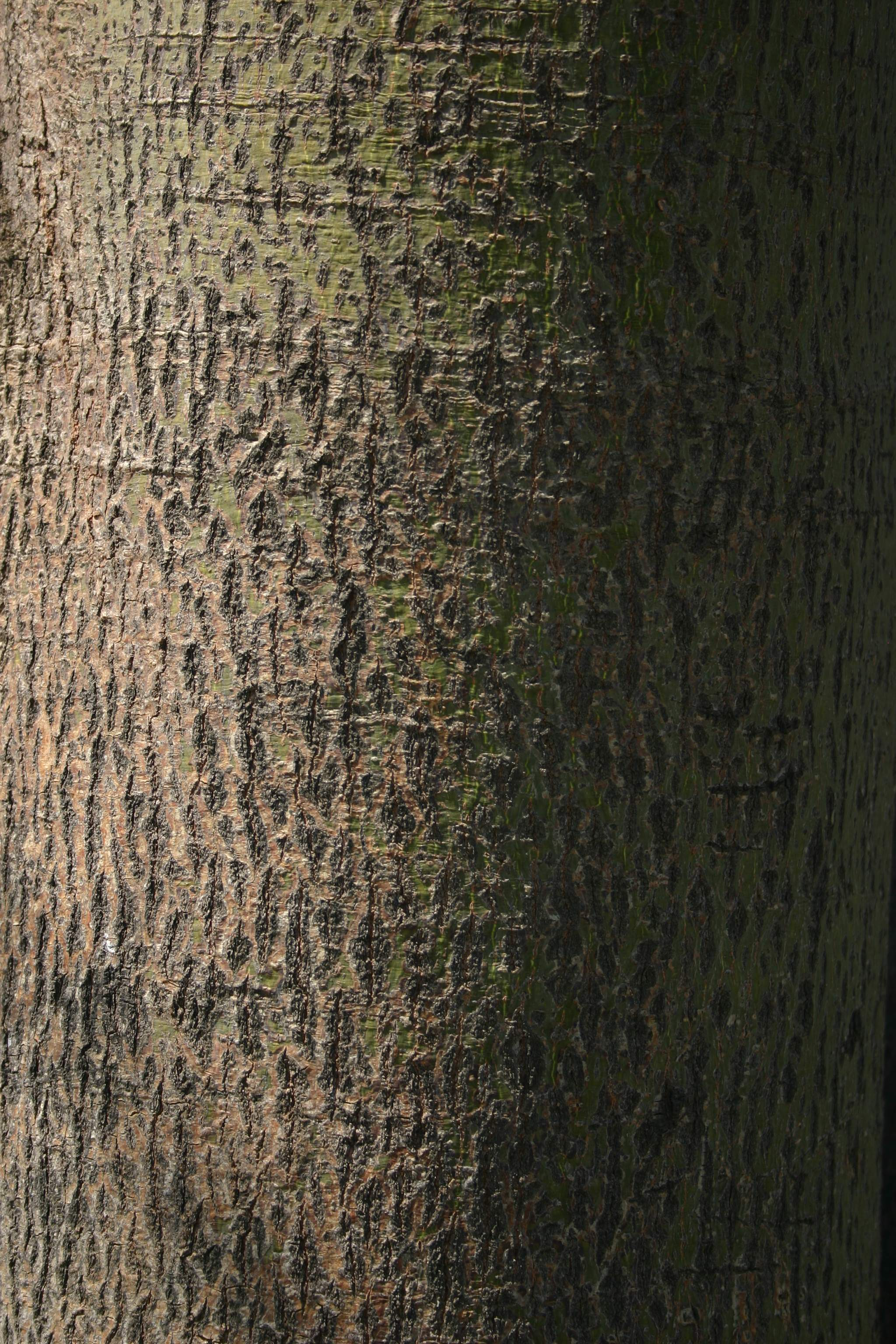
Bark

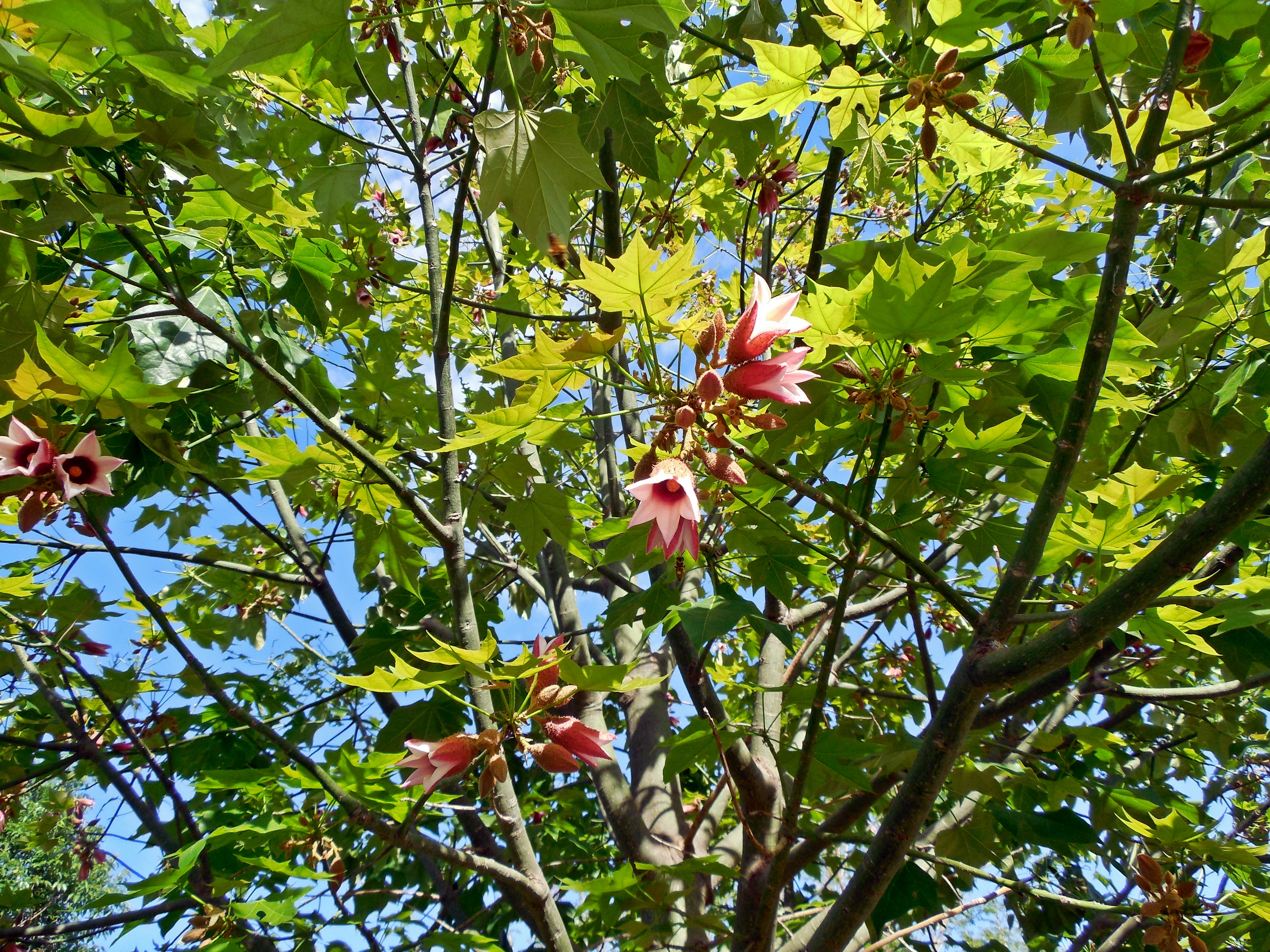
In flower during midsummer

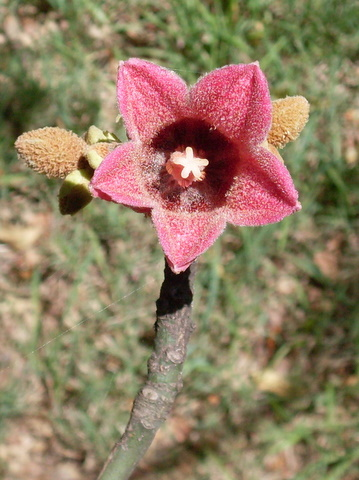
Flower at Royal Botanic Gardens, Sydney

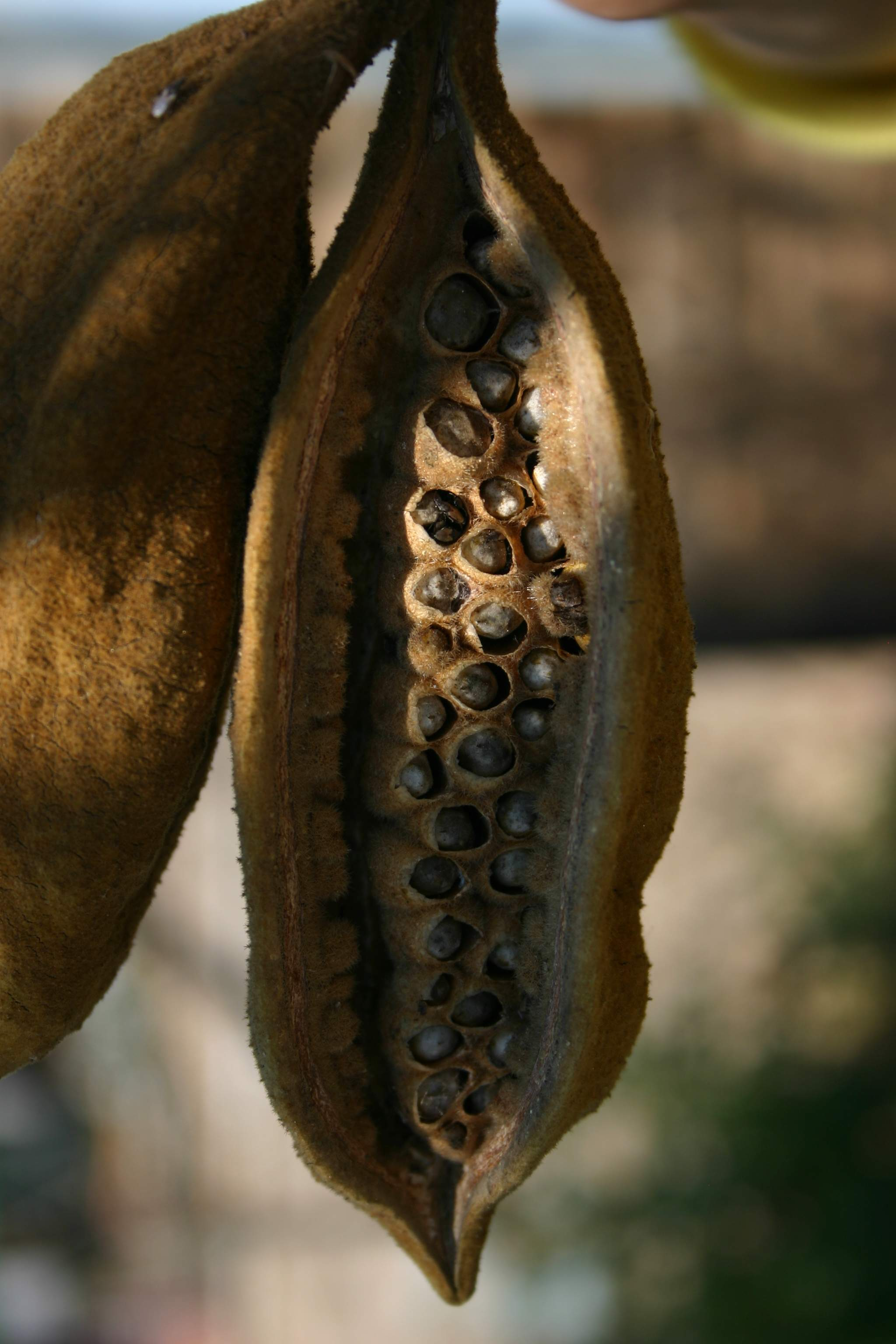
The boat-shaped seed pod (follicle)
