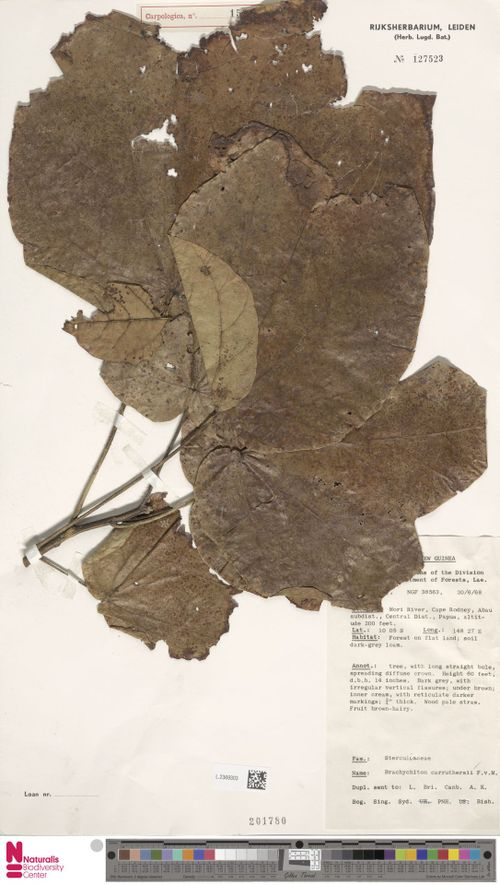
- Specimen L.2369303_2053118523, collected in Papua-New Guinea (image licence CC-0 from Naturalis Biodiversity Center

Conservation status
- Vulnerable (IUCN 3.1)

Scientific classification
- Kingdom: Plantae
- Clade: Tracheophytes
- Clade: Angiosperms
- Clade: Eudicots
- Clade: Rosids
- Order: Malvales
- Family: Malvaceae
- Genus: Brachychiton
- Species: B. carruthersii

Binomial name
- Brachychiton carruthersii F.Muell.

= Brachychiton carruthersii =

Species of flowering plant

Brachychiton carruthersii is a species of flowering plant in the family Malvaceae. (Note: The genus Brachychiton was traditionally placed in the family Sterculiaceae, but that family, along with Bombacaceae and Tiliaceae, has been found to be polyphyletic and is now sunk into a more broadly-defined Malvaceae) It is found only in Papua New Guinea. It is threatened by habitat loss.
