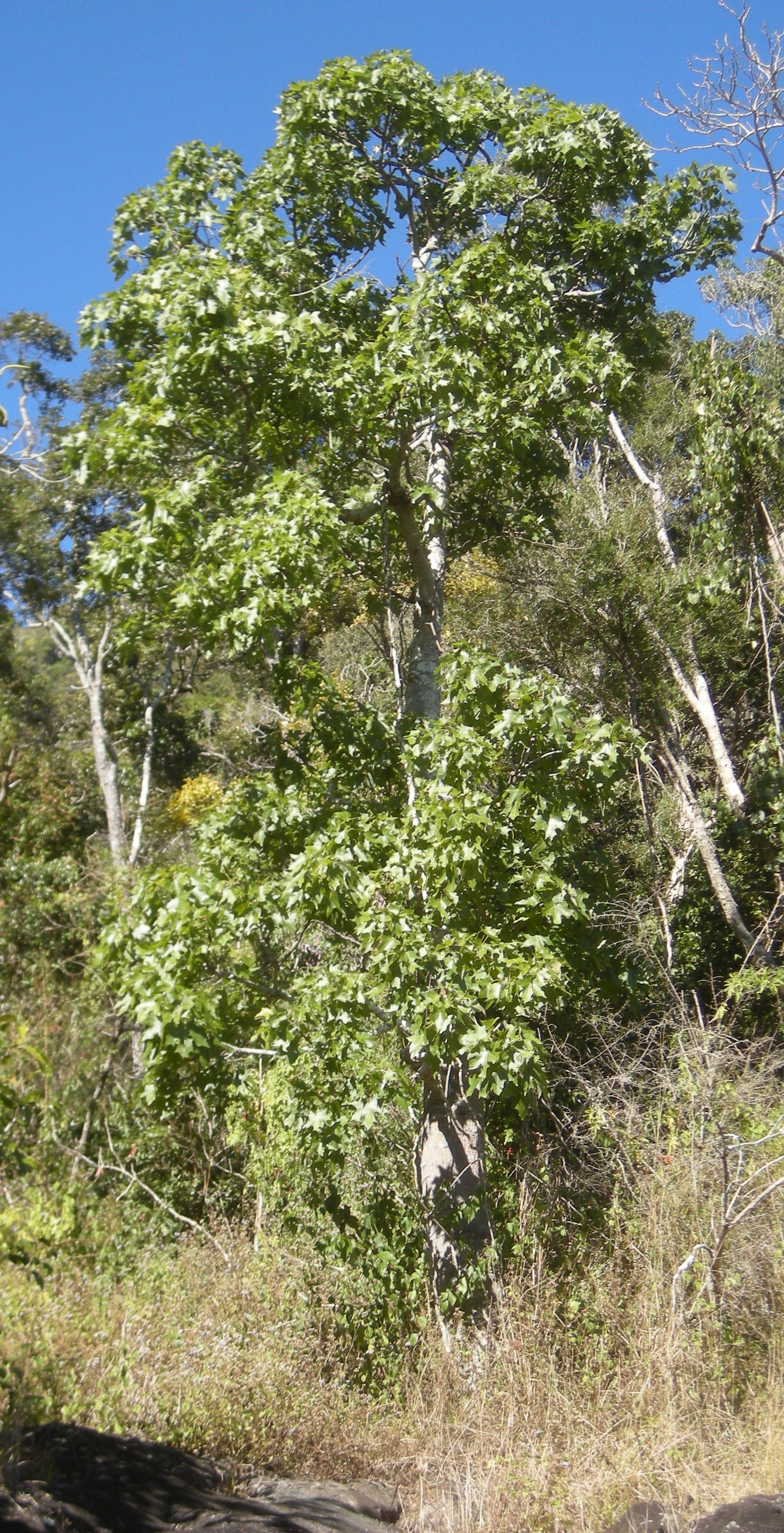

Scientific classification
- Kingdom: Plantae
- Clade: Embryophytes
- Clade: Tracheophytes
- Clade: Spermatophytes
- Clade: Angiosperms
- Clade: Eudicots
- Clade: Rosids
- Order: Malvales
- Family: Malvaceae
- Genus: Brachychiton
- Species: B. australis

Binomial name
- Brachychiton australis (Schott & Endl.) A.Terracc.

= Brachychiton australis =

Broad-leaved bottle tree

Species of tree

Brachychiton australis, commonly known as the broad-leaved bottle tree, is a small tree of the genus Brachychiton (Note: The genus Brachychiton was traditionally placed in the family Sterculiaceae, but that family, along with Bombacaceae and Tiliaceae, has been found to be polyphyletic and is now sunk into a more broadly-defined Malvaceae.) found in eastern Australia. It was originally classified in the family Sterculiaceae, which is now within Malvaceae.

== Gallery ==
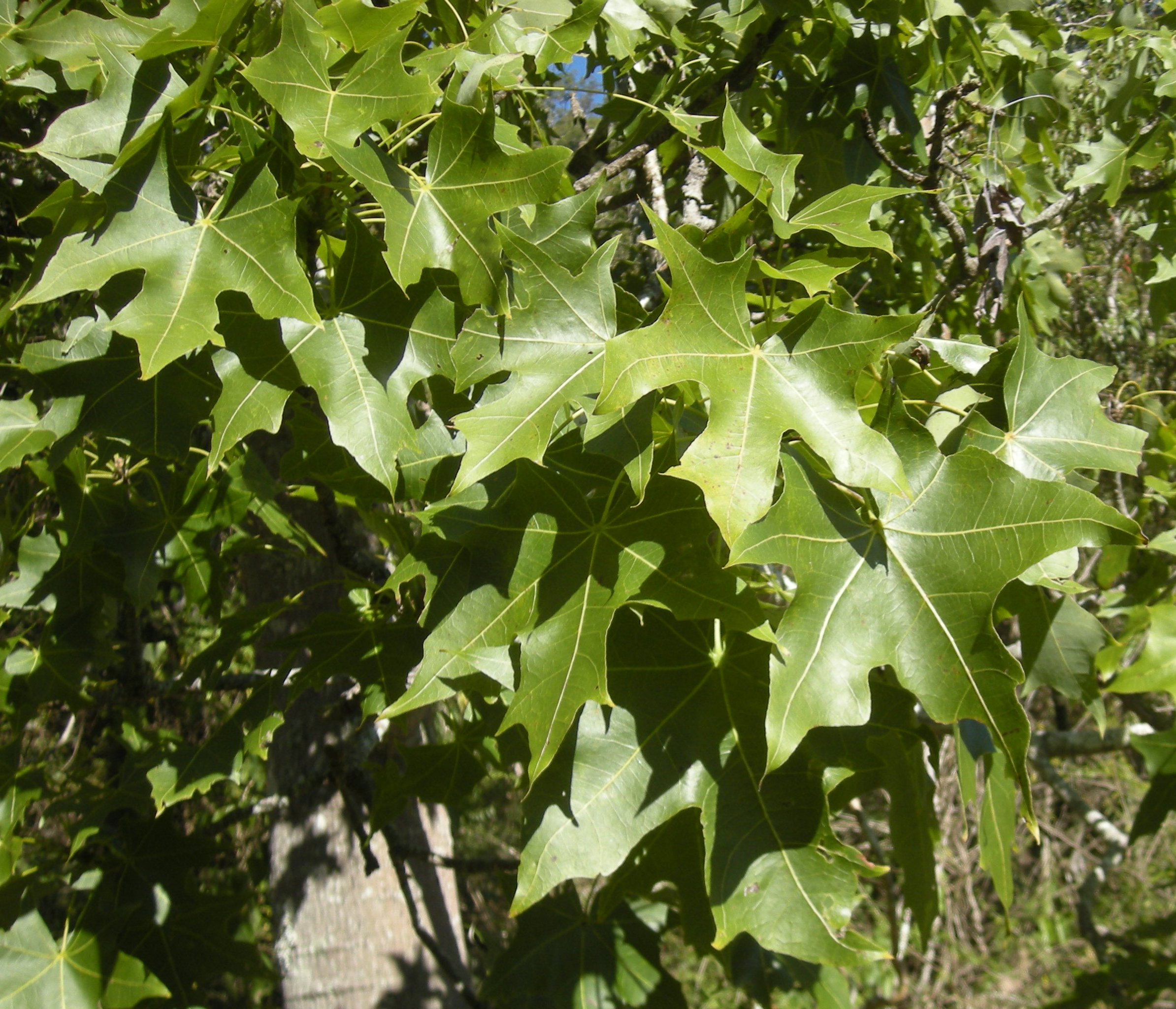
Close-up of foliage

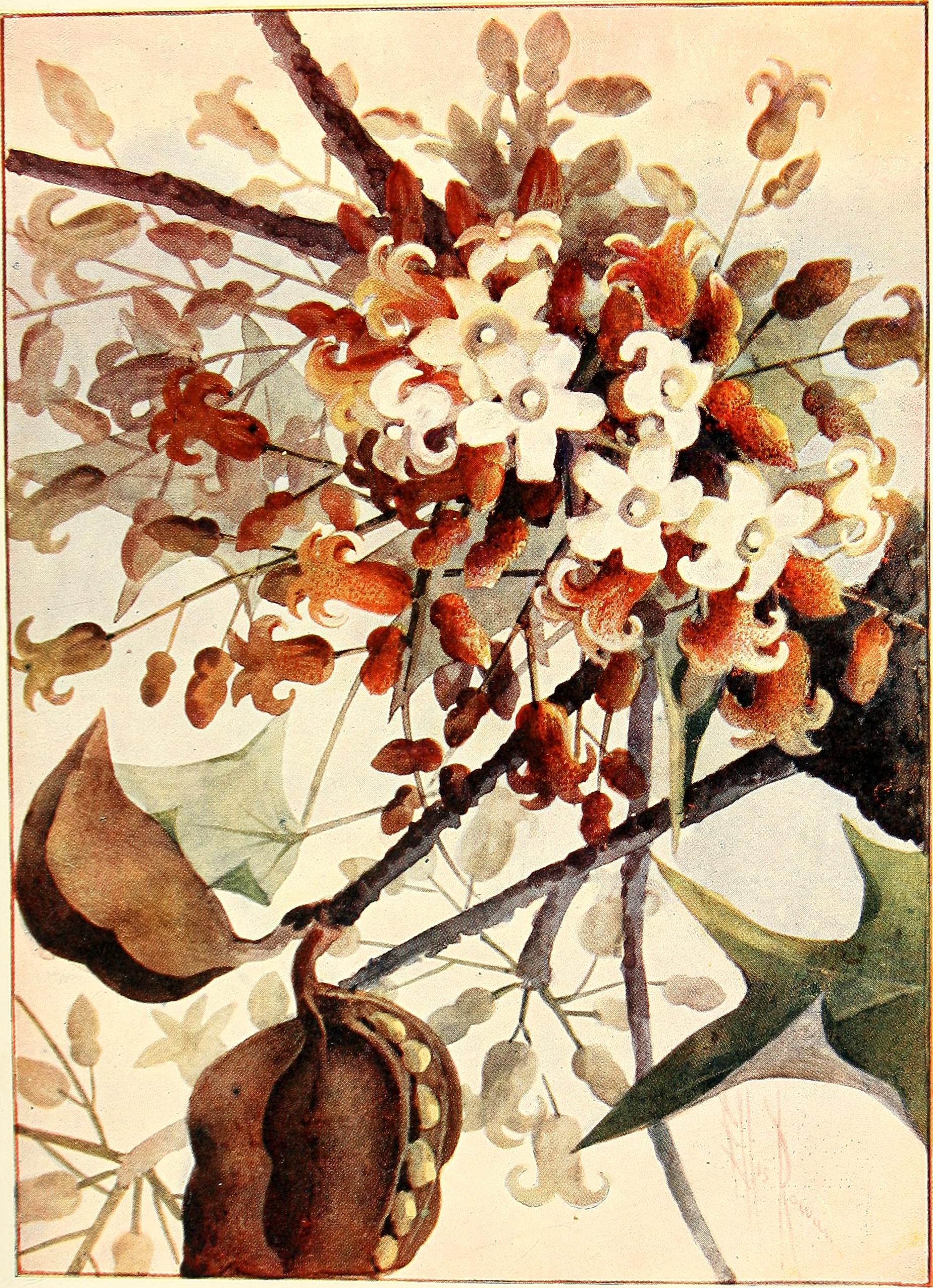
Illustration of flowers and follicles

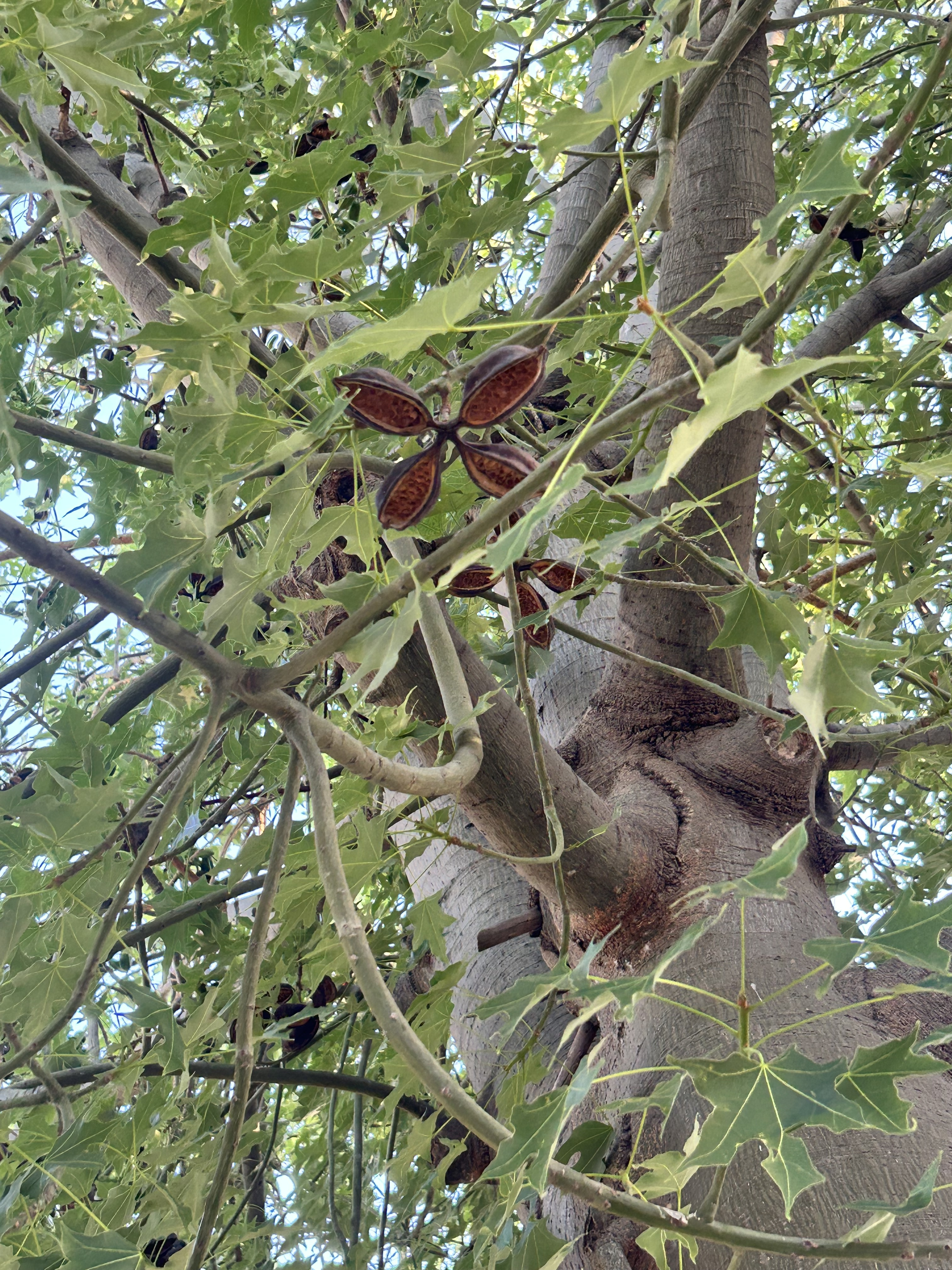
Opened follicles on tree

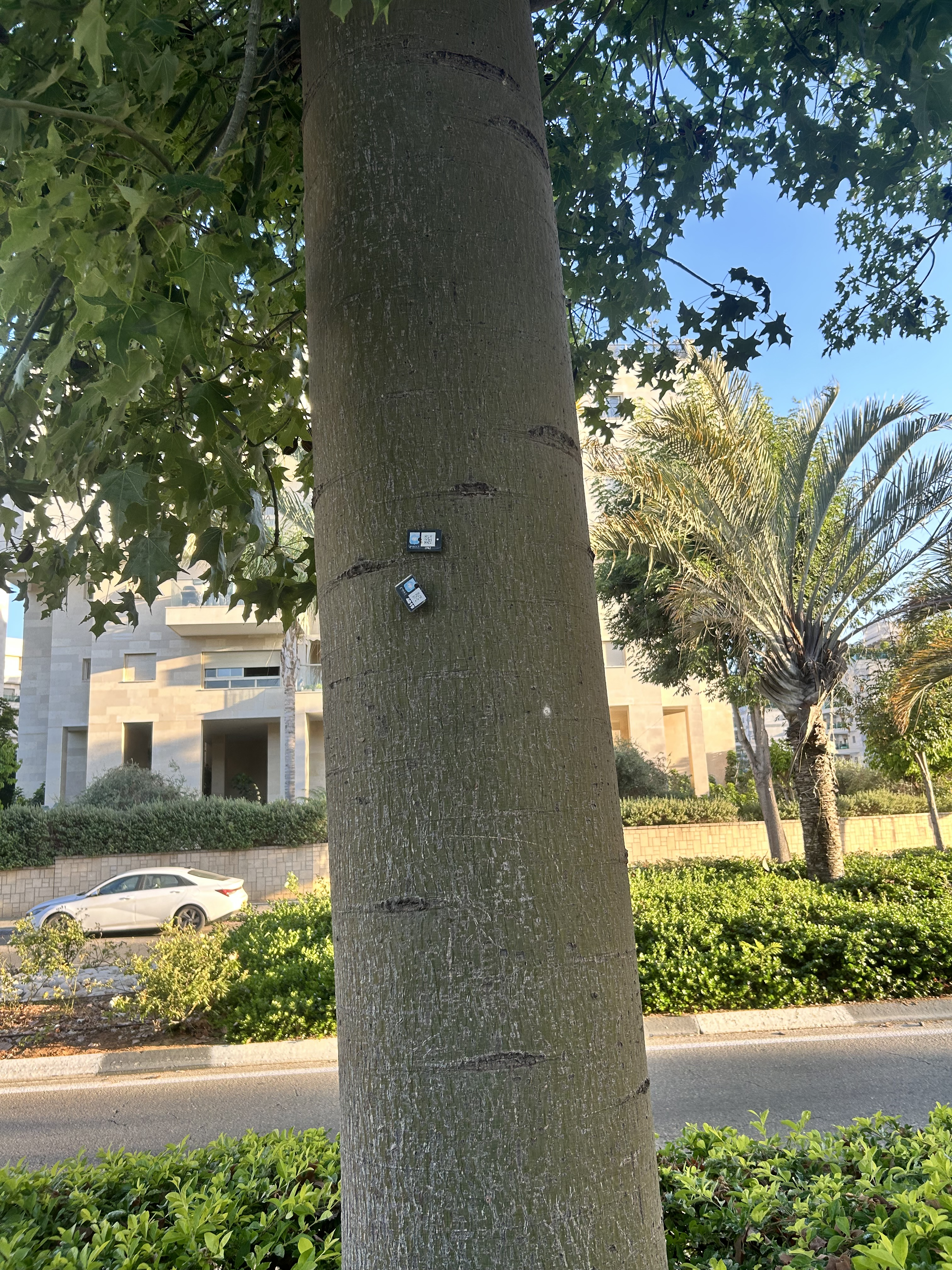
Trunk and bark
