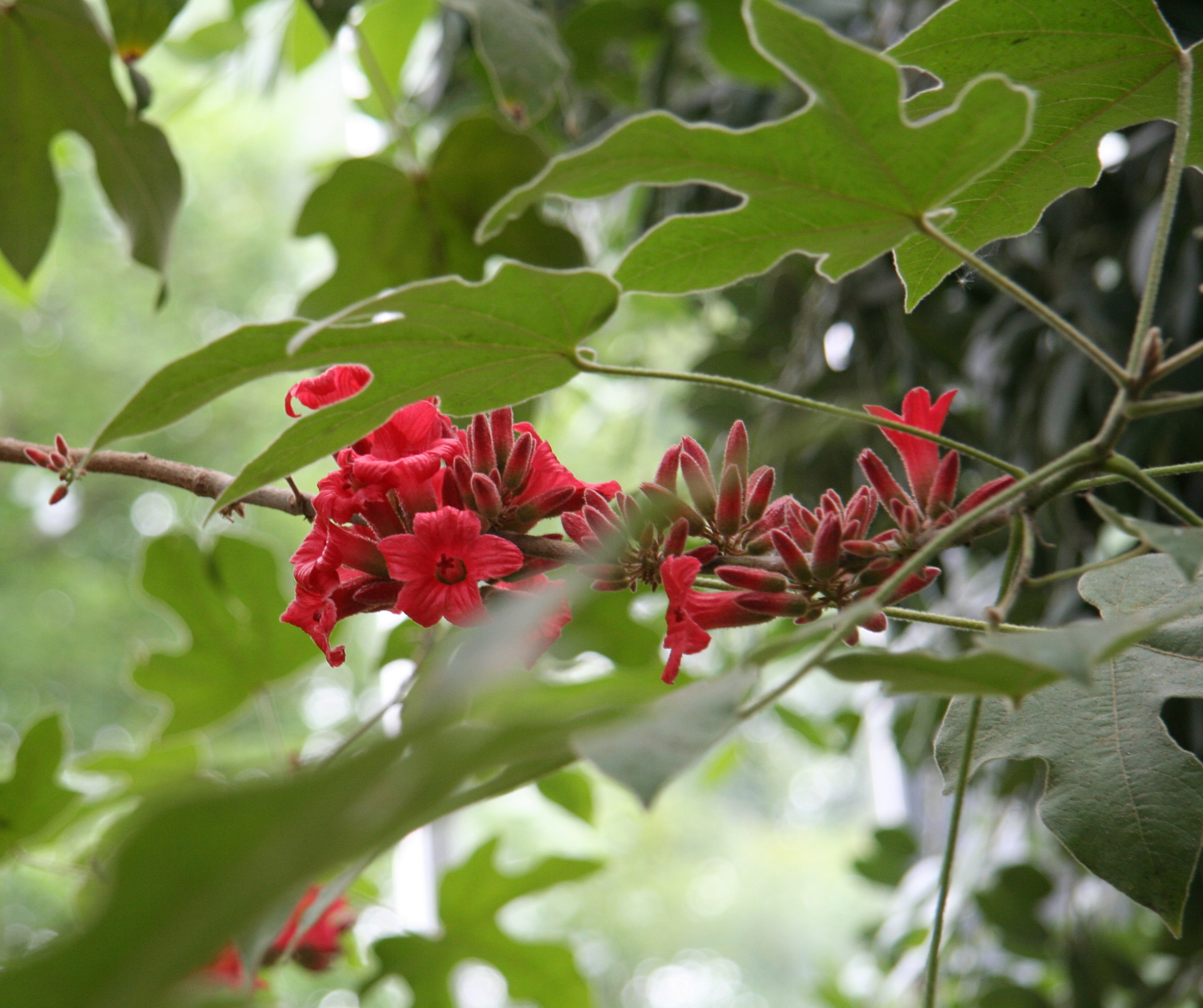

Scientific classification
- Kingdom: Plantae
- Clade: Embryophytes
- Clade: Tracheophytes
- Clade: Spermatophytes
- Clade: Angiosperms
- Clade: Eudicots
- Clade: Rosids
- Order: Malvales
- Family: Malvaceae
- Genus: Brachychiton
- Species: B. bidwillii

Binomial name
- Brachychiton bidwillii Hook., 1859

= Brachychiton bidwillii =

Species of tree

Brachychiton bidwillii, commonly known as the dwarf kurrajong or little kurrajong, is a small tree of the genus Brachychiton found in tropical areas of eastern Australia, particularly Queensland. It was originally classified in the family Sterculiaceae, which is now within Malvaceae. (Note: The genus Brachychiton was traditionally placed in the family Sterculiaceae, but that family, along with Bombacaceae and Tiliaceae, has been found to be polyphyletic and is now sunk into a more broadly-defined Malvaceae)

It was named after botanist John Carne Bidwill.

== Description ==
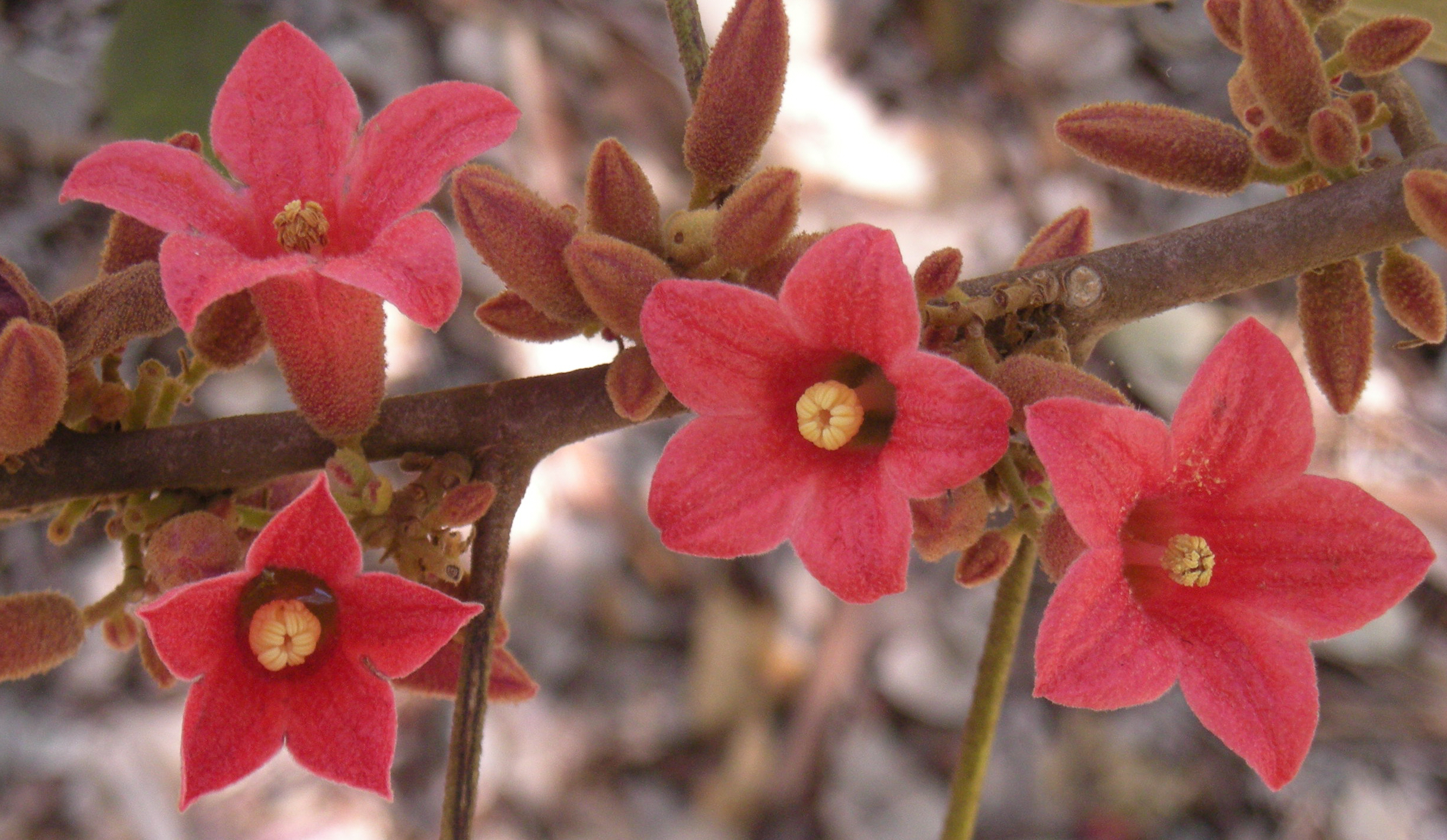
Flower closeup

It is a semi-deciduous or evergreen shrub, sometimes growing as a small tree, on a single stem that reaches 4 metres (13 ft) to as high as 7 metres (23 ft) tall and spreads 4 metres (13 ft). Though other varieties may not grow over 2 metres (6.6 ft). The caudex is distended, where it can store large quantities of water in its fleshy stems.

After the leaves drop, the showy flowers appear in spring for as long as 4 to 6 weeks. In frostless conditions, they can flower from as early as July to February in the Southern Hemisphere. As the plant ages, flowers appear more profusely, appearing down to the trunk.

=== Varieties ===
The Southern Queensland variety occasionally features deeply lobed leaves, whereas the ‘Maroochydore’ form has rather hairy, five-lobed leaves which are puce-coloured when juvenile, with pink flowers having a different shape than others, and a long tube. Larger flowers are present in some plants from the northern inland Queensland. The 'Northern Coastal' has five deeply lobed leaves with small bright red unfading flowers. The 'Leichhardt' form flowers for 3 months from mid-spring in a cold year.

== Cultivation ==
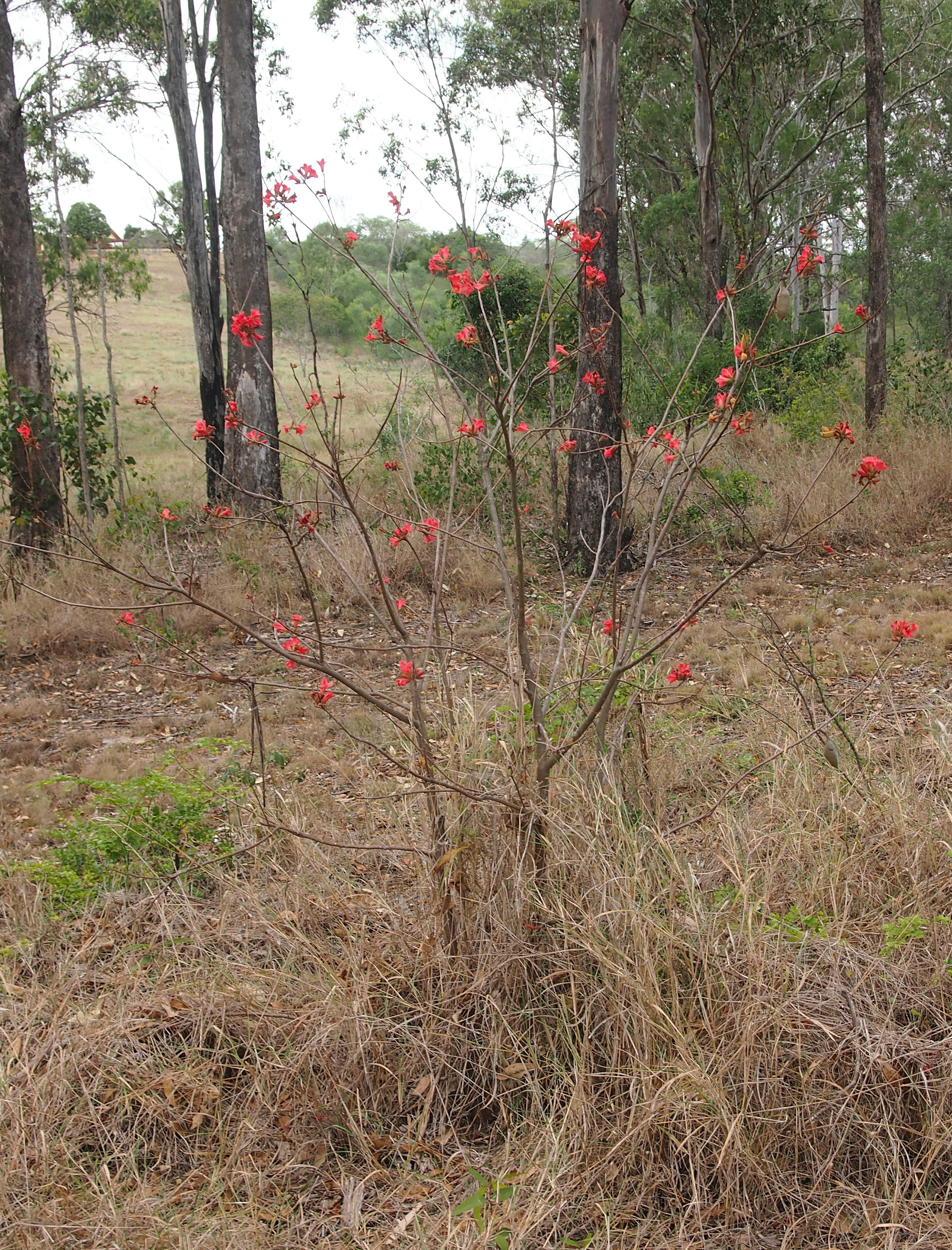
Bare tree in flower

Grown in USDA Zone 9–11 and in full sun, it is frost-resistant to at least −6 °C (21 °F), in addition to being drought tolerant from as young as a month old, since the plant develops tuberous roots. The plant does well with pruning and in pots, though heavy pruning may restrict flowering. Popular varieties include ‘Large Pink’ and ‘Large Red’. It is easily propagated by seed and grafting.

Its trunk, being covered in a corky bark, was used by Australian Aboriginals for canoes.
