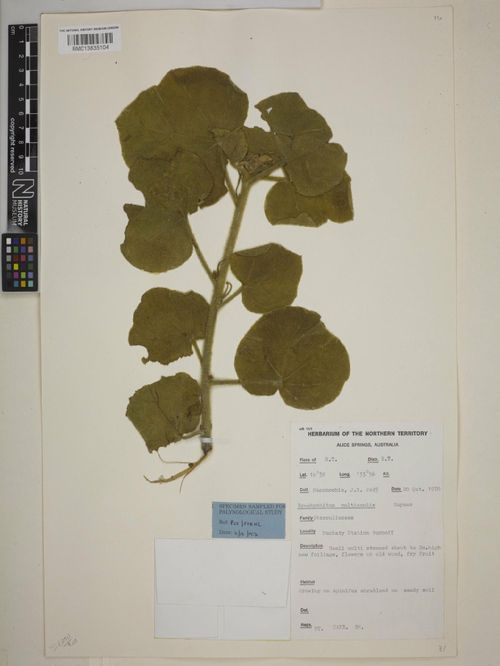
- Specimen BM013835104 (CC-BY 4.0 British Museum)

Conservation status
- Least Concern (TPWCA)

Scientific classification
- Kingdom: Plantae
- Clade: Tracheophytes
- Clade: Angiosperms
- Clade: Eudicots
- Clade: Rosids
- Order: Malvales
- Family: Malvaceae
- Genus: Brachychiton
- Species: B. multicaulis

Binomial name
- Brachychiton multicaulis Guymer

= Brachychiton multicaulis =

Species of tree

Brachychiton multicaulis is a tree of the genus Brachychiton (Note: The genus Brachychiton was traditionally placed in the family Sterculiaceae, but that family, along with Bombacaceae and Tiliaceae, has been found to be polyphyletic and is now sunk into a more broadly-defined Malvaceae) found in northern Australia. It was first described in 1988 by Gordon Guymer.

It is found only in the Northern Territory in the Tanami and southern Victoria River District, growing in open woodland on red sandy soils.
