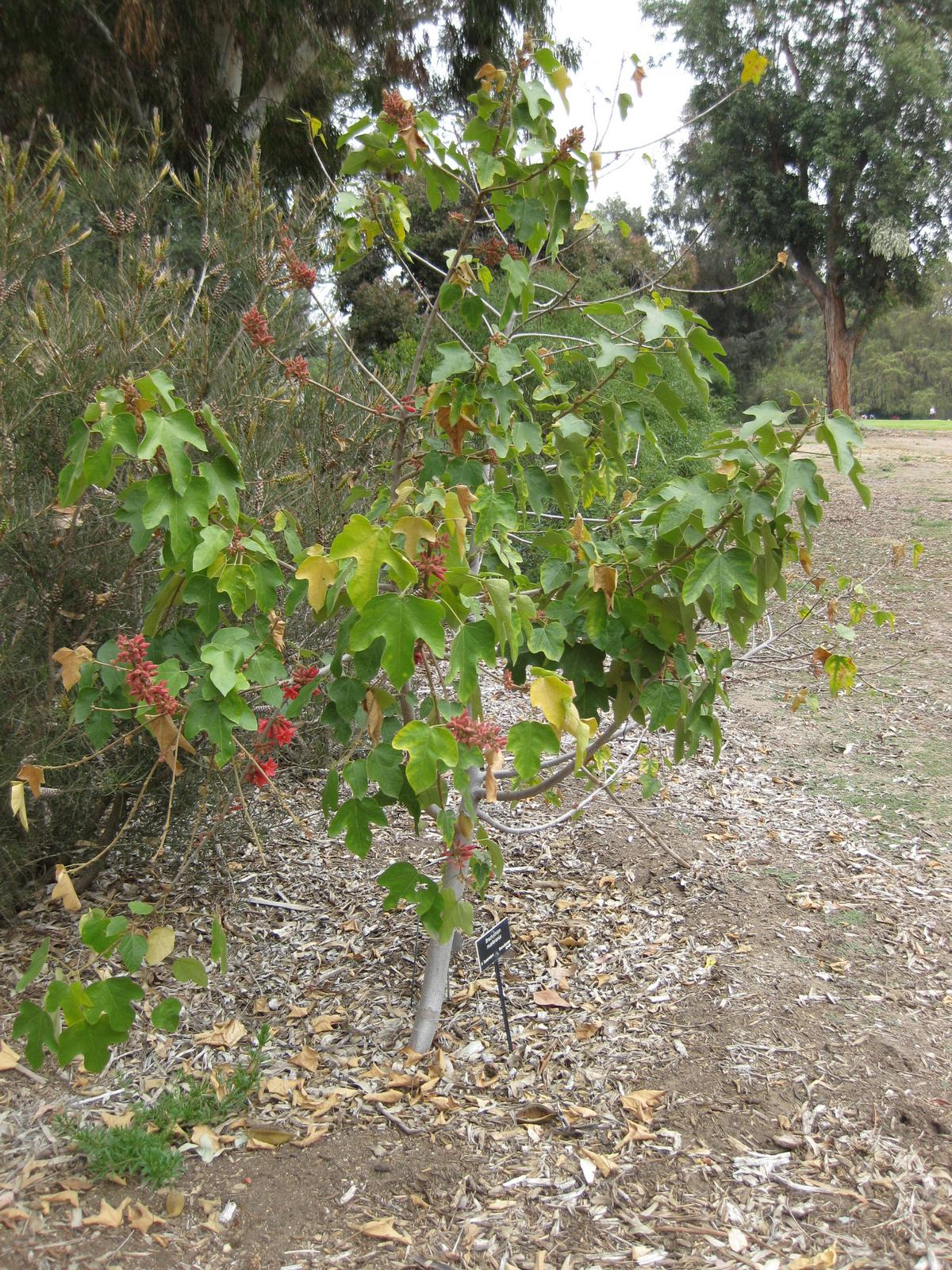
- Habit in Los Angeles

Scientific classification
- Kingdom: Plantae
- Clade: Tracheophytes
- Clade: Angiosperms
- Clade: Eudicots
- Clade: Rosids
- Order: Malvales
- Family: Malvaceae
- Genus: Brachychiton
- Species: B. muellerianus

Binomial name
- Brachychiton muellerianus Guymer, 1988

= Brachychiton muellerianus =

Species of plant

Brachychiton muellerianus is a species of Brachychiton found in Queensland, Australia.

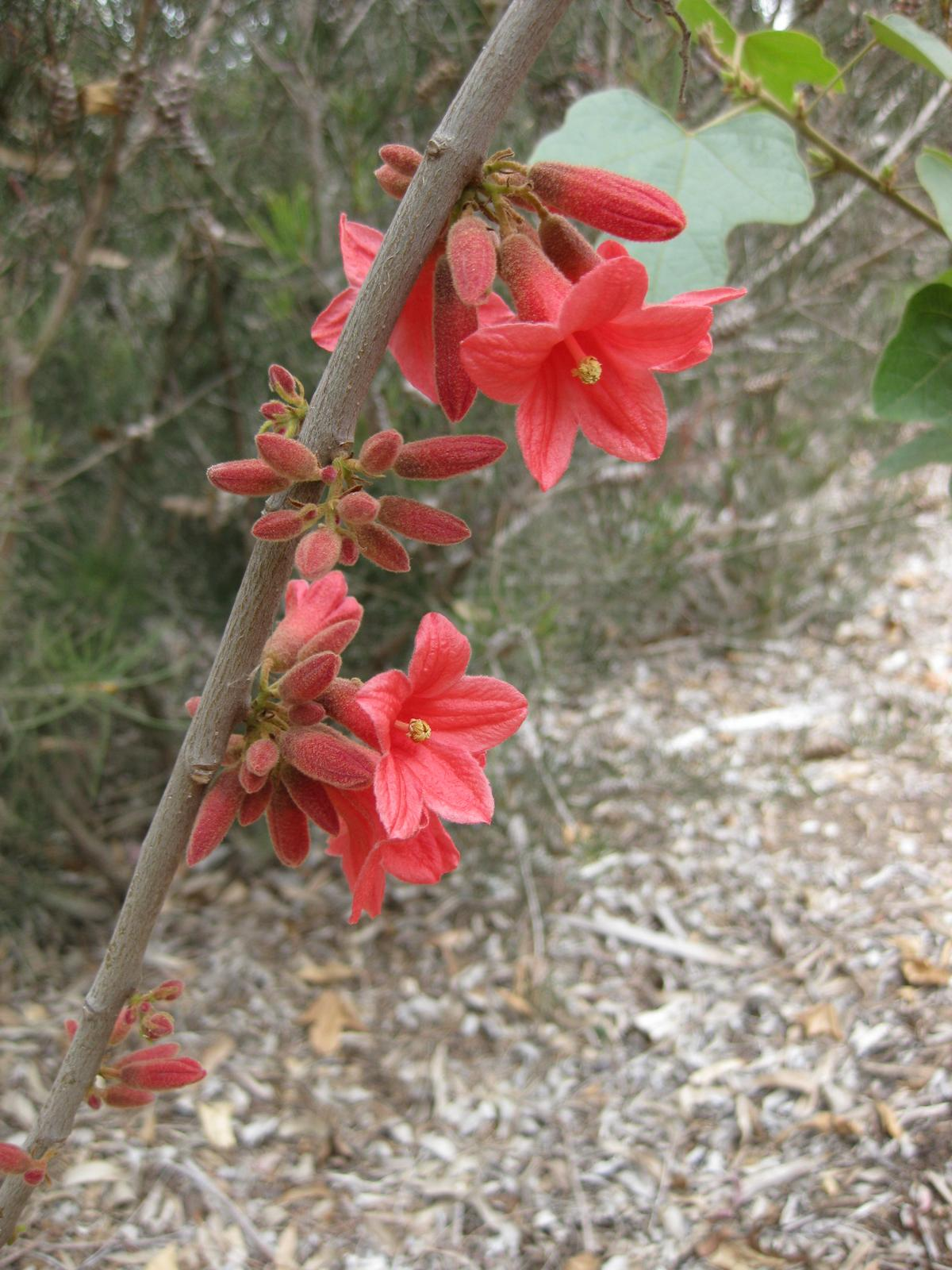
Flowers in Los Angeles
