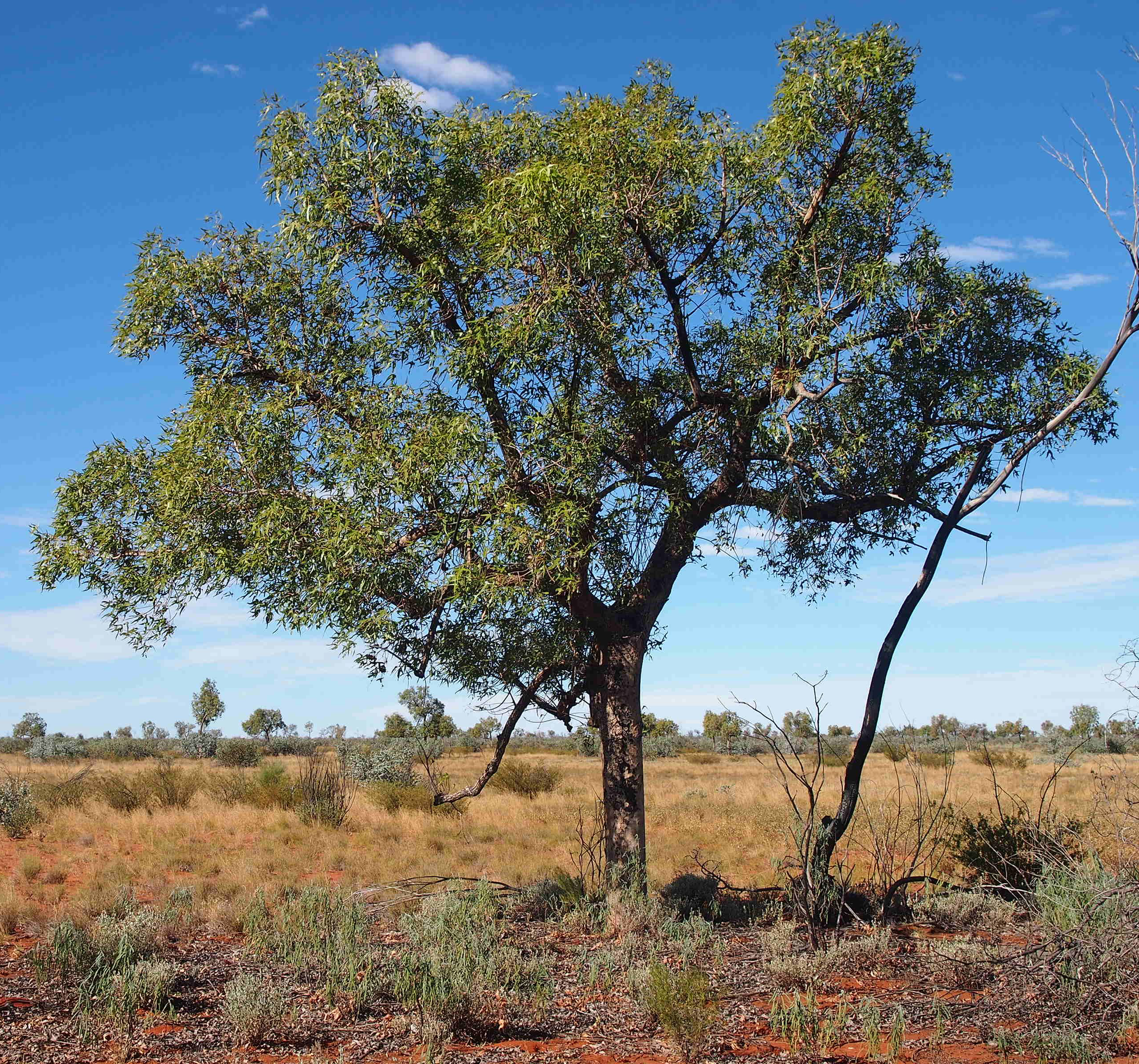

Scientific classification
- Kingdom: Plantae
- Clade: Tracheophytes
- Clade: Angiosperms
- Clade: Eudicots
- Clade: Rosids
- Order: Malvales
- Family: Malvaceae
- Genus: Brachychiton
- Species: B. gregorii

Binomial name
- Brachychiton gregorii F.Muell., 1862

= Brachychiton gregorii =

Desert kurrajong

Species of plant

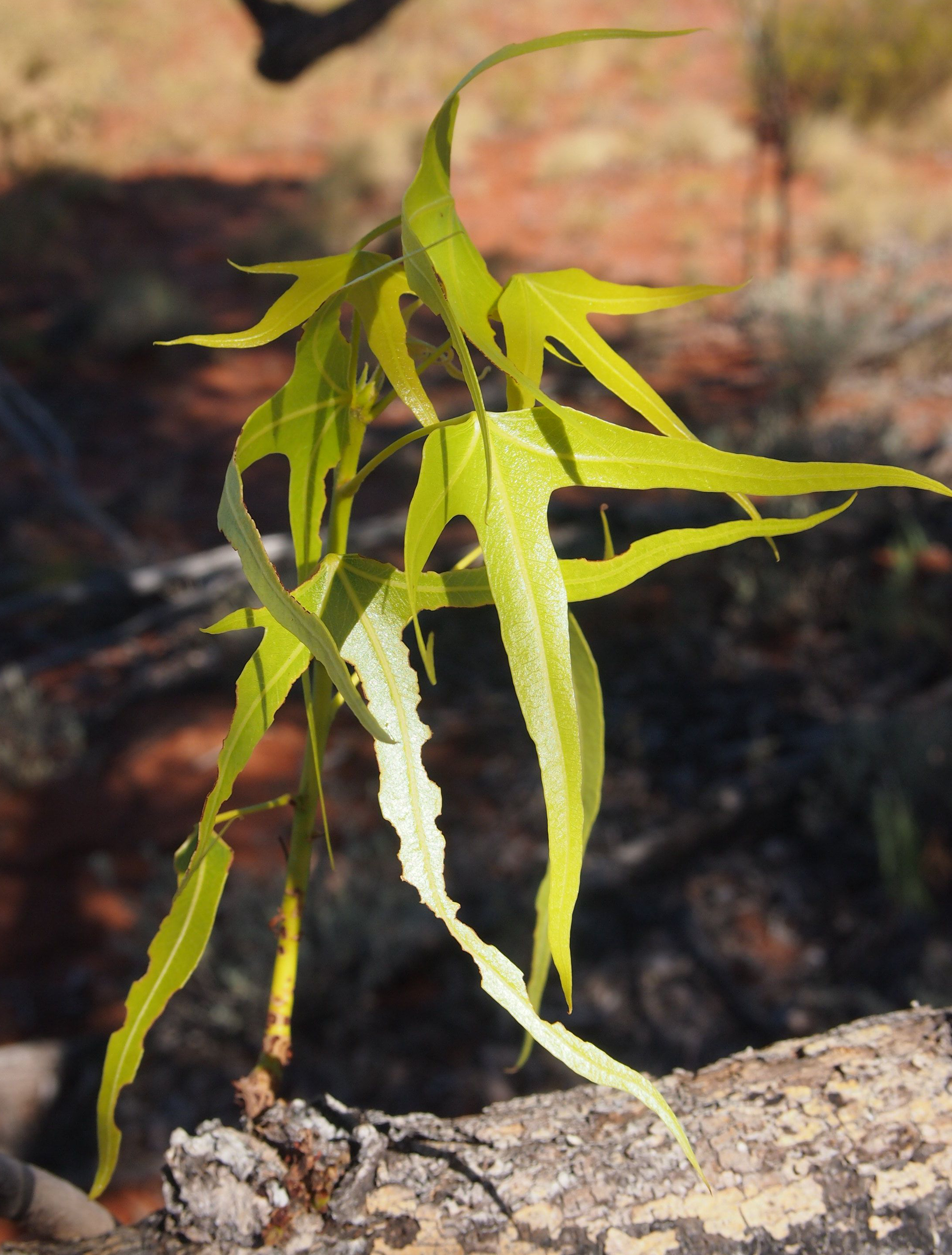
Brachychiton gregorii foliage

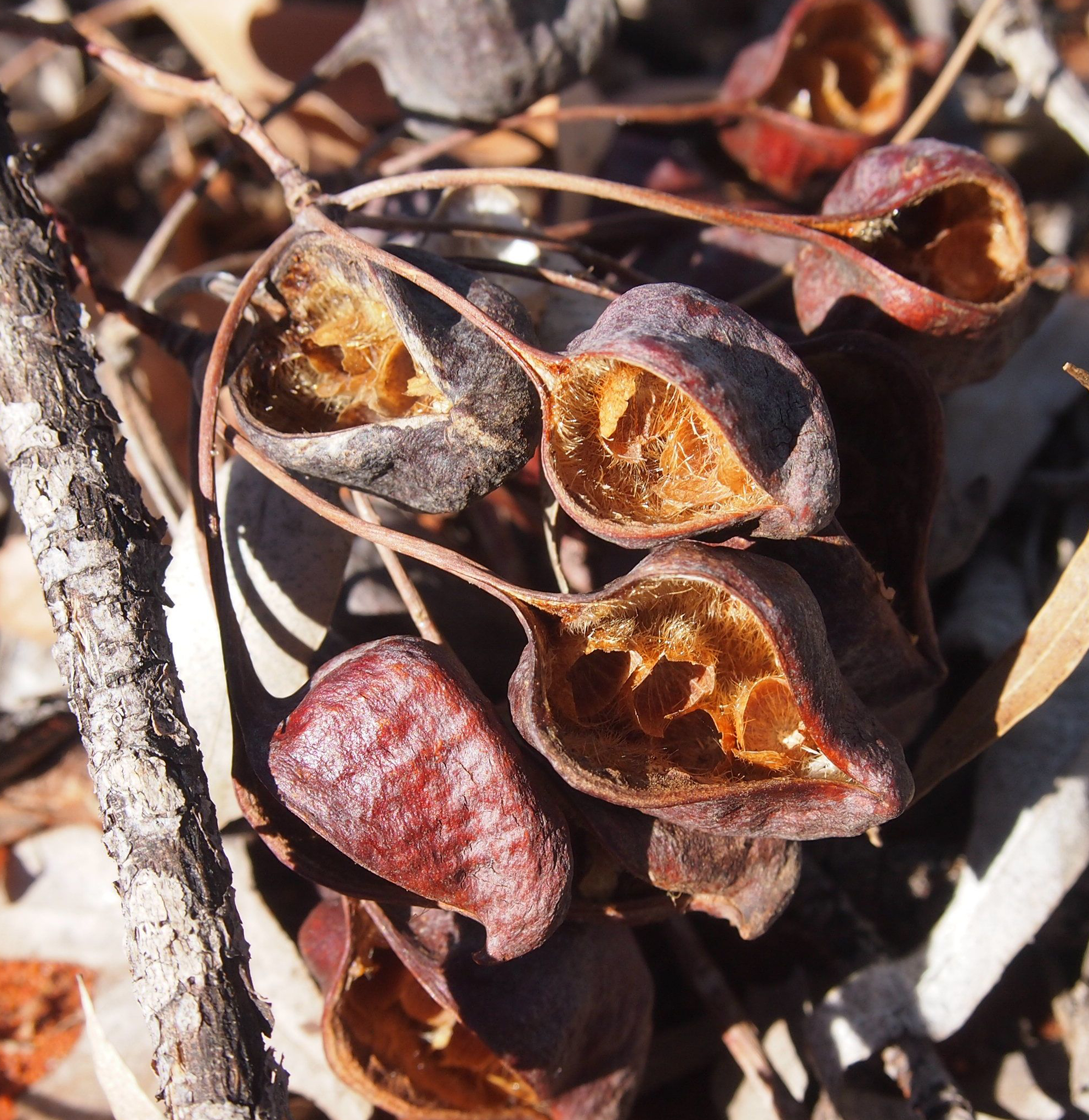
Brachychiton gregorii fruit

Brachychiton gregorii, commonly known as the desert kurrajong, is a small tree of the genus Brachychiton found in northern and western Australia. It was originally classified in the family Sterculiaceae, which is now within Malvaceae. (Note: The genus Brachychiton was traditionally placed in the family Sterculiaceae, but that family, along with Bombacaceae and Tiliaceae, has been found to be polyphyletic and is now sunk into a more broadly-defined Malvaceae)

== Taxonomy ==
The species was first formally described by the botanist Ferdinand von Mueller in 1862 as part of the work Thalamiflorae. The Plants Indigenous to the Colony of Victoria. Several synonyms exist for the plant including; Clompanus gregorii, Brachychiton acerifolius var. gregorii, Sterculia diversifolia var. occidentalis, Sterculia gregorii and Brachychiton populneus var. occidentalis.

The species name honours the explorer Augustus Charles Gregory who later became surveyor-general.

== Description ==
The tree typically grows to a height of around 3 to 12 metres (10 to 39 ft) with a canopy width of around 2 to 5 m (7 to 16 ft). The evergreen leaves reach up to 20 centimetres (8 in) in length and have three or five lobes on a long stalk. The leaves are shed in the dry months. It flowers between October and December producing inflorescences with bell-shaped pale-yellow flowers with a reddish margin. Following flowering black woody seed pods form that are up to around to 5 cm (2 in) in length and contain many seeds.

== Distribution ==
It has a scattered distribution in arid areas including the northwestern corner of South Australia, where it is found on rock ridges, slopes and sand dunes. It is also found in the Northern Territory and Western Australia, where it is scattered throughout the Goldfields, Pilbara and Mid West regions on red sandy or loamy soils.

== Ecology ==
Within its range, this tree is often associated with granite outcrops. The mistletoe Amyema benthamii is often found as a parasite on this species, introduced by a bird wiping its defecation on a branch, and this is eaten by the caterpillar phase of the moth species Comocrus behri.

== Uses ==
The tree is sold commercially in seed form or as a seedling. It is suitable for arid areas as it is drought resistant once established; it is moderately frost tolerant, and can grow in full sun or part shade in well-drained soils. It forms a large tuber from a young age and can be cultivated as a succulent bonsai.

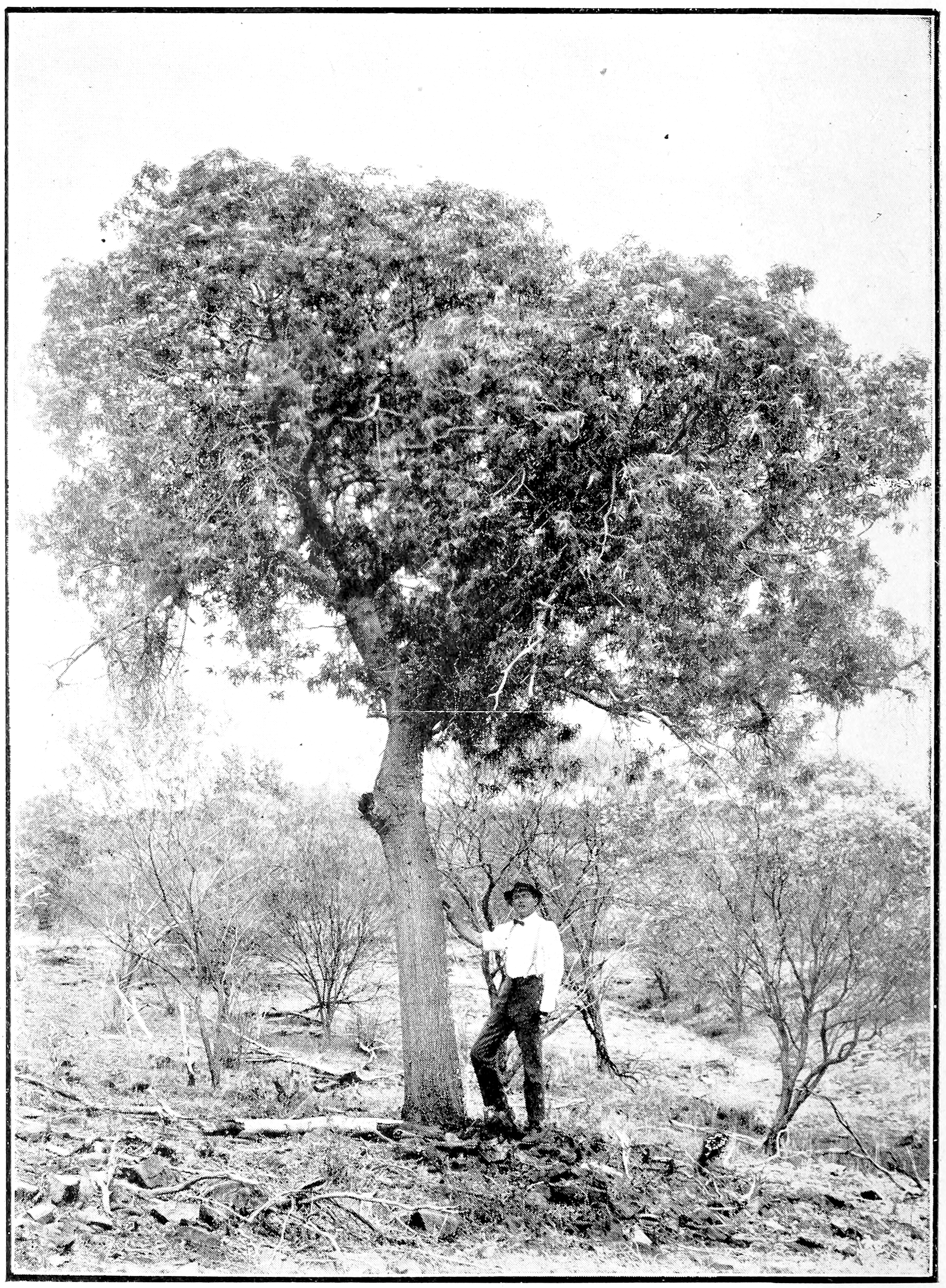
Mature tree in Western Australia, circa 1920

The wood is spongy, making it suitable for use as wood pulp. The low height and much divided branches produce a dense crown that gives good shade. A strong fibre can be obtained from the cambium layer.
