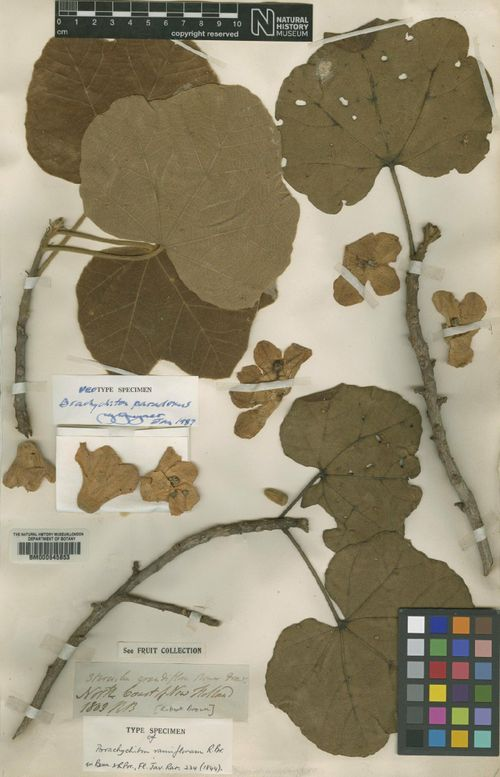
- BM000645853 (image CC-BY 4.0, British Museum)

Scientific classification
- Kingdom: Plantae
- Clade: Tracheophytes
- Clade: Angiosperms
- Clade: Eudicots
- Clade: Rosids
- Order: Malvales
- Family: Malvaceae
- Genus: Brachychiton
- Species: B. paradoxus

Binomial name
- Brachychiton paradoxus Schott & Endl.

= Brachychiton paradoxus =

Red-flowered kurrajong

Species of plant

Brachychiton paradoxus, commonly known as the red-flowered kurrajong, is a small tree of the genus Brachychiton found in northern Australia. It was originally classified in the family Sterculiaceae, which is now within Malvaceae. (Note: The genus Brachychiton was traditionally placed in the family Sterculiaceae, but that family, along with Bombacaceae and Tiliaceae, has been found to be polyphyletic and is now sunk into a more broadly-defined Malvaceae)

The tree was first described in 1832 by Heinrich Wilhelm Schott and Stephan Endlicher.
