= Queensland Herbarium =

The Queensland Herbarium (Index Herbariorum code: BRI) is situated at the Brisbane Botanic Gardens, Mount Coot-tha, in Brisbane, Queensland, Australia. It is part of Queensland's Department of Environment and Science. It is responsible for discovering, describing, monitoring, modelling, surveying, naming and classifying Queensland's plants, and is the focus for information and research on the state's flora, fauna and plant communities.

== Origins ==
The history of the Herbarium as an institution starts in 1855 with the appointment of Walter Hill as Superintendent of the Brisbane Botanic Gardens, four years before Queensland separated from New South Wales as a colony. In 1859, with Separation, Hill was appointed Colonial Botanist as well as remaining Director of the Gardens, a position he was to hold until 1881.

At the time the main function of colonial botanic gardens was usually to facilitate the introduction of suitable economic plants, although native plants would be collected as well. However, Hill's successor as Colonial Botanist was Frederick Manson Bailey, an established botanist already in charge of the herbarium at the Queensland Museum. Bailey remained in office for 34 years, until his death in 1915, and energetically worked at building up the herbarium collection through correspondence, exchange and numerous expeditions throughout the state.

Since 1855 the herbarium collection has been housed in five different places, and its botanical library in six. In 1998 the Herbarium moved to its current site within the Mount Coot-tha Botanic Gardens. As at 30 May 2025, the number of plant specimens in the collection is over 911,000, mainly from Queensland.

== Herbarium directors ==
Over the years, the Herbarium has gone through numerous departmental reorganizations and the officer in charge has been known by a variety of titles, from Colonial Botanist through Government Botanist, Director and Chief Botanist:

- 1855–1881 – Walter Hill
- 1881–1915 – Frederick Manson Bailey
- 1915–1917 – John Frederick Bailey
- 1917–1950 – Cyril Tenison White
- 1950–1954 – William Douglas Francis
- 1954–1976 – Selwyn L. Everist
- 1976–1990 – Robert W. Johnson
- 1990–1994 – (no head)
- 1994–2022 – Gordon P. Guymer
- 2022–present – Gillian Brown

== Unfortunate incident ==
On 8 May 2017, The Guardian revealed that 105 herbarium plates dating from the middle of the 19th century were destroyed by Australian customs officers indiscriminately enforcing Australian laws aimed at preventing the introduction of invasive species. The plates had been loaned for study by the French Muséum national d'histoire naturelle to the Queensland Herbarium. Michel Guiraud, director of the French Muséum's collections, described the destruction as an irreplaceable loss as it included six type specimens which are used to describe a plant species.
