= Gordon P. Guymer =

Australian botanist

Gordon Paul Guymer (born 1953) is an Australian botanist. From 1994 to 2022, Guymer was the director of the Queensland Herbarium. He served as the Australian Botanical Liaison Officer at the Royal Botanic Gardens in London, England in 1986–1987.

== See also ==
Taxa named by Gordon P. Guymer
