= Thalamiflorae =

Thalamiflorae is a historical grouping of dicotyledons, arranged in the De Candolle system and in the Bentham and Hooker system. This group was named and published well before internationally accepted rules for botanical nomenclature. In these systems, a family was indicated as "ordo", and modern rules of botanical nomenclature accept that as meaning a family rather than an order.^{[Article 18.2]} Family names have also since been standardized (most family names now end in -aceae).

== Previous group ==
Polypetalae. Dome-shaped plants with unexpanded flower receptacle (thalamus), polysepalous, hypogynous with a superior ovary.

== Thalamiflorae detailed view of subclass ==
Within the dicotyledons ("classis prima Dicotyledoneae") the systems recognize this as subclass 1. Thalamiflorae. The full Ordo, Tribe and genera are shown below

Ordo 1. Ranunculaceae

Tribe 1. Clematideae

Genus: Clematis, Naravelia

Tribe 2. Anemoneae

Genus: Thalictrum, Tetractis, Anemone, Hepática, Hydrastis, Knowltonia, Adonis, Hamadryas

Tribe 3. Ranunculeae

Genus: Myosurus, Ceratocephalus, Ranunculus, Ficaria

Tribe 4. Helleboreae

Genus: Caltha, Trollius, Isopyrum, Enemion, Garidella, Nigella, Aquilegia, Delphinium, Aconitum, e outros.

Tribe 5. Paeoniaceae

Genus: Actaea, Zanthorhiza, Paeonia.

Ordo 2. Dilleniaceae

Tribe 1. Delimeae

Genus: Tetracera, Davilla, Doliocarpus, Delima, Curatella, Trachytella, Recchia

Tribe 2. Dilleneae

Genus: Pachinema, Hemistemma, Pleurandra, Candollea, Adrastaea, Hibbertia, Wormia, Colbertia, Dillenia

Ordo 3. Magnoliaceae

Tribe 1. Illicieae

Genus: Illicium, Temus, Drimys, Tasmannia

Tribe 2. Magnolieae

Genus: Mayna, Michelia, Magnólia, Talauma, Liriodendron

Ordo 4. Annonaceae

Genus: Kadsusa, Annona, Monodora, Asimina, Porcelia, Uvaria, Unona, Xylopia, Guatteria.

Ordo 5. Menispermaceae

Tribe 1. Lardizabaleae

Genus: Lardizabala, Stauntonia, Burasaia

Tribe 2. Menispermeae

Genus: Spirospermum, Cocculus, Pselium, Cissampelos, Menispermum, Abuta, Trichoa, Agdestis

Tribe 3. Schizandreae

Genus: Schisandra

Ordo 6. Berberideae

Genus: Berberis, Mahonia, Nandina, Leontice, Epimedium, Diphylleia

Ordo 7. Podophyllaceae

Tribe 1. Podophylleae

Genus: Podophyllum, Jeffersonia, Achlys

Tribe 2. Hydropeltideae

Genus: Cabomba, Hydropeltis

Ordo 8. Nymphaeaceae

Tribe 1. Nelumboneae

Genus: Nelumbium

Tribe 2. Nymphaeeae

Genus: Euryale ferox, Nymphaea, Nuphar

Ordo 9. Papaveraceae

Genus: Papaver, Argemone, Meconopsis, Sanguinária, Bocconia, Roemeria, Glaucium, Chelidonium, Hypecoum

Ordo 10. Fumariaceae

Genus: Diclytra, Adlumia, Cysticaptnos, Corydalis, Sarcocapnos, Fumaria

Ordo 11. Cruciferae

Sub-ordo 1. Pleurorhizeae

Tribe 1. Arabideae

Genus: Mathiola, Cheiranthus, Nasturtium, Leptocarpaea, Notoceras, Barbarea, Stevenia, Braya, Turritis, Arabis, Macropodium, Cardamine, Pteroneurum, Dentaria, Neuroloma

Tribe 2. Alyssineae

Genus: Lunaria, Savignya, Ricotia, Farsetia, Berteroa, Aubrieta, Versicaria, Schivereckia, Alyssum, Meniocus, Clypeola, Peltaria, Petrocallis, Draba, Erophila, Cochlearia

Tribe 3. Thlaspideae

Genus: Thlaspi, Capsella, Hutchinsia, Teesdalia, Iberis, Biscutella, Megacarpaea, Cremolobus, Menonvillea

Tribe 4. Euclidieae

Genus: Euclidium, Ochthodium, Pugionium

Tribe 5. Anastaticeae

Genus: Anastatica, Morettia

Tribe 6. Cakilineae

Genus: Cakile, Cordylocarpus, Chorispora

Sub-ordo 2. Notorhizeae

Tribe 7. Sisymbreae

Genus: Malcomia, Hesperis, Andreoskia, Sisymbrium, Alliaria, Erysimum, Leptaleum, Stanleya

Tribe 8. Camelineae

Genus: Stenopetalum, Camelina, Eudema, Neslia

Tribe 9. Lepidineae

Genus: Senebiera, Lepidium, Bivonaea, Eunomia, Aethionema

Tribe 10. Isatideae

Genus: Aphragmus, Tauscheria, Isatis, Myagrum, Sobolewskia

Tribe 11. Anchonieae

Genus: Goldbachia, Anchonium, Sterigma

Sub-ordo 3. Orthoploceae

Tribe 12. Brassiceae

Genus: Brassica, Sinapis, Moricandia, Diplotaxis, Eruca

Tribe 13. Velleae

Genus: Vella, Boleum, Carrichtera, Succowia

Tribe 14. Psychineae

Genus: Schouwia, Psychine

Tribe 15. Zilleae

Genus: Zilla, Muricaria, Calepina

Tribe 16. Raphaneae

Genus: Crambe, Rapistrum, Didesmus, Enarthrocarpus, Raphanus

Sub-ordo 4. Spirolobeae

Tribe 17. Buniadeae

Genus: Bunias

Tribe 18. Erucariae

Genus: Erucaria

Sub-ordo 5. Diplecolobeae

Tribe 19. Heliophileae

Genus: Chamira, Heliophila

Tribe 20. Subularieae

Genus: Subularia

Tribe 21. Brachycarpeae

Genus: Brachycarpaea

Ordo 12. Capparideae

Tribe 1. Cleomeae

Genus: Cleomella, Peritoma, Gynandropsis, Cleome, Polanisia

Tribe 2. Cappareae

Genus: Crataeva, Niebuhria, Boscia, Cadaba, Schepperia, Sodada, Capparis, Stephania, Morisonia, Thylachium, Hermupoa, Maerua

Ordo 13. Flacourtianeae

Tribe 1. Patrisieae

Genus: Ryanaea, Patrisia

Tribe 2. Flacourtieae

Genus: Flacourtia, Roumea, Stigmarota

Tribe 3. Kiggelarieae

Genus: Kiggelaria, Melicytus, Hydnocarpus

Tribe 4. Erythrospermeae

Genus: Erythrospermum

Ordo 14. Bixineae

Genus: Bixa, Banara, Laetia, Prockia, Ludia, Azara

Ordo 15. Cistineae

Genus: Cistus, Helianthemum, Hudsonia, Lechea

Ordo 16. Violarieae

Tribe 1. Violeae

Genus: Calyptrion, Noisettia, Glossarrhen, Viola, Solea, Pombalia, Pigea, Ionidium, Hybanthus

Tribe 2. Alsodineae

Genus: Conohoria, Rinorea, Alsodeia, Ceranthera, Pentaloba, Lavradia, Physiphora, Hymenanthera

Tribe 3. Sauvageae

Genus: Sauvagesia, Piparea

Ordo 17. Droseraceae

Genus: Drosera, Aldrovanda, Romanzowia, Byblis, Roridula, Drosophyllum, Dionaea, Parnassia

Ordo 18. Polygaleae

Genus: Polygala, Salomonia, Comesperma, Badiera, Soulamea, Muraltia, Mundia, Monnina, Bredemeyera

Ordo 19. Tremandreae

Genus: Tetratheca, Tremandra

Ordo 20. Pittosporeae

Genus: Billardiera, Pittosporum, Bursaria, Senacia

Ordo 21. Frankeniaceae

Genus: Frankenia, Beatsonia, Luxemburgia

Ordo 22. Caryophylleae

Tribe 1. Sileneae

Genus: Gypsophila, Banffya, Dianthus, Saponaria, Cucubalus, Silene, Lychnis, Velezia, Drypis

Tribe 2. Alsineae

Genus: Ortegia, Gouffeia, Buffonia, Sagina, Hymenella, Moehringia, Elatine, Bergia, Mollugo, Physa, Holosteum, Spergula, Larbrea, Drymaria, Stellaria, Arenaria, Cerastium, Cherleria, Spergulastrum, Hydropityon

Ordo 23. Lineae

Genus: Linum, Radiola

Ordo 24. Malvaceae

Genus: Malope, Malva, Kitaibelia, Althaea, Lavatera, Malachra, Urena, Pavonia, Malvaviscus, Lebretonia, Hibiscus, Thespesia, Gossypium, Redoutea, Fugosia, Senra, Lopimia, Palavia, Cristaria, Anoda, Periptera, Sida, Lagunea, Ingenhouzia

Ordo 25. Bombaceae

Genus: Helicteres, Myrodia, Plagianthus, Matisia, Pourretia, Montezuma, Ophelus, Adansonia, Carolinea, Bombax, Eriodendron, Chorisia, Durio, Ochroma, Cheirostemon

Ordo 26. Byttneriaceae

Tribe 1. Sterculieae

Genus: Sterculia, Triphaca, Heritiera

Tribe 2. Byttnerieae

Genus: Theobroma, Abroma, Guazuma, Glossostemon, Commersonia, Byttneria, Ayenia, Kleinhovia

Tribe 3. Lasiopetaleae

Genus: Seringia, Lasiopetalum, Guichenotia, Thomasia, Keraudrenia

Tribe 4. Hermannieae

Genus: Melochia, Riedleia, Waltheria, Altheria, Hermannia, Mahernia

Tribe 5. Dombeyaceae

Genus: Ruizia, Pentapetes, Assonia, Dombeya, Melhania, Trochetia, Pterospermum, Astrapaea, Kydia, Gluta

Tribe 6. Wallichieae

Genus: Eriolaena, Wallichia, Goethea

Ordo 27. Tiliaceae

Genus: Sparrmannia, Abatia, Heliocarpus, Anthichorus, Corchorus, Honckenya, Triumfetta, Grewia, Columbia, Tilia, Diplophractum, Muntingia, Apeiba, Sloanea, Ablania, Gyrostemon, Christiana, Alegria, Luhea, Vatica, Espera, Wikstroemia, Berrya

Ordo 28. Elaeocarpeae

Genus: Elaeocarpus, Aceratium, Dicera, Friesia, Vallea, Tricuspidaria, Decadia

Ordo 29. Chlenaceae

Genus: Sarcolaena, Leptolaena, Schizolaena, Rhodolaena, Hugonia

Ordo 30. Ternstroemiaceae

Tribe 1. Ternstroemieae

Genus: Ternstroemia

Tribe 2. Freziereae

Genus: Cleyera, Freziera, Eurya, Lettsomia

Tribe 3. Sauraujeae

Genus: Saurauja, Apatelia

Tribe 4. Laplaceae

Genus: Cochlospermum, Laplacea, Ventenatia

Tribe 5. Gordonieae

Genus: Malachodendron, Stewartia, Gordonia

Ordo 31. Camellieae

Genus: Camellia

Ordo 32. Olacineae

Genus: Olax, Spermaxyrum, Fissilia, Heisteria, Ximenia, Pseudaleia, Pseudaleioides, Icacina

Ordo 33. Aurantiaceae

Genus: Atalantia, Triphasia, Limonia, Cookia, Murraya, Aglaia, Bergera, Clausena, Glycosmis, Feronia, Aegle, Citrus

Ordo 34. Hypericineae

Sub-ordo 1. Hypericineae verae

Tribe 1. Vismieae

Genus: Haronga, Vismia

Tribe 2. Hypericeae

Genus: Androszemum, Hypericum, Lancretia, Ascyrum

Sub-ordo 2. Hypericineae anomalae

Genus: Carpodontos, Eucryphia

Ordo 35. Guttiferae

Tribe 1. Clusieae

Genus: Mahurea, Marila, Godoya, Clusia

Tribe 2. Garcinieae

Genus: Marialva, Micranthera, Garcinia

Tribe 3. Calophylleae

Genus: Mammea, Stalagmitis, Mesua, Calophyllum

Tribe 4. Symphonieae

Genus: Canella, Moronobea, Chrysopia, Macanea, Singana, Rheedia, Macoubea, Chloromyron

Ordo 36. Marcgraviaceae

Sub-ordo 1. Marcgravieae

Genus: Antholoma, Marcgravia

Sub-ordo 2. Noranteae

Genus: Norantea, Ruyschia

Ordo 37. Hippocrateaceae

Genus: Hippocratea, Anthodon, Raddisia, Salacia, Johnia, Trigonia, Lacepedea

Ordo 38. Erythroxyleae

Genus: Erythroxylum, Sethia

Ordo 39. Malpighiaceae

Tribe 1. Malpighieae

Genus: Malpighia, Byrsonima, Bunchosia, Galphimia, Caucanthus

Tribe 2. Hiptageae

Genus: Hiptage, Tristellateia, Thryallis, Aspicarpa, Gaudichaudia, Camarea

Tribe 3. Banisterieae

Genus: Hiraea, Triopteris, Tetrapteris, Banisteria, Heteropteris, Niota

Ordo 40. Acerineae

Genus: Acer, Negundo

Ordo 41. Hippocastaneae

Genus: Aesculus, Pavia

Ordo 42. Rhizoboleae

Genus: Caryocar

Ordo 43. Sapindaceae

Tribe 1. Paullinieae

Genus: Cardiospermum, Urvillaea, Serjania, Paullinia

Tribe 2. Sapindeae

Genus: Sapindus, Blighia, Talisia, Matayba, Aporetica, Schmidelia, Euphoria, Thouinia, Toulicia, Cupania, Tina, Cossignia, Hypelate, Melicocca, Stadmannia

Tribe 3. Dodonaeaceae

Genus: Koelreuteria, Amirola, Dodonaea, Alectryon, Eystathes, Racaria, Valentinia, Pedicellia, Ratonia, Enourea

Ordo 44. Meliaceae

Tribe 1. Melieae

Genus: Ceruma, Humiria, Turraea, Quivisia, Strigilia, Sandoricum, Melia

Tribe 2. Trichilieae

Genus: Trichilia, Ekebergia, Guarea, Heynea

Tribe 3. Cedreleae

Genus: Cedrela, Swietenia, Chloroxylon, Flindersia, Carapa

Ordo 45. Ampelideae

Tribe 1. Viniferae (Sarmentaceae)

Genus: Cissus, Ampelopsis, Vitis

Tribe 2. Leeaceae

Genus: Leea, Lasianthera

Ordo 46. Geraniaceae

Genus: Rhynchotheca, Monsonia, Geranium, Erodium, Pelargonium

Ordo 47. Tropaeoleae

Genus: Tropaeolum

Ordo 48. Balsamineae

Genus: Balsamina, Impatiens

Ordo 49. Oxalideae

Genus: Averrhoa, Biophytum, Oxalis, Ledocarpum

Ordo 50. Zygophylleae

Genus: Tribulus, Fagonia, Larrea, Zygophyllum, Gualacum, Porlieria, Chitonia, Biebersteunia, Melianthus, Balanites

Ordo 51. Rutaceae

Tribe 1. Diosmeae

Genus: Ruta, Peganum, Dictamnus, Calodendrum, Diosma, Empleurum, Diplolaena, Correa, Phebalium, Crowea, Eriostemon, Philotheca, Boronia, Cyminosma, Zieria, Melicope, Elaphrium, Choisya, Evodia, Zanthoxylum, Pilocarpus, Spiranthera, Almeidea

Tribe 2. Cusparieae

Genus: Monniera, Ticorea, Galipea, Erythrochiton, Diglottis, Barraldeia, Hortia

Ordo 52. Simarubeae

Genus: Quassia, Simaruba, Simaba, Raputia

Ordo 53. Ochnaceae

Genus: Ochna, Comphia, Walkera, Elvasia, Castela

Ordo 54. Coriarieae

Genus: Coriaria
