= Giuseppe Moretti (botanist) =

Italian botanist (1782–1853)

Giuseppe Moretti (30 November 1782 in Roncaro – 1 December 1853) was an Italian botanist.

He served as a professor of botany and as director of the botanical gardens at the University of Pavia (1826–1853). The genus Morettia (family Brassicaceae) was named in his honor by Augustin Pyramus de Candolle in 1821.

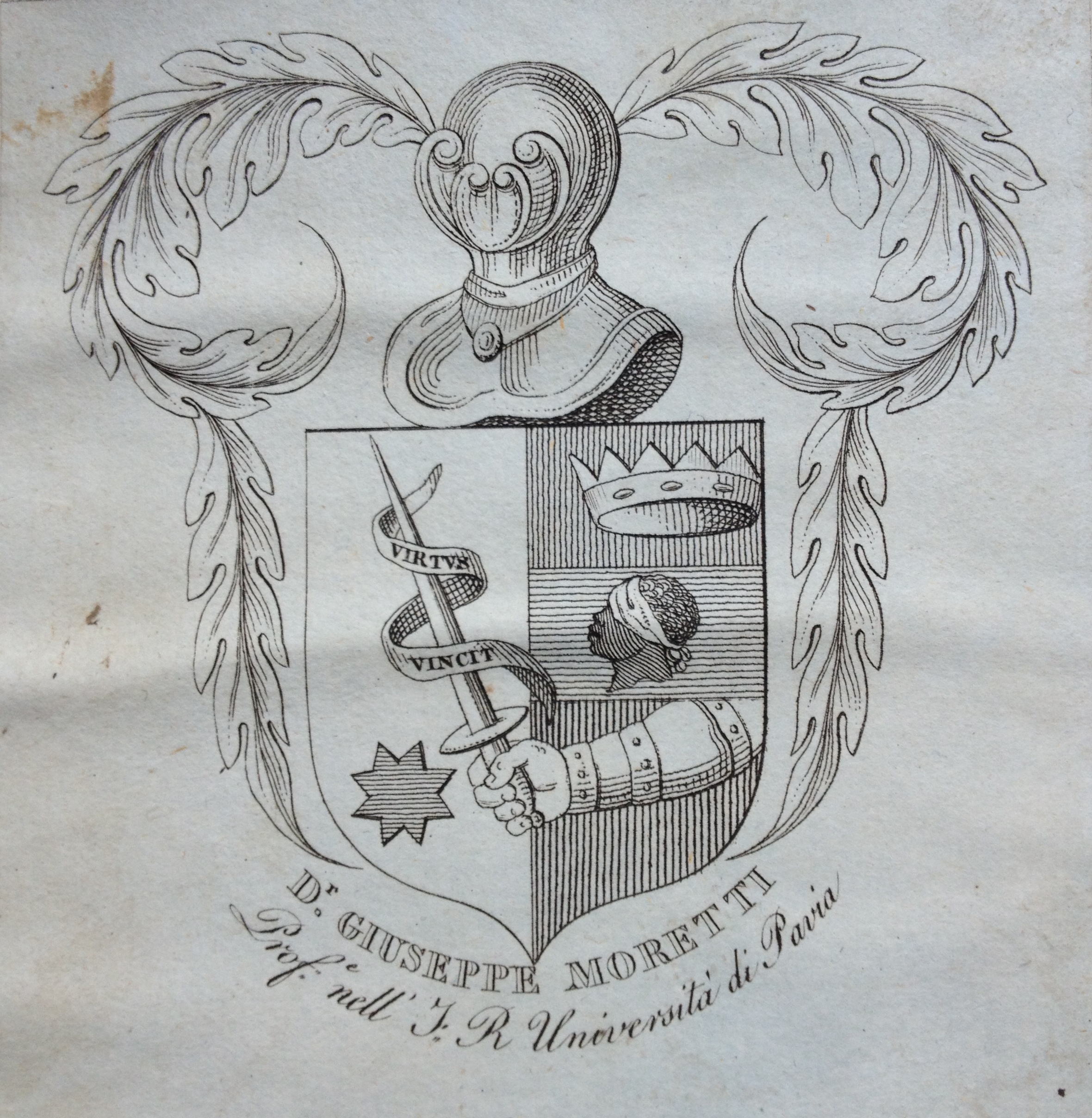
Giuseppe Moretti's ex libris

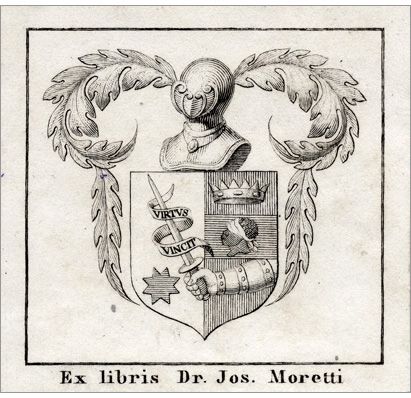
Giuseppe Moretti's ex libris

== Published works ==
- Osservazioni sopra diverse specie di piante indigene dell'Italia, 1818.
- Il botanico italiano, ossia, Discussioni sulla flora italica, 1826.
- Prodromo di una monografia delle specie del genere Morus, 1842
- Sugli Anacardi orientale e occidentale (Semecarpus anacardium, Linn. fil. et Anacardium occidentale, Linn.), 1851.
