= Pierre Joseph Garidel =

French botanist

Pierre-Joseph Garibel
- Born: 1 August 1658; Manosque, Provence (French province), France
- Died: 6 June 1737 (aged 78); Aix-en-Provence, Provence, France
- Education: University of Aix-en-Provence
- Occupation: Physician
- Parent(s): Pierre Garidel; Louise de Barthelemy
- Relatives: Joseph Lieutaud (nephew)

Pierre Joseph Garidel (French pronunciation: [pjɛʁ ʒozɛf ɡaʁidɛl]; 1 August 1658 – 6 June 1737) was a French botanist.

== Early life ==
Pierre-Joseph Garidel was born on 1 August 1658 in Manosque. His father was Pierre Garidel, a lawyer, and his mother, Louise de Barthelemy. He studied medicine at the University of Aix-en-Provence and the University of Montpellier.

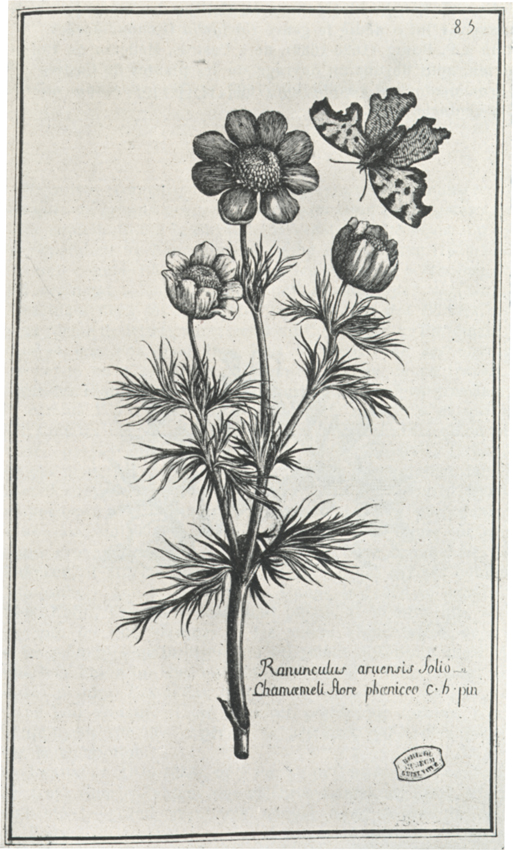
Ranunculus arvensis, taken from Histoire des plantes qui naissent aux environs d'Aix (1715).

== Career ==
He became a professor of botany at the Aix-en-Provence. Together with Joseph Pitton de Tournefort, he studied plants from Provence. Meanwhile, he called on the French nobility to take up botany as a hobby alongside hunting.

In 1735, he published, Histoire des plantes qui naissent aux environs d'Aix et dans plusieurs autres endroits de la Provence, which describes 1,400 plants. In the preface, he writes about the history of botany in Provence and the medicinal uses of plants.

== Death ==
He died on 6 June 1737 in Aix-en-Provence.

== Legacy ==
The garidella, a subclass of the thalamiflorae, was named in his honour.
