= George Engelmann bibliography =

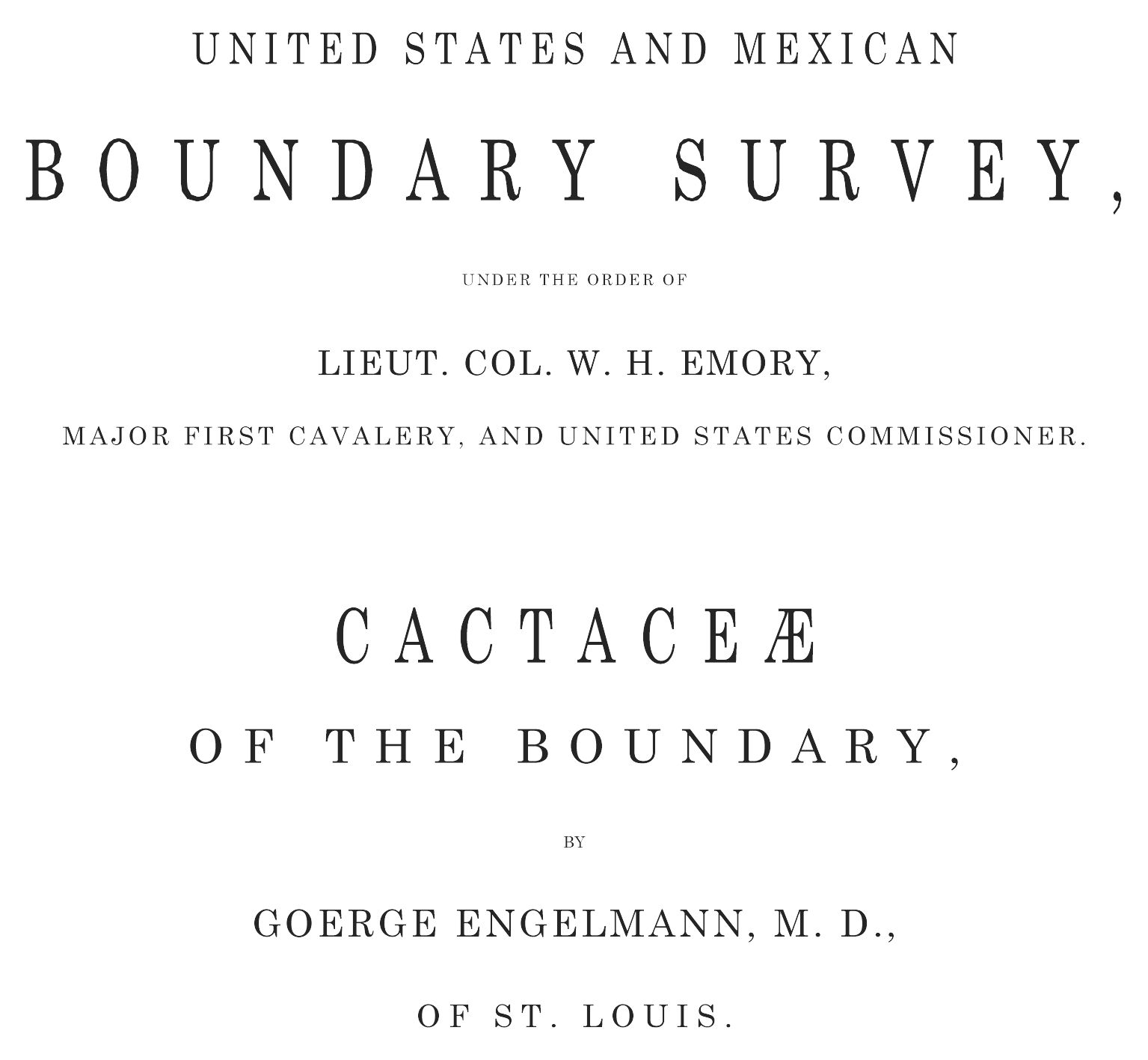
Engelmann's Cactaceae of the Boundary was published in 1859 and contains 76 full page illustrations of cacti.

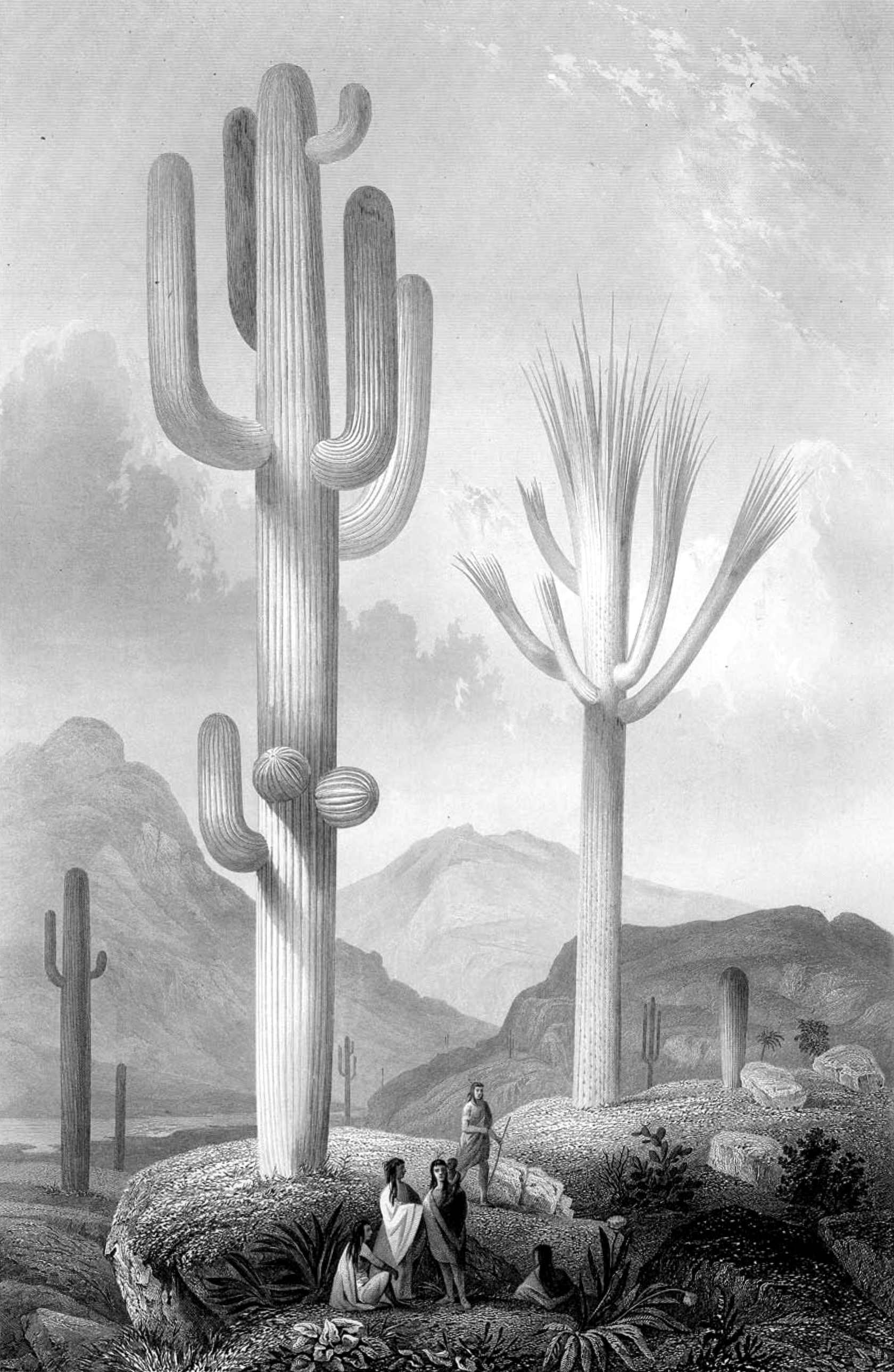
The frontispiece of Cactaceae of the Boundary shows a view along the Gila River with the cactus Carnegiea gigantea.

This George Engelmann bibliography provides an overview of works written by the 19th-century scientist George Engelmann. They appeared mostly in journals such as the London Journal of Botany, the Botanischen Zeitung, the Boston Journal of Natural History, the American Journal of Science and Arts, the Transactions of the Academy of Science of St. Louis, the Proceedings of the Academy of Natural Sciences of Philadelphia, the Bulletin of the Torrey Botanical Club, the American Naturalist, and the Botanical Gazette or the Gardeners' Chronicle.

== Botany ==
1830s

- De Antholysi Prodromus. Dissertatio inauguralis phytomorphologica. Frankfurt am Main 1832, (online).

1840s

- A Monography of North American Cuscutineae. In: American Journal of Science and Arts. Vol 43, 1842, P. 333–345, (online).
- Corrections and Additions to the Monography of Cuscutineae, in Vol. XLIII of this Journal. In: American Journal of Science and Arts. Vol 45, 1843, P. 73–77, (online).
- Extracts from a Monograph of the North American Cuscutineae. In: The London Journal of Botany. Vol 2, 1843, P. 184–199, (online).
- Ueber Cuscuta hassiaca. In: Botanische Zeitung. Vol 2, Number 32, 9. August 1844, P. 553–555, (online).
- A Monography of the North American species of the genus Equisetum by Prof. Alexander Braun, of Carlsruhe, germany; translated from the author's manuscript, and with some additions. In: American Journal of Science and Arts. Vol 46, 1844, P. 81–91, (online).
- A brief notice of the Charea of North America; by Alexander Braun. In: American Journal of Science and Arts. Vol 46, 1844, P. 92–93, (online).
- Catalogue of a collection of Plants made in Illinois and Missouri. by Charles A. Geyer; with critical remarks, &c. In: American Journal of Science and Arts. Vol 46, 1844, P. 94–104, (online).
- Plantae Lindheimerianae: An Enumeration of the Plants collected in Texas, and distributed to Subscribers, by F. Lindheimer, with Remarks, and Descriptions of new Species, &c. In: Boston Journal of Natural History. Vol 5, 1845, P. 210–264, (online). - with Asa Gray
- Bemerkungen über Cuscuten. In: Botanische Zeitung. Vol 4, Number 16, 17. April 1846, P. 273–280, (online).
- On the North American Species of Isoetes and Marsilea; by Prof. A. Braun. In: American Journal of Science and Arts. 2. Folge, Vol 3, 1847, P. 52–56, (online).
- ??? Anmerkungen über einige Farrenkräuter der Vereinigten Staaten. In: G. Kunze: Die Farrenkräuter in colorirten Abbildungen &c. In: Botanische Zeitung. Vol 5, S. 621–630, (online) – with Alexander Braun
- Notes on some Ferns of the United States; by Professor Kunze of Leipzic. In: American Journal of Science and Arts. 2. Folge, Vol 6, 1848, S. 80–89, (online).
- Botanical Appendix. In: Friedrich Adolph Wislizenus: Memoir of a Tour to Northern Mexico: Connected with Col. Doniphan's Expedition, in 1846 and 1847. Tippin & Streeper, Washington 1848, S. 87–115, (online).
- [Cactaceae]. In: William Hemsley Emory: Notes of a military reconnoissance from fort Leavenworth, in Missouri, to San Diego in California. Wendell & Benthuysen, Washington 1848, S. 155–159, (online).
- In: Asa Gray: Plantae Fendlerianae Novi-Mexicanae: An Account of a Collection of Plants made chiefly in the Vicinity of Santa Fé, New Mexico, by Augustus Fendler; with Descriptions of the New Species, Critical Remarks, and Characters of other undescribed or little known Plants from surrounding Regions. Boston 1848.
  - Cactaceae. S. 49–53, (online).
  - Loranthaceae. S. 58–60, (online).
  - Drymaria nodosa. S. 12–13 (online).
  - Talinum calycinum. S. 14, (online).
  - [North American Species of Gerania]. S. 26–27, (online).
  - Calliandra Chameadrys. S. 39, [online]

1850s

- In: Asa Gray: Plantae Lindheimerianae, Part II. An Account of a Collection of Plants made by F. Lindheimer in the Western part of Texas, in the Years 1845-6, and 1847-8, with Critical remarks, Descriptions of new Species, &c.. In: Boston Journal of Natural History. Vol 6, 1850, S. 141–240, (online).
  - Vesicaria recurvata. S. 147, (online)-
  - Paronychia Lindheimeri. S. 152, (online).
  - Eysenhardtia spinosa n. sp. S, 174, (online)
  - Prunus minutiflora. S. 185, (online).
  - Passiflora tenuiloba. S. 192, (online).
  - Cactaceae. S 195–209 (online).
  - Daucosma. S. 210–211, (online). - mit Asa Gray
  - Loranthaceae. S. 212–215, (online).
- In: A. Wislizenus: Denkschrift über eine Reise nach Nord-Mexiko: Verbunden mit der Expedition des Obersten Donniphan, in den Jahren 1846 und 1847. Aus dem Englischen übertragen von George M. von Ross, (online).
- On the Character of the Vegetation of South Western Texas. In: Proceedings of the American Association for the Advancement of Science. Vol 5, 1851, S. 223–229, (online).
- Notes on the Cereus giganteus of South Eastern California and some other Californian Cactaceae. In: American Journal of Science and Arts. 2. Folge, Vol 14, 1852, S. 335–339, S. 446, (online).
- In: Asa Gray: Plantae Wrightianae texano-neo-mexicanae: An account of a collection of plants made by Charles Wright. Smithsonian Institution, Washington 1852–1853.
  - [Notes upon Linum]. S. 25, (online).
  - Rhus microphylla. S. 31, (online).
  - Desmodium Wislizeni. S. 53, (online).
  - [Characters of Fendlera]. S. 64, (online).
- Further Notes on Cereus giganteus of Southeastern California, with a short account of another allied species of Sonora. In: American Journal of Science and Arts. 2. Folge, Vol 17, 1854, S. 231–235, (online).
- Description Of The Cactaceae. In: Route near the thirty-fifth parallel explored by Lieutenant A. W. Whipple, Topographical Engineers, in 1853 and 1854. Vol 4, Part 5, Report Of The Botany Of The Expedition, B. Tucker, Washington 1856, S, 27–58, (online). - with John Milton Bigelow
- In: Asa Gray: A Manual of the Botany of the Northern United States. 2. Auflage, George P. Putnam & Co., New York 1856.
  - Cuscuta. S. 336–338, (online).
  - Euphorbia. S. 385–389, (online).
  - Alisma. S. 437–438, (online).
  - Echinodorus. S. 438, (online).
  - Sagittaria. S. 438–440, (online).
- Synopsis of the Cactaceae of the Territory of the United States and Adjacent Regions. In: Proceedings of the American Academy of Arts and Sciences. Vol 3, 1856, S. 259–314, (online).
- Synopsis of the Cactaceae of the Territory of the United States and Adjacent Regions. Metcalf, Cambridge 1856, (online).
- Account of the western part of Texas. In: Boston Journal of Natural History. Vol 6, 1857, S. 34–40, (online).
- Two new dioecious grasses of the United States. In: Transactions of the Academy of Science of St. Louis. Vol 1, 1859, S. 431–442, Tafel 12–14, (online).
- Systematic Arrangement of the Species of the Genus Cuscuta, with critical Remarks on old species and Descriptions of new ones. In: Transactions of the Academy of Science of St. Louis. Vol 1, 1859, S. 453–523, (online).
- Cactaceae of the Boundary. In: United States and Mexican Boundary Survey, under the Order of Lietu. Col. W. H. Emory, Major first Cavalry, and United States Commissioner. Vol 2, Teil 1, Cornelius Wendell, Washington 1859, (online).

1860s

- Generis Cuscutae species secundum ordinem systematicum dispositae: adjectis in prius jam notas observationibus criticis nec non novarum descriptionibus /auctore Georgio Engelmann; latine vertit Paulus Ascherson; praefatus est Alexander Braun. Gustavus Bosselmann, Berlin 1860, (online).
- Notes on the Grape-Vines of Missouri. In: Transactions of the Academy of Science of St. Louis. Vol 1, 1860, S. 660–662. (online).
- [Remarks on the hybrids of Verbena]. In: Transactions of the Academy of Science of St. Louis. Vol 1, 1860, S. 675–676. (online).
- Botany. In: Ferdinand Vandeveer Hayden: On the Geology and Natural History of the Upper Missouri. In: Transactions of the American Philosophical Society. Neue Folge, Vol 12, 1861, S. 182–212, (online).
- Cactaceae. In: Report upon the Colorado River of the West, explored in 1857 and 1858 by Lieutenant Joseph C. Ives, Corps of Topographical Engineers under the direction of the Office of explorations and surveys, A. A. Humphreys, Captain Topographical Engineers, in charge; By order of the Secretary of War. Government Printing Office, Washington 1861, Botany, S. 12–14, (online).
- Euphorbiaceae. In: Report upon the Colorado River of the West, explored in 1857 and 1858 by Lieutenant Joseph C. Ives, Corps of Topographical Engineers under the direction of the Office of explorations and surveys, A. A. Humphreys, Captain Topographical Engineers, in charge; By order of the Secretary of War. Government Printing Office, Washington 1861, Botany, S. 26–27, (online).
- Notes in the Enumeration of the Plants of the Rocky Mts., by Asa Gray. In: American Journal of Science and Arts. 2. Folge, Vol 34, 1862, S. 256–257; Supplements 1 und 2, S. 330–335.
- [Remarks on Nelumbium luteum]. In: Transactions of the Academy of Science of St. Louis. Vol 2, 1862, S. 136–129, (online).
- [Remarks on the Dimorphism of Draba brachyearpa]. In: Transactions of the Academy of Science of St. Louis. Vol 2, 1862, S. 154–155, (online).
- [Remarks on two Species of Fungi destructive to Vineyards]. In: Transactions of the Academy of Science of St. Louis. Vol 2, 1862, S. 165–166, (online).
- [Remarks on the Nature of the Pulp of Cactus Fruit]. In: Transactions of the Academy of Science of St. Louis. Vol 2, 1862, 166–167, (online).
- [Remarks on the Structure and Fruit of the Genus Ribes]. In: Transactions of the Academy of Science of St. Louis. Vol 2, 1862, S. 180–181, (online).
- Additions to the Cactus-Flora of the Territory of the United States. In: Transactions of the Academy of Science of St. Louis. Vol 2, 1862, S. 197–204, (online).
- On Pinus aristata, a New Species of Pine discovered by Dr. C. C. Parry in the Alpine Regions of Colorado Territory, and on some other Pines of the Rocky Mountains. In: Transactions of the Academy of Science of St. Louis. Vol 2, 1862, 205–214, (online).
- [Note on Polygonum tenue]. In: Proceedings of the Academy of Natural Sciences of Philadelphia. Vol 15, 1863, S. 75, (online).
- New species of Gentiana from the Alpine Regions of the Rocky Mountains. In: Transactions of the Academy of Science of St. Louis. Vol 2, 1863, S. 214–218, 5 Tafeln, (online).
- [Remarks on the Fruit and Seed of different Species of Viburnum and Cornus]. In: Transactions of the Academy of Science of St. Louis. Vol 2, 1865, S. 269–271, (online).
- Notice of some additional observations on the Physiography of the Rocky Mountains made during the Summer of 1864. Appendix. In: Transactions of the Academy of Science of St. Louis. Vol 2, 1865, S. 282–285, (online).
- In: Asa Gray: Manual of the botany of the northern United States: including the district east of the Mississippi and north of North Carolina and Tennessee, arranged according to the natural system. Ivison, Phinney, Blakeman, & Co., New York 1867.
  - Cuscuta. S. 377–380, (online).
  - Callitriche. S. 427–429, (online).
  - Euphorbia. S. 430–435, (online).
  - Juncus. S. 537–544, (online).
  - Isoetes. S. 675–677, (online).
- A Revision of the North American Species of the Genus Juncus, with a Description of new or imperfectly known Species. In: Transactions of the Academy of Science of St. Louis. Vol 2, 1868, S. 424–498, S. 590, (online).

1870s

- Ueber die Charactere der Abietineen- Genera. In: Botanische Zeitung. Vol 26, 1868, S. 484–487, (online).
- Speirodela. In: Bulletin of the Torrey Botanical Club. Vol 1, 1870, Nummer 11, S. 42–43, (online).
- Speirodela polyrhiza. In: Bulletin of the Torrey Botanical Club. Vol 2, Nummer 12, 1871, S. 46–47, (online).
- [Notes on Opuntia and Speirodela]. In: Bulletin of the Torrey Botanical Club. Vol 2, 1871, S. 34–35. (online)
- In: Sereno Watson u.a: Botany. United States Geological Exploration of the fortieth parallel. Vol 5, Government Printing Office, Washington 1871.
  - Cactaceae. S. 115–120, (online).
  - Yucca, Agave, Hesperaloe. S. 496–497, (online)
- "The Flower of Yucca and its Fertilization". In: Bulletin of the Torrey Botanical Club. Vol 3, Nummer 7, 1870, S. 33, (online).
- [Agave]. In: Bulletin of the Torrey Botanical Club. Vol 3, 1872, S. 37, (online).
- [Arceuthobium minutum]. In: Transactions of the Academy of Science of St. Louis. Vol 3, 1872, S. LXXXIII, (online).
- [Arceuthobium minutum]. In: Bulletin of the Torrey Botanical Club. Vol 2, Nummer 12, 1871, S. 43, (online).
- [Arceuthobium minutum]. In: Bulletin of the Torrey Botanical Club. Vol 2, Nummer 12, 1871, S. 47, (online).
- The true Grape-Vines of the old United States. In: American Naturalist. Vol 6, Nummer 9, 1872, S. 539–542, JSTOR:2447619.
- Notes on the Genus Yucca. In: Transactions of the Academy of Science of St. Louis. Vol 3. 17–64, 1873, (online).
- Notes on the Genus Yucca. No. 2. In: Transactions of the Academy of Science of St. Louis. Vol 3, 1873, S. 210–214, (online).
- Addition to the Article on YUCCA, p. 17 of this Vol. In: Transactions of the Academy of Science of St. Louis. Vol 3, 1873, S. 371–372, (online).
- Juncus maritimus, Lam. In: Bulletin of the Torrey Botanical Club. Vol 4, Nummer 8, 1873, S. 40, (online).
- Vitis. ?? In: Bulletin of the Torrey Botanical Club. Vol 5, S. 233–234?, S. 310–311?. 1874.
- The true Grape-Vines of the United States. In: Charles Valentine Riley (Hrsg.): Sixth Annual report on the noxious, beneficial and other insects, of the state of Missouri. 1874, S. 70–76, (online).
- [Account of the three western species of Isoetes]. In: C. C. Parry: Botanical Observations in Western Wyoming. In: American Naturalist. Vol 8, Nummer 4, 1874, S. 214–215, JSTOR:
- Lecture on the Forests of the Rocky Mountains. Reported in St. Louis Democrat, March 6, 1875. (Meehan's Gardener's Monthly, 17. 151–153, 181–184, 214–217.)
- The true Grape-Vines of the United States. In: Bush & Son & Meissner: Illustrated Descriptive Catalogue of American Grape-Vines, with brief Directions for their Culture. 2. Auflage, R. P. Studley Co., Saint Louis 1875, S. 4–11, (online).
- Abies subalpina Eng. n. sp. In: American Naturalist. Vol 10, Nummer 9, 1876, S. 555, JSTOR:2448331.
- Notes on Coniferae. In: Thomas Meehan (Hrsg.): The Gardener's monthly and horticulturist, Vol 19, 1877, S. 308.
- Appendix M. [Botany]. In: James Hervey Simpson: Report of explorations across the Great Basin of the territory of Utah for a direct wagon-route from Camp Floyd to Genoa, in Carson Valley, in 1859. Government Printing Office, Washington 1876, S. 435–447, (online).
- Oak and Grape Fungi. In: Transactions of the Academy of Science of St. Louis. Vol 3, 5. Juni 1876, S. CCXV–CCXVI, (online)
- Morphology of the carpellary Scale of Coniferae. In: American Journal of Science. 3. Folge, Vol 12, 1876, S. 469.
- About the Oaks of the United States. In: Transactions of the Academy of Science of St. Louis. Vol 3, 1876/1877, S. 372–400, S. 539–543, (online).
- [Geographical range and migration of plants and animals]. In: Transactions of the Academy of Science of St. Louis. Vol 3, 1876, S. CCIX–CCXXXII, (online).
- A new Cuscuta. In: Botanical Gazette. Vol 2, 1877, S. 69, (online).
- Cuscuta racemosa. In: Botanical Gazette. Vol 2, 1877, S. 80, (online).
- Pinius serotintae. In: Botanical Gazette. Vol 2, 1877, S. 125, (online).
- On Abies Menziesii and A. Engelmanni. ??? In: Gardeners’ Chronicle. Neue Folge, Vol 7, 22. Dezember 1877, S. 790, (online).
- Geograpnical Distribution of North American Flora. In: Transactions of the Academy of Science of St. Louis. Vol 3, 19. November 1877, S. CCLXX–CCLXXI, (online).
- The American Juniper of the Section Sabina. In: Transactions of the Academy of Science of St. Louis. Vol 3, 1877, S. 583–592, (online).
- Isoetes melanospora. In: Transactions of the Academy of Science of St. Louis. Vol 3, 1877, S. 395, (online).
- Notes on Agave. In: Transactions of the Academy of Science of St. Louis. Vol 3, 1878, S. 291–322, (online).
- Addition to Dr. Engelmann's Article on Agave p. 291-322. In: Transactions of the Academy of Science of St. Louis. Vol 3, 1878, S. 370–371, (online).
- The Flowering of Agave Shawii. In: Transactions of the Academy of Science of St. Louis. Vol 3, 1878, S. 579–582, (online).
- The species of Isoetes of the Indian Territory. In: Botanical Gazette, Vol 3, Nummer 1, 1878, S. 1, (online).
- Baptisia sulphurea, n. sp. In: Botanical Gazette, Vol 3, Nummer 8, 1878, S. 65, (online).
- A Synopsis of the American Firs (Abies Link). In: Transactions of the Academy of Science of St. Louis. Vol 3, 1878, S. 593–602, (online).
- In: Joseph T. Rothrock: Report Upon United States Geographical Surveys West of the One Hundredth Meridian, in Charge of First Lieut. Geo. M. Wheeler... Vol 6: Botany. Government Printing Office, Washington 1878.
  - Cactaceae. S. 127–132, (online).
  - Gentianaceae. S. 189–197, (online).
  - Cuscutineae. S. 206–207, (online).
  - Euphorbiaceae. S. 242–248, (online).
  - Cupuliferae. S. 249–251, (online).
  - Loranthaceae. S. 251–254, (online).
- Pine. In: Johnson's New Universal Cyclopaedia. Vol 3. 1878, S. 1256–1275.
- Cuscuta. In: Asa Gray: Synoptical Flora of North America. Vol 2, Teil 1, 1878, S. 219–224, (online).
- The Gymnospermy of Coniferae. (Review of a paper by Dr. L, Celakovsky in Flora for June, 1879.) In: American Journal of Science and Arts. 3. Folge, Vol 18, 1879, S. 311–313.

1880s

- Wild Grapes. In: Transactions of the Academy of Science of St. Louis. Vol 4, 1880, S. XLIV, (online).
- Revision of the Genus Pinus, and description of Pinus Elliottii. in: Transactions of the Academy of Science of St. Louis. Vol 4, 1880, S. 161–190, 3 Tafeln, (online).
- The Acorns and their germination. In: Transactions of the Academy of Science of St. Louis. Vol 4, 1880, S. 190–192, (online).
- [Catalpa speciosa, Warder.] In: Botanical Gazette, Vol 5, Nummer 1, 1880, S. 1, (online).
- Vitality of the Seeds of Serotinous Cones. In: Botanical Gazette, Vol 5, Nummer 6, 1880, S. 62, (online).
- Fraxinus quadrangulata. In: Botanical Gazette, Vol 5, Nummer 6, 1880, S. 63, (online).
- In: Sereno Watson: Geological Survey of California. Botany. Vol 2, Cambridge 1880
  - Cupuliferae. S. 93-100, (online).
  - Loranthaceae. S. 104-107, (online).
  - Abietineae. ?
- Abies amabilis In: Gardeners’ Chronicle. Neue Folge, Vol 14, 4. Dezember 1880, S. 720, (online).
- [Some Account of the Vegetation along the Great Lakes]. In: Transactions of the Academy of Science of St. Louis. Vol 4, 1880, S. XX, (online).
- Some Additions to the North American Flora. In: Botanical Gazette. Vol 6, 1881, S. 223–225, S. 238, (online).
- Notes on Western Conifers. In: Botanical Gazette. Vol 7, 1882, S. 4–5, (online).
- Some Additions to the North American Flora. In: Botanical Gazette. Vol 7, 1882, S. 5–6, (online).
- [Texas Oaks]. In: Botanical Gazette. Vol 7, 1882, S. 14, (online).
- Some Notes on Yucca. In: Botanical Gazette. Vol 7, Nummer 2, 1882, S. 17, (online).
- The female Flowers of Coniferae. In: Botanical Gazette. Vol 7, 1882, S. 104–105, (online).
- The black-fruited Crataegi and a new species. In: Botanical Gazette. Vol 7, 1882, S. 127–129, (online).
- Additions to the Flora of the United States. In: Bulletin of the Torrey Botanical Club. Vol 9, 1882, S. 4–5, (online).
- Rosa minutifolia, n. sp. In: Bulletin of the Torrey Botanical Club. Vol 9, Nummer 8, 1882, S. 97–98, 127, (online).
- Picea Engelmanni and Picea ptuingens. In: Gardeners’ Chronicle. Neue Folge, Vol 17. 4. Februar 1882, S. 145, (online).
- Pinus latisquama, n. sp. In: Gardeners’ Chronicle. Neue Folge, Vol 18, 2. Dezember 1882, S. 712, (online).´
- The Female flowers of Coniferae. In: The American Journal of Science. 3. Folge, Vol 23, 1882, S. 418–422 und Vol 24, 1882, S. 233–235.
- The genus Isoetes in North America. In: Transactions of the Academy of Science of St. Louis. Vol 4, 1882, S. 358–390, (online).
- The genus Isoetes in North America. St. Louis 1882 (online).
- [Note on Catalpa speciosa]. In: Transactions of the Academy of Science of St. Louis. Vol 4, 1882, S. L, (online).
- Euphorbia deltoidea. In: Alvin Wentworth Chapman: Flora of the Southern United States. 2. Auflage, Ivison, Blakeman & Co., New York 1883, S. 647, (online).
- Plantago pusilla, Nutt. In: Botanical Gazette. Vol 8, 1883, 175–176, (online).
- Vitis palmata, Vahl. In: Botanical Gazette. Vol 8, 1883, S. 254–255, (online).
- [Review] Sections of Wood Arranged for Instruction in School [H. Brooks]. In: Botanical Gazette. Vol 8, 1883, S. 337–338, (online).
- [Review] Morphology of Spines [I. Urban]. In: Botanical Gazette. Vol 8, 1883, S. 338, (online).
- The true Grape Vines of the United States. In: Bush & Son & Meissner: Illustrated Descriptive Catalogue of American Grape Vines. A Grape Growers' Manual. 3. Auflage, St. Louis, R. P. Studley & Co., 1883, S. 9–20, (online).
- The Diseases of Grape Vines. In: Bush & Son & Meissner: Illustrated Descriptive Catalogue of American Grape Vines. A Grape Growers' Manual. 3. Auflage, St. Louis, R. P. Studley & Co., 1883, S. 47–48, (online).
- A New Aristida In: Botanical Gazette. Vol 9, 1884, S. 76–77, (online).

Posthum

- William Trelease, Asa Gray (Hrsg.): The botanical works of the late George Engelmann, collected for Henry Shaw, esq. J. Wilson and Son, Cambridge (MA) 1887, (online).

== Meteorology and Geography ==
Transactions of the Academy of Science of St. Louis

- Meteorological Table for 1856, Made from Observations in St. Louis. Vol 1, Nummer 1, 1856, S. 87, (online). - mit Friedrich Adolph Wislizenus
- Meteorological Observation [1856, 1857]. Vol 1, Nummer 2, 1857, S. 301–303, (online). - mit Friedrich Adolph Wislizenus
- Meteorological Table for 1858, Made from Observations in St. Louis. Vol 1, Nummer 3, 1859, S. 524–525, (online). - mit Friedrich Adolph Wislizenus
- Elevation of St. Louis above the Gulf of Mexico. Vol 1, Nummer 4, 1860, S. 663–668, (online).
- Meteorological Table for 1860 - St. Louis, MO. Vol 2, Nummer 1, 1861, S. 68, (online).
- Meteorological Table for 1861 - St. Louis, MO. Vol 2, Nummer 1, 1861, S. 69, (online).
- Difference of Temperature and of Relative Humidity in City and Country. Vol 2, Nummer 1, 1861, S. 70–74, (online).
- Fall of Rain in St. Louis During Twenty Three Years - 1839 to 1861. Vol 2, Nummer 1, 1861, S. 75, (online).
- Fall of Snow (melted) in St. Louis in 23 Years, from 1839 to 1861. Vol 2, Nummer 1, 1861, S. 76, (online).
- Fall of Rain (including melted Snow) in St. Louis, from 1839 to 1861. Vol 2, Nummer 1, 1861, S. 77–79, (online).
- Stage of the Mississippi River at St. Louis in 1816. Vol 2, Nummer 1, 1861, S. 79–80, Tafel 4, (online).
- Meteorological Table for 1862 - St. Louis, MO. Vol 2, Nummer 1, S. 119, (online)
- Altitude of Pike's Peak and other points in Colorado Territory. Vol 2, Nummer 1, S. 126–133, (online).
- [Observations on Thunderstorms. March 31st, 1861]. Vol 2, Nummer 1, 1861, S. 153, (online).
- [Observations on a Thunderstorm. May 5th, 1861]. Vol 2, Nummer 1, 1861, S. 157, (online).
- [On a Remarkable Snowstorm. October 25th, 1862]. Vol 2, Nummer 1, 1862, S. 187, (online).
- [Winter Temperature at St. Louis]. Vol 2, Nummer 2, 1863, S. 222, (online).
- [Climate at the Base of the Rocky Mountains]. Vol 2, Nummer 2, 1863, S. 226–227, (online).
- [Late Springs at St. Louis]. Vol 2, Nummer 2, 1864, S. 246, (online).
- [Arid Heat of September, 1864]. Vol 2, Nummer 2, 1864, S. 249, (online).
- [Winter Temperature at St. Louis]. Vol 2, Nummer 2, 1865, S. 264, (online).
- [Heavy Rains at St. Louis]. Vol 2, Nummer 2, 1865, S. 266–267, (online).
- Meteorological Table for 1863 - St. Louis, MO. Vol 2, Nummer 3, S. 297, (online).
- Meteorological Table for 1864 - St. Louis, MO. Vol 2, Nummer 3, S. 298, Tafel 12, (online).
- Meteorological Table for 1865 - St. Louis, MO. Vol 2, Nummer 3, S. 419. (online).
- The Variations in the Stage of the Mississippi River at St. Louis. Vol 2, Nummer 3, S. 420–423, online
- Meteorological Table for 1866 - St. Louis, MO. Vol 2, Nummer 3, S. 505, (online).
- Meteorological Table for 1867 - St. Louis, MO. Vol 2, Nummer 3, S. 506, (online).
- [Earlyness of Seasons]. Vol 3, 17. April 1871, S. XLVI (online).
- [Meteorological Reports. Summer of 1871]. Vol 3, 2. Oktober 1871, S. XLIX–LI, (online).
- [Freezing of Mississippi at St. Louis]. Vol 3, 18. Dezember 1871, S. LIV (online).
- [Meteorological Observations]. Vol 3, 6. January 1873, S. XC–XCI
- One of the two coldest Winters in St. Louis, in the last 40 Years. Vol 3, 3. März 1873, S. CIII, (online).
- [May unusually wet]. Vol 3, 2. Juni 1873, S. CVI–CVII, (online).
- [Meteorological Reports. Winter of 1873–4]. Vol 3, 2. März 1874, S. CXXXII–CXXXIII, (online).
- [High Water in Mississippi]. Vol 3, 15. Juni 1874, S. CXLIV, (online)
- [Meteorological Report]. Vol 3, 7. Dezember 1874, S. CLII–CLIII, (online).
- [Meteorological Report]. Vol 3, 18. January 1875, S. CLXIV–CLXV, (online).
- [Meteorological Report]. Vol 3, 1. February 1875, S. CLXVI–CLXVI, (online).
- [Meteorological Reports. Winter of 1874–5]. Vol 3, 16. März 1875, S. CVXXIII–CLXXV, (online).
- The Meteorology of 1875. Vol 3, 3. January 1876, S. CXCVI, (online)
- [Meteorological Reports. Winter of 1875–6]. Vol 3, 6. März 1876, S. CCIII, (online).
- [Meteorology of March, 1876]. Vol 3, 3. April 1876 S. CCVIII–CCIX, (online).
- The Meteorology of March, 1877. Vol 3, 2. April 1877, S. CCLIX, online.
- [Meteorological Reports. Spring of 1877]. Vol 3, 4. Juni 1877, S. CCLXIII, (online).
- The Temperature of the Summer [1877]. Vol 3, 1. Oktober 1877, S. CCLXV, (online).
- The Temperature of December, 1877. Vol 4, 28. January 1878, S. VII, (online).
- Meteorology of the Year 1877. Vol 4, 28. January 1878, S. VIII, (online)
- The Temperature of the Winter of 1877–8. Vol 4, 4. März 1878, S. XII, (online).
- [Comparing the present Spring with that of 1842]. Vol 4, 1. April 1878, S. XIV–XV, (online).
- [Few Remarks on the Tepemrature of May]. Vol 4, 3. Juni 1878, (online).
- [Past May]. Vol 4, 16. Juni 1879, S. XXXIX–XL, (online).
- [Remarks on the recent hot Weather]. Vol 4, 20. Oktober 1879, S. XLII–XLII, (online).
- [Remarks on the Temperature of the Month]. Vol 4, 19. January 1880, S. XLIX–XLX, (online).
- [Statement of the temperature for the past month]. Vol 4, 2. Februar 1880, S. XLX-XLXI, (online).
- [Note on the Temperature of February and the past Month]. Vol 4, 1. März 1880, S. LIV (online).
- [Remarks Concerning the month of May]. Vol 4, 7. Juni 1880, S. LVI, (online).
- [Temperature of March]. Vol 4, 4. April 1881, S. LXIV, (online).
- [Temperature of the present Spring]. Vol 4, 1. Mai 1882, S. LXXIV–LXXV, (online).
- [Past Month was among the coldest]. Vol 4, 5. Juni 1882, S. LXXV–LXXVI, (online).
- [Note on the Climatology of St. Louis]. Vol 4, 6. November 1882, S. LXXVII–LXXVIII, (online).
- [Cool weather at the present time]. Vol 4, 21. Mai 1883, S. LXXXVI, (online).
- [Diagram of the mean temperature in St. Louis from 1836 to 1883]. Vol 4, 17. Dezember 1883, S. LXXXVIII, (online).
- The mean and extreme daily Temperatures in St. Louis during forty seven years, as calculated from daily observations. Vol 4, 1883, S. 496–508, (online).

Other

- Comparison of Barometers. In: John Charles Frémont: Report of the exploring expedition to the Rocky mountains in the year 1842, and to Oregon and north California in the years 1843-44. Blair and Rives, Printers, Washington 1845, S. 561, (online).
- Climatology. In: R. A. Campbell: Campbell's New Atlas of Missouri with descriptions Historical, Scientific, and Statistical. S. Augustus Mitchell, Philadelphia 1873, S. 103, (online).

== Speeches as President of the Academy of Science of St. Louis ==
- [Annual Report of the Progress of the Academy]. In: Transactions of the Academy of Science of St. Louis. Vol 2, 6. January 1862, S. 171–172, (online).
- Address of the President. In: Transactions of the Academy of Science of St. Louis. Vol 2, 5. January 1863, S. 194–196, (online).
- Annual Report. In: Transactions of the Academy of Science of St. Louis. Vol 2, 4. January 1864, S. 239–240, (online).
- Annual Report. In: Transactions of the Academy of Science of St. Louis. Vol 2, 2. January 1865, S. 257–259, (online).
- Annual Address. In: Transactions of the Academy of Science of St. Louis. Vol 2, 8. January 1866, S. 550–551, (online).
- Annual Address. In: Transactions of the Academy of Science of St. Louis. Vol 2, 7. January 1867, S. 569–570, (online).
- Annual Address. In: Transactions of the Academy of Science of St. Louis. Vol 2, 1. January 1868, S. 581–582, (online).
- Annual Address of the President. In: Transactions of the Academy of Science of St. Louis. Vol 3, 16. January 1871, S. XXXVII–XL, (online).
- Annual Address. In: Transactions of the Academy of Science of St. Louis. Vol 4, 6. January 1879, S. XXXII–XXXIII, (online).
- [Annual Address]. In: Transactions of the Academy of Science of St. Louis. Vol 4, 15. Dezember 1879, S. XLVI–XLVII, (online).
- [Annual Address]. In: Transactions of the Academy of Science of St. Louis. Vol 4, 3. January 1881, S. LX–LXI, (online).
- [Annual Address]. In: Transactions of the Academy of Science of St. Louis. Vol 4, 3. January 1882, S. LXIX–LXX, (online).
- The President’s Address. In: Transactions of the Academy of Science of St. Louis. Vol 4, 2. January 1883, S. LXXXII–LXXXIII, (online).

== Newspapers ==
- Das Westland. Nordamerikanische Zeitschrift für Deutschland, Heidelberg 1837. - als Herausgeber und Author
  - Die heissen Quellen in Arkansas. S. 12–28.
  - Briefe geschrieben auf einer Reise in den südwestlichsten Theilen der Vereinigten Staaten im Jahr 1835. S. 145–166.
  - Die deutsche Niederlassung in Illinois; fünf Meilen östlich von Belleville (mit einer Charte). S. 284–311.

== Secondary Literature ==
- Heinrich Armin Rattermann: Dr. med. Georg Engelmann. Verzeichniß von Dr. Georg Engelmann's Schriften. In: Der Deutsche Pionier. Vol 16, 1884–1885, S. 366–370, (online).
- Charles Sprague Sargent: Botanical Papers of George Engelmann. In: Botanical Gazette. Vol 9, Number 5, 1884, P. 69–74, JSTOR:2995110.
- Patricia P. Timberlake: George Engelmann: Scientist at the Gateway to the American West, 1809-1860. M.A. Thesis. University of Missouri, Columbia, Missouri, 1984, P. 130–145.
- Charles A. White: Memoir of George Engelmann: 1809-1884. (WikiSource)
