= Eupithecia riparia =

Scientific classification
- Kingdom: Animalia
- Phylum: Arthropoda
- Class: Insecta
- Order: Lepidoptera
- Family: Geometridae
- Genus: Eupithecia
- Species: E. riparia

Binomial name
- Eupithecia riparia Herrich-Schäffer, 1851

Synonyms
- Eupithecia drupisaria Petersen, 1909

Species of moth

Eupithecia riparia is a moth in the family Geometridae. It is found in Italy, Slovenia, Croatia, Albania and Greece.

The wingspan is 16–17 mm.

The larvae feed on Drypis spinosa.
