= Leiophora innoxia =

Scientific classification
- Kingdom: Animalia
- Phylum: Arthropoda
- Class: Insecta
- Order: Diptera
- Family: Tachinidae
- Subfamily: Exoristinae
- Tribe: Blondeliini
- Genus: Leiophora
- Species: L. innoxia

Binomial name
- Leiophora innoxia (Meigen, 1824)

Synonyms
- Tachina innoxia (Meigen, 1824)

Species of fly

Leiophora innoxia is a European species of fly in the family Tachinidae.

== Distribution ==
China, British Isles, Czech Republic, Hungary, Moldova, Poland, Slovakia, Ukraine, Norway, Sweden, Bosnia & Herzegovina, Italy, Serbia, Slovenia, Austria, Belgium, France, Germany, Switzerland, Mongolia, Russia, Transcaucasia.
