= Enarthrocarpus pterocarpus =

Scientific classification
- Kingdom: Plantae
- Clade: Tracheophytes
- Clade: Angiosperms
- Clade: Eudicots
- Clade: Rosids
- Order: Brassicales
- Family: Brassicaceae
- Genus: Enarthrocarpus
- Species: E. pterocarpus

Binomial name
- Enarthrocarpus pterocarpus (Pers.) DC.

Species of plant

Enarthrocarpus pterocarpus is a species of plants in the family Brassicaceae.

== Sources ==
This article incorporates text from a free content work. Licensed under CC0 (license statement/permission). Text taken from Enarthrocarpus pterocarpus. Encyclopedia of Life.
