= Farsetia socotrana =

Conservation status
- Vulnerable (IUCN 3.1)

Scientific classification
- Kingdom: Plantae
- Clade: Tracheophytes
- Clade: Angiosperms
- Clade: Eudicots
- Clade: Rosids
- Order: Brassicales
- Family: Brassicaceae
- Genus: Farsetia
- Species: F. socotrana

Binomial name
- Farsetia socotrana B.L.Burtt

Species of flowering plant

Farsetia socotrana is a species of flowering plant in the family Brassicaceae. It is found only on Socotra in Yemen. Its natural habitat is subtropical or tropical dry shrubland. It is threatened by habitat loss.
