= Spiranthera (disambiguation) =

Spiranthera may refer to:

- Spiranthera, a genus of plants in the family Rutaceae
- Spiranthera, a genus of plants in the family Liliaceae, synonym of Eustrephus
- Spiranthera, a genus of plants in the family Convolvulaceae, synonym of Merremia
- Spiranthera, a genus of plants in the family Pittosporaceae, synonym of Billardiera
