= Joseph Lieutaud =

French physician

- Born: 21 June 1703; Aix-en-Provence, Bouches-du-Rhône, France
- Died: 6 December 1780 (aged 77); Versailles, Île-de-France, France
- Education: University of Aix-en-Provence
- Occupation: Physician
- Parent(s): Jean-Baptiste Lieutaud; Louise (de) Garibel
- Relatives: Pierre Joseph Garidel (maternal uncle)

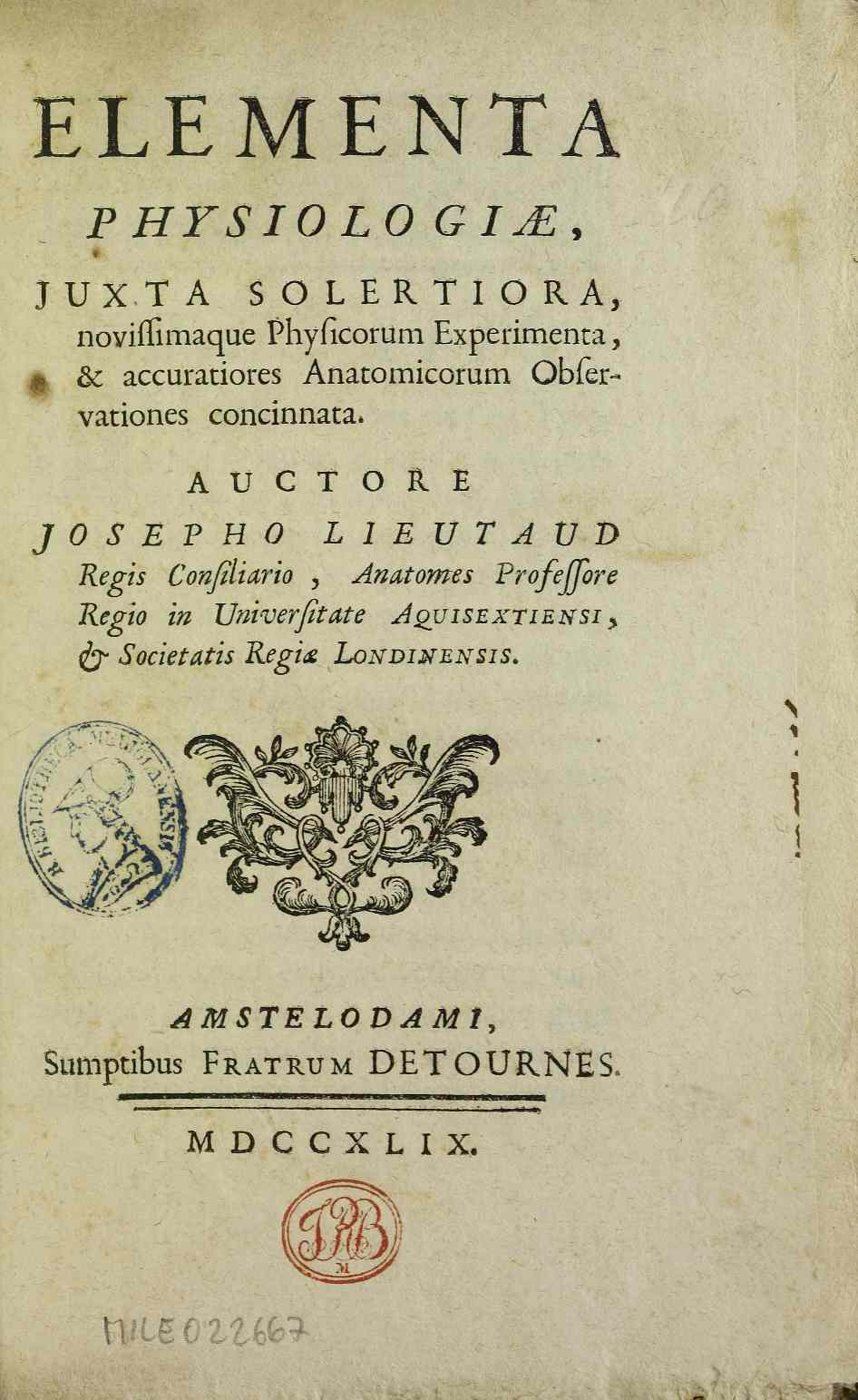
Elementa physiologiae, 1749

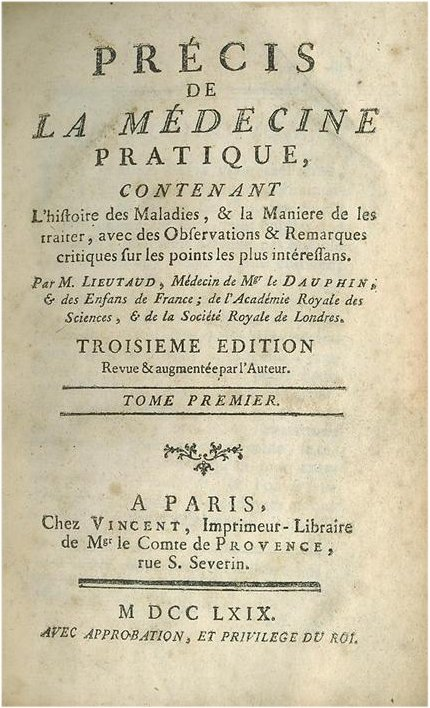
First page of Précis de la médecine pratique.

Joseph Lieutaud (French pronunciation: [ʒozɛf ljøto]; 21 June 1703 – 6 December 1780) was a French physician.

== Biography ==
=== Early life ===
Joseph Lieutaud was born on 21 June 1703 at 31 Rue Cardinale in Aix-en-Provence. His father was Jean-Baptiste Lieutaud, a lawyer, and his mother, Louise (de) Garibel. He started studying botany, following in the wake of his uncle, Pierre Joseph Garidel, and went on to be called upon as a doctor in the Hotel-Dieu in Aix-en-Provence. He graduated from the University of Aix-en-Provence in 1725.

He was elected a Fellow of the Royal Society in 1739.

=== Career ===
By 1750, he became a doctor in the royal infirmary, then a pediatrician to King Louis XV's court, and eventually the personal physician of King Louis XVI.

He published an essay on human anatomy. His Précis de médecine pratique, published in four instalments (between 1760 and 1776), shows how forward-thinking medical sciences were at that time.

=== Death ===
He died on 6 December 1780 in Versailles.

== Legacy ==
- A street in the centre of Aix-en-Provence, Rue Lieutaud, is named in his honour.
- An avenue in the centre of Marseille, Cours Lieutaud, is also named in his honour.
