= Cupuliferae =

Outdated botanical classification

Cupuliferae is a botanical name: in this case it is a descriptive botanical name: under the ICBN it may only be applied to a taxon at a rank above that of family.

However, this name was only used for a family, and for this it may no longer be used. In the de Candolle system it referred to what is now the family Fagaceae, while in the Bentham & Hooker system it referred to a somewhat larger family, that in addition included what is now the family Betulaceae. Note that in both these works a family is indicated as "ordo".
