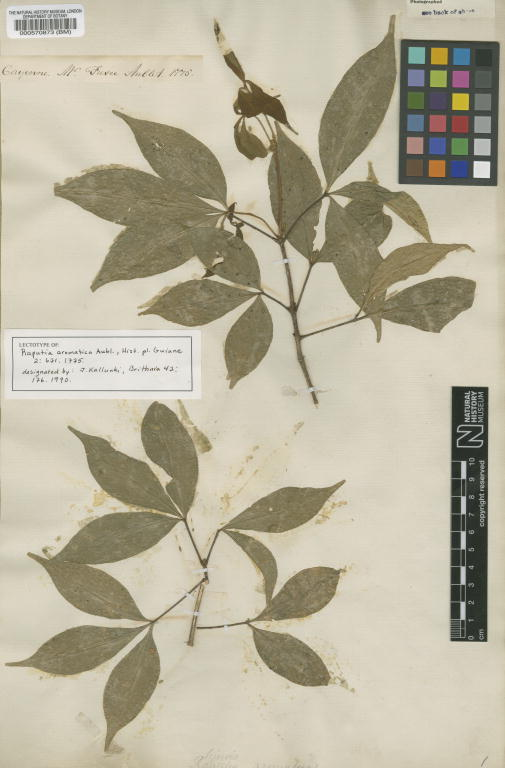

Scientific classification
- Kingdom: Plantae
- Clade: Tracheophytes
- Clade: Angiosperms
- Clade: Eudicots
- Clade: Rosids
- Order: Sapindales
- Family: Rutaceae
- Genus: Raputia
- Species: R. aromatica

Binomial name
- Raputia aromatica Aubl.

Synonyms
- Galipea aromatica (Aubl.) Spreng.; Sciuris aromatica (Aubl.) Vahl

= Raputia aromatica =

Species of tree

Raputia aromatica is a species of tree and is a member of the Rutaceae family.

The species can be found in countries such as Brazil and Venezuela.
