= Farsetia inconspicua =

Conservation status
- Vulnerable (IUCN 3.1)

Scientific classification
- Kingdom: Plantae
- Clade: Tracheophytes
- Clade: Angiosperms
- Clade: Eudicots
- Clade: Rosids
- Order: Brassicales
- Family: Brassicaceae
- Genus: Farsetia
- Species: F. inconspicua

Binomial name
- Farsetia inconspicua A.G.Mill.

Species of flowering plant

Farsetia inconspicua is a species of flowering plant in the family Brassicaceae. It is found only on western Socotra in Yemen. Its natural habitats are subtropical or tropical dry shrubland and rocky areas.
