= Pigea fasciculata =

Conservation status
- Endangered (IUCN 3.1)https://www.iucnredlist.org/species/160573214/160573302

Scientific classification
- Kingdom: Plantae
- Clade: Tracheophytes
- Clade: Angiosperms
- Clade: Eudicots
- Clade: Rosids
- Order: Malpighiales
- Family: Violaceae
- Genus: Pigea
- Species: P. fasciculata

Binomial name
- Pigea fasciculata (Grey-Wilson) P.I.Forst.

Species of plant

Pigea fasciculata is a species of plant in the family Violaceae. It is native to Kenya, and grows in the dry tropical biome.
