= Atarapa =

In Polynesian mythology, Atarapa ("daybreak") is the goddess of the dawn and a daughter of Haronga.
