= Haronga =

Polynesian mythological god

In Polynesian mythology, Haronga ("daybreak") is a god of the dawn and father of Atarapa. He is a son of Rangi and Papa.
