= Leiophora =

Scientific classification
- Kingdom: Animalia
- Phylum: Arthropoda
- Class: Insecta
- Order: Diptera
- Family: Tachinidae
- Subfamily: Exoristinae
- Tribe: Blondeliini
- Genus: Leiophora; Robineau-Desvoidy, 1863

Type species
- Leiophora nitida Robineau-Desvoidy, 1863

Synonyms
- Microptera Robineau-Desvoidy, 1830; Prohypostena Townsend, 1916; Apatelia Stein, 1924; Apatelina Enderlein, 1936

Genus of flies

Leiophora is a genus of flies in the family Tachinidae.

== Species ==
- Leiophora innoxia (Meigen, 1824)

== Distribution ==
China, British Isles, Czech Republic, Hungary, Moldova, Poland, Slovakia, Ukraine, Norway, Sweden, Bosnia & Herzegovina, Italy, Serbia, Slovenia, Austria, Belgium, France, Germany, Switzerland, Mongolia, Russia, Transcaucasia.
