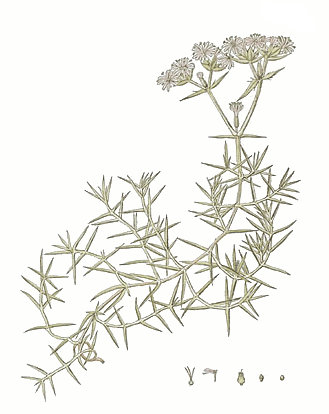
- Drypis spinosa

Scientific classification
- Kingdom: Plantae
- Clade: Tracheophytes
- Clade: Angiosperms
- Clade: Eudicots
- Order: Caryophyllales
- Family: Caryophyllaceae
- Genus: Drypis; P.Micheli ex L.

Species
- See text

= Drypis =

Genus of flowering plants

Drypis is a flowering plant genus in the family Caryophyllaceae.

== Species ==
- Drypis jacquiniana Murb.et Wettst.
- Drypis spinosa L.
