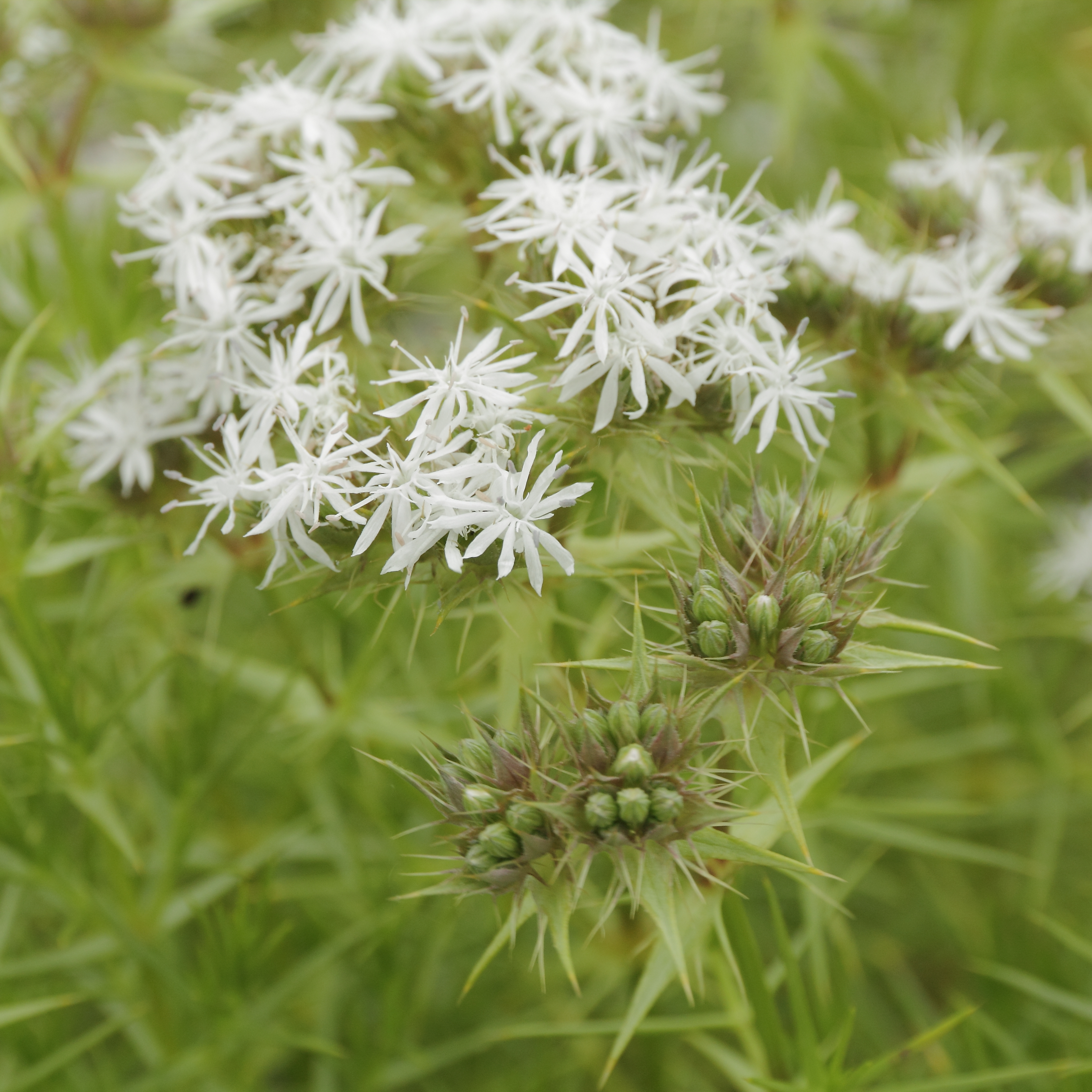

Scientific classification
- Kingdom: Plantae
- Clade: Tracheophytes
- Clade: Angiosperms
- Clade: Eudicots
- Order: Caryophyllales
- Family: Caryophyllaceae
- Genus: Drypis
- Species: D. spinosa

Binomial name
- Drypis spinosa L.

= Drypis spinosa =

Species of flowering plant

Drypis spinosa is a flowering plant species in the family Caryophyllaceae
