= De Candolle system =

Plant taxonomic system

The De Candolle system is a system of plant taxonomy by French (Swiss) botanist Augustin Pyramus de Candolle (1778−1841).

== History ==
The first taxonomic system by de Candolle, who introduced the term taxonomy, appeared in his description of the plants of France, his Flore française (1805–1815), in 5 volumes dealing with plant species found in France.

The De Candolle system is a subsequent taxonomic system.

- It was originally published by de Candolle in the Théorie élémentaire de la botanique, ou exposition des principes de la classification naturelle et de l’art de décrire et d’etudier les végétaux (1813).
- It was further developed and published in editions of the very extensive but unfinished Prodromus Systematis Naturalis Regni Vegetabilis (Prodromus) (1824–1873), dealing only with dicotyledons.

The abbreviation Syst. in de Candolle's work and subsequent literature refers to his Regni vegetabilis systema naturale.

== Systems ==
The De Candolle system recognises the following groups of vascular plants (references to Prodromus). Within the Prodromus he cross references his earlier Regni vegetabilis systema naturale.

A general schema is laid out in the Regnii vegetabilis pp. 117–122, as follows:

Plantae Vasculares seu Cotyledoneae DC.

- classis I. DICOTYLEDONEÆ seu Exogenae [Part 1 p. 1]
  subclassis 1. THALAMIFLORÆ [Part I]
  subclassis 2. CALYCIFLORÆ [Parts II - VII]
  subclassis 3. COROLLIFLORÆ [Parts VIII - XIII(1)]
  subclassis 4. MONOCHLAMYDEÆ [Parts XIII(2) - XVI]
- classis II. MONOCOTYLEDONEÆ

=== Flore française ===
- Vol I
  - Table of genera p. 57
  - Introduction (also published separately): Principes élémentaires de botanique p. 61ff.
- Vol II
  - Class I: Acotylédones p. 1

11 families

    - Family 11: Nayades
- Vol III
  - Class II: Monocotylédonés Phanérogames p. 1
    - Family 12: Gramineae p. 1
    - Family 13: Cyperaceae p. 99
    - Family 14: Typhaceae p. 147
    - Family 15: Aroideae p. 150
    - Family 16: Junceae p. 155
    - Family 17: Asparageae p. 172
    - Family 18: Alismaceae p. 181
    - Family 19: Colchicaceae p. 192
    - Family 20: Liliaceae p. 198
      - Ordre I: Liliacées p. 199
      - Ordre II: Asphodèles p. 204
      - Ordre III: Narcisses p. 229
    - Family 21: Irideae p. 235
    - Family 22: Orchideae p. 243
    - Family 23: Hydrocharideae p. 265
  - Class III: Dicotylédonés p. 269

Vol IV - 2 parts Vol V

=== Théorie élémentaire de la botanique ===
List of De Candolle system families recognized in the Théorie élémentaire de la botanique (1813), on page 213:

- I. VÉGÉTAUX VASCULAIRES OU COTYLÉDONÉS p. 213 (113 families)
  - 1. Exogènes ou dicotylédones p. 213
  - 2. Endogènes ou monocotylédonés p. 219
    - A. Phanérogames p. 219 (21 families)
      - 114. Cycadées p. 219
      - 124. Amaryllidées
      - 128. Liliacées
        - 1. Asparagées
        - 2. Trilliacées
        - 3. Asphodelées
        - 4. Bromeliées
        - 5. Tulipacées
      - 135. Graminées
    - B. Cryptogames p. 220 (4 families)
- II. VÉGÉTAUX CELLULAIRES OU ACOTYLÉDONÉS p. 220 (6 families)

=== Prodromus ===
The De Candolle system families were further developed in the Prodromus (1824–1873).

Note that this system was published well before there were internationally accepted rules for botanical nomenclature. Here, a family is indicated as "ordo". Terminations for families were not what they are now. Neither of these phenomena is a problem from a nomenclatural perspective, the present day ICBN provides for this.

Within the dicotyledons ("classis prima DICOTYLEDONEÆ") the De Candolle system recognises (Pagination from Prodromus, 17 Parts) the list:

==== Subclassis I. THALAMIFLORÆ [Part I] ====
- ordo I. RANUNCULACEÆ (Page 1)
  ordo II. DILLENIACEÆ (Page 67)
  ordo III. MAGNOLIACEÆ (Page 77)
  ordo IV. ANONACEÆ [sic] (Page 83)
  ordo V. MENISPERMACEÆ (Page 95)
  ordo VI. BERBERIDEÆ (Page 105)
  ordo VII. PODOPHYLLACEÆ (Page 111)
  ordo VIII. NYMPHÆACEÆ
  ordo VIIIbis. SARRACENIACEÆ
  ordo IX. PAPAVERACEÆ
  ordo X. FUMARIACEÆ
  ordo XIbis. RESEDACEÆ
  ordo XI. CRUCIFERÆ
  ordo XII. CAPPARIDEÆ
  ordo XIII. FLACOURTIANEÆ
  ordo XIV. BIXINEÆ
  ordo XIVbis. LACISTEMACEÆ
  ordo XV. CISTINEÆ
  ordo XVI. VIOLARIEÆ (Page 287)
  ordo XVII. DROSERACEÆ
  ordo XVIII. POLYGALACEÆ
  ordo XIX. TREMANDREÆ
  ordo XX. PITTOSPOREÆ
  ordo XXI. FRANKENIACEÆ
  ordo XXII. CARYOPHYLLEÆ
  ordo XXIII. LINEÆ
  ordo XXIV. MALVACEÆ
  ordo XXV. BOMBACEÆ [sic]
  ordo XXVI. BYTTNERIACEÆ
  ordo XXVII. TILIACEÆ
  ordo XXVIII. ELÆOCARPEÆ
  ordo XXIX. CHLENACEÆ
  ordo XXIXbis. ANCISTROCLADEÆ
  ordo XXIXter. DIPTEROCARPEÆ
  ordo XXIXter.[sic] LOPHIRACEÆ
  ordo XXX. TERNSTROEMIACEÆ
  ordo XXXI. CAMELLIEÆ
  ordo XXXII. OLACINEÆ
  ordo XXXIII. AURANTIACEÆ
  ordo XXXIV. HYPERICINEÆ
  ordo XXXV. GUTTIFERÆ
  ordo XXXVI. MARCGRAVIACEÆ
  ordo XXXVII. HIPPOCRATEACEÆ
  ordo XXXVIII. ERYTHROXYLEÆ
  ordo XXXIX. MALPIGHIACEÆ
  ordo XL. ACERINEÆ
  ordo XLI. HIPPOCASTANEÆ
  ordo XLII. RHIZOBOLEÆ
  ordo XLIII. SAPINDACEÆ
  ordo XLIV. MELIACEÆ
  ordo XLV. AMPELIDEÆ
  ordo XLVI. GERANIACEÆ
  ordo XLVII. TROPÆOLEÆ
  ordo XLVIII. BALSAMINEÆ
  ordo XLIX. OXALIDEÆ
  ordo L. ZYGOPHYLLEÆ
  ordo LI. RUTACEÆ
  ordo LII. SIMARUBEÆ [sic]
  ordo LIII. OCHNACEÆ
  ordo LIV. CORIARIEÆ (Page 739)

(Index to Part I p. 741)

==== Subclassis II. CALYCIFLORÆ [Parts II - VII] ====
- ordo LV. CELASTRINEÆ [Part II],(Page 2)
  ordo LVI. RHAMNEÆ
  ordo LVII. BRUNIACEÆ
  ordo LVIII. SAMYDEÆ
  ordo LIX. HOMALINEÆ
  ordo LX. CHAILLETIACEÆ
  ordo LXI. AQUILARINEÆ
  ordo LXII. TEREBINTHACEÆ
  ordo LXIII. LEGUMINOSÆ
  ordo LXIV. ROSACEÆ (Page 525)
  ordo LXV. CALYCANTHEÆ [Part III], (Page 1)
  ordo LXVbis. MONIMIACEÆ
  ordo LXVI. GRANATEÆ
  ordo LXVII. MEMECYLEÆ
  ordo LXVIII. COMBRETACEÆ
  ordo LXIX. VOCHYSIEÆ
  ordo LXX RHIZOPHOREÆ
  ordo LXXI. ONAGRARIEÆ
  ordo LXXII. HALORAGEÆ
  ordo LXXIII. CERATOPHYLLEÆ
  ordo LXXIV. LYTHRARIEÆ
  ordo LXXIVbis. CRYPTERONIACEÆ
  ordo LXXV. TAMARISCINEÆ
  ordo LXXVI. MELASTOMACEÆ
  ordo LXXVII. ALANGIEÆ
  ordo LXXVIII. PHILADELPEÆ
  ordo LXXIX. MYRTACEÆ
  ordo LXXX. CUCURBITACEÆ
  ordo LXXXI. PASSIFLOREÆ
  ordo LXXXII. LOASEÆ
  ordo LXXXIII. TURNERACEÆ
  ordo LXXXIV. FOUQUIERACEÆ
  ordo LXXXV. PORTULACEÆ
  ordo LXXXVI. PARONYCHIEÆ
  ordo LXXXVII. CRASSULACEÆ
  ordo LXXXVIII. FICOIDEÆ (Page 415)
  ordo LXXXIX. CACTEÆ
  ordo XC. GROSSULARIEÆ
  ordo XCI. SAXIFRAGACEÆ [Part IV], (Page 1)
  ordo XCII. UMBELLIFERÆ
  ordo XCIII. ARALIACEÆ
  ordo XCIV. HAMAMELIDEÆ
  ordo XCV. CORNEÆ
  ordo XCVbis. HELWINGIACEÆ
  ordo XCVI. LORANTHACEÆ
  ordo XCVII. CAPRIFOLIACEÆ
  ordo XCVIII. RUBIACEÆ
  ordo XCIX. VALERIANEÆ
  ordo C. DIPSACEÆ (Page 643)
  ordo CI. CALYCEREÆ [Part V], (Page 1)
  ordo CII. COMPOSITÆ (Page 4); [Part VI], (Page 1); [Part VII], (Page 1)
  ordo CIII. STYLIDIEÆ [Part VII]
  ordo CIV. LOBELIACEÆ
  ordo CV. CAMPANULACEÆ
  ordo CVI. CYPHIACEÆ
  ordo CVII. GOODENOVIEÆ
  ordo CVIII. ROUSSÆACEÆ
  ordo CIX. GESNERIACEÆ
  ordo CX. SPHENOCLEACEÆ
  ordo CXI. COLUMELLIACEÆ
  ordo CXII. NAPOLEONEÆ
  ordo CXIII. VACCINIEÆ
  ordo CXIV. ERICACEÆ (Page 580) (Four tribes)
  - Arbuteae (Page 580)
    Andromedae (Page 588)
    Ericeae (Page 612)
    Rhodoreae (Page 712) (Two subtribes)
    - Rhododendreae (712) (Nine genera)
      - Rhododendron (719) (Six sections)
        - Buramia (720)
          Hymenanthes (721)
          Eurhododendron (721)
          Pogonanthum (725)
          Chamaecistus (725)
          Tsutsusi (726)
        Kalmia (728)
      Ledeae (729)
  ordo CXV. EPACRIDEÆ (Page 734)
  ordo CXVI. PYROLACEÆ
  ordo CXVII. FRANCOACEÆ
  ordo CXVIII. MONOTROPEÆ (Page 779)

==== Subclassis III. COROLLIFLORÆ [Parts VIII - XIII(1)] ====
- ordo CXIX. LENTIBULARIEÆ (Page 1)
  ordo CXX. PRIMULACEÆ
  ordo CXXI. MYRSINEACEÆ
  ordo CXXII. ÆGICERACEÆ
  ordo CXXIII. THEOPHRASTACEÆ
  ordo CXXIV. SAPOTACEÆ
  ordo CXXV. EBENACEÆ
  ordo CXXVI. STYRACACEÆ
  ordo CXXVII. OLEACEÆ
  ordo CXXVIIbis. SALVADORACEÆ
  ordo CXXVIII. JASMINEÆ
  ordo CXXIX. APOCYNACEÆ
  ordo CXXX. ASCLEPIADEÆ (Page 460)
  ordo CXXX[a?] LEONIACEÆ
  ordo CXXXI. LOGANIACEÆ [Part IX], (Page 1)
  ordo CXXXII. GENTIANACEÆ
  ordo CXXXIII. BIGNONIACEÆ
  ordo CXXXIV. SESAMEÆ
  ordo CXXXV. CYRTANDRACEÆ
  ordo CXXXVI. HYDROPHYLLACEÆ
  ordo CXXXVII. POLEMONIACEÆ
  ordo CXXXVII. [sic] CONVOLVULACEÆ
  ordo CXXXVIII. ERICYBEÆ
  ordo CXXXIX. BORRAGINEÆ [sic] (Page 466); [Part X], (Page 1)
  ordo CXL. HYDROLEACEÆ
  ordo CXLII. SCROPHULARIACEÆ (Page 186)
  ordo CXLII(I).[sic] SOLANACEÆ [Part XIII (1)], (Pages 1 – 692) out of sequence
  ordo CXLIV. OROBRANCHACEÆ [Part XI], (Page 1)
  ordo CXLV. ACANTHACEÆ
  ordo CXLVI. PHRYMACEÆ
  ordo CXLVII VERBENACEÆ
  ordo CXLVIII MYOPORACEÆ (Page 701)
  ordo CXLIX SELAGINACEÆ [Part XII], (Page 1)
  ordo CL. LABIATÆ
  ordo CLI. STILBACEÆ
  ordo CLII. GLOBULARIACEÆ
  ordo CLIII. BRUNONIACEÆ
  ordo CLIV. PLUMBAGINEÆ (Page 617)
  ordo CLV.[?] PLANTAGINACEÆ [Part XIII], (Page 693)

==== Subclassis IV. MONOCHLAMYDEÆ [Parts XIII(2) - XVI] ====
- ordo CLVI. PHYTOLACCACEÆ (Page 2)
  ordo CLVII. SALSOLACEÆ
  ordo CLVIII. BASELLACEÆ
  ordo CLIX. AMARANTACEÆ [sic]
  ordo CLX. NYCTAGINACEÆ (Page 425)
  ordo CLXI. POLYGONACEÆ [Part XIV], (Pages 1 – 186)
  ordo CLXII. LAURACEÆ [Part XIV], (Page 186); [Part XV(1)], (Pages 1 – 260) out of sequence
  ordo CLXIII. MYRISTICACEÆ (Page 187)
  ordo CLXIV. PROTEACEÆ (Page 209)
  ordo CLXV. PENÆACEÆ
  ordo CLXVI. GEISSOLOMACEÆ (Page 491)
  ordo CLXVII. THYMELÆACEÆ
  ordo CLXVIII. ELÆAGNACEÆ
  ordo CLXIX. GRUBBIACEÆ
  ordo CLXX. SANTALACEÆ (Page 619)
  ordo CLXXI. HERNANDIACEÆ [Part XV(1)], (Page 1)
  ordo CLXXII. BEGONIACEÆ
  ordo CLXXIII. DATISCACEÆ
  ordo CLXXIV. PAPAYACEÆ
  ordo CLXXV. ARISTOLOCHIACEÆ
  ordo CLXXVbis. NEPENTHACEÆ
  ordo CLXXVI. STACKHOUSIACEÆ (Page 419)
  [sic]
  ordo CLXXVIII. EUPHORBIACEÆ [Part XV(2)], (Page 1)
  ordo CLXXIX. DAPHNIPHYLLACEÆ [Part XVI(1)], (Page 1)
  ordo CLXXX. BUXACEÆ
  ordo CLXXXbis. BATIDACEÆ
  ordo CLXXXI. EMPETRACEÆ
  ordo CLXXXII. CANNABINEÆ
  ordo CLXXXIII. ULMACEÆ
  ordo CLXXXIIIbis. MORACEÆ
  ordo CLXXXIV. ARTOCARPEÆ
  ordo CLXXXV. URTICACEÆ
  ordo CLXXXVI. PIPERACEÆ
  [sic]
  ordo CLXXXVIII. CHLORANTHACEÆ
  ordo CLXXXIX. GARRYACEÆ (Page 486)
  ordo CXC. CUPULIFERÆ [Part XVI(2)], (Page 1)
  ordo CXCI. CORYLACEÆ (Page 124)
  ordo CXCII. JUGLANDEÆ (Page 134)
  ordo CXCIII. MYRICACEÆ (Page 147)
  ordo CXCIV. PLATANACEÆ
  ordo CXCV. BETULACEÆ (Page 161)
  ordo CXCVI. SALICINEÆ (Page 190)
  ordo CXCVII CASUARINEÆ (Page 332)

==== Other ====
Somewhat inconsistently the Prodromus also treats:

- GYMNOSPERMÆ [Part XVI(2)], (Page 345)
  ordo CXCVIII. GNETACEÆ (Page 347)
  ordo CXCIX. CONIFERÆ (Page 361)
  ordo CC. CYCADACEÆ (Pages 522 - 547)
- incertæ sedis
  ordo (dubiæ affin.) LENNOACEÆ
  ordo (affin. dubiæ) PODOSTEMACEÆ
  ordo num.? CYTINACEÆ
  ordo incertae sedis BALANOPHORACEÆ

(Overall Index Part XVII Page 323)

== Bibliography ==
- Buek, H.W. (1840–1874). Genera, species et synonyma Candolleana: alphabetico ordine disposita, seu Index generalis et specialis ad A.P. Decandolle, Prodromum systematis naturalis regni vegetabilis. Berlin: Sumptibus librariae Nauckianae.

=== De Candolle ===
- de Candolle, Augustin Pyramus (1818–1821). Regni vegetabilis systema naturale, sive Ordines, genera et species plantarum secundum methodi naturalis normas digestarum et descriptarum 2 vols. Paris: Treuttel et Würtz.
- de Candolle, AP (1819) [1813]. Théorie élémentaire de la botanique, ou exposition des principes de la classification naturelle et de l'art de décrire et d'etudier les végétaux (2nd ed.).
- de Candolle, AP (1824–1873). Prodromus systemati naturalis regni vegetabilis sive enumeratio contracta ordinum, generum specierumque plantarum huc usque cognitarum, juxta methodi naturalis normas digesta. (also available online at Gallica)
- de Lamarck, Jean-Baptiste; de Candolle, Augustin Pyramus (1815a). Flore française ou descriptions succinctes de toutes les plantes qui croissent naturellement en France disposées selon une nouvelle méthode d'analyse; et précédées par un exposé des principes élémentaires de la botanique (vol. III) (3 ed.). Paris: Desray.
  - de Lamarck, Jean-Baptiste; de Candolle, Augustin Pyramus (1805). Principes élémentaires de botanique et de physique végétale (extract) (3 ed.). Paris: Desray.
- de Lamarck, Jean-Baptiste; de Candolle, Augustin Pyramus (1815b). Flore française ou descriptions succinctes de toutes les plantes qui croissent naturellement en France disposées selon une nouvelle méthode d'analyse; et précédées par un exposé des principes élémentaires de la botanique (vol. V) (3 ed.). Paris: Desray.
