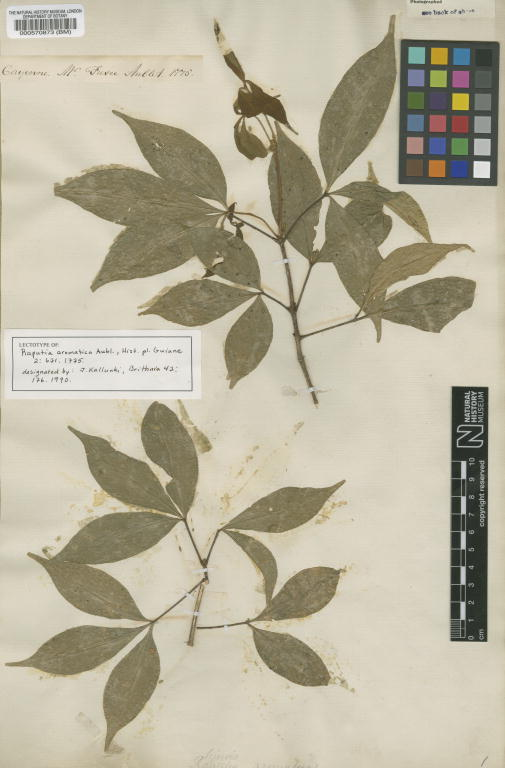
- Raputia aromatica Aubl

Scientific classification
- Kingdom: Plantae
- Clade: Tracheophytes
- Clade: Angiosperms
- Clade: Eudicots
- Clade: Rosids
- Order: Sapindales
- Family: Rutaceae
- Subfamily: Zanthoxyloideae
- Genus: Raputia; Aubl.

= Raputia =

Genus of plants

Raputia is a genus of flowering plants belonging to the family Rutaceae.

Its native range is Southern Tropical America.

Species:

- Raputia amazonica (Huber) Kallunki
- Raputia aromatica Aubl.
- Raputia brevipedunculata Kallunki
- Raputia codo-pozuzoensis Rob.Fernandez & Arteaga
- Raputia hirsuta (Gereau) Kallunki
- Raputia maroana (R.S.Cowan) Kallunki
- Raputia megalantha Kallunki
- Raputia neblinensis (R.S.Cowan) Kallunki
- Raputia praetermissa Pirani & Kallunki
- Raputia simulans Kallunki
- Raputia szczerbanii (Steyerm.) Kallunki
- Raputia ulei (K.Krause) Kallunki
