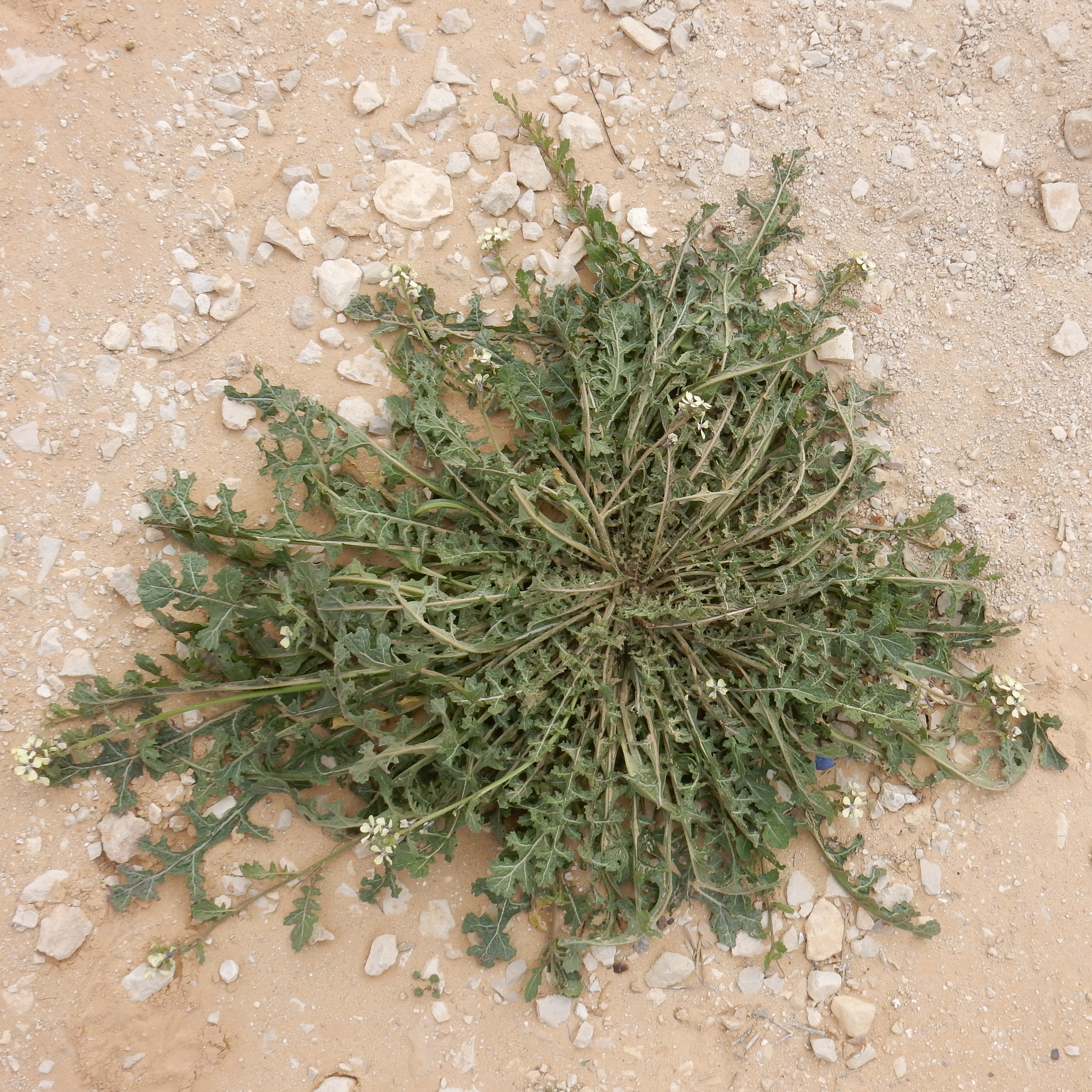
- Enarthrocarpus strangulatus (a species within the genus)

Scientific classification
- Kingdom: Plantae
- Clade: Tracheophytes
- Clade: Angiosperms
- Clade: Eudicots
- Clade: Rosids
- Order: Brassicales
- Family: Brassicaceae
- Genus: Enarthrocarpus; Labill.

= Enarthrocarpus =

Genus of plants

Enarthrocarpus is a genus of flowering plants belonging to the family Brassicaceae.

Its native range is Bulgaria to Arabian Peninsula.

Species:

- Enarthrocarpus arcuatus Labill.
- Enarthrocarpus clavatus Delile ex Godr.
- Enarthrocarpus lyratus (Forssk.) DC.
- Enarthrocarpus pterocarpus (Pers.) DC.
- Enarthrocarpus strangulatus Boiss.
