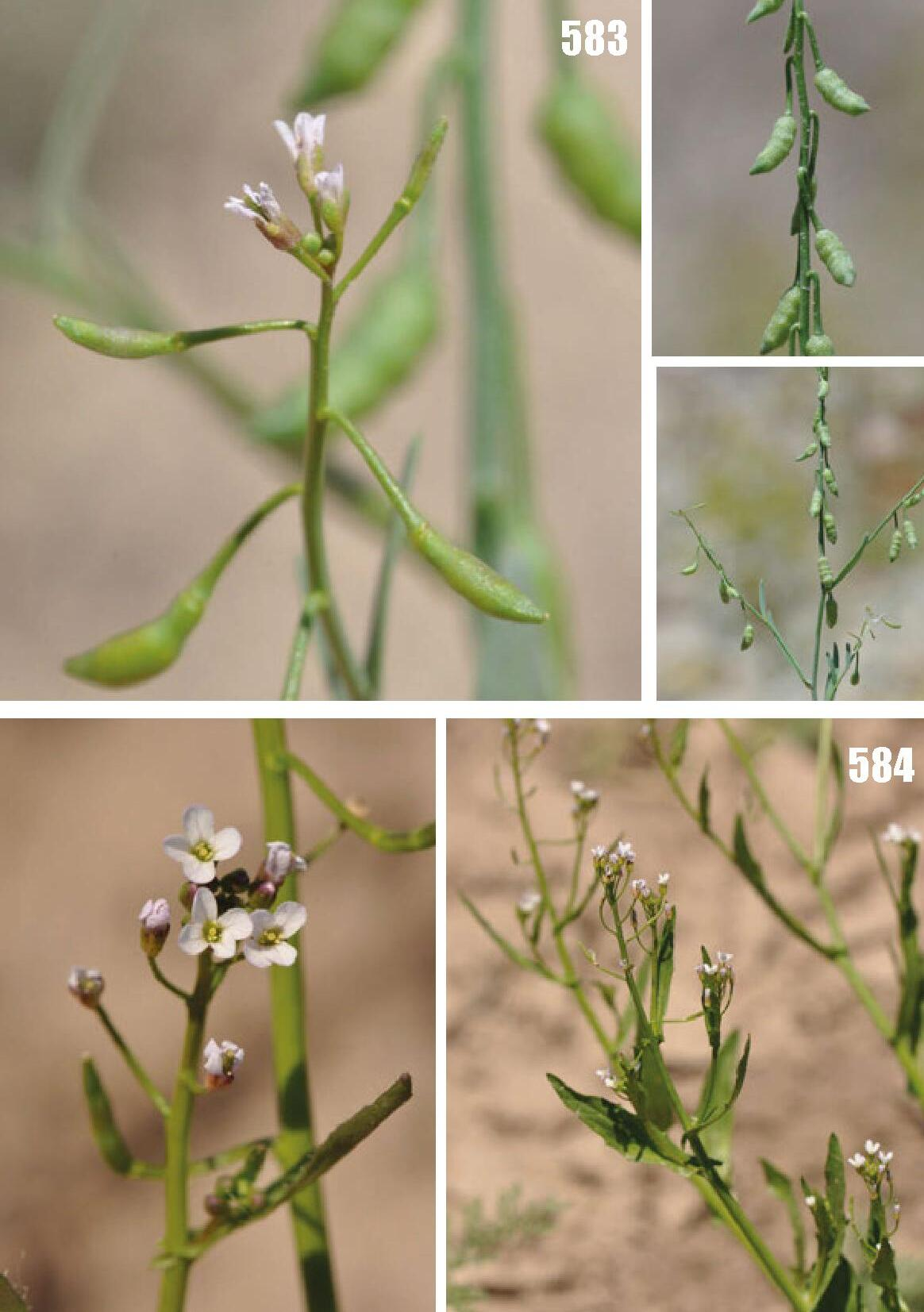
- Goldbachia pendula and Goldbachia torulosa

Scientific classification
- Kingdom: Plantae
- Clade: Tracheophytes
- Clade: Angiosperms
- Clade: Eudicots
- Clade: Rosids
- Order: Brassicales
- Family: Brassicaceae
- Genus: Goldbachia; DC.

Synonyms
- Anguillicarpus Burkill; Spirorhynchus Kar. & Kir.

= Goldbachia =

Genus of plants

Goldbachia is a genus of flowering plants belonging to the family Brassicaceae.

== General description ==
Goldbachia are annual, herbaceous plants. They lack trichomes (hairs) and have branched stems.

The basal leaves are petiolate (without stalk), entire, and dentate (with toothed margins). Some species are rosulate (in a rosette), while others are not. The cauline leaves are sessile, auriculate (rarely they are not) or amplexicaul (clasping the stem) at the base, and entire, with the margins either repand (a slightly undulating margin) or dentate. The cotyledons (primary leaves) are incumbent.

The racemes are ebracteate (having no bracts) and elongated when in fruit. Fruiting pedicels are filiform (thread-like), recurved or reflexed, and articulate at the base or both ends. The sepals are ovate or oblong shaped, suberect, base of lateral pair, and either not saccate (pouch shaped) or sub-saccate. The petals are white, pink, or purplish and are longer than the sepals. The blade is spatulate (spoon shaped) with an obtuse apex. The claw is different than the sepals. It has 6 stamens, which are slightly tetradynamous (four of which are longer than the others). The median filament pairs are flattened at the base, with the lateral pair filiform. The anthers are ovate and obtuse at the apex. It has 4 nectar glands, which are minute; the median glands are free or confluent with laterals. The lateral glands are semi-annular and intrastaminal (inside the stamens). The ovules are 1-3 per ovary, and are subapical.

The fruit (seed capsule) is an indehiscent nutlet-like silicle or silicula, often breaking into 1-seeded units, and are oblong, ovoid, or ellipsoid. They are 1-loculed or transversely 2- or 3-loculed, terete (circular in cross-section) or 4-angled, sessile, woody, often prominently veined, glabrous or papillate (paper-like), smooth or torulose (a cylindrical or ellipsoid body; swollen and constricted at intervals). It is sometimes verrucose-reticulate; replum (a framework-like placenta) rounded; septum absent; style absent, obsolete, or distinct, thickened and sub-conical; stigma capitate, entire. The seeds are uniseriate (arranged in a single row), wingless, oblong and plump. The seed coat is smooth, and not mucilaginous (having a viscous or gelatinous consistency) when damp.

== Taxonomy ==
The genus name of Goldbachia is in honour of Carl Ludwig Goldbach (1793–1824), German-born Russian professor of botany in Moscow, and it was first described and published by Augustin Pyramus de Candolle in Carl Linnaeus's book Syst. Nat. Vol.2 on page 576 in 1821.

== Known species ==
Includes 7 accepted Species, according to Kew;

- Goldbachia ikonnikovii Vassilcz.
- Goldbachia laevigata DC.
- Goldbachia pendula Botsch.
- Goldbachia sabulosa (Kar. & Kir.) D.A.German & Al-Shehbaz
- Goldbachia tetragona Ledeb.
- Goldbachia torulosa DC.
- Goldbachia verrucosa Kom.

The genus was verified by United States Department of Agriculture and the Agricultural Research Service on 31 July 2018.

== Range and habitat ==
Its native range is eastern Europe, Transcaucasia, to Mongolia and Pakistan.

It is found in the countries of Afghanistan, China (including the regions of Xinjiang, Inner Mongolia and Qinghai), Iran, Iraq, Kazakhstan, Kyrgyzstan, Lebanon-Syria, Mongolia, Pakistan, Saudi Arabia, Tajikistan, Tibet, Turkey, Turkmenistan, Tuva (part of Russia), Uzbekistan, and western Siberia.

Goldbachia laevigata, Goldbachia pendula and Goldbachia ikonnikovii are found in China.
