= Pugionium =

Scientific classification
- Kingdom: Plantae
- Clade: Tracheophytes
- Clade: Angiosperms
- Clade: Eudicots
- Clade: Rosids
- Order: Brassicales
- Family: Brassicaceae
- Genus: Pugionium; Gaertn.

Genus of plants

Pugionium is a genus of flowering plants belonging to the family Brassicaceae.

Its native range is Southwestern Siberia to Northern China.

Species:

- Pugionium cornutum (L.) Gaertn.
- Pugionium dolabratum Maxim.
- Pugionium pterocarpum Kom.
