= Didesmus =

Scientific classification
- Kingdom: Plantae
- Clade: Tracheophytes
- Clade: Angiosperms
- Clade: Eudicots
- Clade: Rosids
- Order: Brassicales
- Family: Brassicaceae
- Genus: Didesmus; Desv.

Synonyms
- Didesmis G.Don

Genus of plants

Didesmus is a genus of flowering plants belonging to the family Brassicaceae.

Its native range is Mediterranean region.

Species:

- Didesmus aegyptius (L.) Desv.
- Didesmus bipinnatus (Desf.) DC.
