= Sobolewskia =

Scientific classification
- Kingdom: Plantae
- Clade: Embryophytes
- Clade: Tracheophytes
- Clade: Spermatophytes
- Clade: Angiosperms
- Clade: Eudicots
- Clade: Rosids
- Order: Brassicales
- Family: Brassicaceae
- Genus: Sobolewskia; M.Bieb.

Synonyms
- Macrosporum DC.

Genus of flowering plants

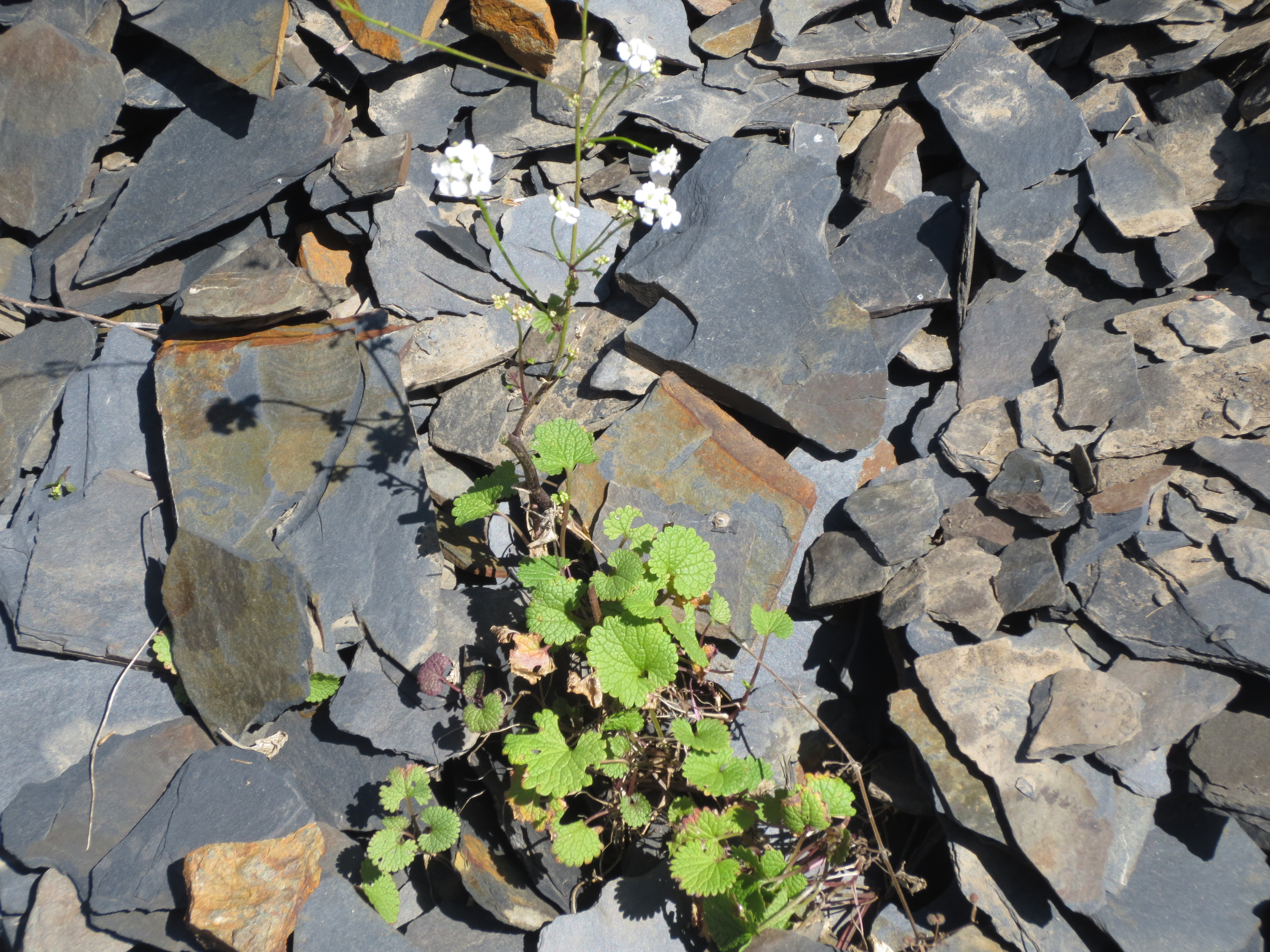
Sobolewskia caucasica

Sobolewskia is a genus of flowering plants belonging to the family Brassicaceae.

Its native range is from Crimea, Turkey to the Caucasus.

The genus name of Sobolewskia is in honour of Gregor Federovitch Sobolewsky or (otherwise spelt) Gregoriy Federowich Sobolewski (1741–1807), a Russian military doctor, botanist and mycologist. He was also botanical garden director in Saint Petersburg and a professor of botany. It was first described and published in Fl. Taur.-Caucas. Vol.3 on page 421 in 1819.

== Known species ==
According to Kew:

- Sobolewskia caucasica (Rupr.) N.Busch
- Sobolewskia clavata (Boiss.) Fenzl
- Sobolewskia sibirica (Willd.) P.W.Ball
- Sobolewskia truncata N.Busch
