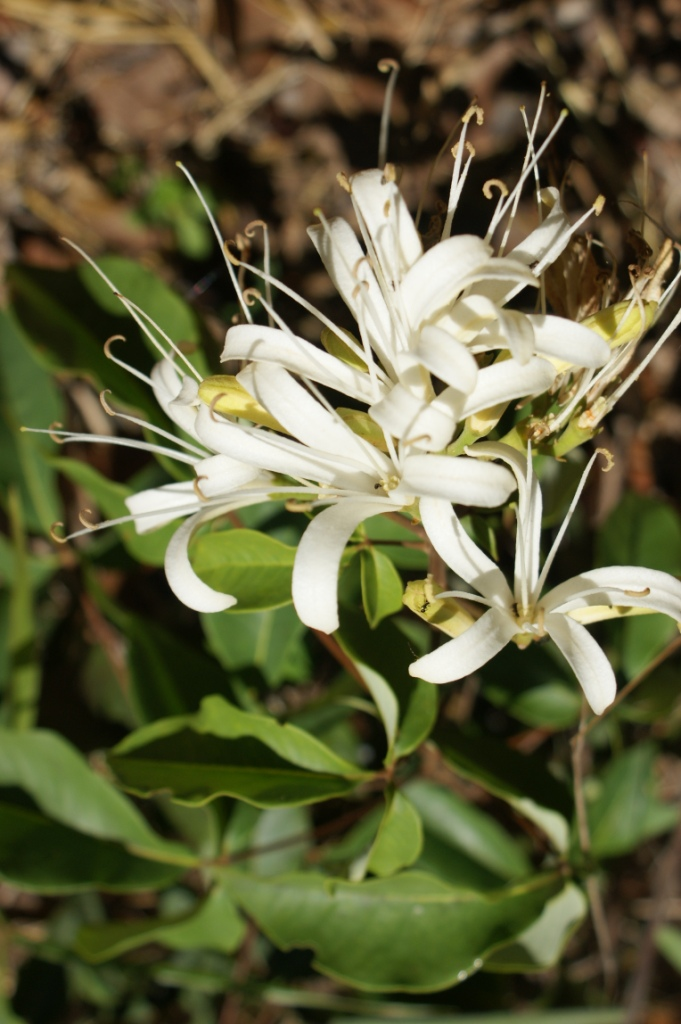
- Spiranthera odoratissima

Scientific classification
- Kingdom: Plantae
- Clade: Tracheophytes
- Clade: Angiosperms
- Clade: Eudicots
- Clade: Rosids
- Order: Sapindales
- Family: Rutaceae
- Subfamily: Zanthoxyloideae
- Genus: Spiranthera; A.St.-Hil. (1823)

Species
- Six; see text

Synonyms
- Nycticalanthus Ducke (1932); Terpnanthus Nees & Mart. (1823)

= Spiranthera =

Genus of flowering plants

For other uses, see Spiranthera (disambiguation)

Spiranthera is a genus of flowering plants in the family Rutaceae. It includes six species native to tropical South America.

- Spiranthera atlantica Pirani
- Spiranthera guianensis Sandwith
- Spiranthera odoratissima A.St.-Hil.
- Spiranthera parviflora Sandwith
- Spiranthera peruviana L.A.Brito & Pirani
- Spiranthera speciosa (Ducke) L.A.Brito & Pirani
