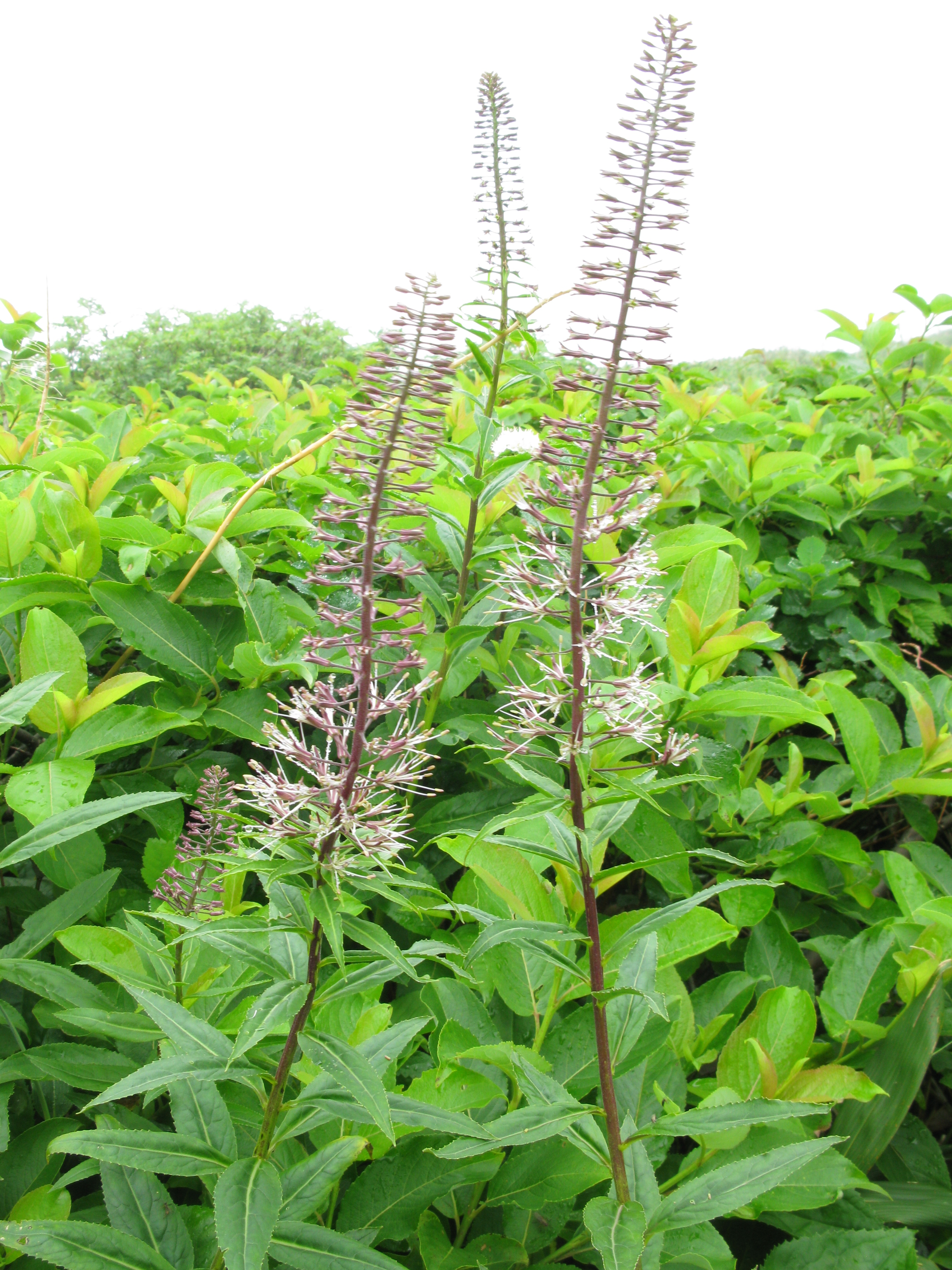
- Macropodium pterospermum

Scientific classification
- Kingdom: Plantae
- Clade: Tracheophytes
- Clade: Angiosperms
- Clade: Eudicots
- Clade: Rosids
- Order: Brassicales
- Family: Brassicaceae
- Tribe: Stevenieae
- Genus: Macropodium; W.T.Aiton

= Macropodium =

Genus of plants

Macropodium is a genus of flowering plants belonging to the family Brassicaceae.

Its native range is Central Asia to Russian Far East and Mongolia.

== Species ==
Species:

- Macropodium nivale (Pall.) W.T.Aiton
- Macropodium pterospermum F.Schmidt
