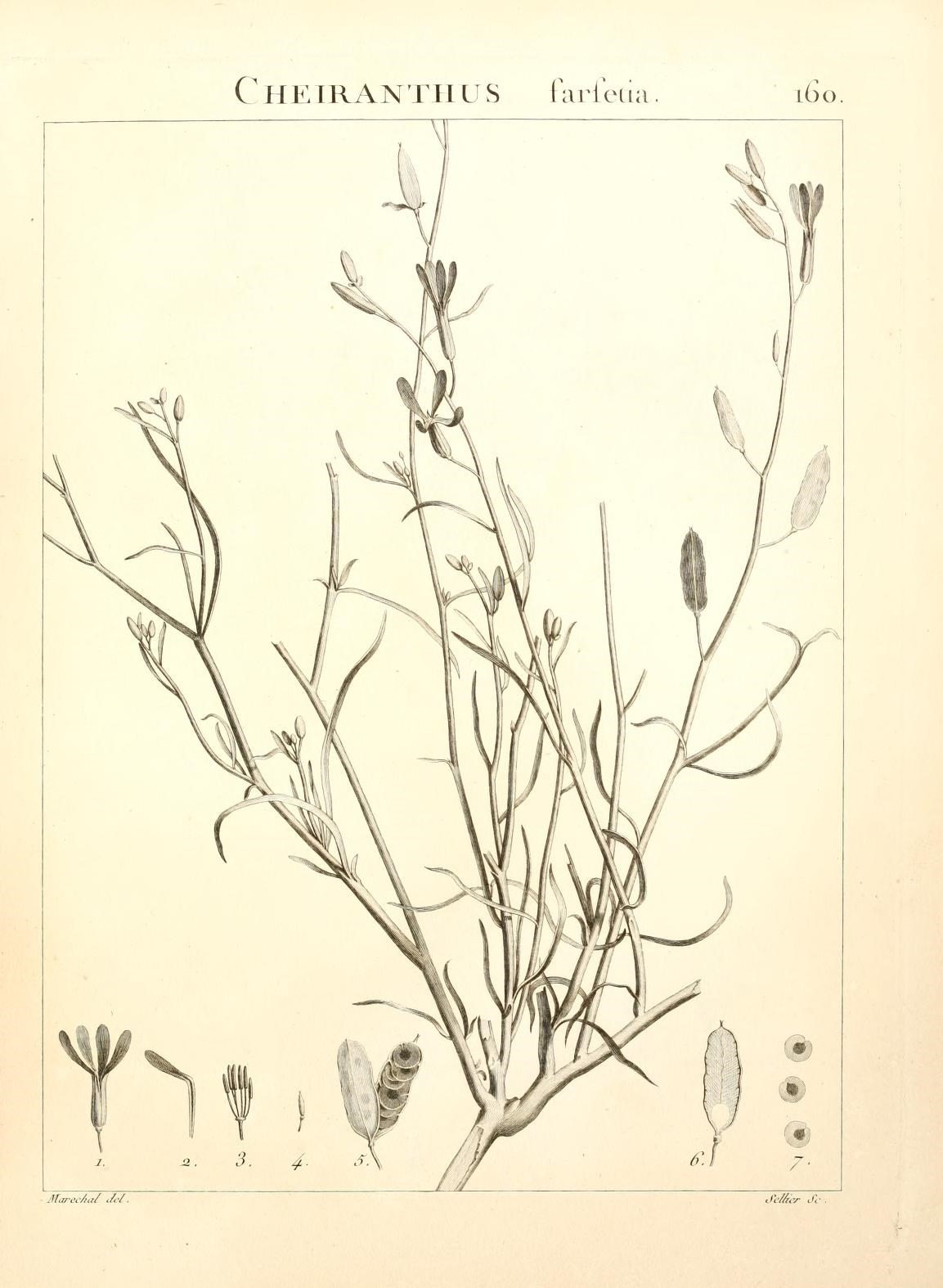
- Farsetia aegyptia
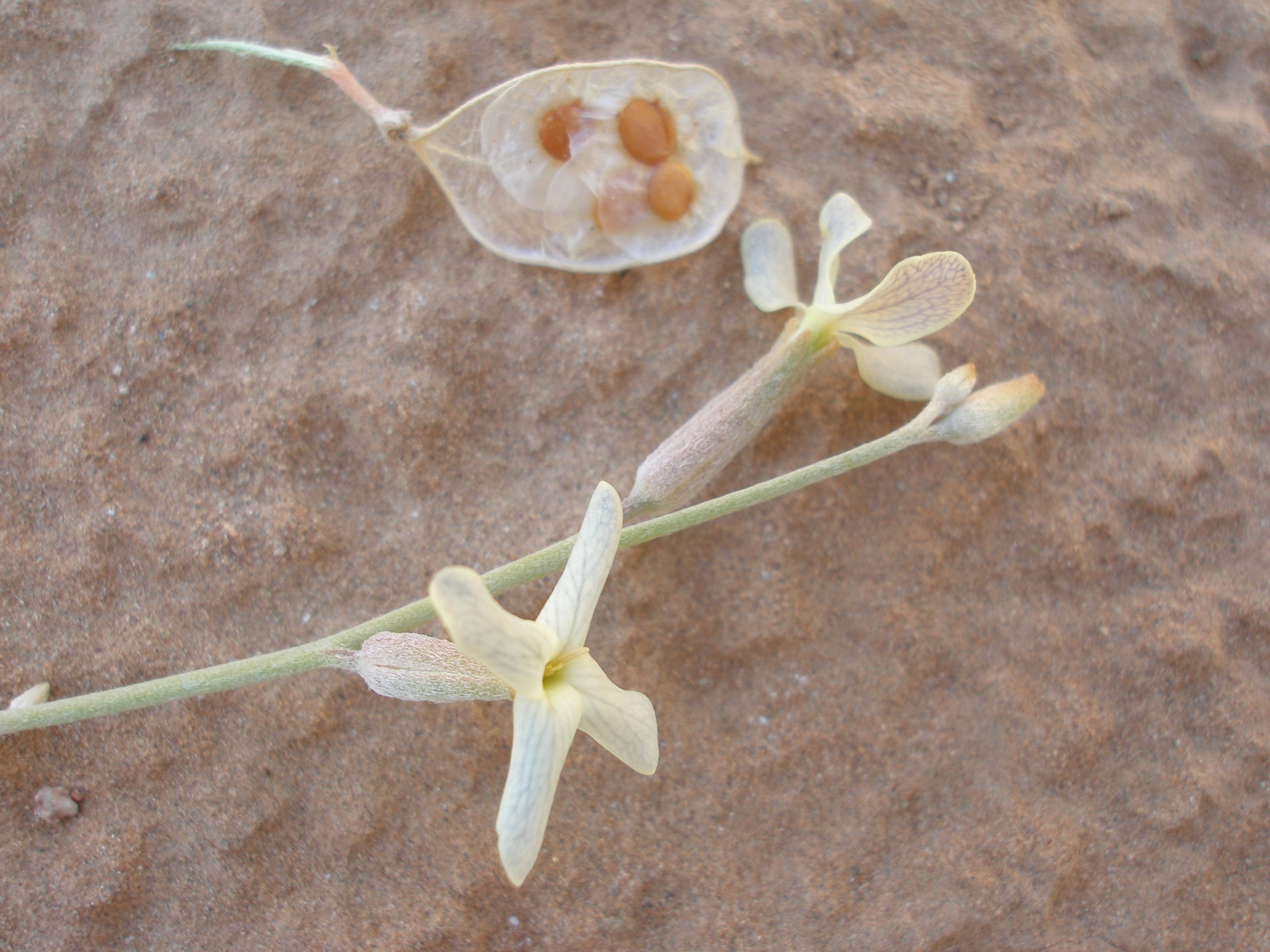

Scientific classification
- Kingdom: Plantae
- Clade: Tracheophytes
- Clade: Angiosperms
- Clade: Eudicots
- Clade: Rosids
- Order: Brassicales
- Family: Brassicaceae
- Genus: Farsetia; Turra (1765)

Synonyms
- Cleomodendron Pax

= Farsetia =

Genus of flowering plants

Farsetia is a genus of flowering plants in the family Brassicaceae. It includes 28 species native to northern, west-central, and Eastern Africa, the Arabian Peninsula, Western Asia, Pakistan, and India.

== Species ==
There are 28 species assigned to this genus:

- Farsetia aegyptia Turra
- Farsetia assadii Kavousi
- Farsetia burtoniae Oliv.
- Farsetia cornus-africani Jonsell
- Farsetia dhofarica Jonsell & A.G.Mill.
- Farsetia divaricata Jonsell
- Farsetia ellenbeckii Engl.
- Farsetia emarginata Jonsell
- Farsetia fruticans Jonsell & Thulin
- Farsetia heliophila Bunge ex Coss.
- Farsetia inconspicua A.G.Mill.
- Farsetia jacquemontii Hook.f. & Thomson
- Farsetia latifolia Jonsell & A.G.Mill.
- Farsetia linearis Decne. ex Boiss.
- Farsetia longisiliqua Decne.
- Farsetia longistyla Baker
- Farsetia macrantha Blatt. & Hallb.
- Farsetia nummularia Jonsell
- Farsetia occidentalis B.L.Burtt
- Farsetia pedicellata Jonsell
- Farsetia robecchiana Engl.
- Farsetia socotrana B.L.Burtt
- Farsetia somalensis (Pax) Engl. ex Gilg & Benedict
- Farsetia spinulosa Jonsell
- Farsetia stenoptera Hochst.
- Farsetia stylosa R.Br.
- Farsetia tenuisiliqua Jonsell
- Farsetia undulicarpa Jonsell
