= Pigea =

- Pigea monopetala

Scientific classification
- Kingdom: Plantae
- Clade: Tracheophytes
- Clade: Angiosperms
- Clade: Eudicots
- Clade: Rosids
- Order: Malpighiales
- Family: Violaceae
- Genus: Pigea; Ging.

Synonyms
- Afrohybanthus Flicker; Vlamingia de Vriese

Genus of plants

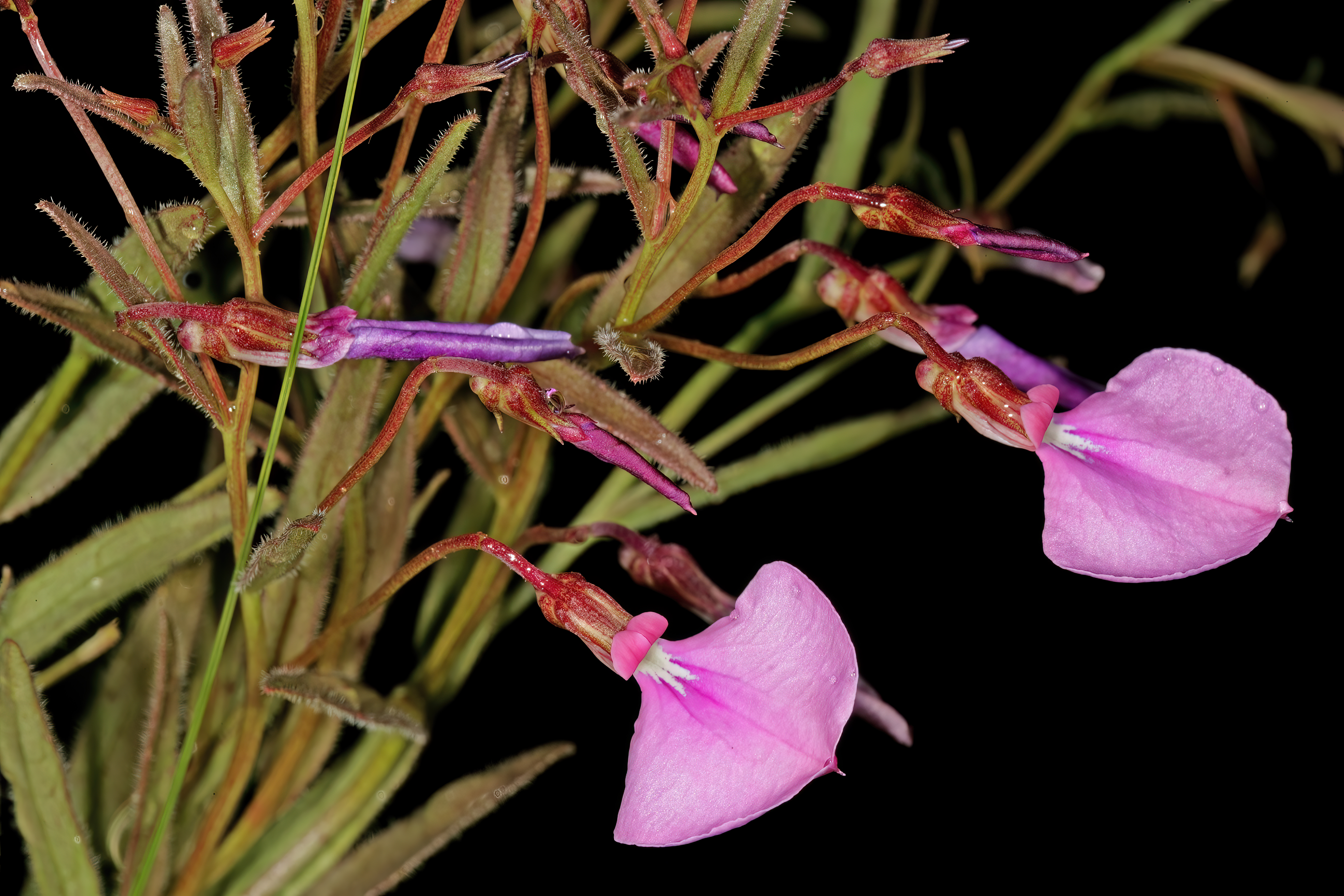
Pigea enneasperma flowers in Umtamvuna Nature Reserve, South Africa

Pigea is a genus of flowering plants belonging to the family Violaceae.

Its native range is tropical and southern Africa, Madagascar, and tropical Asia to Australia.

== Species ==
31 species are accepted.

- Pigea adpressa (E.M.Benn.) P.I.Forst.
- Pigea aurantiaca (F.Muell. ex Benth.) P.I.Forst.
- Pigea bennettiae (R.L.Barrett) P.I.Forst.
- Pigea buxifolia (Vent.) P.I.Forst.
- Pigea caffra (Sond.) P.I.Forst.
- Pigea calycina DC.
- Pigea curvifolia (E.M.Benn.) P.I.Forst.
- Pigea cymulosa (C.A.Gardner) P.I.Forst.
- Pigea danguyana (H.Perrier) P.I.Forst.
- Pigea debilissima (F.Muell.) P.I.Forst.
- Pigea decaryana (H.Perrier) P.I.Forst.
- Pigea densifolia (Engl.) P.I.Forst.
- Pigea enneasperma (L.) P.I.Forst.
- Pigea epacroides (C.A.Gardner) P.I.Forst.
- Pigea fasciculata (Grey-Wilson) P.I.Forst.
- Pigea floribunda Lindl.
- Pigea indica (S.K.Kamble & B.J.Patil) P.I.Forst.
- Pigea latifolia (De Wild.) P.I.Forst.
- Pigea monopetala (Schult.) Ging.
- Pigea nyassensis (Engl.) P.I.Forst.
- Pigea pseudodanguyana (Grey-Wilson) P.I.Forst.
- Pigea puberula (M.G.Gilbert) P.I.Forst.
- Pigea ramosissima (Thwaites) P.I.Forst.
- Pigea serrata (Engl.) P.I.Forst.
- Pigea stellarioides (Domin) P.I.Forst.
- Pigea travancorica (Bedd.) P.I.Forst.
- Pigea tsavoensis (Grey-Wilson) P.I.Forst.
- Pigea vatsavayae (C.S.Reddy) P.I.Forst.
- Pigea verbi-divini (Everaarts) P.I.Forst.
- Pigea vernonii (F.Muell.) P.I.Forst.
- Pigea volubilis (E.M.Benn.) P.I.Forst.
