= Morettia =

Scientific classification
- Kingdom: Plantae
- Clade: Tracheophytes
- Clade: Angiosperms
- Clade: Eudicots
- Clade: Rosids
- Order: Brassicales
- Family: Brassicaceae
- Genus: Morettia; DC.

Synonyms
- Nectouxia DC.

Genus of flowering plant

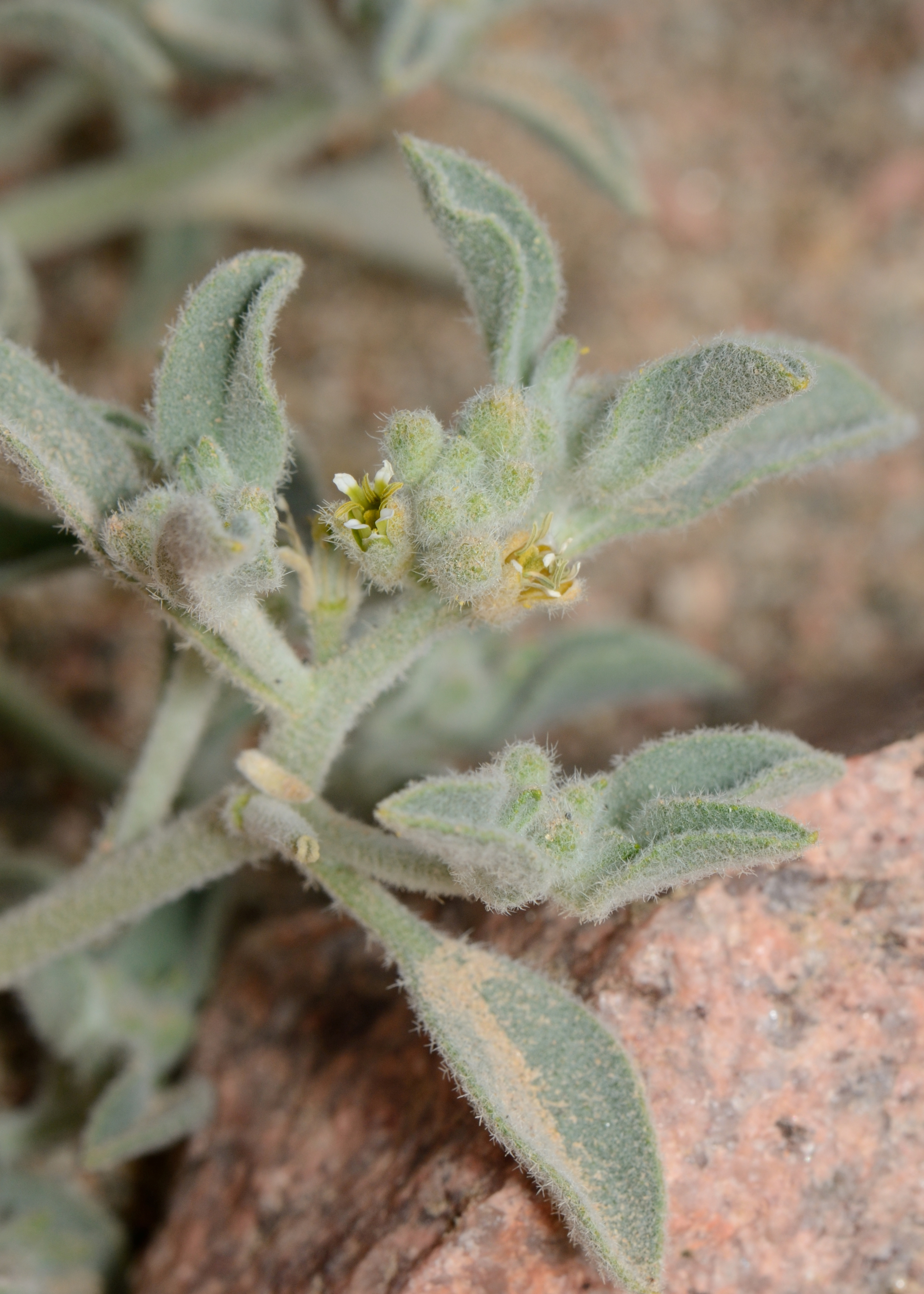
Morettia parviflora boiss, Eilat, Israel

Morettia is a genus of flowering plants belonging to the family Brassicaceae.

Its native range is southern and eastern Mediterranean to the Sahara and the Arabian Peninsula. It is found in the countries of Algeria, Chad, Egypt, the Gulf States, Libya, Mali, Mauritania, Morocco, Niger, Oman, Palestine, Saudi Arabia, Sinai, Sudan, Tunisia and Yemen.

The genus name of Morettia is in honour of Giuseppe Moretti (1782–1853), an Italian botanist. It was first described and published in Mém. Mus. Hist. Nat. Vol.7 on page 236 in 1821.

== Known species ==
According to Kew:

- Morettia canescens Boiss.
- Morettia kilianii Al-Shehbaz
- Morettia parviflora Boiss.
- Morettia philaeana (Delile) DC.
