= Hybanthopsis =

Scientific classification
- Kingdom: Plantae
- Clade: Embryophytes
- Clade: Tracheophytes
- Clade: Spermatophytes
- Clade: Angiosperms
- Clade: Eudicots
- Clade: Rosids
- Order: Malpighiales
- Family: Violaceae
- Subfamily: Violoideae
- Tribe: Violeae
- Genus: Hybanthopsis; Paula-Souza
- Species: H. bahiensis

Binomial name
- Hybanthopsis bahiensis Paula-Souza

Genus of flowering plants found in Brazil

Hybanthopsis is a genus of flowering plants in the violet family Violaceae, with a single accepted species (Hybanthopsis bahiensis), found in north-east Brazil.

== Description ==
Twining herbaceous Lianas with ovate-lanceolate leaves. The solitary flowers, with a violet corolla, are strongly zygomorphic (bilaterally symmetrical) with the very large bottom petal differentiated into a claw and blade and are saccate (pouch like) at the base. On the five stamens, the filaments are weakly connate (fused) with the two lowest anthers weakly calcarate (spurred) and possessing a large dorsal connective appendage that is entire and oblongovate. In the gynoecium, the style is filiform-rostellate (threadlike and beaked). The fruit is a thin walled elastic follicle dehiscing by a single longitudinal suture. There are several seeds per carpel, that are obovoid with a pair of basal-lateral expansions.

== Taxonomy ==
The genus Hybanthopsis was first described by Paula-Souza in 2003, with a single species, Hybanthopsis bahiensis which thus is considered the type species. Therefore, the genus bears the name, Paula-Souza, as the botanical authority. The genus resembled the previously described Hybanthus in floral structure, but with important distinctions in terms of seed and fruit morphology, which are unique among neotropical Violaceae. Only one species of Hybanthus is a twining plant, and the floral structure is quite different to two of the other lianescent genera, Anchietea and Calyptrion but closer to that of Agatea, while the seeds more closely resemble Anchietea.

Hybanthopsis is one of four lianescent genera in Violaceae, together with Calyptrion Ging., Agatea A.Gray and Anchietea Paula-Souza. Historically, these genera were distributed among separate subtribes, with Anchietea within subtribe Violinae with Calyptrion and Hybanthopsis and Agatea in subtribe Hybanthinae. Molecular phylogenetic studies have now grouped these four genera together into a single lianescent clade, one of four within the family Violaceae.

=== Etymology ===
The genus Hybanthopsis is named after the genus Hybanthus from which it is differentiated, the suffix -opsis indicating similarity in Greek (Ancient Greek: ὄψις). The specific epithet bahiensis indicates its discovery in Bahia.

=== Species ===
Hybanthopsis is a monotypic genus, with a single species:

- Hybanthopsis bahiensis Paula-Souza

== Distribution and habitat ==
Arid deciduous forests (caatingas) of central and east Bahia, North-east Brazil, particularly disturbed areas such as forest borders and the roadside.

== Bibliography ==
Books and theses

- Ballard, Harvey E; Paula-Souza, Juliana de; Wahlert, Gregory A (2013). "Violaceae". In Kubitzki, Klaus (ed.). Flowering Plants. 11 Eudicots: Malpighiales. Springer Science & Business Media. pp. 303–322. ISBN 978-3-642-39417-1.(Also preview at Springer)
- Byng, James W. (2014). "Violaceae". The Flowering Plants Handbook: A practical guide to families and genera of the world. Plant Gateway Ltd. pp. 238–239. ISBN 978-0-9929993-1-5.
- Christenhusz, Maarten J. M.; Fay, Michael F.; Chase, Mark W. (2017). "Violaceae". Plants of the World: An Illustrated Encyclopedia of Vascular Plants. University of Chicago Press. pp. 324–325. ISBN 978-0-226-52292-0.
- Paula-Souza, Juliana de; Pirani, José Rubens (2014). "A biogeographical overview of the "lianescent clade" of Violaceae in the Neotropical region". In Greer, Francis Eliott (ed.). Dry Forests: Ecology, Species Diversity and Sustainable Management. Environmental Science, Engineering and Technology. Nova Science Publishers. pp. 1–28. ISBN 978-1-63321-291-6.
- Souza, Juliana de Paula (2009). "Hybanthopsis". Estudos filogenéticos em Violaceae com ênfase na tribo Violeae e revisão taxonômica dos gêneros Lianescentes de Violaceae na região [Neotropical Phylogenetic studies on tribe Violeae and taxonomic revision of the Neotropical Lianescent genera of Violaceae] (PhD thesis) (in Brazilian Portuguese). Instituto de Biociências, Universidade de São Paulo. pp. 175–182.

Articles

- de Paula-Souza, Juliana; Souza, Vinicius Castro (July 2003). "Hybanthopsis, a new genus of Violaceae from Eastern Brazil". Brittonia. 55 (3): 209–213. doi:10.1663/0007-196X(2003)055[0209:HANGOV]2.0.CO;2.
- de Paula-Souza, Juliana; Pirani, José Rubens (22 December 2014). "Reestablishment of Calyptrion (Violaceae)". Taxon. 63 (6): 1335–1339. doi:10.12705/636.7.
- Wahlert, Gregory A.; Marcussen, Thomas; de Paula-Souza, Juliana; Feng, Min; Ballard, Harvey E. (1 March 2014). "A Phylogeny of the Violaceae (Malpighiales) Inferred from Plastid DNA Sequences: Implications for Generic Diversity and Intrafamilial Classification". Systematic Botany. 39 (1): 239–252. doi:10.1600/036364414X678008. S2CID 86452033.

Websites

- WFO (2020). "Hybanthopsis Paula-Souza Brittonia 55(3): 210–213, f. 1, 2A–E. 2003". World Flora Online.
- POTWO. "Hybanthopsis Paula-Souza". Plants of the World Online. Royal Botanic Gardens, Kew.
- IPNI. "Hybanthopsis Paula-Souza, Brittonia 55(3): 210 (2003)". Royal Botanic Gardens, Kew.
- "Hybanthopsis Paula-Souza". Tropicos. Missouri Botanical Garden. 2020.
- Herman, P P J (2015). "Botanical glossary" (PDF). SANBI. Archived from the original (PDF) on 18 October 2020.
