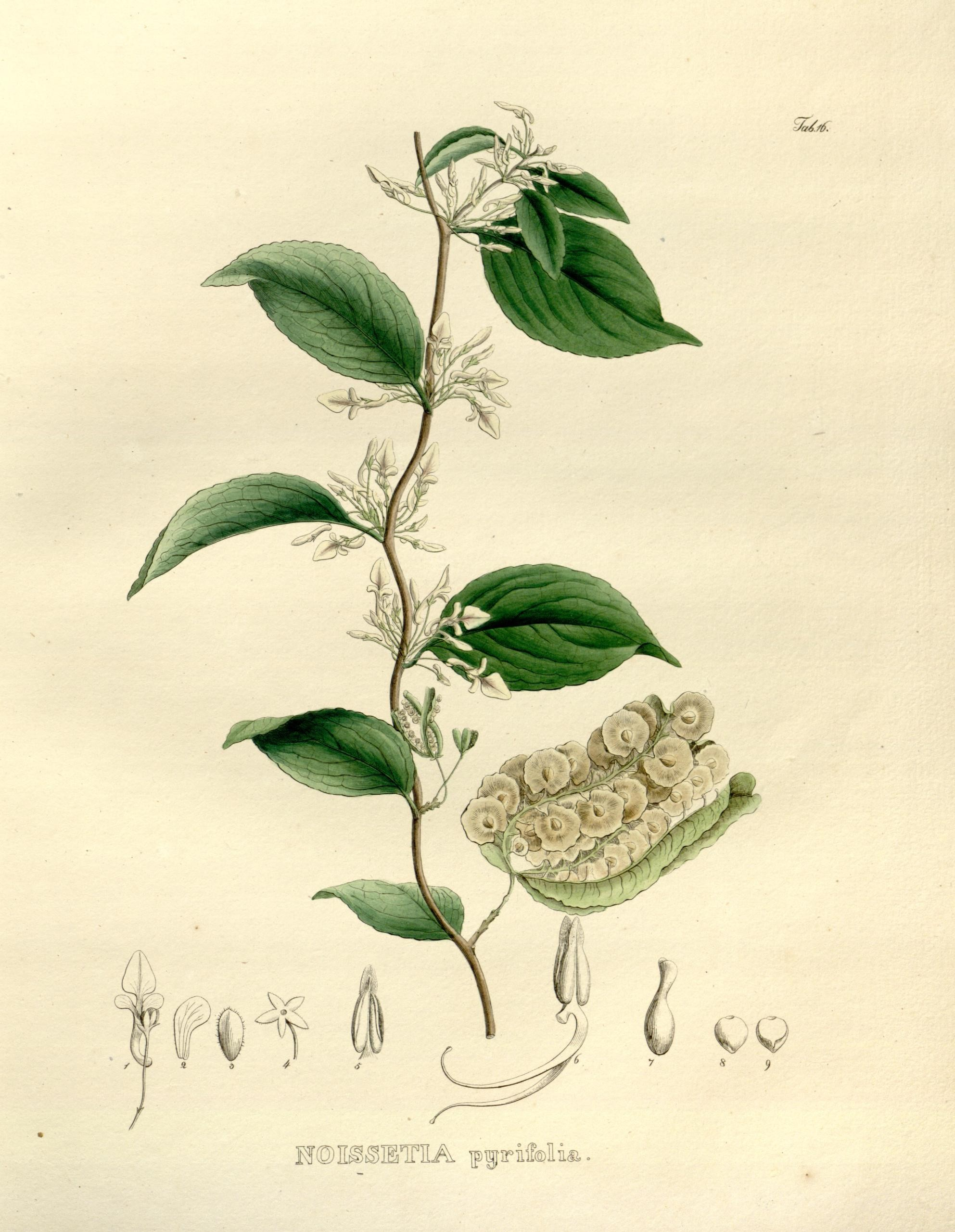
- Anchietea pyrifolia

Scientific classification
- Kingdom: Plantae
- Clade: Embryophytes
- Clade: Tracheophytes
- Clade: Spermatophytes
- Clade: Angiosperms
- Clade: Eudicots
- Clade: Rosids
- Order: Malpighiales
- Family: Violaceae
- Subfamily: Violoideae
- Tribe: Violeae
- Genus: Anchietea; A.St.-Hil.

Type species
- Anchietea pyrifolia (Mart.) G.Don

Species
- Six (see text)

= Anchietea =

Genus of flowering plants

Anchietea is a genus of flowering plants in the violet family Violaceae, with six accepted species, found in tropical South America.

== Description ==
Lianas or reclining shrubs with oblong-lanceolate to ovate leaves. The flowers, which may be unisexual or bisexual, are in axillary racemoids or fascicles, with a white to orange corollas that are strongly zygomorphic (bilaterally symmetrical) with the long bottom petal weakly differentiated with a well exserted (projecting) spur. On the five stamens, the filaments are strongly connate (fused) with the two lowest anthers calcarate (spurred) and possessing a small dorsal connective appendage that is entire and ovate. In the gynoecium, the style is rostellate (beaked). The fruit is a very thin walled bladder-like capsule. There are many seeds per carpel, that are orbicular in outline and strongly flattened and encircled with a low interrupted ridge, or broad wing. The genus is characterized by membranaceous inflated capsules that usually prematurely expose the strongly flattened seeds to maturation.

== Taxonomy ==
The genus Anchietea was first described by Saint-Hilaire in 1824, with a single species Anchietea salutaris, which thus is considered the type species. Therefore, the genus bears his name, A.St.-Hil., as the botanical authority. Shortly before this, Martius had described a species in a related genera, Noisettia pyrifolia. In 1831, Don transferred this species to Anchietea, noting that the specific epithet pyrifolia referred to "pear-shaped leaves". A revision of the genus in 2013 identified A. salutaris and A. pyrifolia as conspecific, and since A. pyrifolia had priority (as Noisettia pyrifolia) it is the type species.

Early taxonomic schemes, primarily based on floral morphology, such as Bentham and Hooker (1862) placed Anchietea within subfamily Violoideae, tribe Violeae, subtribe Violinae. Anchietea is one of four lianescent genera in Violaceae, together with Calyptrion Ging., Agatea A.Gray and the more recently discovered (2003) Hybanthopsis Paula-Souza. Historically, these genera were distributed among separate subtribes, with Anchietea within subtribe Violinae with Calyptrion and Hybanthopsis and Agatea in subtribe Hybanthinae.

Molecular phylogenetic studies have now grouped these four genera together into a single lianescent clade, one of four within the family Violaceae.

=== Etymology ===
The genus Anchietea is named for the sixteenth century Jesuit missionary and naturalist Joseph of Anchieta, who described the Brazilian flora.

=== Species ===
Eight species are accepted.

- Anchietea ballardii Paula-Souza
- Anchietea exaltata Eichler
- Anchietea ferrucciae Paula-Souza & Zmarzty
- Anchietea frangulifolia (Kunth) Melch.
- Anchietea peruviana Melch.
- Anchietea pyrifolia (Mart.) G.Don
- Anchietea raimondii Melch.
- Anchietea sellowiana Cham. & Schltdl.

Estimates of the number of species in Anchietea has varied considerably between five and nine, but historically, the genus has been poorly described and new species have continued to be described. Paula-Souza and colleagues recognize six species, having added A. ferrucciae in 2010 as a new description and A. ballardii in 2016.

== Distribution and habitat ==
Extra-Amazonian South America, in the seasonally-dry tropical forests (SDTF) of South America.

== Bibliography ==
Books and theses

- Ballard, Harvey E; Paula-Souza, Juliana de; Wahlert, Gregory A (2013). "Violaceae". In Kubitzki, Klaus (ed.). Flowering Plants. 11 Eudicots: Malpighiales. Springer Science & Business Media. pp. 303–322. ISBN 978-3-642-39417-1.(Also preview at Springer)
- Bentham, G.; Hooker, J.D. (1862). "Violarieae". Genera plantarum ad exemplaria imprimis in herbariis kewensibus servata definita (3 vols.). Vol. 1. London: L Reeve & Co. pp. 114–121.
- Byng, James W. (2014). "Violaceae". The Flowering Plants Handbook: A practical guide to families and genera of the world. Plant Gateway Ltd. pp. 238–239. ISBN 978-0-9929993-1-5.
- Christenhusz, Maarten J. M.; Fay, Michael F.; Chase, Mark W. (2017). "Violaceae". Plants of the World: An Illustrated Encyclopedia of Vascular Plants. University of Chicago Press. pp. 324–325. ISBN 978-0-226-52292-0.
- Don, George (1831). "Anchietea". A general history of the dichlamydeous plants: comprising complete descriptions of the different orders...the whole arranged according to the natural system IV vols. Vol. 1. London: J.G. and F. Rivington. p. 340.
- Paula-Souza, Juliana de; Pirani, José Rubens (2014). "A biogeographical overview of the "lianescent clade" of Violaceae in the Neotropical region". In Greer, Francis Eliott (ed.). Dry Forests: Ecology, Species Diversity and Sustainable Management. Environmental Science, Engineering and Technology. Nova Science Publishers. pp. 1–28. ISBN 978-1-63321-291-6.
- Quattrocchi, Umberto (2000). "Anchietea". CRC world dictionary of plant names: common names, scientific names, eponyms, synonyms, and etymology. 4 vols. Vol. 1. A-C. Boca Raton, FL: CRC Press. p. 131. ISBN 0-8493-2673-7.
- Paula-Souza, Juliana (2009). "Anchietea". Estudos filogenéticos em Violaceae com ênfase na tribo Violeae e revisão taxonômica dos gêneros Lianescentes de Violaceae na região [Neotropical Phylogenetic studies on tribe Violeae and taxonomic revision of the Neotropical Lianescent genera of Violaceae] (PhD thesis) (in Brazilian Portuguese). Instituto de Biociências, Universidade de São Paulo. pp. 65–120.

Articles

- Martius, Karl Friedrich Philipp von (1824). "Noisettia pyrifolia". Nova genera et species plantarum :quas in itinere per Brasiliam MDCCCXVII-MDCCCXX jussu et auspiciis Maximiliani Josephi I., Bavariae regis augustissimi instituto. 3 vols (in Latin). Vol. 1. Munich: Lindaueri. pp. 24–25.
- Paula-Souza, J. De; Zmarzty, S. (July 2010). "Anchietea ferrucciae (Violaceae), a new species from the Brazilian Caatinga". Phytotaxa. 7 (1): 40–45. doi:10.11646/phytotaxa.7.1.5.
- Paula-Souza, Juliana de; Rubens Pirani, Jose; Hoffmann, Matthias H; Röser, Martin (2013). "Reappraisal of names and lectotype designations in the South American genus Anchietea (Violaceae)". Schlechtendalia. 25: 63–68.
- de Paula-Souza, Juliana; Pirani, José Rubens (22 December 2014). "Reestablishment of Calyptrion (Violaceae)". Taxon. 63 (6): 1335–1339. doi:10.12705/636.7.
- de Paula-Souza, Juliana; Souza, Vinicius Castro (July 2003). "Hybanthopsis, a new genus of Violaceae from Eastern Brazil". Brittonia. 55 (3): 209–213. doi:10.1663/0007-196X(2003)055[0209:HANGOV]2.0.CO;2. S2CID 9681796.
- de Paula-Souza, Juliana; Pirani, José Rubens (14 October 2016). "Novelties in Brazilian Anchietea A.St.-Hil. (Violaceae): A new species from inselbergs in the Atlantic rainforest and an update on the conservation status of Anchietea ferrucciae Paula-Souza & Zmarzty". Phytotaxa. 280 (1): 63. doi:10.11646/phytotaxa.280.1.6.
- Saint-Hilaire, A.F.C.P (1824). "Indication abrégée des plantes de la flore du Brésil méridional, qui appartiennent au groupe des Droséracées, des Violacées, des Cistées et des Frankeniées". Annales des Sciences Naturelles (in Latin). 2: 248–255.
- Wahlert, Gregory A.; Marcussen, Thomas; de Paula-Souza, Juliana; Feng, Min; Ballard, Harvey E. (1 March 2014). "A Phylogeny of the Violaceae (Malpighiales) Inferred from Plastid DNA Sequences: Implications for Generic Diversity and Intrafamilial Classification". Systematic Botany. 39 (1): 239–252. doi:10.1600/036364414X678008. S2CID 86452033.

Websites

- WFO (2019). "Anchietea A. St.-Hil. Ann. Sci. Nat. (Paris) 2: 252. 1824". World Flora Online.
- POTWO. "Anchietea A.St.-Hil". Plants of the World Online. Royal Botanic Gardens, Kew.
- IPNI. "Anchietea A.St.-Hil., Ann. Sci. Nat. (Paris) 2: 252 (1824)". Royal Botanic Gardens, Kew.
- "Anchietea A. St.-Hil". Tropicos. Missouri Botanical Garden. 2020.
- "Brazil Researcher Names New Species After Colleague Harvey Ballard". College of Arts & Sciences, Ohio University. 28 October 2016.
