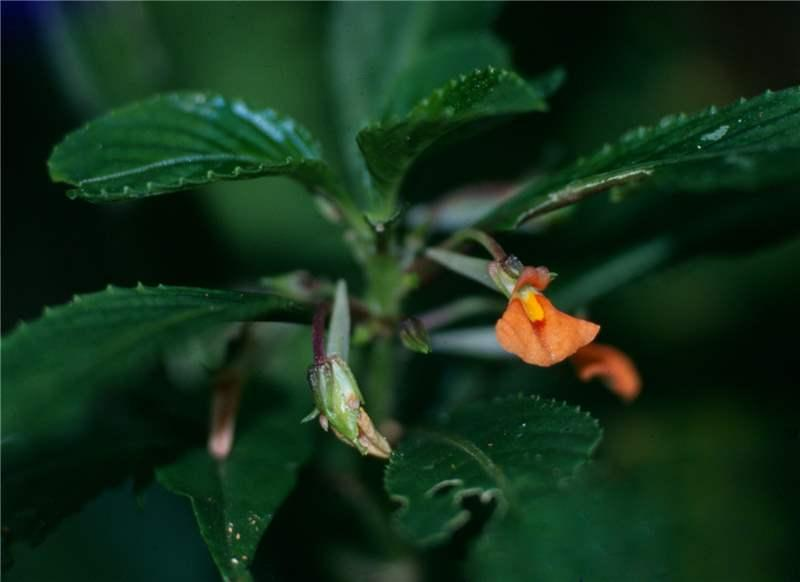

Scientific classification
- Kingdom: Plantae
- Clade: Embryophytes
- Clade: Tracheophytes
- Clade: Spermatophytes
- Clade: Angiosperms
- Clade: Eudicots
- Clade: Rosids
- Order: Malpighiales
- Family: Violaceae
- Subfamily: Violoideae
- Tribe: Violeae
- Genus: Noisettia; Kunth
- Species: N. orchidiflora

Binomial name
- Noisettia orchidiflora (Rudge) Ging.

Synonyms
- Jonidiopsis C.Presl; Violaeoides Michx. ex DC.

= Noisettia =

Genus of flowering plants

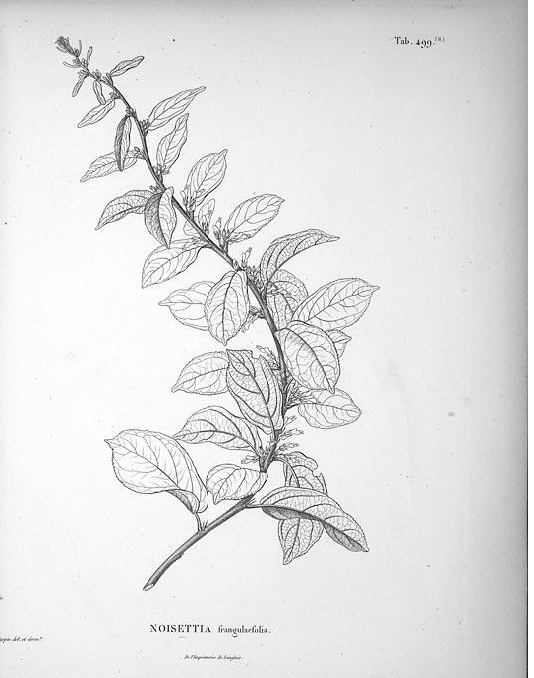
Noisettia frangulaefolia Original illustration by Kunth, 1821

Noisettia is a genus of flowering plants in the violet family Violaceae, with a single known species.

== Description ==
Shrubs, with oblanceolate (wider near tip) leaves. White flowers strongly zygomorphic (bilaterally symmetrical), in axillary fascicles. The corolla, which persists to cover the fruit is orange in colour with a yellow throat and with the bottom petal longer than the others and clawed with a very long spur. The stamens have free filaments, with the lowest two being calcarate (spurred) and possessing a large dorsal connective appendage that is entire and oblong-ovate. In the gynoecium, the style is rostellate (beaked). The fruit is a thick-walled capsule with 3–4 obovoid or papillate seeds per carpel.

== Taxonomy ==
The genus Noisettia was first described by Kunth in 1821, with two species Noisetia frangulaefolia and N. orinocensis, placing it in the family Violeae, with five other genera. de Candolle included Noisettia in his Violarieae in 1824, with three species and at the same time Martius was describing N. pyrifolia, although this species was later transferred to the related genus, Anchietea. In 1846, Lindley classified it in Violaceae, within the Violales, although Bentham and Hooker (1862) called the family Violarieae.

Historically Noisettia was placed within Violaceae in subfamily Violoideae, tribe Violeae, subtribe Violinae, together with Anchietea, Calyptrion, Schweiggeria and Viola, following Lindley's description of Tribe Violeae. But these divisions have been shown to be artificial and not monophyletic. Molecular phylogenetic studies show that Violaceae is best considered as four clades rather than taxonomic ranks. Noisettia occurs in Clade I of the family, consisting of Viola, Schweiggeria, Noisettia and Allexis, in which Schweiggeria and Noisettia are monotypic and form a sister group to Viola. Clade 1 represents a subset of the original Violinae, together with the West African Allexis, previously included in tribe Rinoreeae subtribe Rinoreinae.

=== Etymology ===
Kunth named the genus in honour of the horticulturalist Louis Claude Noisette (1772–1849).

=== Subdivision ===
Candolle (1824) recognised three species, considering Kunth's N. frangulaefolia to be a synonym of N. longifolia;

- Noisettia longifolia Kunth
- Noisettia orchidiflora Ging.
- Noisettia acuminata DC.

of which N. longifolia is considered a synonym of N. orchidiflora, and only the latter is accepted by Plants of the World Online, while N. acuminata is classified as "ambiguous" (unable to reliably identify taxon). Most authors consider Noisettia to be monotypic for N. orchidiflora. N. orchidiflora has a large number of other synonyms.

=== Species ===
Noisettia orchidoflora was first described by Rudge in 1805. Rudge believing it to be a species of Viola, gave it the name of Viola orchidoflora, observing that the enlarged lower petal resembled that of an orchid. With the separation of Noisettia from Viola by Kunth in 1821, Gingins (1823) considered Kunth's original N. frangulaefolia, as N. longifolia.

== Distribution and habitat ==
Humid coastal forests of Northern and eastern South America, including North, Northeast, South and Southeast Brazil, French Guiana, Peru, and Suriname (see Map, at Plants of The World Online).

== Bibliography ==
Books

- Ballard, Harvey E; Paula-Souza, Juliana de; Wahlert, Gregory A (2013). "Violaceae". In Kubitzki, Klaus (ed.). Flowering Plants. 11 Eudicots: Malpighiales. Springer Science & Business Media. pp. 303–322. ISBN 978-3-642-39417-1.(Also preview at Springer)
- Bentham, G.; Hooker, J.D. (1862). "Violarieae". Genera plantarum ad exemplaria imprimis in herbariis kewensibus servata definita (3 vols.). Vol. 1. London: L Reeve & Co. pp. 114–121.
- Bonpland, Aimé; Humboldt, Alexander von; Kunth, Karl Sigismund (1815–1825). "Noisettia". Nova genera et species plantarum :quas in peregrinatione ad plagam aequinoctialem orbis novi collegerunt /descripserunt, partim adumbraverunt Amat. Bonpland et Alex. de Humboldt; ex schedis autographis Amati Bonplandi in ordinem digessit Carol. Sigismund. Kunth ... 7 vols. Vol. 5. Antwerp: Christophori Plantini. pp. 382–385.
- Byng, James W. (2014). "Violaceae". The Flowering Plants Handbook: A practical guide to families and genera of the world. Plant Gateway Ltd. pp. 238–239. ISBN 978-0-9929993-1-5.
- de Candolle, A. P. (1824–1873). "Noisettia". Prodromus systematis naturalis regni vegetabilis, sive, Enumeratio contracta ordinum generum specierumque plantarum huc usque cognitarium, juxta methodi naturalis, normas digesta 17 vols. Vol. 1. Paris: Treuttel et Würtz. p. 290.
- Christenhusz, Maarten J. M.; Fay, Michael F.; Chase, Mark W. (2017). "Violaceae". Plants of the World: An Illustrated Encyclopedia of Vascular Plants. University of Chicago Press. pp. 324–325. ISBN 978-0-226-52292-0.
- Lindley, John (1846). "Violaceae". The Vegetable Kingdom: or, The structure, classification, and uses of plants, illustrated upon the natural system (1st ed.). London: Bradbury. pp. 338–339.
- Martius, Karl Friedrich Philipp von (1824). "Noisettia ". Nova genera et species plantarum :quas in itinere per Brasiliam MDCCCXVII-MDCCCXX jussu et auspiciis Maximiliani Josephi I., Bavariae regis augustissimi instituto. 3 vols (in Latin). Vol. 1. Munich: Lindaueri. pp. 23–25.
- Quattrocchi, Umberto (2000). "Noisettia". CRC world dictionary of plant names: common names, scientific names, eponyms, synonyms, and etymology. 4 vols. Vol. 3. M-Q. Boca Raton, FL: CRC Press. p. 1829. ISBN 978-0-8493-2677-6.
- Rudge, Edward (1805). "Viola orchidiflora". Plantarum Guianae rariorum icones et descriptiones hactenus ineditae (in Latin). London: Sumptibus auctoris. pp. 11–12.

Articles

- Ballard, Harvey E.; Sytsma, Kenneth J.; Kowal, Robert R. (October 1998). "Shrinking the Violets: Phylogenetic Relationships of Infrageneric Groups in Viola (Violaceae) Based on Internal Transcribed Spacer DNA Sequences" (PDF). Systematic Botany. 23 (4): 439. doi:10.2307/2419376. JSTOR 2419376.
- Gingins, F de (1823). "Mémoires sur la Famille des Violacees". Mémoires de la Société de physique et d'histoire naturelle de Genève. 2 (1): 1–27.
- Paula-Souza, Juliana de; Rubens Pirani, Jose; Hoffmann, Matthias H; Röser, Martin (2013). "Reappraisal of names and lectotype designations in the South American genus Anchietea (Violaceae)". Schlechtendalia. 25: 63–68.
- Wahlert, Gregory A.; Marcussen, Thomas; de Paula-Souza, Juliana; Feng, Min; Ballard, Harvey E. (1 March 2014). "A Phylogeny of the Violaceae (Malpighiales) Inferred from Plastid DNA Sequences: Implications for Generic Diversity and Intrafamilial Classification". Systematic Botany. 39 (1): 239–252. doi:10.1600/036364414X678008. S2CID 86452033.
- Yockteng, R.; Jr Ballard, H. E.; Mansion, G.; Dajoz, I.; Nadot, S. (1 November 2003). "Relationships among pansies ( Viola section Melanium ) investigated using ITS and ISSR markers". Plant Systematics and Evolution. 241 (3–4): 153–170. Bibcode:2003PSyEv.241..153Y. doi:10.1007/s00606-003-0045-7. JSTOR 23645153. S2CID 25104565.

Websites

- WFO (2019). "Noisettia Kunth". World Flora Online.
- POTWO. "Noisettia Kunth". Plants of the World Online. Royal Botanic Gardens, Kew.
- IPNI. "Noisettia Kunth, Nov. Gen. Sp. [H.B.K.]". Royal Botanic Gardens, Kew.
- "Noisettia orchidiflora (Rudge) Ging.". Tropicos. Missouri Botanical Garden. 2020.
- INPN (2020). "Noisettia orchidiflora (Rudge) Ging., 1824". Inventaire National du Patrimoine Naturel. Muséum national d’Histoire naturelle.
