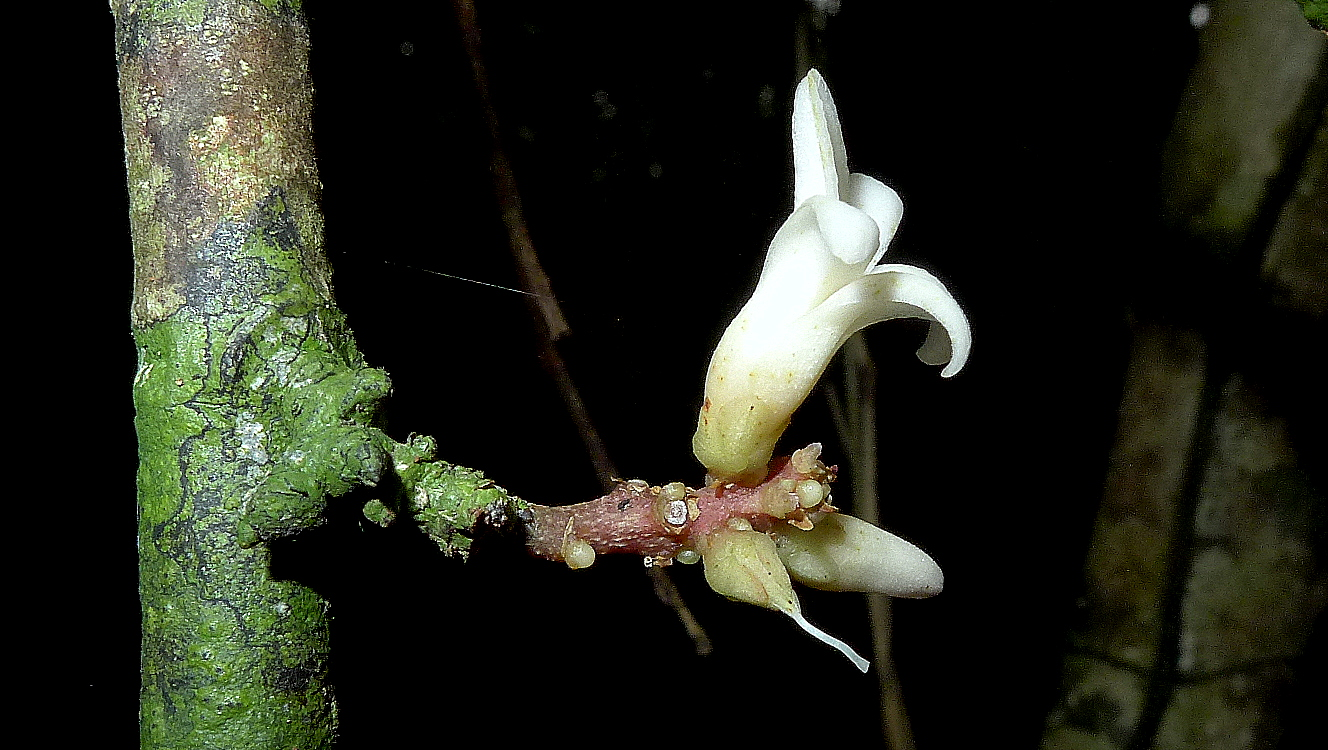

Conservation status
- Least Concern (IUCN 3.1)

Scientific classification
- Kingdom: Plantae
- Clade: Tracheophytes
- Clade: Angiosperms
- Clade: Eudicots
- Clade: Rosids
- Order: Malpighiales
- Family: Violaceae
- Genus: Paypayrola
- Species: P. blanchetiana

Binomial name
- Paypayrola blanchetiana Tul.

= Paypayrola blanchetiana =

Species of flowering plant

Paypayrola blanchetiana is a species of flowering plant in the family Violaceae. It is found in Eastern Brazil. It is a tree and mainly grows in the wet tropical biome.
