= Galium hardhamiae =

Hardham's bedstraw

Scientific classification
- Kingdom: Plantae
- Clade: Tracheophytes
- Clade: Angiosperms
- Clade: Eudicots
- Clade: Asterids
- Order: Gentianales
- Family: Rubiaceae
- Genus: Galium
- Species: G. hardhamiae

Binomial name
- Galium hardhamiae Dempster

Synonyms
- Galium hardhamae Dempster, orth. var.

Species of plant

Galium hardhamiae is a species of flowering plant in the coffee family Rubiaceae, known by the common name Hardham's bedstraw. The scientific name may be misspelled Galium hardhamae. It is endemic to the Santa Lucia Range of southern Monterey County and northern San Luis Obispo County in California. It is a member of the serpentine soils flora in these coastal mountains. This is a perennial herb forming mats or clumps of stems no more than 30 centimeters long. The stems have many whorls of six fleshy green leaves, each leaf just 1 to 3 millimeters long. The inflorescences, clusters of yellow-green to pinkish flowers, appear in leaf axils.

== Taxonomy ==
The species was first described by Lauramay T. Dempster in 1962. Dempster spelt the epithet "hardhamae", honouring Clare Butterworth Hardham. Article 60.8(b) of the International Code of Nomenclature for algae, fungi, and plants provides that adjectival specific epithets formed from personal names should have the genitive ending of the appropriate gender, with -i- added before the ending when the personal name ends in a consonant. Epithets not formed in this way are treated as errors to be corrected. The International Plant Names Index has corrected Dempster's spelling to hardhamiae, a correction followed by, among other sources, Plants of the World Online and Tropicos.
