= Paypayrola guianensis =

Conservation status
- Least Concern (IUCN 3.1)

Scientific classification
- Kingdom: Plantae
- Clade: Tracheophytes
- Clade: Angiosperms
- Clade: Eudicots
- Clade: Rosids
- Order: Malpighiales
- Family: Violaceae
- Genus: Paypayrola
- Species: P. guianensis

Binomial name
- Paypayrola guianensis Aubl.

Species of flowering plant

Paypayrola guianensis is a species of plant in the family Violaceae. Its range extends from Panama to Guyana.
