= Fusispermum laxiflorum =

Conservation status
- Least Concern (IUCN 3.1)

Scientific classification
- Kingdom: Plantae
- Clade: Tracheophytes
- Clade: Angiosperms
- Clade: Eudicots
- Clade: Rosids
- Order: Malpighiales
- Family: Violaceae
- Genus: Fusispermum
- Species: F. laxiflorum

Binomial name
- Fusispermum laxiflorum Hekking

Species of plant

Fusispermum laxiflorum is a species of plant in the Violaceae family. Its range extends from Costa Rica to Peru. It is a tree that grows mainly in the wet tropical biome.
