= Orthion guatemalense =

Conservation status
- Endangered (IUCN 3.1)

Scientific classification
- Kingdom: Plantae
- Clade: Tracheophytes
- Clade: Angiosperms
- Clade: Eudicots
- Clade: Rosids
- Order: Malpighiales
- Family: Violaceae
- Genus: Orthion
- Species: O. guatemalense

Binomial name
- Orthion guatemalense Lundell

Species of plant

Orthion guatemalense is a species of plant in the family Violaceae. Its native range is from Central America to Northern Colombia. It is a tree and grows primarily in the wet tropical biome.
