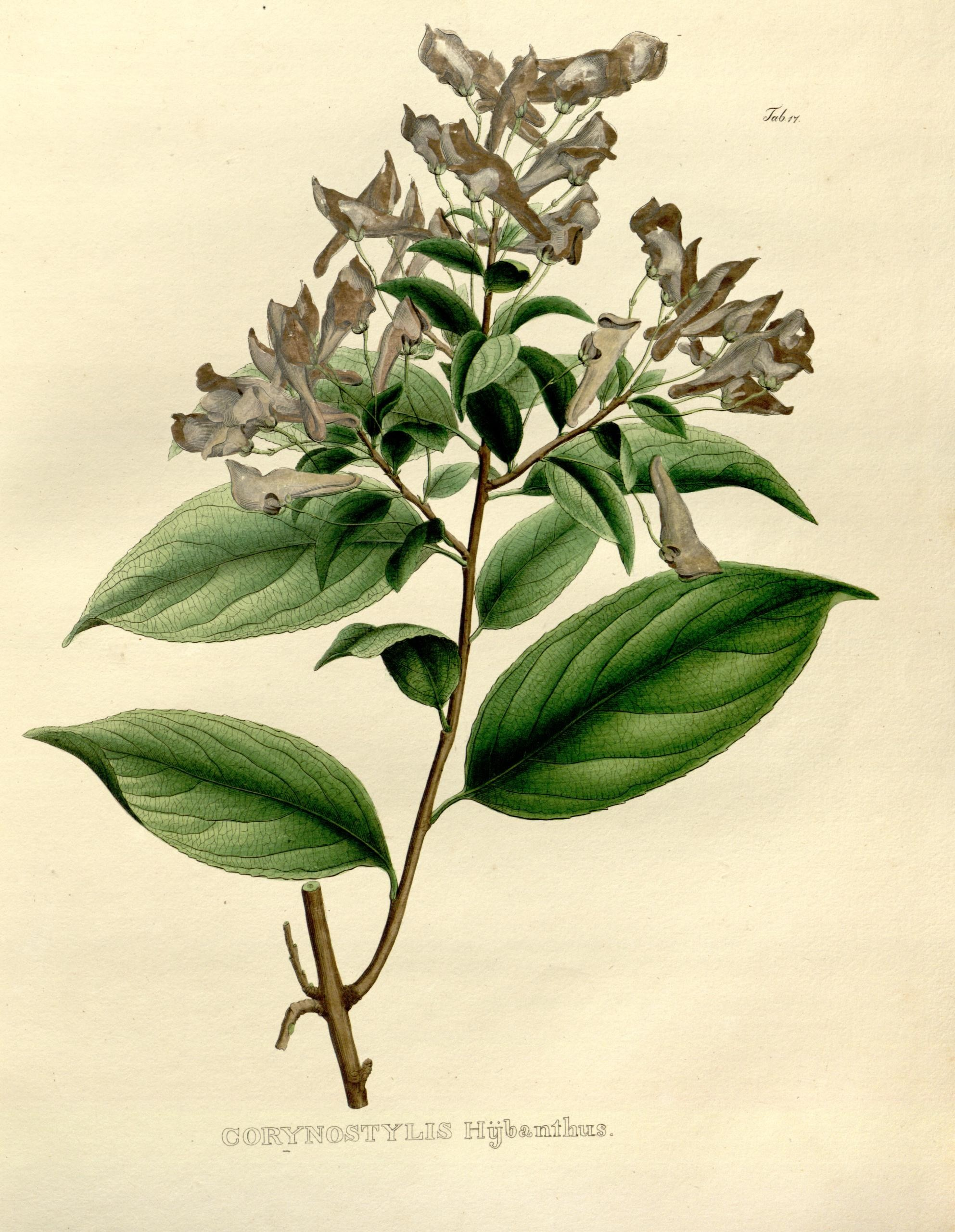

Scientific classification
- Kingdom: Plantae
- Clade: Tracheophytes
- Clade: Angiosperms
- Clade: Eudicots
- Clade: Rosids
- Order: Malpighiales
- Family: Violaceae
- Genus: Calyptrion
- Species: C. arboreum

Binomial name
- Calyptrion arboreum (L.) Paula-Souza

= Calyptrion arboreum =

Species of plant

Calyptrion arboreum is a species of plant in the family Violaceae. Its range is from South Mexico to South America. It is a scrambling shrub and grows primarily in the wet tropical biome, and is also used as medicine.
