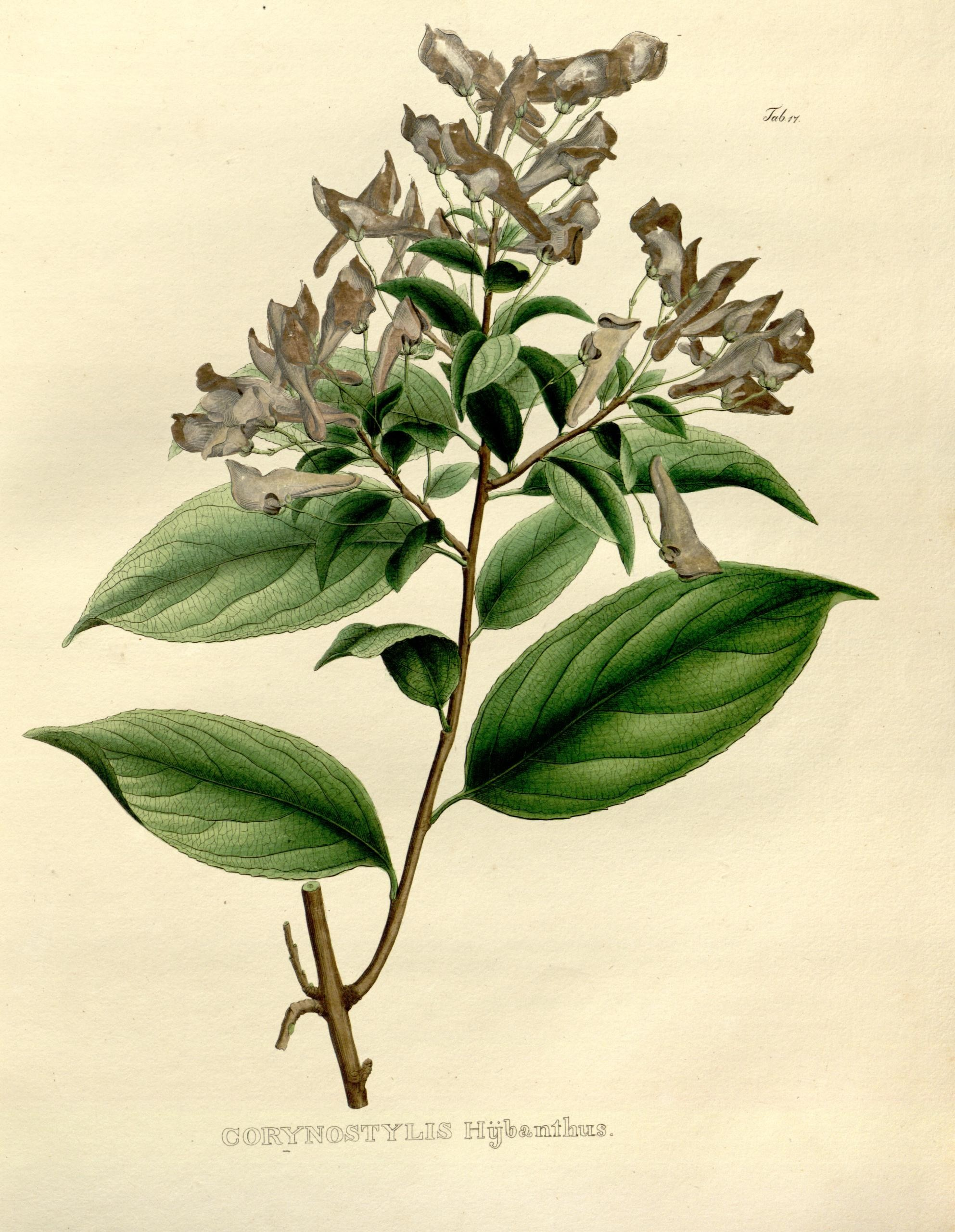
- Calyptrion arboreum

Scientific classification
- Kingdom: Plantae
- Clade: Tracheophytes
- Clade: Angiosperms
- Clade: Eudicots
- Clade: Rosids
- Order: Malpighiales
- Family: Violaceae
- Subfamily: Violoideae
- Tribe: Violeae
- Genus: Calyptrion; Ging.

Type species
- Calyptrion arboreum (L.) Paula-Souza

Species
- Calyptrion arboreum (L.) Paula-Souza; Calyptrion carthagenense (H.Karst.) Paula-Souza; Calyptrion pubescens (S.Moore) Paula-Souza; Calyptrion volubile (L.B.Sm. & A.Fernández) Paula-Souza

Synonyms
- List: Corynostylis Mart.

= Calyptrion =

Genus of flowering plants

Calyptrion is a genus of flowering plants in the violet family Violaceae, with four known species.

== Description ==
Lianas with oblong-lanceolate to ovate leaves. The flowers are situated in axillary or terminal racemes, rarely solitary, with white corollas, and are strongly zygomorphic (bilaterally symmetrical), the bottom petal being slightly longer than the others and more weakly differentiated, and with a very long spur. The stamens have free filaments, with the lowest two being calcarate (spurred) and possessing a large dorsal connective appendage that is entire and oblong-ovate. In the gynoecium, the style is filiform (threadlike). The fruit is a thick-walled capsule that is semi-dehiscent. There are numerous seeds per carpel, that are asymmetrically orbicular in outline and strongly flattened.

== Taxonomy ==
The genus Calyptrion was first described by Gingins in 1823, that he renamed from the preexisting Viola hybanthus described by Aublet in 1775, as a distinct new genus. This is now referred to as Calyptrion arboreum, and is therefore the type species. At that time it was the only known liana in the Violaceae. Gingins provided detailed descriptions of the Violaceae (then also known as Violarieae) in a number of subsequent texts, including the Prodromus of Candolle (1824), with eight species. At the same time, Martius described the genus as Corynostylis, and this name was erroneously used over the next 200 years, despite the earlier name, Gingins treating it as a synonym. The original name was restored in 2014.

Early taxonomic schemes such as Lindley (1846) and Bentham and Hooker (1862) placed Corynostylis/Calyptrion within subfamily Violoideae, tribe Violeae, subtribe Violinae.

Calyptrion is one of four lianescent genera in Violaceae, together with Agatea A.Gray, Anchietea A.St.-Hil. and Hybanthopsis Paula-Souza. In earlier classifications primarily based on floral morphology these were distributed among separate subtribes, but molecular phylogenetic studies has now grouped them together into a single lianescent clade, one of four within the family. Earlier schemes placed Corynostylis/Calyptrion within subfamily Violoideae, tribe Violeae, subtribe Violinae.

=== Etymology ===
The genus is named from the Greek words kalyptra, cover, and ion, violet.

=== Species ===
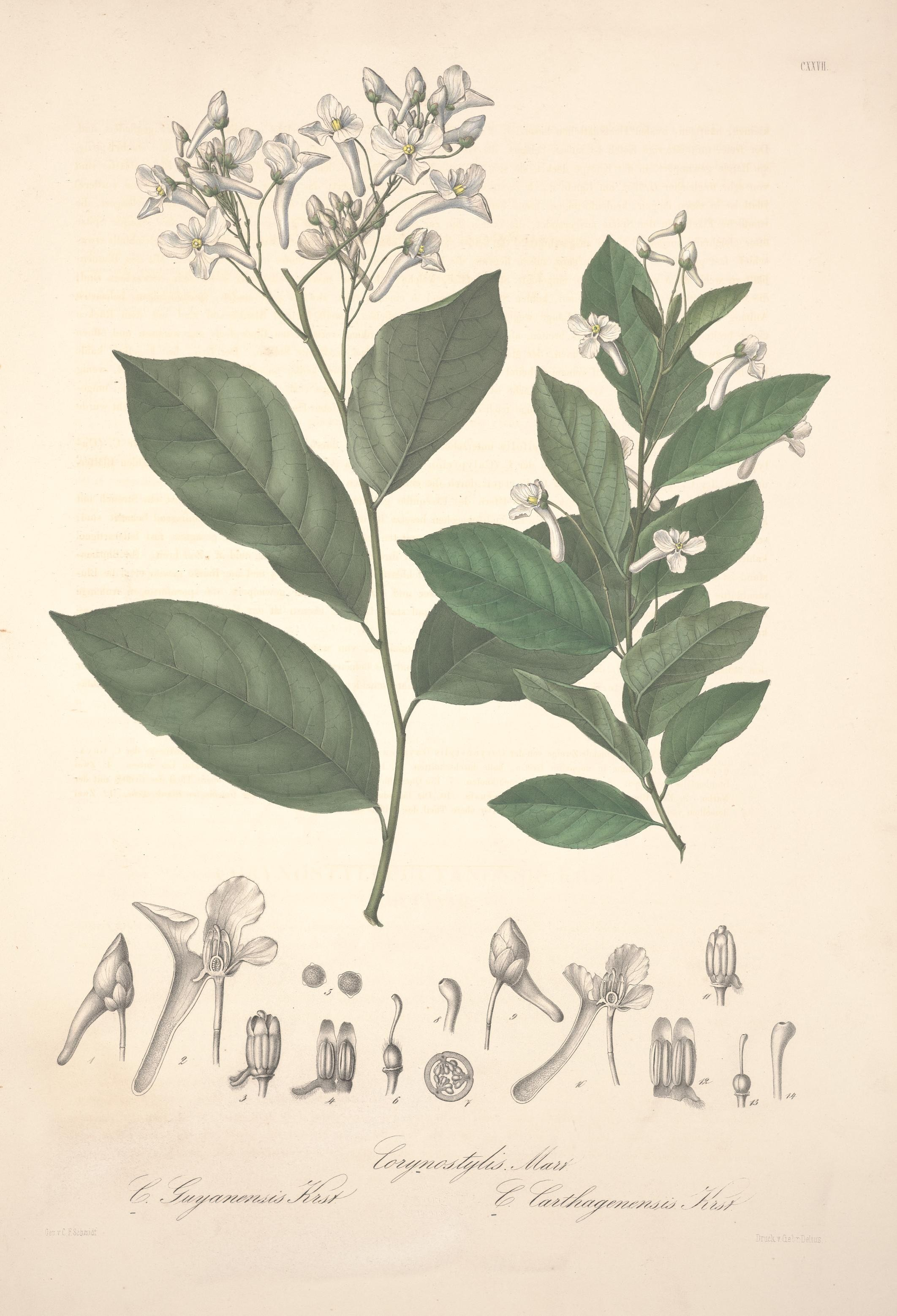
Plate CXXVII of Florae Columbiae illustrating Calyptrion arboreum (named as Corynostylis guayanensis) and Calyptrion carthagenense (named as Corynostylis carthagenensis).

There are four accepted species.

- Calyptrion arboreum (L.) Paula-Souza
- Calyptrion carthagenense (H.Karst.) Paula-Souza
- Calyptrion pubescens (S.Moore) Paula-Souza
- Calyptrion volubile (L.B.Sm. & A.Fernández) Paula-Souza

== Distribution and habitat ==
Calyptrion is native to the Amazon rainforest, although Calyptrion arboreum extends north up to Mexico. they are found along the margins of black water rivers.

== Bibliography ==
Books

- Ballard, Harvey E; Paula-Souza, Juliana de; Wahlert, Gregory A (2013). "Violaceae". In Kubitzki, Klaus (ed.). Flowering Plants. 11 Eudicots: Malpighiales. Springer Science & Business Media. pp. 303–322. ISBN 978-3-642-39417-1.(Also preview at Springer)
- Bentham, G.; Hooker, J.D. (1862). "Violarieae". Genera plantarum ad exemplaria imprimis in herbariis kewensibus servata definita (3 vols.). Vol. 1. London: L Reeve & Co. pp. 114–121.
- Byng, James W. (2014). "Violaceae". The Flowering Plants Handbook: A practical guide to families and genera of the world. Plant Gateway Ltd. pp. 238–239. ISBN 978-0-9929993-1-5.
- de Candolle, A. P. (1824–1873). "Calyptrion". Prodromus systematis naturalis regni vegetabilis, sive, Enumeratio contracta ordinum generum specierumque plantarum huc usque cognitarium, juxta methodi naturalis, normas digesta 17 vols. Vol. 1. Paris: Treuttel et Würtz. pp. 288–290.
- Christenhusz, Maarten J. M.; Fay, Michael F.; Chase, Mark W. (2017). "Violaceae". Plants of the World: An Illustrated Encyclopedia of Vascular Plants. University of Chicago Press. pp. 324–325. ISBN 978-0-226-52292-0.
- Lindley, John (1846). "Violaceae". The Vegetable Kingdom: or, The structure, classification, and uses of plants, illustrated upon the natural system (1st ed.). London: Bradbury. pp. 338–339.
- Martius, Karl Friedrich Philipp von (1824). "Corynostylis". Nova genera et species plantarum :quas in itinere per Brasiliam MDCCCXVII-MDCCCXX jussu et auspiciis Maximiliani Josephi I., Bavariae regis augustissimi instituto. 3 vols (in Latin). Vol. 1. Munich: Lindaueri. pp. 25–27.
- Paxton, Sir Joseph (1868) [1840]. "Calyptrion". A Pocket Botanical Dictionary, comprising the names, history, and culture of all plants known in Britain, with a full explanation of technical terms. By J. Paxton, assisted by Professor Lindley. Samuel Hereman (revision) (Revised ed.). p. 104.
- Quattrocchi, Umberto (2000). "Corynostylis arborea". CRC world dictionary of plant names: common names, scientific names, eponyms, synonyms, and etymology. 4 vols. Vol. 1. A-C. Boca Raton, FL: CRC Press. p. 1147. ISBN 0-8493-2673-7.

Articles

- Gingins, F de (1823). "Mémoires sur la Famille des Violacees". Mémoires de la Société de physique et d'histoire naturelle de Genève. 2 (1): 1–27.
- de Paula-Souza, Juliana; Pirani, José Rubens (22 December 2014). "Reestablishment of Calyptrion (Violaceae)". Taxon. 63 (6): 1335–1339. doi:10.12705/636.7.
- Wahlert, Gregory A.; Marcussen, Thomas; de Paula-Souza, Juliana; Feng, Min; Ballard, Harvey E. (1 March 2014). "A Phylogeny of the Violaceae (Malpighiales) Inferred from Plastid DNA Sequences: Implications for Generic Diversity and Intrafamilial Classification". Systematic Botany. 39 (1): 239–252. doi:10.1600/036364414X678008. S2CID 86452033.

Websites

- WFO (2019). "Calyptrion Ging". World Flora Online.
- POTWO. "Calyptrion Ging". Plants of the World Online. Royal Botanic Gardens, Kew.
- IPNI. "Calyptrion Ging., Mém. Soc. Phys. Genève 2(1): 28, t. 2, fig. 1 (1823)". Royal Botanic Gardens, Kew.
- "Calyptrion Ging". Tropicos. Missouri Botanical Garden. 2020.
