= Ixchelia uxpanapana =

Conservation status
- Vulnerable (IUCN 2.3)

Scientific classification
- Kingdom: Plantae
- Clade: Tracheophytes
- Clade: Angiosperms
- Clade: Eudicots
- Clade: Rosids
- Order: Malpighiales
- Family: Violaceae
- Genus: Ixchelia
- Species: I. uxpanapana

Binomial name
- Ixchelia uxpanapana (T.Wendt) Wahlert & H.E.Ballard (2015)

Synonyms
- Rinorea uxpanapana T.Wendt (1983 publ. 1984)

Species of flowering plant

Ixchelia uxpanapana is a species of plant in the family Violaceae. It is endemic to Mexico, and is native to the states of Oaxaca and Veracruz.

The species was first described as Rinorea uxpanapana by Thomas Leighton Wendt in 1983, and published in 1984. In 2015 it was placed in the new genus Ixchelia as Ixchelia uxpanapana.
