= Agatea lecointei =

Conservation status
- Critically endangered, possibly extinct (IUCN 3.1)

Scientific classification
- Kingdom: Plantae
- Clade: Embryophytes
- Clade: Tracheophytes
- Clade: Spermatophytes
- Clade: Angiosperms
- Clade: Eudicots
- Clade: Rosids
- Order: Malpighiales
- Family: Violaceae
- Genus: Agatea
- Species: A. lecointei

Binomial name
- Agatea lecointei Munzinger

Species of flowering plant

Agatea lecointei Is a species of flowering plant in the family Violaceae. It is endemic to New Caledonia.
