= Paypayrola longifolia =

Conservation status
- Least Concern (IUCN 3.1)

Scientific classification
- Kingdom: Plantae
- Clade: Tracheophytes
- Clade: Angiosperms
- Clade: Eudicots
- Clade: Rosids
- Order: Malpighiales
- Family: Violaceae
- Genus: Paypayrola
- Species: P. longifolia

Binomial name
- Paypayrola longifolia Tul.

Species of flowering plant

Paypayrola longifolia is a species of plant in the family Violaceae. Its range extends from Panama to Northern Brazil. It is a tree and grows in the wet tropical biome.
