= Orthion montanum =

Conservation status
- Endangered (IUCN 3.1)

Scientific classification
- Kingdom: Plantae
- Clade: Tracheophytes
- Clade: Angiosperms
- Clade: Eudicots
- Clade: Rosids
- Order: Malpighiales
- Family: Violaceae
- Genus: Orthion
- Species: O. montanum

Binomial name
- Orthion montanum Lundell

Species of plant

Orthion montanum is a species of plant in the family Violaceae It is endemic to Chiapas. It grows within wet tropical biomes.
