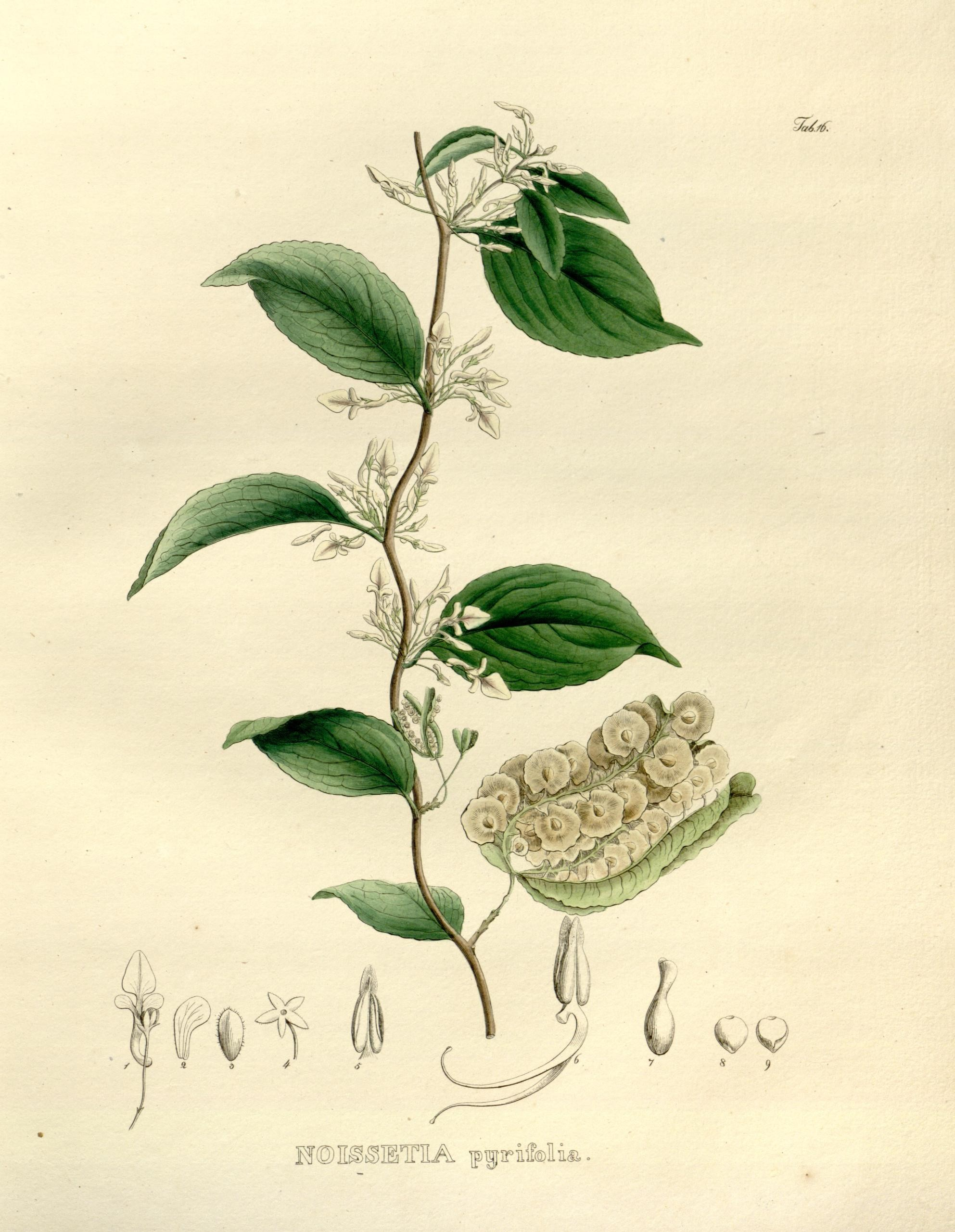

Scientific classification
- Kingdom: Plantae
- Clade: Tracheophytes
- Clade: Angiosperms
- Clade: Eudicots
- Clade: Rosids
- Order: Malpighiales
- Family: Violaceae
- Genus: Anchietea
- Species: A. pyrifolia

Binomial name
- Anchietea pyrifolia (Mart.) G.Don

= Anchietea pyrifolia =

Species of flowering plant

Anchietea pyrifolia is a species of plant in the family Violaceae. It is endemic to parts of South America. It is a climbing shrub and grows primarily in the seasonally dry tropical biome.
