= Amphirrhox grandifolia =

Scientific classification
- Kingdom: Plantae
- Clade: Tracheophytes
- Clade: Angiosperms
- Clade: Eudicots
- Clade: Rosids
- Order: Malpighiales
- Family: Violaceae
- Genus: Amphirrhox
- Species: A. grandifolia

Binomial name
- Amphirrhox grandifolia Melch., 1924

Species of plant

Amphirrhox grandifolia is a species of plant in the family Violaceae. It's native range is the Northeast Brazil region.
