= Gloeospermum boreale =

Conservation status
- Critically Endangered (IUCN 2.3)

Scientific classification
- Kingdom: Plantae
- Clade: Tracheophytes
- Clade: Angiosperms
- Clade: Eudicots
- Clade: Rosids
- Order: Malpighiales
- Family: Violaceae
- Genus: Gloeospermum
- Species: G. boreale

Binomial name
- Gloeospermum boreale C.V.Morton

Species of flowering plant

Gloeospermum boreale is a species of plant in the family Violaceae. It is endemic to the Honduras.
