= Anchietea ballardii =

Scientific classification
- Kingdom: Plantae
- Clade: Tracheophytes
- Clade: Angiosperms
- Clade: Eudicots
- Clade: Rosids
- Order: Malpighiales
- Family: Violaceae
- Genus: Anchietea
- Species: A. ballardii

Binomial name
- Anchietea ballardii Paula-Souza

Species of flowering plant

Anchietea ballardii is a species of plant in the family Violaceae. It is endemic to Espírito Santo.

It is described and illustrated in Phytotaxa.

Anchietea ballardii was named after Dr. Harvey Ballard, Associate Professor of Environmental & Plant Biology at Ohio University.
