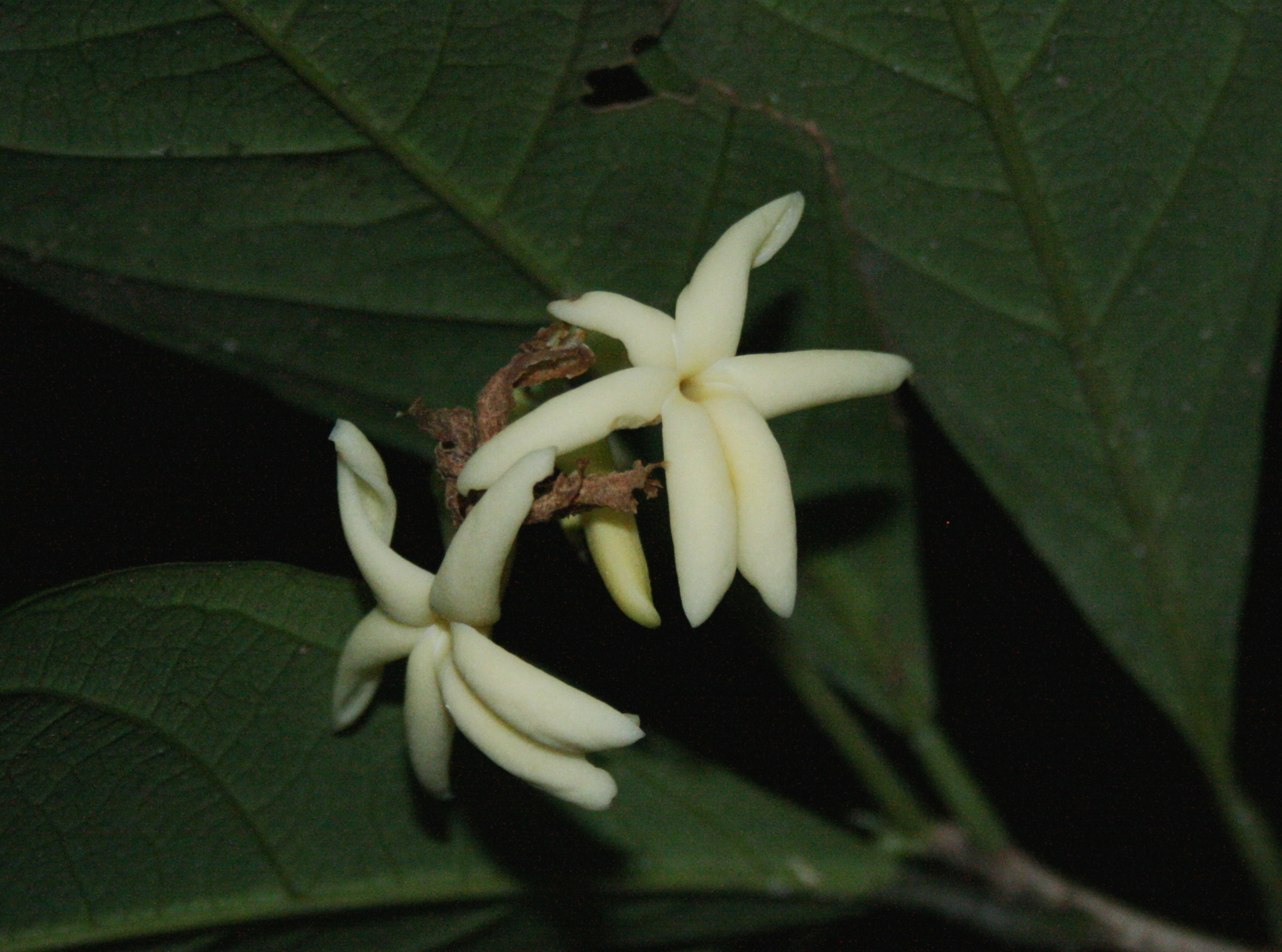

Conservation status
- Least Concern (IUCN 3.1)

Scientific classification
- Kingdom: Plantae
- Clade: Tracheophytes
- Clade: Angiosperms
- Clade: Eudicots
- Clade: Rosids
- Order: Malpighiales
- Family: Violaceae
- Genus: Amphirrhox
- Species: A. longifolia

Binomial name
- Amphirrhox longifolia (A.St.-Hil.) Spreng.

= Amphirrhox longifolia =

Species of plant

Amphirrhox longifolia is a species of plant in the family Violaceae. It is native to parts of South America. It is a tree and grows in the seasonally dry tropical biome.
