= Decorsella =

Scientific classification
- Kingdom: Plantae
- Clade: Tracheophytes
- Clade: Angiosperms
- Clade: Eudicots
- Clade: Rosids
- Order: Malpighiales
- Family: Violaceae
- Genus: Decorsella; A.Chev.

Synonyms
- Gymnorinorea Keay

Genus of plants

Decorsella is a genus of flowering plants belonging to the family Violaceae.

Its native range is western Central Tropical Africa. It is found in the countries of Cameroon, the Republic of the Congo, Gabon, Ghana, Ivory Coast and Liberia.

The genus name of Decorsella is in honour of Gaston-Jules Decorse (1873–1907), a French military doctor and botanist. It was first described and published in Mém. Soc. Bot. France Vol.8 on page 297 in 1917.

Known species:

- Decorsella arborea Jongkind
- Decorsella paradoxa A.Chev.
