= Fusispermum =

Scientific classification
- Kingdom: Plantae
- Clade: Tracheophytes
- Clade: Angiosperms
- Clade: Eudicots
- Clade: Rosids
- Order: Malpighiales
- Family: Violaceae
- Subfamily: Fusispermoideae; Hekking
- Genus: Fusispermum; Cuatrec.

Species
- See text

Genus of Violaceae plants

Fusispermum is a genus of flowering plants in the violet and pansy family Violaceae, native to Costa Rica, Panama, Columbia, Ecuador and Peru. It is basal to the other genera in Violaceae.

== Species ==
Species currently accepted by The Plant List are as follows:

- Fusispermum laxiflorum Hekking
- Fusispermum minutiflorum Cuatrec.
- Fusispermum rubrolignosum Cuatrec.
