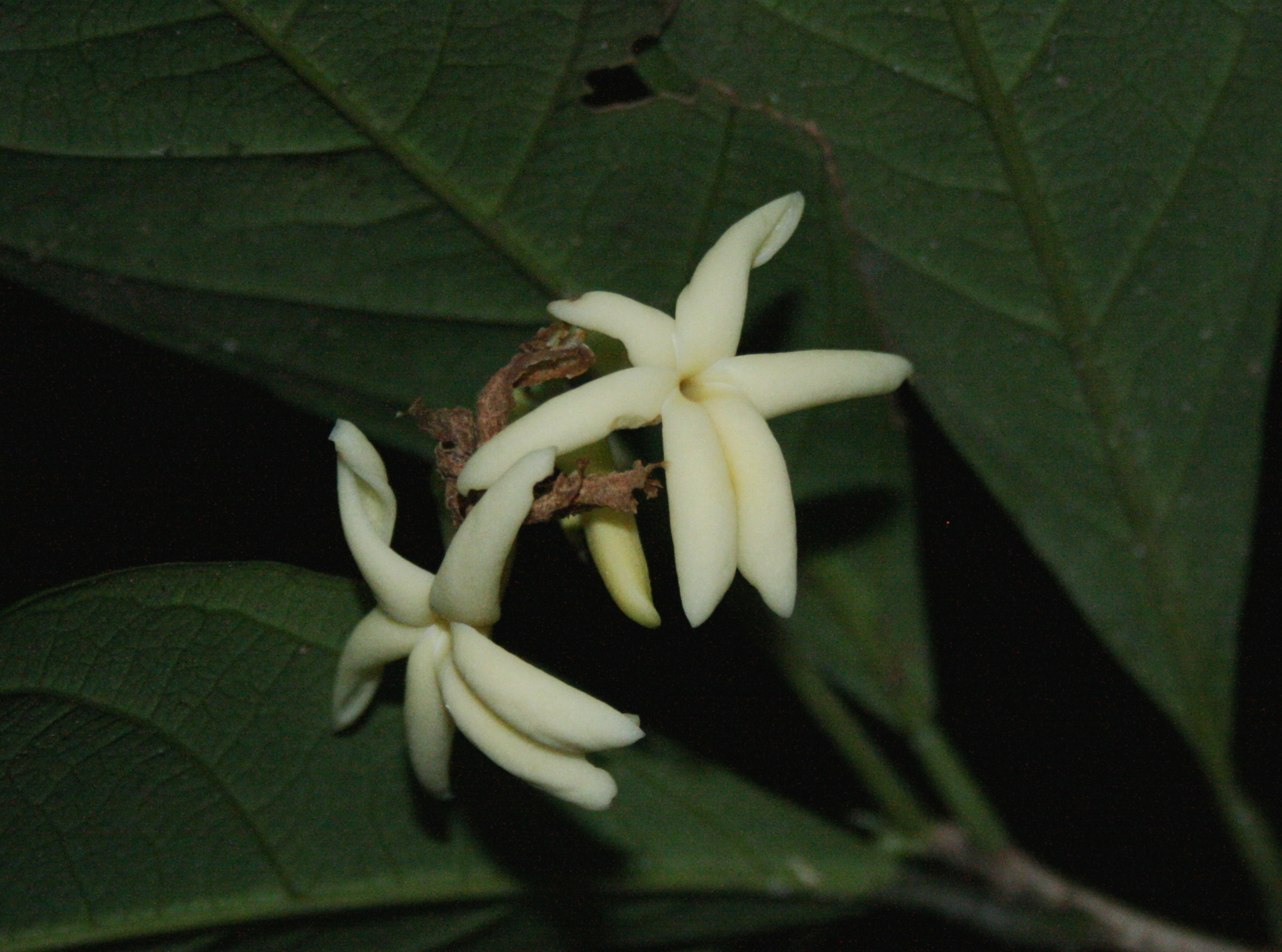
- Flowers of Amphirrhox longifolia

Scientific classification
- Kingdom: Plantae
- Clade: Embryophytes
- Clade: Tracheophytes
- Clade: Spermatophytes
- Clade: Angiosperms
- Clade: Eudicots
- Clade: Rosids
- Order: Malpighiales
- Family: Violaceae
- Genus: Amphirrhox; Spreng. (1827)

Synonyms
- Braddleya Vell. (1829); Bradleya Kuntze (1891); Spathularia A.St.-Hil. (1824), nom. illeg.

= Amphirrhox =

Genus of flowering plants

Amphirrhox is a genus of flowering plants belonging to the family Violaceae.

Its native range is Costa Rica to tropical South America as far as Bolivia and southern Brazil.

Two species are accepted.

- Amphirrhox grandifolia Melch.
- Amphirrhox longifolia (A.St.-Hil.) Spreng.
