= Leonia (plant) =

Scientific classification
- Kingdom: Plantae
- Clade: Embryophytes
- Clade: Tracheophytes
- Clade: Spermatophytes
- Clade: Angiosperms
- Clade: Eudicots
- Clade: Rosids
- Order: Malpighiales
- Family: Violaceae
- Subfamily: Leonioideae
- Genus: Leonia; Ruiz & Pav.

Species
- 23; see text

Synonyms
- List: Gloeospermum Triana & Planch.; Mayanaea Lundell; Rinoreocarpus Ducke; Steudelia Mart., nom. illeg.

Genus of flowering plants

Leonia is a genus of flowering plants in the family Violaceae. It includes 23 species of small trees or shrubs native to tropical Central and South America, ranging from Guatemala to Bolivia and central Brazil.

== Species ==
- Leonia andina (Tul.) Byng & Christenh.
- Leonia blakeana (Standl.) Byng & Christenh.
- Leonia borealis (C.V.Morton) Byng & Christenh.
- Leonia caudata (Lundell) Byng & Christenh.
- Leonia crassa L.B.Sm. & A.Fernández
- Leonia crassicarpa (W.Palacios) Byng & Christenh.
- Leonia cymosa Mart.
- Leonia dichotoma (Rusby) Byng & Christenh.
- Leonia equatoriensis (Hekking) Byng & Christenh.
- Leonia falcata (Hekking) Byng & Christenh.
- Leonia glycycarpa Ruiz & Pav.
- Leonia gossypium (Tul.) Byng & Christenh.
- Leonia grandifolia (Hekking) Byng & Christenh.
- Leonia longifolia (Hekking) Byng & Christenh.
- Leonia martii (Eichler) Byng & Christenh.
- Leonia occidentalis Cuatrec.
- Leonia pauciflora (Hekking) Byng & Christenh.
- Leonia pilosa (Melch.) Byng & Christenh.
- Leonia portobelensis (A.Robyns) Byng & Christenh.
- Leonia sclerophylla (Cuatrec.) Byng & Christenh.
- Leonia sphaerocarpa (Triana & Planch.) Byng & Christenh.
- Leonia triandra Cuatrec.
- Leonia ulei (Melch.) Byng & Christenh.
