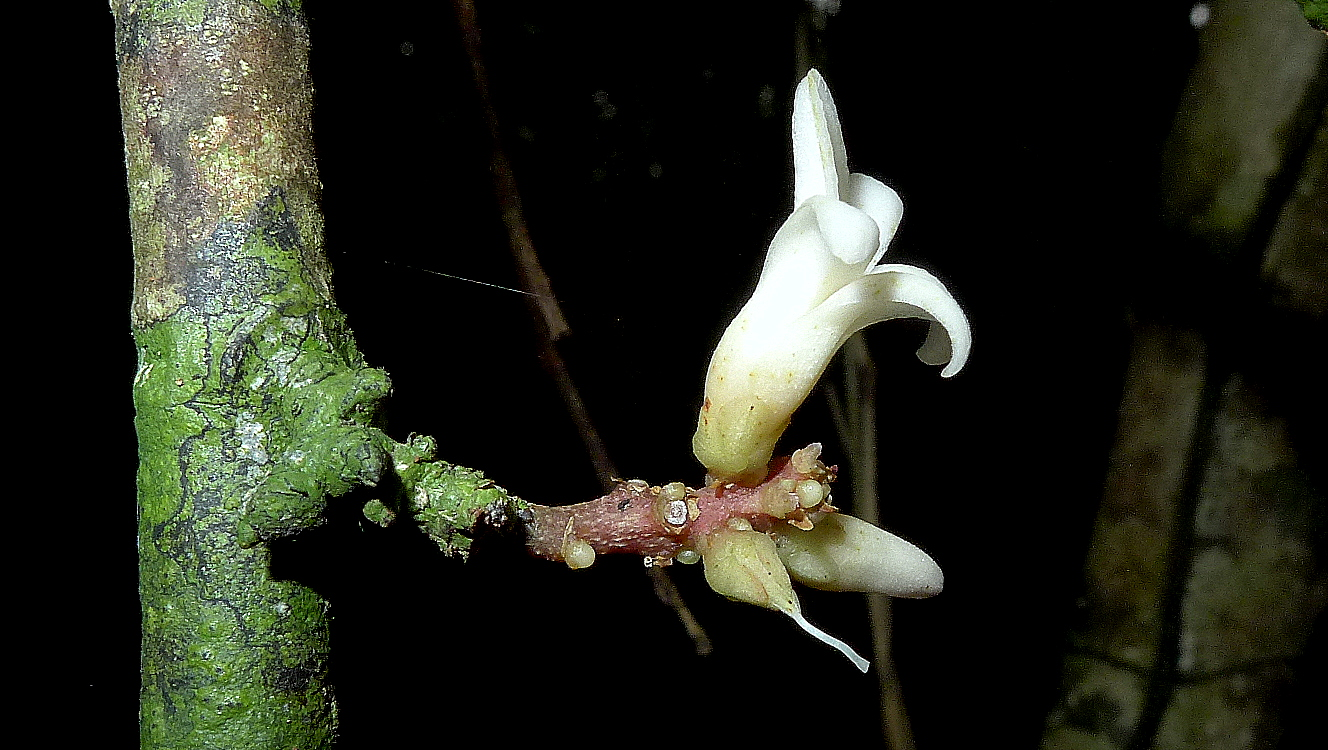
- Paypayrola blanchetiana

Scientific classification
- Kingdom: Plantae
- Clade: Tracheophytes
- Clade: Angiosperms
- Clade: Eudicots
- Clade: Rosids
- Order: Malpighiales
- Family: Violaceae
- Genus: Paypayrola; Aubl. (1775)

Synonyms
- Hekkingia H.E.Ballard & Munzinger (2003); Lignonia Scop. (1777); Payrola Juss. (1789), nom. superfl.; Periclistia Benth. (1841); Wibelia Pers. (1805), nom. illeg.

= Paypayrola =

Genus of plants

Paypayrola is a genus of flowering plants belonging to the family Violaceae.

Its native range is Central and Southern Tropical America.

Nine species are accepted.

- Paypayrola arenacea Aymard & G.A.Romero
- Paypayrola blanchetiana Tul.
- Paypayrola bordenavei (H.E.Ballard & Munzinger) Byng & Christenh.
- Paypayrola confertiflora Tul.
- Paypayrola grandiflora Tul.
- Paypayrola guianensis Aubl.
- Paypayrola hulkiana Pulle
- Paypayrola longifolia Tul.
- Paypayrola panamensis H.E.Ballard
