= Violales =

Order of eudicot flowering plants

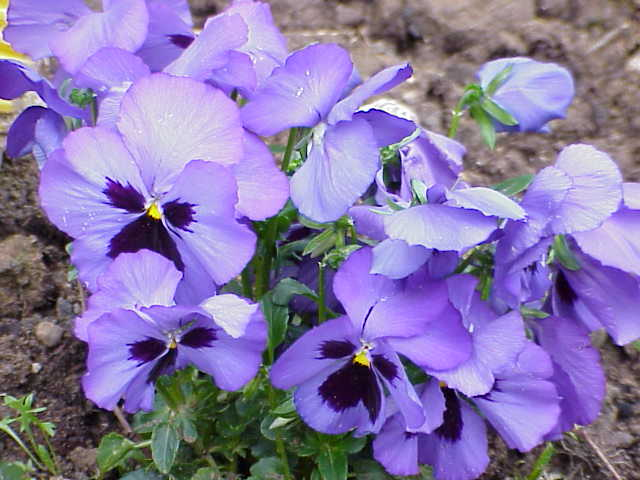
Viola tricolor

Violales is a botanical name of an order of flowering plants and takes its name from the included family Violaceae; it was proposed by Lindley (1853). The name has been used in several systems, although some systems used the name Parietales for similar groupings. In the 1981 version of the influential Cronquist system, order Violales was placed in subclass Dilleniidae with a circumscription consisting of the families listed below. Some classifications such as that of Dahlgren placed the Violales in the superorder Violiflorae (also called Violanae).

The Angiosperm Phylogeny Group (APG) system does not recognize order Violales; Violaceae is placed in order Malpighiales and the other families are reassigned to various orders as indicated.

- order Violales Perleb 1826
  family Achariaceae → order Malpighiales
  family Ancistrocladaceae → order Caryophyllales
  family Begoniaceae → order Cucurbitales
  family Bixaceae → order Malvales
  family Caricaceae → order Brassicales
  family Cistaceae → order Malvales
  family Cucurbitaceae → order Cucurbitales
  family Datiscaceae → order Cucurbitales
  family Dioncophyllaceae → order Caryophyllales
  family Flacourtiaceae → included in family Salicaceae, in order Malpighiales
  family Fouquieriaceae → order Ericales
  family Frankeniaceae → order Caryophyllales
  family Hoplestigmataceae → uncertain position
  family Huaceae → eurosids I (direct placement)
  family Lacistemataceae → order Malpighiales
  family Loasaceae → order Cornales
  family Malesherbiaceae → order Malpighiales (optionally inside Passifloraceae)
  family Passifloraceae → order Malpighiales
  family Peridiscaceae → order Saxifragales
  family Scyphostegiaceae → included in family Salicaceae, in order Malpighiales
  family Stachyuraceae → order Crossosomatales
  family Tamaricaceae → order Caryophyllales
  family Turneraceae → order Malpighiales (optionally inside Passifloraceae)
  family Violaceae → order Malpighiales

== Bibliography ==
- Cronquist, A (1981). An integrated system of classification of flowering plants. New York: Columbia University Press. ISBN 9780231038805.
- Dahlgren, R. M. T. (February 1980). "A revised system of classification of the angiosperms". Botanical Journal of the Linnean Society. 80 (2): 91–124. doi:10.1111/j.1095-8339.1980.tb01661.x.
- Lindley, John (1853) [1846]. "Violales". The Vegetable Kingdom: or, The structure, classification, and uses of plants, illustrated upon the natural system (3rd. ed.). London: Bradbury & Evans. pp. 326−347.
- Sharma, O. P. (2009) [1993]. "Violales". Plant Taxonomy (2nd ed.). Tata McGraw-Hill Education. pp. 43, 172, 249. ISBN 978-1-259-08137-8.
- Angiosperm Phylogeny Group IV (2016). "An update of the Angiosperm Phylogeny Group classification for the orders and families of flowering plants: APG IV". Botanical Journal of the Linnean Society. 181 (1): 1–20. doi:10.1111/boj.12385.
- Reveal, James L (27 January 1999). "pbio 450 Lecture Notes: Syllabus Spring 1999 Advanced Plant Taxonomy. Violales Perleb, 1826". Plant systematics. University of Maryland: Norton-Brown Herbarium.
