= Gwilym Peter Lewis =

British botanist

Gwilym Peter Lewis (born 1952) is a British botanist, a curator at the Royal Botanic Gardens, Kew, and a leading expert on neotropical Leguminosae. The standard author abbreviation G.P.Lewis is used to indicate this person as the author when citing a botanical name.

== Education and career ==
Lewis graduated in 1973 with a B.Sc. from the University of London. He eventually became the head of the legume section at the Royal Botanic Gardens, Kew, which he joined in 1974. In his research on the legume family he has contributed to the description of 58 species and 11 genera. He has also contributed to several taxonomic revisions, especially for the genus Caesalpinia. In 1994 he received a Ph.D. from the University of St. Andrews. His doctoral dissertation, supervised by Peter Edward Gibbs, is entitled Systematic studies in neotropical 'Caesalpinia L.' (Leguminosae: Caesalpinioideae), including a revision of the 'Poincianella-Erythrostemon group' .

Lewis has collected thousands of botanical specimens and has done botanical "fieldwork in Brazil, Cuba, Argentina, Ecuador, Central America, Mexico and Madagascar". He has been a plant co-collector with over twenty different botanists. During his career at the Royal Botanic Gardens, Kew, his research has focused on "systematics, phylogenetics, biogeography, diversity and comparative biology of neotropical (mainly South American) Leguminosae, especially Caesalpinioideae (particularly Caesalpinia) and Mimosoideae. Floristic studies focus on the drylands and wet tropics of Brazil and the Andes of Ecuador, including monographic work on the large genus Caesalpinia."

His numerous scientific articles (over 250 as author or co-author) have been published in leading journals such as Brittonia, Curtis's Botanical Magazine and Kew Bulletin. The book Legumes of the World, of which he is the lead author, has been awarded the 2006 Annual Literature Award in the Technical Category from the Council on Botanical and Horticultural Libraries.

In 1995 Lewis received the Rupert Barneby Award from the New York Botanical Garden to enable him, as a visiting researcher for the year 1996, to do research on the legume family of Ecuador. He is a member of the American Society of Plant Taxonomists, the Botanical Society of America and the Organization for Flora Neotropica.

== Selected publications ==
=== Articles ===
- Santos Guerra, A.; Lewis, G. P. (1986). "A New Species of Cicer (Leguminosae: Papilionoideae) from the Canary Islands". Kew Bulletin. 41 (2): 459–462. doi:10.2307/4102961. JSTOR 4102961.
- Simpson, B. B.; Lewis, G. P. (2003). "New Combinations in Pomaria (Caesalpinioideae: Leguminosae)". Kew Bulletin. 58 (1): 175–184. doi:10.2307/4119360. JSTOR 4119360.
- Lavin, Matt; Schrire, Brian P.; Lewis, Gwilym; Pennington, R. Toby; Delgado-Salinas, Alfonso; Thulin, Mats; Hughes, Colin E.; Beyra Matos, Angela; Wojciechowski, Martin F. (2004). "Metacommunity process rather than continental tectonic history better explains geographically structured phylogenies in legumes". Philosophical Transactions of the Royal Society of London, Series B. 359 (1450): 1509–22. doi:10.1098/rstb.2004.1536. PMC 1693434. PMID 15519969.
- Mansano, Vidal de Freitas; Tozzi, Ana Maria Goulart de Azevedo; Lewis, Gwilym P. (2004). "A Revision of the South American Genus Zollernia Wied-Neuw. & Nees (Leguminosae, Papilionoideae, Swartzieae)". Kew Bulletin. 59 (4): 497–520. doi:10.2307/4110905. JSTOR 4110905.
- Schrire, B. D.; Lavin, M.; Lewis, G. P. (2005). "Global distribution patterns of the Leguminosae: insights from recent phylogenies". In Friis. Ib; Balslev, Hendrik (eds.). Plant Diversity and Complexity Patterns: Local, Regional, and Global Dimensions : Proceedings of an International Symposium Held at the Royal Danish Academy of Sciences and Letters in Copenhagen, Denmark, 25-28 May, 2003. Biologiske skrifter, 55, Kongelige Danske videnskabernes selskab. Kgl. Danske Videnskabernes Selskab. pp. 375–422. ISBN 978-87-7304-304-2.
- de Queiroz, Luciano Paganucci; Lewis, Gwilym P.; Wojciechowski, Martin F. (2010). "Tabaroa, a new genus of Leguminosae tribe Brongniartieae from Brazil". Kew Bulletin. 65 (2): 189–203. doi:10.1007/s12225-010-9202-7. ISSN 0075-5974. S2CID 36238640.
- Lewis, G. P.; Wood, J. R. I.; Lavin, M. (2012). "Steinbachiella (Leguminosae: Papilionoideae: Dalbergieae), endemic to Bolivia, is reinstated as an accepted genus". Kew Bulletin. 67 (4): 789–796. doi:10.1007/s12225-012-9415-z. S2CID 10964925.
- Savassi-Coutinho, A. P.; Lewis, G. P.; Souza, V. C. (2012). "Mimosa roseoalba (Leguminosae: Mimosoideae), a new species from Mato Grosso do Sul, Brazil". Kew Bulletin. 67 (4): 827–831. doi:10.1007/s12225-012-9417-x. ISSN 0075-5974. S2CID 21957659.
- Gagnon, Edeline; Ringelberg, Jens J.; Bruneau, Anne; Lewis, Gwilym P.; Hughes, Colin E. (2019). "Global Succulent Biome phylogenetic conservatism across the pantropical Caesalpinia Group (Leguminosae)". New Phytologist. 222 (4): 1994–2008. doi:10.1111/nph.15633. PMID 30536385. S2CID 54477622.

=== Books ===
- Lewis, G. P. (1987). Legumes of Bahia. Kew Publishing. ISBN 0947643052.
- Lewis, Gwilym (1989). Postcards from Kew. London: HMSO. ISBN 0112500374.
- Lewis, G. P. (1998). Caesalpinia: A Revision of the Poincianella-Erythrostemon Group. Royal Botanic Gardens, Kew. ISBN 1900347326.
- Lewis, Gwilym; Schrire, Brian; Mackinder, Barbara; Lock, Mike (2005). Legumes of the World. Royal Botanic Gardens, Kew. ISBN 1900347806.
- César, Edgley A.; Juchum, Fabricio S.; Lewis, Gwilym P. (2006). Preliminary List of the Leguminosae in Northeastern Brazil. Kew Publishing. ISBN 1842461427.
- Pennington, R. Toby; Lewis, Gwilym; Ratter, James A., eds. (2006). Neotropical Savannas and Seasonally Dry Forests. CRC Press. ISBN 0849329876.
