= Ixchelia =

Scientific classification
- Kingdom: Plantae
- Clade: Tracheophytes
- Clade: Angiosperms
- Clade: Eudicots
- Clade: Rosids
- Order: Malpighiales
- Family: Violaceae
- Genus: Ixchelia; H.E.Ballard & Wahlert (2015)

Species
- Ixchelia kochii Cuevas; Ixchelia mexicana (Ging. ex DC.) H.E.Ballard & Wahlert; Ixchelia uxpanapana (T.Wendt) Wahlert & H.E.Ballard

Genus of flowering plants

Ixchelia is a genus of flowering plants in the violet family, Violaceae. It includes three species native to Mexico and Central America.

- Ixchelia kochii Cuevas – Jalisco in southwestern Mexico
- Ixchelia mexicana (Ging. ex DC.) H.E.Ballard & Wahlert – Mexico, Honduras, Nicaragua, and Costa Rica
- Ixchelia uxpanapana (T.Wendt) Wahlert & H.E.Ballard – Veracruz and Oaxaca in Mexico
