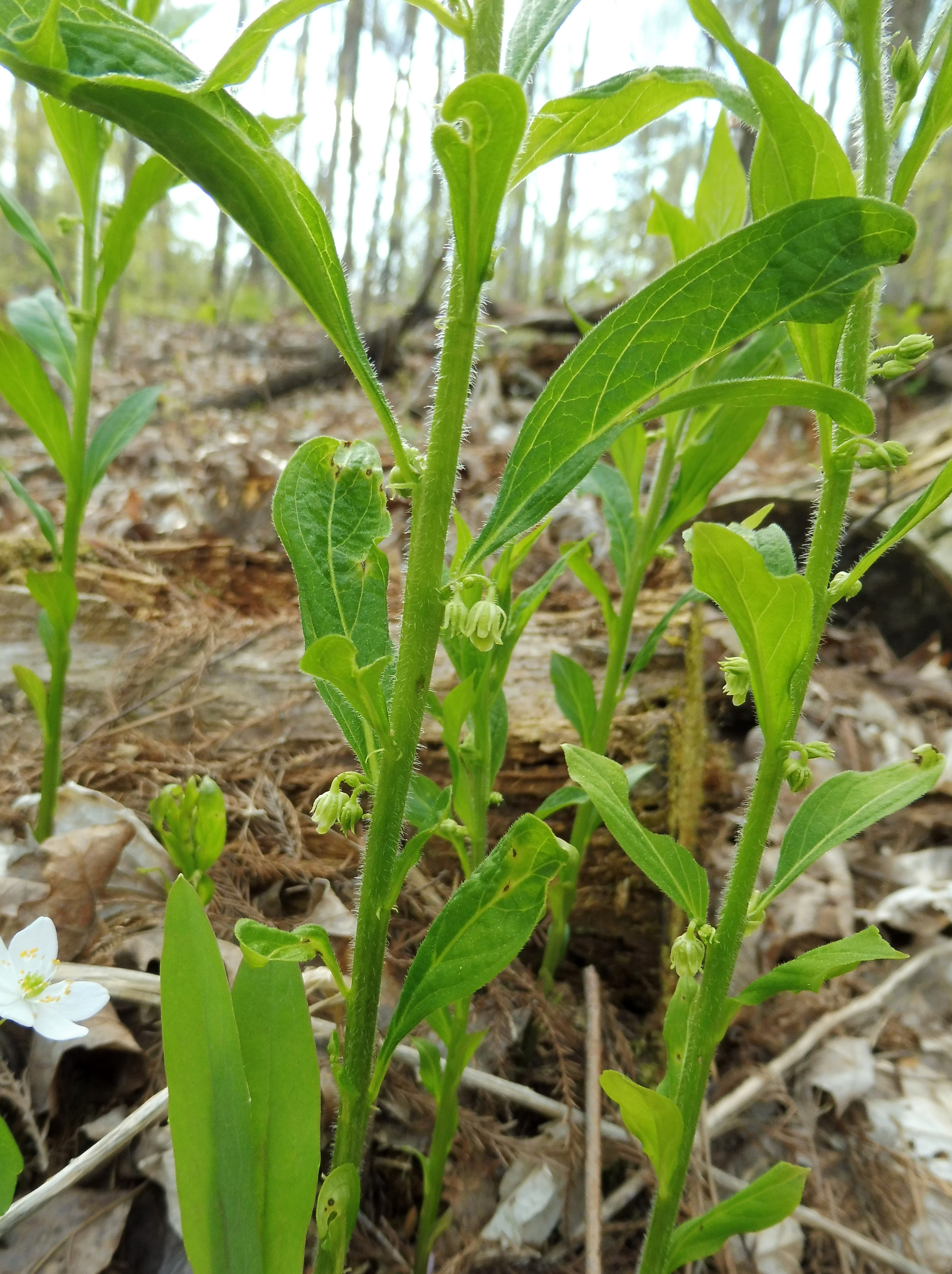

Conservation status
- Secure (NatureServe)

Scientific classification
- Kingdom: Plantae
- Clade: Tracheophytes
- Clade: Angiosperms
- Clade: Eudicots
- Clade: Rosids
- Order: Malpighiales
- Family: Violaceae
- Genus: Cubelium; Raf. ex Britton & A.Br. (1897)
- Species: C. concolor

Binomial name
- Cubelium concolor (T.F.Forst.) Raf. ex Britton & A.Br. (1897)

Synonyms
- List: Calceolaria concolor (T.F.Forst.) Kuntze (1891); Cubelium concolor f. subglabrum Eames (1930); Hybanthus concolor (T.F.Forst.) Spreng. (1824); Ionidium concolor (T.F.Forst.) Benth. & Hook.f. ex S.Watson (1878); Ionidium sprengelianum Schult. (1819); Noisettia acuminata Ging. (1824); Solea concolor (T.F.Forst.) Ging. (1824); Solea stricta Spreng. (1813); Viola concolor T.F.Forst. (1802); Viola sprengeliana Steud. (1821), not validly publ.; Viola stricta Muhl. ex Pursh (1813), pro syn.

= Cubelium =

Species of flowering plant

Cubelium concolor (synonym Hybanthus concolor), commonly known as eastern green violet, is a flowering plant in the violet family (Violaceae). It is native to eastern North America, where it ranges from Ontario south to Florida, and from Vermont west to Kansas and Oklahoma.

== Description ==
Green violet is a shrub-like herb that grows to a height of 30 cm to 1 m. Its inconspicuous flowers are small, close to the stem, and green. It blooms from May to June in Ontario and from April to June in Connecticut.

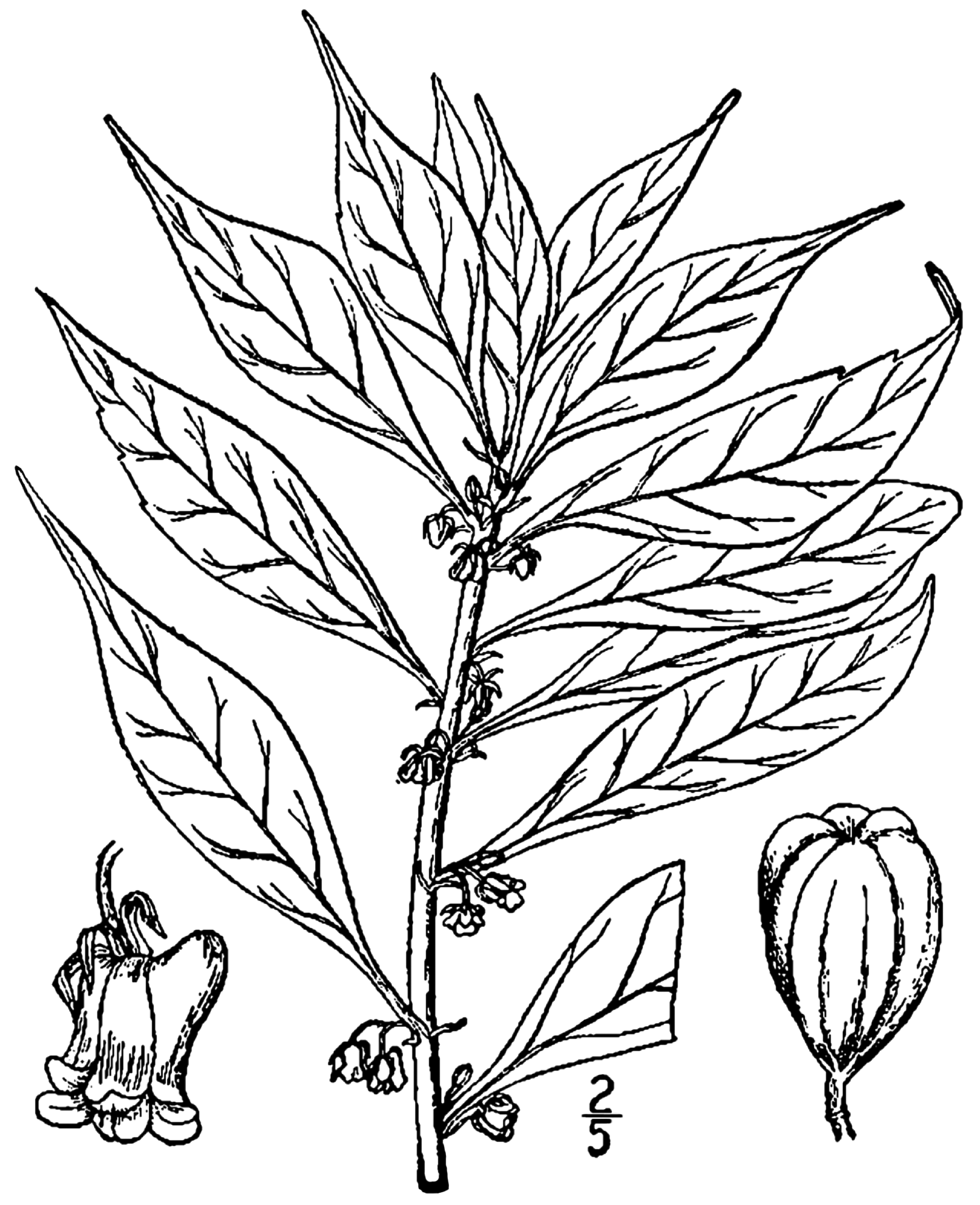
Botanical illustration of Hybanthus concolor

== Habitat ==
The natural habitat of Cubelium concolor is in nutrient rich, calcareous forests and woodlands, typically in mesic or bottomland conditions. It is found less frequently in dry forests and glades. It is a fairly conservative species, and is only found in areas with an intact native herbaceous layer.

Most of the Canadian populations are located along the Niagara Escarpment, a prime habitat for green violet.
