= Scyphellandra =

Scientific classification
- Kingdom: Plantae
- Clade: Tracheophytes
- Clade: Angiosperms
- Clade: Eudicots
- Clade: Rosids
- Order: Malpighiales
- Family: Violaceae
- Genus: Scyphellandra; Thwaites (1858)
- Species: S. virgata

Binomial name
- Scyphellandra virgata Thwaites (1858)

Synonyms
- Alsodeia minutiflora Ridl. (1911); Alsodeia virgata Thwaites ex Hook.f. & Thomson (1872), not validly publ.; Rinorea pierrei (Boissieu) Melch. (1925); Rinorea virgata (Thwaites) Kuntze (1891); Scyphellandra pierrei Boissieu (1908); Scyphellandra poilanei Gagnep. (1939), no Latin descr.

Genus of flowering plants

Scyphellandra virgata is a species of flowering plant in the violet family, Violaceae. It is the sole species in genus Scyphellandra. It is a shrub native to Indochina, Hainan, Peninsular Malaysia, and Sri Lanka.
