= Gloeospermum =

Scientific classification
- Kingdom: Plantae
- Clade: Tracheophytes
- Clade: Angiosperms
- Clade: Eudicots
- Clade: Rosids
- Order: Malpighiales
- Family: Violaceae
- Subfamily: Violoideae
- Tribe: Rinoreeae
- Subtribe: Rinoreinae
- Genus: Gloeospermum; Triana & Planch.

Genus of flowering plants

Gloeospermum is a plant genus in the Violaceae family. It has been found in Central American, including Panama, and Ecuador.

Species include:

- Gloeospermum boreale C.V.Morton
- Gloeospermum crassicarpum
- Gloeospermum diversipetalum
