= Orthion =

Scientific classification
- Kingdom: Plantae
- Clade: Tracheophytes
- Clade: Angiosperms
- Clade: Eudicots
- Clade: Rosids
- Order: Malpighiales
- Family: Violaceae
- Genus: Orthion; Standl. & Steyerm.

Genus of plants

Orthion is a genus of flowering plants belonging to the family Violaceae.

Its native range is Southern Mexico to Colombia.

Species:

- Orthion guatemalense Lundell
- Orthion malpighiifolium (Standl.) Standl. & Steyerm.
- Orthion montanum Lundell
- Orthion oblanceolatum Lundell
- Orthion subsessile (Standl.) Standl. & Steyerm.
- Orthion veracruzense Lundell
