= Parietales =

Historical order of dicotyledous flowering plants

Parietales is an order of flowering plants. It is a descriptive botanical name for placentae parietales (parietal placentation) that characterised those plants. Thus it could be used even today (for a taxon above the rank of family). The termination -ales is only coincidentally identical to that appropriate to the rank of order.

The name was used in several systems, such as (Bentham and Hooker, Engler and Prantl, Melchior), and Wettstein, etc. although more recent systems such as the Cronquist system preferred the name Violales. It persists as the parietal clade of Malpighiales.

== Bibliography ==
- Sharma, O. P. (2009) [1993]. "Violales". Plant Taxonomy (2nd ed.). Tata McGraw-Hill Education. pp. 43, 172, 249. ISBN 978-1-259-08137-8.
- Endress, Peter K.; Davis, Charles C.; Matthews, Merran L. (May 2013). "Advances in the floral structural characterization of the major subclades of Malpighiales, one of the largest orders of flowering plants". Annals of Botany. 111 (5): 969–985. doi:10.1093/aob/mct056. PMC 3631340. PMID 23486341.
