= Brittonia (journal) =

- Discipline: Systematic botany
- Language: English; Spanish
- Edited by: Gregory M. Plunkett

Publication details
- History: 1931–present
- Publisher: New York Botanical Garden Press (United States)
- Frequency: Quarterly since 1957 (vol. 9) sporadically 1931–1956 (vols. 1–8)

Standard abbreviations
- ISO 4: Brittonia

Indexing
- ISSN: 0007-196X (print); 1938-436X (web)
- JSTOR: brittonia
- OCLC no.: 1537395

Links
- Journal homepage

Brittonia is a quarterly, peer-reviewed botanical journal, publishing articles on plants, fungi, algae, and lichens. Published since 1931, it is named after the botanist Nathaniel Lord Britton. Since 2007, the journal has been published by Springer on behalf of the New York Botanical Garden Press, the New York Botanical Garden's publishing program. The current subtitle is: "A Journal of Systematic Botany". Currently, the journal is published quarterly, in both a paper and an online version. The editor-in-chief is Benjamin M. Torke.

The journal publishes research articles covering the entire field of the systematics of botany including anatomy, botanical history, chemotaxonomy, ecology, morphology, paleobotany, phylogeny, taxonomy and phytogeography. Each issue features articles by New York Botanical Garden staff members and by botanists on a worldwide basis. The journal also contains book reviews and announcements.

Scientists who have published in the journal include Frank Almeda, Arne Anderberg, Fred Rogers Barrie, Dennis Eugene Breedlove, Brian Boom, Sherwin Carlquist, Armando Carlos Cervi, Alain Chautems, Thomas Bernard Croat, Arthur Cronquist, Thomas Franklin Daniel, Otto Degener, Laurence Dorr, Robert Louis Dressler, Lynn Gillespie, Peter Goldblatt, Jean-Jacques de Granville, Walter Stephen Judd, Ellsworth Paine Killip, Robert Merrill King, Gwilym Lewis, Bassett Maguire, Lucinda McDade, John McNeill, Elmer Drew Merrill, Scott Alan Mori, José Panero, Timothy Plowman, Ghillean Prance, Peter Raven, Harold E. Robinson, Laurence Skog, Erik Smets, Douglas Soltis, Pamela Soltis, Julian Alfred Steyermark, Fabio Augusto Vitta, Warren L. Wagner, Dieter Wasshausen, Maximilian Weigend, Henk van der Werff and Scott Zona.

== List of editors ==
- Gregory M. Plunkett, 2022–present
- Benjamin M. Torke, 2016–2022
- Lawrence M. Kelly, 2004–2015
- Jacquelyn A. Kallunki, 1991–1994
- Noel H. Holmgren, 1977–1990
- John T. Mickel, 1976–1977
- William Louis Culberson, 1975
- Paul A. Fryxell, 1972–1975
- John R. Reeder, 1967–1971
- Peter H. Raven, 1963–1964
- Rogers McVaugh, 1959–1963
- Harold William Rickett, 1957–1958
- various editorial committees, 1931–1956
