= Frédéric Charles Jean Gingins de la Sarraz =

Swiss historian and botanist (1790–1863)

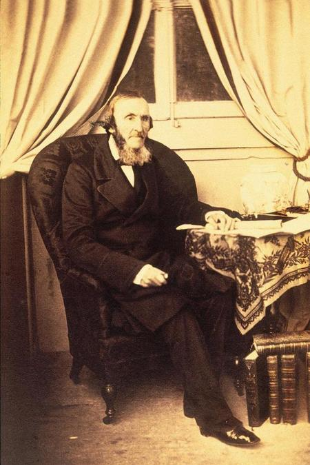
- Gingins in 1860
- Born: 14 August 1790; Éclépens, Switzerland
- Died: 27 February 1863 (aged 72); Lausanne, Switzerland
- Occupations: historian and botanist
- Known for: founder, Société d'histoire de la Suisse romande
- Notable work: First and Second Kingdoms of Burgundy

Frédéric Charles Jean Gingins de la Sarraz (14 August 1790 – 27 February 1863) was a Swiss historian and botanist.

Gingins was born 14 August 1790 in Éclépens. From 1817 to 1828 he worked as a translator of the French language in the State Chancellery at Bern. In 1844 he received an honorary doctorate from the University of Bern and in 1854 was awarded an honorary professorship at the Academy of Lausanne.

As a historian, he published numerous works from 1833 up until his death in 1863, most notably writings associated with the First and Second Kingdoms of Burgundy. In 1837 he was a founding member of the Société d'histoire de la Suisse romande, and from 1840 was a full member of the Académie des sciences, belles-lettres et arts de Savoie.

In 1823 he published a treatise on the botanical family Violaceae titled "Mémoire sur la famille des Violacées". As a taxonomist he described a number of species within the genus Viola and contributed the chapter on Violarieae in Candolle's Prodromus (1824). In 1828 Augustin Pyramus de Candolle named the genus Ginginsia in his honor.

He died 27 February 1863 in Lausanne.

== List of selected publications ==
- Gingins, F de (1823). "Mémoires sur la Famille des Violacees". Mémoires de la Société de physique et d'histoire naturelle de Genève. 2 (1): 1–27.
- Gingins, F de (1824–1873). "Violarieae". In de Candolle, A. P. (ed.). Prodromus systematis naturalis regni vegetabilis, sive, Enumeratio contracta ordinum generum specierumque plantarum huc usque cognitarium, juxta methodi naturalis, normas digesta 17 vols. Vol. 1. Paris: Treuttel et Würtz. pp. 287–320.
- Essai historique sur la souveraineté du Lyonnais, etc., 1835 – Historical essay on the sovereignty of 10th century Lyonnais.
- Essai sur lʹétablissement des Burgunden dans la Gaule et sur le partage des terres entréaux et les régnicoles, 1838 – Essay on the establishment of the Burgundians in Gaul, etc.
- Lettres sur la guerre des Suisses contre le duc Charles-le-Hardi, 1839 – Letters on the war of the Swiss against the duke Charles the Bold.
- Développement de lʹindependance du Haut-Vallais et conquête du Bas-Vallais, 1844 – Development concerning the independence of Haut-Valais and the conquest of Bas-Valais.
- Documents pour servir à l'histoire des comtes de Biandrate, 1847 – Documents used for the history associated with the counts of Biandrate.
- Episodes des guerres de Bourgogne: ao. 1474 à 1476, (1849) – Episodes of the Burgundian Wars: ao. 1474–1476.
- Les Hugonides, 1853.
- Histoire de la ville dʹOrbe et du son chateau dans le moyen age, 1855 – History of the town of Orbe and its castle in the Middle Ages.
- Histoire de la cité et du canton des Équestres, suivie de divers autres opuscules, 1865 – History of the city and canton of Equestres.
