= Tropicos =

Tropical plant database focusing on the Americas

- Producer: Missouri Botanical Garden (United States)
- Languages: English, French, Spanish

Access
- Cost: Open access

Coverage
- Disciplines: Plant taxonomy
- Temporal coverage: 1703–present
- Geospatial coverage: Neotropical realm
- No. of records: 4.2 million

Links
- Website: www.tropicos.org

Tropicos is an online botanical database that provides taxonomic, bibliographic, and specimen data on plants, primarily from the Neotropical realm—which includes regions of Central and South America. Maintained by the Missouri Botanical Garden, the database was established in 1982 and has become a significant resource for botanists, researchers, and plant enthusiasts worldwide. It offers access to images and detailed data on more than 1.4 million plant names and 4.2 million herbarium specimens, along with information from over 49,000 scientific publications.

The platform supports multilingual querying in English, French, and Spanish, facilitating broader international use. The oldest records in the database date back to 1703, reflecting its extensive historical scope.

== Establishment and development ==
Tropicos was initially developed by Robert Magill, a botanist at the Missouri Botanical Garden, during the early 1980s. The project started on an Osborne 01 microcomputer, reflecting the limited computing resources of the time.

Magill continued to oversee the development of the platform, which gradually expanded its data and functionality. In 2002, the database underwent a significant redesign led by Chuck Miller, the CIO of the Missouri Botanical Garden. The new version was reprogrammed in C#/.NET technology, resulting in an improved web interface and enhanced data management capabilities. Since then, Tropicos has been continuously updated and expanded to serve the botanical community better and to support research in tropical regions.

== Content and features ==
Tropicos is an integrated database for a broad range of botanical information, such as taxonomic classifications, nomenclature, specimen data, and bibliographic citations. The database contains high-resolution images of plant specimens, which are useful for identification and research. The advanced search capabilities enable users to search the database by scientific name, author, publication, geographic location, and other parameters. The system also has data analysis and visualization capabilities for research in plant taxonomy, conservation, ecology, and biogeography.

== Impact and usage ==
Tropicos is considered an essential tool for botanists active in the Neotropics and elsewhere. The broad scope and multi-lingual interface of the database make it a valuable asset for international research and education. The database is useful for current research and educational efforts in plant conservation, plant taxonomy, and biodiversity research, particularly in tropical areas where plant diversity is high and often underdocumented. As an open-access resource, Tropicos promotes openness and collaboration within the scientific community, facilitating the sharing of botanical knowledge worldwide.
