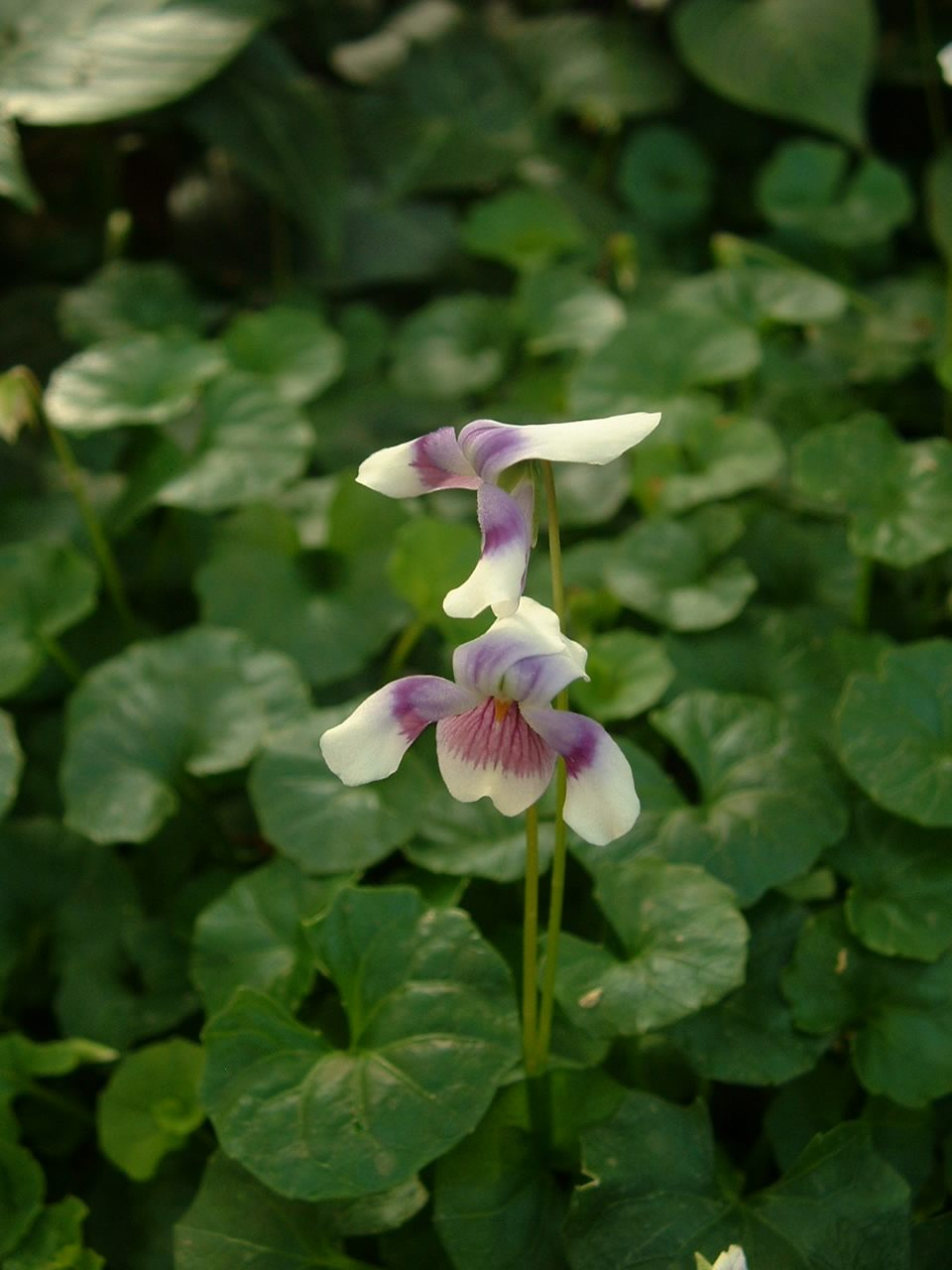
- Viola banksii

Scientific classification
- Kingdom: Plantae
- Clade: Tracheophytes
- Clade: Angiosperms
- Clade: Eudicots
- Clade: Rosids
- Order: Malpighiales
- Family: Violaceae; Batsch

Type genus
- Viola

Subfamilies
- See text.

= Violaceae =

Violaceae Temporal range: Campanian–recent

Family of flowering plants

Violaceae is a family of flowering plants established in 1802, consisting of about 1000 species in about 25 genera. It takes its name from the genus Viola, the violets and pansies.

Older classifications such as the Cronquist system placed the Violaceae in an order named after it, the Violales or the Parietales. However, molecular phylogeny studies place the family in the Malpighiales as reflected in the Angiosperm Phylogeny Group (APG) classification, with 41 other families, where it is situated in the parietal clade of 11 families. Most of the species are found in three large genera, Viola, Rinorea and Hybanthus. The other genera are largely monotypic or oligotypic. The genera are grouped into four clades within the family. The species are largely tropical or subtropical but Viola has a number of species in temperate regions. Many genera have a very restricted distribution.

== Description ==
Though the best-known genus, Viola, is herbaceous, most species are shrubs, lianas or small trees. The simple leaves are alternate or opposite, often with leafy stipules or the stipules are reduced in size. Some species have palmate or deeply dissected leaves. Many species are acaulescent. The flower are solitary in panicles. Some species have cleistogamous flowers produced after or before the production of typical flowers with petals. Flowers are bisexual or unisexual (e.g. Melicytus), actinomorphic but typically zygomorphic with a calyx of five sepals that are persistent after flowering. Corollae have five mostly unequal petals, and the anterior petal is larger and often spurred. Plants have five stamens with the abaxial stamen often spurred at the base. The gynoecium is a compound pistil of three united carpels with one locule. Styles are simple, with the ovary superior and containing many ovules. The fruits are capsules split by way of three seams. Seeds have endosperm.

== Taxonomy ==
That Viola, previously included by Jussieu (1789) under Cisti, should have its own family was first proposed by Ventenat in 1799, and in 1803 placed the Viola species in a new genus, Ionidium which he described as "Famille des violettes." However, in the meantime Batsch established the Violaceae, as a suprageneric rank under the name of Violariae (1802), and as the first formal description, bears his name as the botanical authority. Batsch included eight genera in this family. Although Violariae continued to be used by some authors, such as Don (1831) and Bentham and Hooker (1862) (as Violarieae), most authors, such as Engler (1895), adopted the alternative name Violaceae, proposed by de Lamarck and de Candolle in 1805, and later by Gingins (1823) and Saint-Hilaire (1824). With the establishment of higher suprafamiliar orders, which he called "Alliances", Lindley (1853) placed his Violaceae within the Violales.

== Genera ==
24 genera are accepted.

- Agatea A.Gray
- Allexis Pierre
- Amphirrhox Spreng.
- Anchietea A.St.-Hil.
- Bribria Wahlert & H.E.Ballard
- Calyptrion Ging.
- Cubelium Raf. ex Britton & A.Br.
- Decorsella A.Chev.
- Fusispermum Cuatrec.
- Hybanthopsis Paula-Souza
- Hybanthus Jacq.
- Isodendrion A.Gray
- Ixchelia H.E.Ballard & Wahlert
- Leonia Ruiz & Pav.
- Melicytus J.R.Forst. & G.Forst.
- Noisettia Kunth
- Orthion Standl. & Steyerm.
- Paypayrola Aubl.
- Pigea Ging.
- Pombalia Vand.
- Rinorea Aubl.
- Schweiggeria Spreng.
- Scyphellandra Thwaites
- Viola L.

=== Phylogeny ===
Historically, Violaceae has been placed within a number of orders since Lindley's treatment, principally Violales (Hutchinson, Takhtajan, Cronquist, Thorne) and the equivalent Parietales (Bentham and Hooker, Engler and Prantl, Melchior), although such placement was considered unsatisfactory, but also Polygalinae (Hallier) and Guttiferales (Bessey). Of these, that of Melchior (1925), within the Engler and Prantl system, has been considered one of the most influential. Molecular phylogenetics resulted in the Angiosperm Phylogeny Group (APG) places it as one of a large number of families within the eudicot order Malpighiales. Violaceae, as one of 42 families, is placed in a clade of 10 families within the order. Its place within the parietal clade reflects its earlier position in Parietales, those families with parietal placentation. There it forms a sister group to Goupiaceae.

- - Oxalidales (outgroup)
  - Malpighiales
    - - euphorbioids
        - - Euphorbiaceae
          - Peraceae
        - - phyllanthoids
            - Picrodendraceae
            - Phyllanthaceae
          - linoids
            - Linaceae
            - Ixonanthaceae
      - - parietal clade
          - - salicoids
              - - - - Salicaceae
                    - Scyphostegiaceae
                  - Samydaceae
                - Lacistemataceae
              - - - Passifloraceae
                  - Turneraceae
                - Malesherbiaceae
            - - Violaceae
              - Goupiaceae
          - Achariaceae
        - Humiriaceae
    - - - clusioids
          - - - Hypericaceae
              - Podostemaceae
            - Calophyllaceae
          - - Clusiaceae
            - Bonnetiaceae
        - ochnoids
          - Ochnaceae
          - - Quiinaceae
            - Medusagynaceae
      - - - Rhizophoraceae
          - Erythroxylaceae
        - Ctenolophonaceae
      - - Pandaceae
        - Irvingiaceae
    - - chrysobalanoids
        - - - Chrysobalanaceae
            - Euphroniaceae
          - - Dichapetalaceae
            - Trigoniaceae
        - Balanopaceae
      - malpighioids
        - - Malpighiaceae
          - Elatinaceae
        - Centroplacaceae
      - Caryocaraceae
      - putranjivoids
        - Putranjivaceae
        - Lophopyxidaceae

=== Subdivision ===
==== History ====
The Violaceae are a medium-sized family with about 22–28 genera, and about 1,000–1,100 species. Most of the genera are monotypic or oligotypic, but the three genera Viola (about 600 species), Rinorea (about 250 species), and Hybanthus include 98% of the species with about half the species in Viola, and more than three-quarters of the remainder in the other two genera.

Many attempts have been made at an intrafamilial classification, but these have largely been artificial, based on floral characteristics. Subdivisions were recognized almost immediately. Early classifications identified two major divisions, that were followed by most taxonomists;

- Alsodeieae (Alsodineae, Rinoreeae). Radially symmetrical flowers (actinomorphic)
- Violeae. Bilaterally symmetrical flowers (zygomorphic)

These also had biogeographical correlation, with the latter being almost exclusively South American and African, and the former being distributed in Europe in addition to the Americas. In contrast, Bentham and Hooker (and some others) divided Alsodeieae, giving three tribes:

- Violeae. Strictly zygomorphic
- Paypayroleae. Actinomorphic with some zygomorphic features
- Alsodeieae. Strictly actinomorphic

Melchior utilized a more complex classification with two subfamilies, tribes and subtribes to recognize the place of Leonia within the Violaceae:

- Subfamily Violoideae
  - Tribe Rinoreeae
    - Subtribe Rinoreinae (Rinorea, Allexis, Gloeospermum)
    - Subtribe Hymenantherina (Melicytus, Hymenanthera)
    - Subtribe Isodendriinae (Isodendrion)
    - Subtribe Paypayrolinae (Amphirrhox, Paypayrola)
  - Tribe Violeae
    - Subtribe Hybanthinae (Hybanthus, Agatea)
    - Subtribe Violinae (Anchietea, Corynostylis, Schweiggeria, Noisettia, Viola)
- Subfamily Leonioideae (Leonia)

The historical subdivisions shown here are those of the system of Hekking (1988), based largely on floral symmetry, petal aestivation and petal morphology. In this system, most genera occur in the Rinoreae and Violeae tribes. Three subfamilies have been recognized: the Violoideae, Leonioideae, and Fusispermoideae.

===== Subfamily Fusispermoideae =====
- Fusispermum Cuatrec.

===== Subfamily Leonioideae =====
- Leonia Ruiz & Pav.

===== Subfamily Violoideae =====
====== Subtribe Hymenantherinae ======
- Hymenanthera R.Br.
- Melicytus J.R.Forst. & G.Forst.

====== Subtribe Isodendriinae ======
- Isodendrion A.Gray

====== Subtribe Paypayrolinae ======
- Amphirrhox Spreng.
- Paypayrola Aubl. (including Hekkingia J. K. Munzinger & H.E.Ballard)

====== Subtribe Rinoreinae ======
- Allexis Pierre
- Decorsella A.Chev. (including Gymnorinorea Keay)
- Gloeospermum Triana & Planch.
- Rinorea Aubl. (including Alsodeia Thouars, Phyllanoa Croizat, Scyphellandra Thwaites)
- Rinoreocarpus Ducke

====== Tribe Violeae ======
About 600 species, in the following genera, but mainly in Viola and Hybanthus and including all four of the lianescent genera in the family (Agatea, Anchietea, Calyptrion and Hybanthopsis;

- Anchietea A.St.-Hil.
- Corynostylis Mart. (including Agatea A.Gray and Agation Brongn. and a synonym of Calyptrion)
- Hybanthopsis Paula-Souza
- Hybanthus Jacq. (included Acentra Phil., Clelandia J.M.Black, Cubelium Raf. ex Britton & A.Br., Ionidium Vent., Pigea DC.)
- Mayanaea Lundell
- Noisettia Kunth
- Orthion Standl. & Steyerm.
- Pombalia Vand.
- Schweiggeria Spreng.
- Viola L. (including Erpetion Sweet, Mnemion Spach)

==== Molecular systems ====
Molecular phylogenetic studies have revealed that many of these divisions were not monophyletic, partly due to homoplasy. These studies demonstrate four major clades within the family.

The molecularly defined subdivisions are;

- Clade 1: Viola, Schweiggeria, Noisettia, Allexis
- Clade 2: Paypayrola, Hekkingia
- Clade 3: Leonia, Gloeospermum, Amphirrhox, Orthion, Mayanaea, Hybanthus concolor, the Hybanthus havanensis Group, and the Hybanthus caledonicus Group
- Clade 4: largely unresolved

In Clade 1, Schweiggeria and Noisettia are monotypic and form a sister group to Viola. In addition to the major clades, there were a number of unplaced segregates.

=== Etymology ===
The family derives its name from the nominative genus, Viola.

== Distribution and habitat ==
The Violaceae have an overall cosmopolitan distribution, but are essentially tropical and subtropical, with the exception of the numerous Northern Hemisphere temperate species of Viola, the largest genus, which is also occurs at higher altitudes in its tropical and subtropical regions, where the shrub, tree and lianescent species are concentrated. In those regions, most representative genera are the mainly woody Rinorea and Hybanthus. While Viola, Hybanthus, and Rinorea are widely distributed in both hemispheres, the remaining genera are relatively restricted in their distribution. Some are restricted to a single continent while others have a limited area involving just a single archipelago. About 70 species are found in Brazil.

- Allexis, tropical West Africa
- Amphirrhox, Anchietea, Gloeospermum, Leonia, Noisettia, Paypayrola, tropical South America
- Corynostylis, Schweiggeria, tropical Central and South America
- Melicytus, New Zealand and nearby islands
- Hymenanthera, Australia and New Zealand
- Agatea, New Caledonia, New Guinea, and the Fiji Islands
- Isodendrion, Sandwich Islands and Hawaii

== Bibliography ==
=== Books and theses ===
- Ballard, Harvey E; Paula-Souza, Juliana de; Wahlert, Gregory A (2013). "Violaceae". In Kubitzki, Klaus (ed.). Flowering Plants. 11 Eudicots: Malpighiales. Springer Science & Business Media. pp. 303–322. ISBN 978-3-642-39417-1.(Also preview at Springer)
- Byng, James W. (2014). "Violaceae". The Flowering Plants Handbook: A practical guide to families and genera of the world. Plant Gateway Ltd. pp. 238–239. ISBN 978-0-9929993-1-5.
- Christenhusz, Maarten J. M.; Fay, Michael F.; Chase, Mark W. (2017). "Violaceae". Plants of the World: An Illustrated Encyclopedia of Vascular Plants. University of Chicago Press. pp. 324–325. ISBN 978-0-226-52292-0.
- Sharma, O. P. (2009) [1993]. "Violales". Plant Taxonomy (2nd ed.). Tata McGraw-Hill Education. pp. 43, 172, 249. ISBN 978-1-259-08137-8.
- Singh, V; Jain, D K (2006) [1981]. "Violaceae". Taxonomy of Angiosperms (2nd ed.). New Delhi: Rastogi Publications. pp. 189–193. ISBN 978-81-7133-849-8.
- Paula-Souza, Juliana de; Pirani, José Rubens (2014). "A biogeographical overview of the "lianescent clade" of Violaceae in the Neotropical region". In Greer, Francis Eliott (ed.). Dry Forests: Ecology, Species Diversity and Sustainable Management. Environmental Science, Engineering and Technology. Nova Science Publishers. pp. 1–28. ISBN 978-1-63321-291-6.
- Souza, Juliana de Paula (2009). Estudos filogenéticos em Violaceae com ênfase na tribo Violeae e revisão taxonômica dos gêneros Lianescentes de Violaceae na região [Neotropical Phylogenetic studies on tribe Violeae and taxonomic revision of the Neotropical Lianescent genera of Violaceae] (PhD thesis) (in Brazilian Portuguese). Instituto de Biociências, Universidade de São Paulo.

Historical sources

- Batsch, August Johann Georg Karl (1802). "Violariae". Tabula affinitatum regni vegetabilis, quam delineavit, et nunc ulterius adumbratam (in Latin). Weimar: Landes-Industrie-Comptoir. pp. 57–59.
- Bentham, G.; Hooker, J.D. (1862). "Violarieae". Genera plantarum ad exemplaria imprimis in herbariis kewensibus servata definita (3 vols.). Vol. 1. London: L Reeve & Co. pp. 114–121.
- de Candolle, A. P. (1824–1873). "Violarieae". Prodromus systematis naturalis regni vegetabilis, sive, Enumeratio contracta ordinum generum specierumque plantarum huc usque cognitarium, juxta methodi naturalis, normas digesta 17 vols. Vol. 1. Paris: Treuttel et Würtz. pp. 287–316.(This chapter largely the work of Gingins, see footnote p. 287)
- Don, George (1831). "Violarieae". A general history of the dichlamydeous plants: comprising complete descriptions of the different orders...the whole arranged according to the natural system IV vols. Vol. 1. London: J.G. and F. Rivington. pp. 315–343.
- Jussieu, Antoine Laurent de (1789). "Cisti: Viola". Genera plantarum: secundum ordines naturales disposita, juxta methodum in Horto regio parisiensi exaratam, anno M.DCC.LXXIV (in Latin). Paris. p. 294. OCLC 5161409.
- de Lamarck, Jean-Baptiste; de Candolle, AP (1815) [1805]. "Violaceae". Flore française ou descriptions succinctes de toutes les plantes qui croissent naturellement en France disposées selon une nouvelle méthode d'analyse; et précédées par un exposé des principes élémentaires de la botanique (in French). Vol. IV(2) (3rd ed.). Paris: Desray. pp. 801−810. (Latin Index page 931)
- Lindley, John (1853) [1846]. "Violaceae". The Vegetable Kingdom: or, The structure, classification, and uses of plants, illustrated upon the natural system (3rd. ed.). London: Bradbury & Evans. pp. 338−339.
- Melchior, Hans (1925) [1887–1915]. "Violaceae". In Engler, Adolf; Prantl, Karl (eds.). Die natürlichen Pflanzenfamilien nebst ihren Gattungen und wichtigeren Arten, insbesondere den Nutzpflanzen, unter Mitwirkung zahlreicher hervorragender Fachgelehrten 21 parts (Abteilungen) (in German). Vol. 21 (2nd ed.). Berlin: Duncker & Humblot. pp. 329–377.
- Reiche, P; Taubert, K (1887–1915). "Violaceae". In Engler, Adolf; Prantl, Karl (eds.). Die Natürlichen Pflanzenfamilien nebst ihren Gattungen und wichtigeren Arten, insbesondere den Nutzpflanzen, unter Mitwirkung zahlreicher hervorragender Fachgelehrten (in German). Vol. 33 parts (Abteilungen) in 23 volumes (1st ed.). Leipzig: W. Engelmann. pp. 322–336.
- Ventenat, Étienne-Pierre (1799). "Viola". Tableau du règne végétal, selon la méthode de Jussieu (in French). Vol. 3. Paris: J. Drisonnier. pp. 222–223.
- Ventenat, É. P (1803–1804). "Ionidium". Jardin de la Malmaison 2 vols (in French). Vol. 1. Paris: Crapelet. pp. 27–28.

=== Articles ===
- Angiosperm Phylogeny Group IV (2016). "An update of the Angiosperm Phylogeny Group classification for the orders and families of flowering plants: APG IV". Botanical Journal of the Linnean Society. 181 (1): 1–20. doi:10.1111/boj.12385.
- Endress, Peter K.; Davis, Charles C.; Matthews, Merran L. (May 2013). "Advances in the floral structural characterization of the major subclades of Malpighiales, one of the largest orders of flowering plants". Annals of Botany. 111 (5): 969–985. doi:10.1093/aob/mct056. PMC 3631340. PMID 23486341.
- Gingins, F de (1823). "Mémoires sur la Famille des Violacees". Mémoires de la Société de Physique et d'Histoire Naturelle de Genève. 2 (1): 1–27.
- Hekking, W. H. A. (1988). "Violaceae Part I–Rinorea and Rinoreocarpus". Flora Neotropica. 46: 1–207.
- de Paula-Souza, Juliana; Souza, Vinicius Castro (July 2003). "Hybanthopsis, a new genus of Violaceae from Eastern Brazil". Brittonia. 55 (3): 209–213. doi:10.1663/0007-196X(2003)055[0209:HANGOV]2.0.CO;2. S2CID 9681796.
- Saint-Hilaire, Augustin (1824). "Tableau monographique des plantes de la flore du Brésil méridional appartenant au groupe (classe Br.) qui comprend qui comprend les Droséracées, les Violacées, les Cistinées et les Frankenicées: Violacées". Annales du museum national d'histoire naturelle (in French). 72: 445–498.
- Taylor, Fred H. (1972). "The Secondary Xylem of the Violaceae: A Comparative Study". Botanical Gazette. 133 (3): 230–242. doi:10.1086/336638. JSTOR 2473911. S2CID 84004940.
- Wahlert, Gregory A.; Marcussen, Thomas; de Paula-Souza, Juliana; Feng, Min; Ballard, Harvey E. (1 March 2014). "A Phylogeny of the Violaceae (Malpighiales) Inferred from Plastid DNA Sequences: Implications for Generic Diversity and Intrafamilial Classification". Systematic Botany. 39 (1): 239–252. doi:10.1600/036364414X678008. S2CID 86452033.
- Xi, Z.; Ruhfel, B. R.; Schaefer, H.; Amorim, A. M.; Sugumaran, M.; Wurdack, K. J.; Endress, P. K.; Matthews, M. L.; Stevens, P. F.; Mathews, S.; Davis, C. C. (2012). "Phylogenomics and a posteriori data partitioning resolve the Cretaceous angiosperm radiation Malpighiales". Proceedings of the National Academy of Sciences. 109 (43): 17519–24. Bibcode:2012PNAS..10917519X. doi:10.1073/pnas.1205818109. PMC 3491498. PMID 23045684.

=== Websites ===
- WFO (2019). "Violaceae Batsch". World Flora Online.
- IPNI. "Violaceae Batsch, Tab. Affin. Regni Veg. 57 (1802)". Royal Botanic Gardens, Kew.
