= Wellingtonia =

Wellingtonia can mean:

- A genus of plants in the family Sabiaceae, usually treated as a synonym of the genus Meliosma.
- A vernacular name for the coniferous tree Sequoiadendron giganteum.
- Wellingtonia (horse) was a thoroughbred racehorse in the late 19th century.
