= Scotura leucophleps =

Scientific classification
- Kingdom: Animalia
- Phylum: Arthropoda
- Clade: Pancrustacea
- Class: Insecta
- Order: Lepidoptera
- Superfamily: Noctuoidea
- Family: Notodontidae
- Genus: Scotura
- Species: S. leucophleps

Binomial name
- Scotura leucophleps Warren, 1909

Species of moth

Scotura leucophleps is a moth of the family Notodontidae. It is found in Nicaragua, Costa Rica and Panama.

The larvae feed on Rinorea panamensis, Rinorea squamata and Rinorea deflexiflora.
