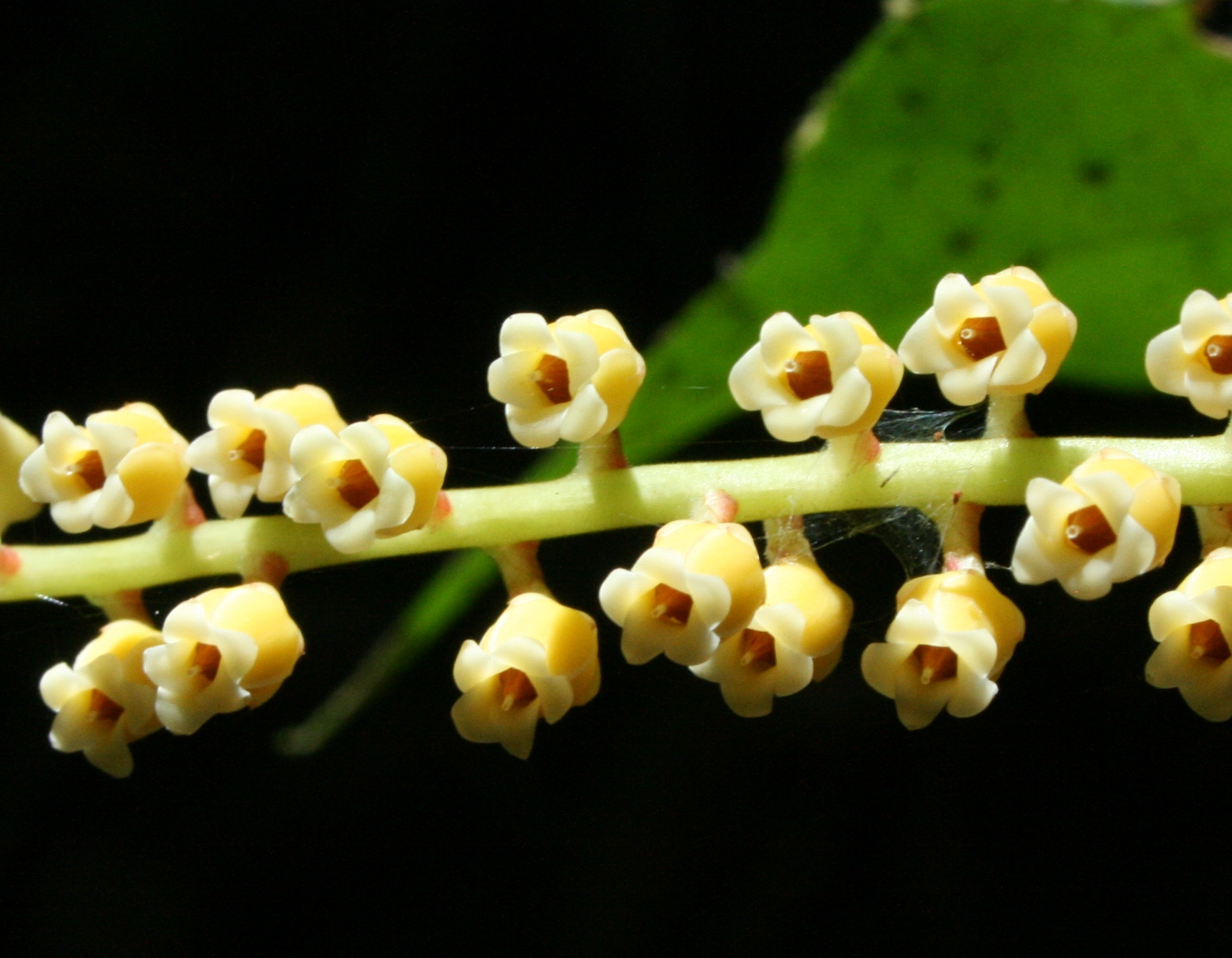
- Rinorea melanodonta

Scientific classification
- Kingdom: Plantae
- Clade: Embryophytes
- Clade: Tracheophytes
- Clade: Spermatophytes
- Clade: Angiosperms
- Clade: Eudicots
- Clade: Rosids
- Order: Malpighiales
- Family: Violaceae
- Subfamily: Violoideae
- Tribe: Rinoreeae
- Subtribe: Rinoreinae
- Genus: Rinorea; Aubl. (1775)

Synonyms
- Alsodeia A.Thouars (1808); Ceranthera P.Beauv. (1808); Conohoria Aubl. (1775); Cuspa Humb. (1814); Dioryktandra Hassk. (1855); Dripax Noronha ex Thouars (1806); Exotanthera Turcz. (1854 publ. 1855); Juergensia Spreng. (1818), nom. superfl.; Medusa Lour. (1790); Passoura Aubl. (1775); Pentaloba Lour. (1790); Physiphora Sol. ex Ging. (1824); Prosthesia Blume (1826); Riana Aubl. (1775); Vareca Roxb. (1824), nom. illeg.

= Rinorea =

Genus of plants

Rinorea is a genus of flowering plants in family Violaceae. It includes 221 species native to the subtropics and tropics.

== Selected species ==
221 species are accepted. Selected species include:

- Rinorea abbreviata Achound. & Bos
- Rinorea acutidens M.Brandt
- Rinorea antioquiensis L.B.Sm. & A.Fernández
- Rinorea bengalensis (Wall.) Kuntze
- Rinorea bicornuta Hekking
- Rinorea brachythrix S.F.Blake
- Rinorea cordata L.B.Sm. & A.Fernández
- Rinorea dasyadena A.Robyns
- Rinorea deflexa (Benth.) S.F.Blake
- Rinorea deflexiflora Bartlett
- Rinorea dentata (P. Beauv.) Kuntze
- Rinorea endotricha Sandwith
- Rinorea fausteana Achound.
- Rinorea guatemalensis (S.Watson) Bartlett
- Rinorea haughtii L.B.Sm. & A.Fernández
- Rinorea hirsuta Hekking
- Rinorea hummelii Sprague
- Rinorea hymenosepala S.F.Blake
- Rinorea keayi Brenan
- Rinorea laurifolia L.B.Sm. & A.Fernández
- Rinorea longistipulata Hekking
- Rinorea marginata (Triana & Planch.) Rusby ex J.R.Johnst.
- Rinorea maximiliani (Eichler) Kuntze
- Rinorea melanodonta S.F.Blake
- Rinorea niccolifera Fernando
- Rinorea pectino-squamata Hekking
- Rinorea ramiziana Glaz. ex Hekking
- Rinorea squamata S.F.Blake
- Rinorea thomasii Achound.
- Rinorea thomensis Exell
- Rinorea ulmifolia (Spreng.) Kuntze
- Rinorea villosiflora Hekking
- Rinorea welwitschii (Oliv.) Kuntze

=== Formerly placed here ===
- Bribria crenata (S.F.Blake) Wahlert & H.E.Ballard (as Rinorea crenata S.F.Blake)
- Bribria oraria (Steyerm. & A.Fernández) Wahlert & H.E.Ballard (as Rinorea oraria Steyerm. & A.Fernández)
- Ixchelia uxpanapana (T.Wendt) Wahlert & H.E.Ballard (as Rinorea uxpanapana T.Wendt)
