= Scotura annulata =

Scientific classification
- Kingdom: Animalia
- Phylum: Arthropoda
- Clade: Pancrustacea
- Class: Insecta
- Order: Lepidoptera
- Superfamily: Noctuoidea
- Family: Notodontidae
- Genus: Scotura
- Species: S. annulata

Binomial name
- Scotura annulata (Guérin-Méneville, 1844)

Synonyms
- Zunacetha annulata (Guérin-Méneville, 1844); Zunacetha bipartita Walker, 1863; Mieza nervosa Felder and Rogenhofer, 1875; Zunacetha nervosa (Felder & Rogenhofer, 1875)

Species of moth

Scotura annulata is a moth of the family Notodontidae. It is found from Texas, south through Central America (including Panama and Costa Rica) to Argentina.

The larvae have been recorded on Hybanthus prunifolius in Panama. Other recorded host plants include Acalypha diversifolia, Chamaedorea, Randia and Meliosma species.
