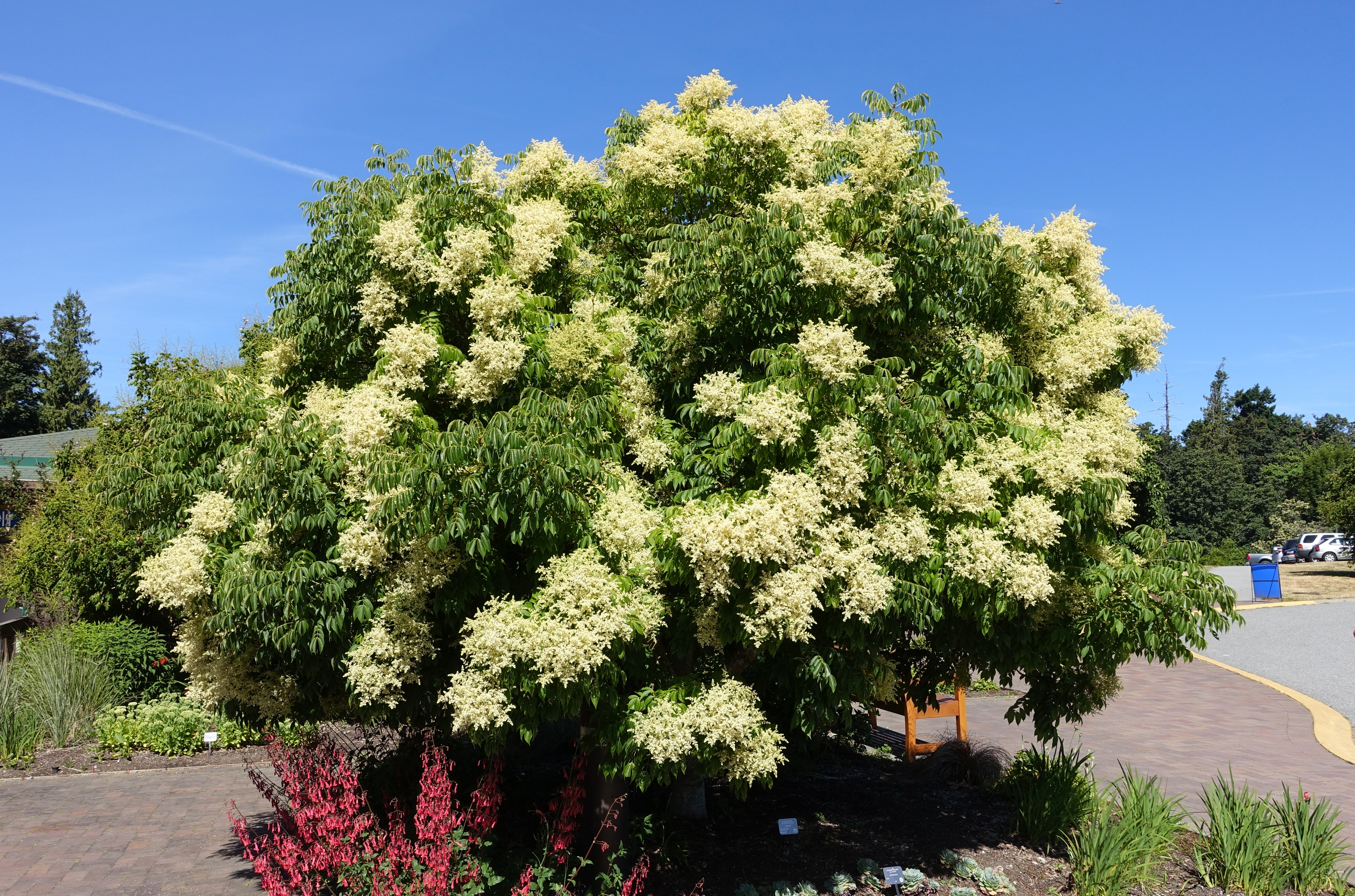

Conservation status
- Least Concern (IUCN 3.1)

Scientific classification
- Kingdom: Plantae
- Clade: Tracheophytes
- Clade: Angiosperms
- Clade: Eudicots
- Order: Proteales
- Family: Sabiaceae
- Genus: Meliosma
- Species: M. oldhamii

Binomial name
- Meliosma oldhamii Maxim.

Synonyms
- Homotypic Synonyms: Meliosma arnottiana var. oldhamii (Maxim.) H.Ohba; Meliosma arnottiana subsp. oldhamii (Maxim.) H.Ohba; Meliosma pinnata var. oldhamii (Maxim.) Beusekom

= Meliosma oldhamii =

Species of tree

Meliosma oldhamii is a species of deciduous tree in the family Sabiaceae. It grows up to 20 metres (66 ft) in height. It has a narrow crown when young, and it becomes more wide-spreading with age. It is endemic to China, Japan, and Korea.

== Description ==
Its leaves are odd-pinnate, coriaceous, 15–50 cm (5.9–19.7 in) long, comprising 9–17 leaflets, each of which is 3–15 cm (1.2–5.9 in) long by 1–5 cm (0.39–1.97 in) wide, and ovate to elliptic-lanceolate in shape.

== Habitat ==
It grows in a variety of habitats, but is dominant within forests such as valley forests or mountain forests. It can also be found growing within mountain slopes that have a humid temperature. It is found at elevations ranging from 300 to 1,900 metres (980 to 6,230 ft).

== Cultivation ==
M. oldhamii thrives in temperatures which are mildly hot to hot. It's incapable of surviving cold temperatures. The plant can survive −15 °C (5 °F).

The pollen of M. oldhamii reaches maturity which then causes the cells within the anther to burst and expel all their pollen while the flower still hasn't grown to maturity yet. Even though the anther cells burst releasing pollen, it remains within the cavities of the staminodes. Pollen remains trapped within such cavities until the bud has matured fully and is ready to bloom. Then the bud explodes, releasing the pollen into the air which is then moved around naturally to pollinate other plants. When the flowers finally bloom within this plant, the petals and stamens fall off since their only job is to allow the pollen to be distributed. Therefore, most of the times when observing a mature M. oldhamii plant it's observed that only buds are found since the flowers drop off.

== Uses ==
The plants leaves can be cooked and eaten. The wood of M. oldhamii is used to create small day to day objects such as boxes. The wood can also be used as a fuel source for fires. The wood has no commercial use because it's not strong.
