= Meliosma vernicosa =

Conservation status
- Near Threatened (IUCN 3.1)

Scientific classification
- Kingdom: Plantae
- Clade: Tracheophytes
- Clade: Angiosperms
- Clade: Eudicots
- Order: Proteales
- Family: Sabiaceae
- Genus: Meliosma
- Species: M. vernicosa

Binomial name
- Meliosma vernicosa Planch. ex Griseb.

Synonyms
- Lorenzanea vernicosa Liebm.

Species of tree

Meliosma vernicosa is a tropical tree in the family Sabiaceae. It is a canopy tree of the cloud forest that reaches 20 to 25 meters tall. It prefers elevations of 1500 to 1700 meters. It is found in Costa Rica.
