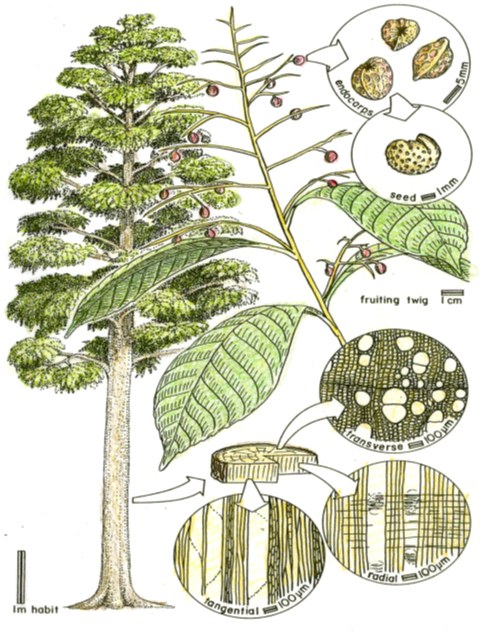
- Reconstruction of Meliosma beusekomii from the Eocene (44 ma) of Oregon.

Scientific classification
- Kingdom: Plantae
- Clade: Tracheophytes
- Clade: Angiosperms
- Clade: Eudicots
- Order: Proteales
- Family: Sabiaceae
- Genus: Meliosma
- Species: †M. beusekomii

Binomial name
- †Meliosma beusekomii Manchester

= Meliosma beusekomii =

Meliosma beusekomii Temporal range: Eocene

Extinct species of flowering plant

Meliosma beusekomii is an extinct species of Meliosma from the middle Eocene (44 Ma) Clarno Formation of central Oregon.
