= Meliosma linearifolia =

Conservation status
- Endangered (IUCN 2.3)

Scientific classification
- Kingdom: Plantae
- Clade: Tracheophytes
- Clade: Angiosperms
- Clade: Eudicots
- Order: Proteales
- Family: Sabiaceae
- Genus: Meliosma
- Species: M. linearifolia

Binomial name
- Meliosma linearifolia A.H.Gentry

Species of plant

Meliosma linearifolia is a species of plant in the Sabiaceae family. It is endemic to Panama. It is threatened by habitat loss.
