= Rinorea niccolifera =

Conservation status
- Endangered (IUCN 3.1)

Scientific classification
- Kingdom: Plantae
- Clade: Tracheophytes
- Clade: Angiosperms
- Clade: Eudicots
- Clade: Rosids
- Order: Malpighiales
- Family: Violaceae
- Genus: Rinorea
- Species: R. niccolifera

Binomial name
- Rinorea niccolifera Fernando

Species of flowering plant

Rinorea niccolifera is a species of plant in the Violaceae family.

The plant was discovered on the island of Luzon in the Philippines, and described in 2014. It is known for its ability to bio-accumulate nickel. Specimens have been recorded with more than 18,000 μg of nickel per gram (dry weight) in their tissues, classifying it as a hyperaccumulator. It most closely resembles Rinorea bengalensis, also a known nickel hyperaccumulator.
