= Scotura niveilimba =

Scientific classification
- Kingdom: Animalia
- Phylum: Arthropoda
- Clade: Pancrustacea
- Class: Insecta
- Order: Lepidoptera
- Superfamily: Noctuoidea
- Family: Notodontidae
- Genus: Scotura
- Species: S. niveilimba

Binomial name
- Scotura niveilimba Miller, 2008

Synonyms
- Scotura venata Butler, 1878

Species of moth

Scotura niveilimba is a moth of the family Notodontidae. It is native to Brazil and Peru. It was formerly known as Scotura venata until 2008, when the species Oricia venata was transferred into the genus Scotura. This led to the present species' name becoming a junior secondary homonym. Thus, the name was replaced by the nomen novum Scotura niveilimba.

== Taxonomy ==
Scotura niveilimba was initially formally described as Scotura venata by the English entomologist Arthur Gardiner Butler in 1878 based on a female collected from the Juruá River in the Brazilian state of Amazonas. The species retained this scientific name for over 100 years, until a 2008 review of the taxonomy of the subfamily Dioptinae by the American entomologist John S. Miller determined that the species Oricia venata, described by Butler in 1877, was actually a member of the genus Scotura. As two species cannot have the same scientific name and the species originally known as Oricia venata had been described earlier, the name of the present species became a junior secondary homonym and had to be replaced. Miller proposed the nomen novum Scotura niveilimba. The specific epithet is derived from the Latin words meaning "snowy-bordered", alluding to the unique white border to the hindwing that this species possesses.

Scotura niveilimba forms a species complex with its congeners S. nervosa and S. intermedia, within which the specific boundaries of these distinct species are poorly defined and understood. Consequently, further analysis of this complex may lead to S. niveilimba being synonymized with either of those two species.

== Distribution and habitat ==
Scotura niveilimba is currently known to be native to Brazil and Peru.
