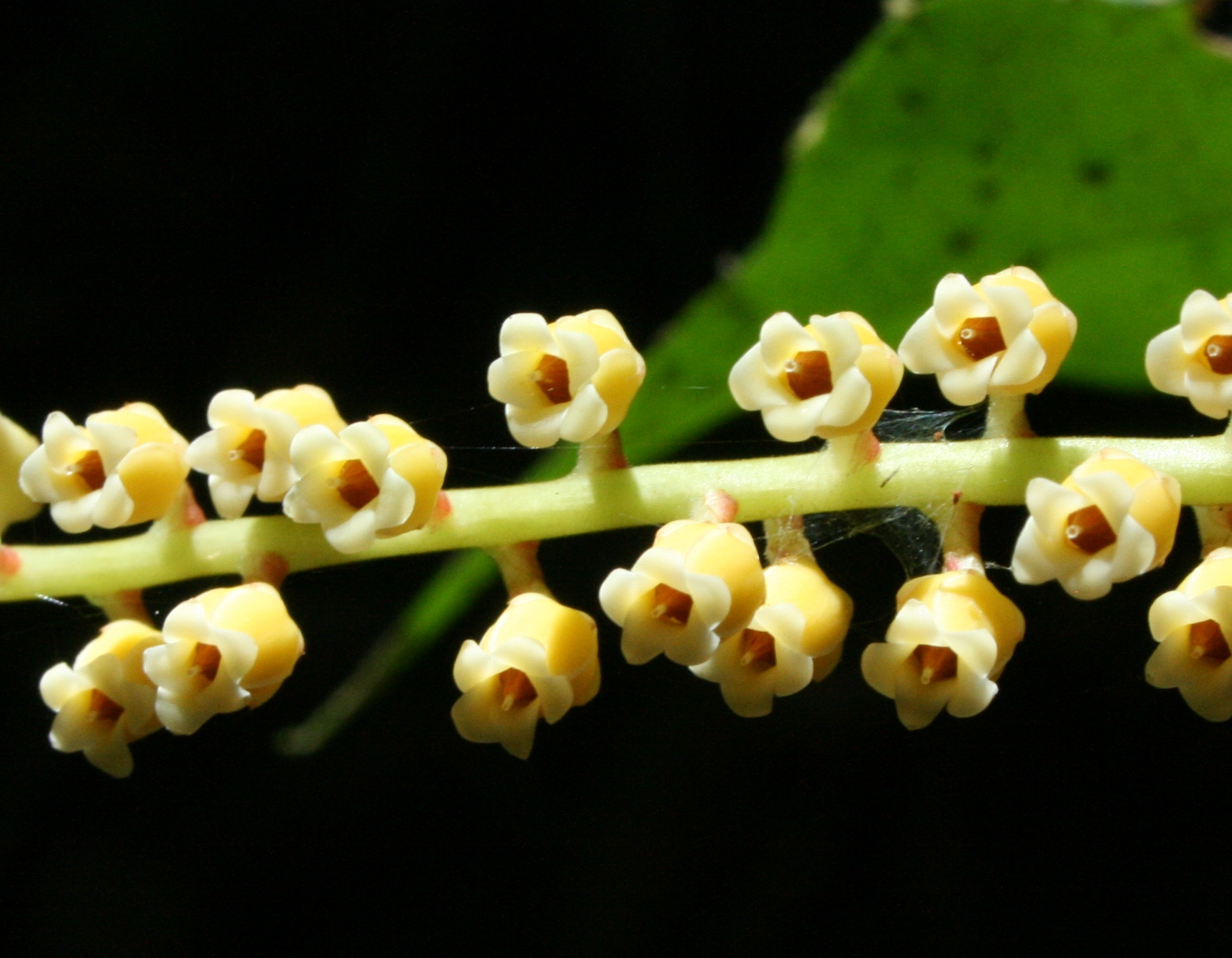

Conservation status
- Least Concern (IUCN 3.1)

Scientific classification
- Kingdom: Plantae
- Clade: Tracheophytes
- Clade: Angiosperms
- Clade: Eudicots
- Clade: Rosids
- Order: Malpighiales
- Family: Violaceae
- Genus: Rinorea
- Species: R. melanodonta

Binomial name
- Rinorea melanodonta S.F.Blake

= Rinorea melanodonta =

Species of plant

Rinorea melanodonta is a species of tree native to countries such as Colombia, Venezuela, Trinidad-Tobago, and Guyana. It occurs at an elevation range from 200 to 300 metres (660 to 980 ft).

It is related to Rinorea brachythrix but is differentiated by the short filaments. This species can also grow up to 4 to 5 metres (13 to 16 ft) tall.
