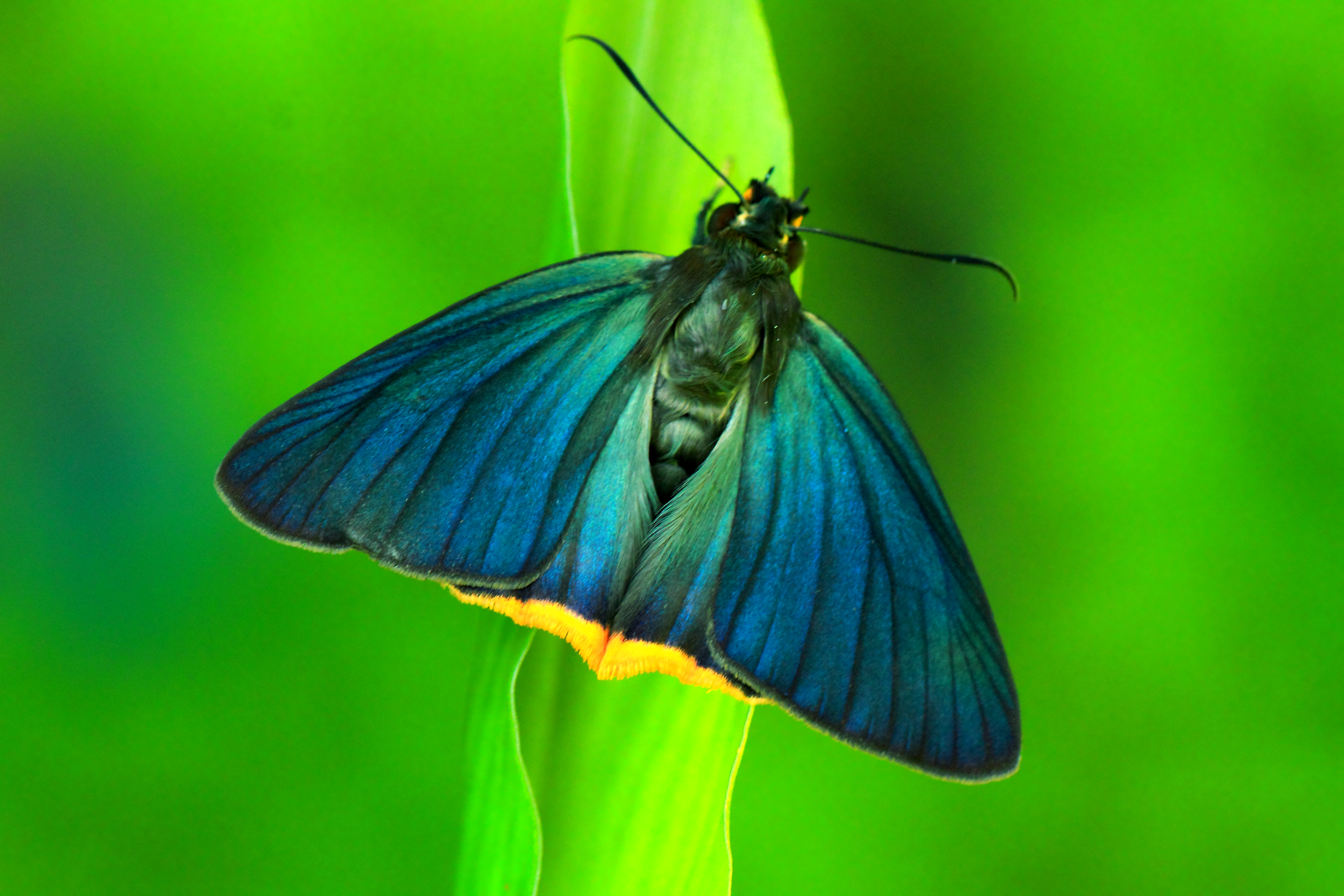
- dorsal view
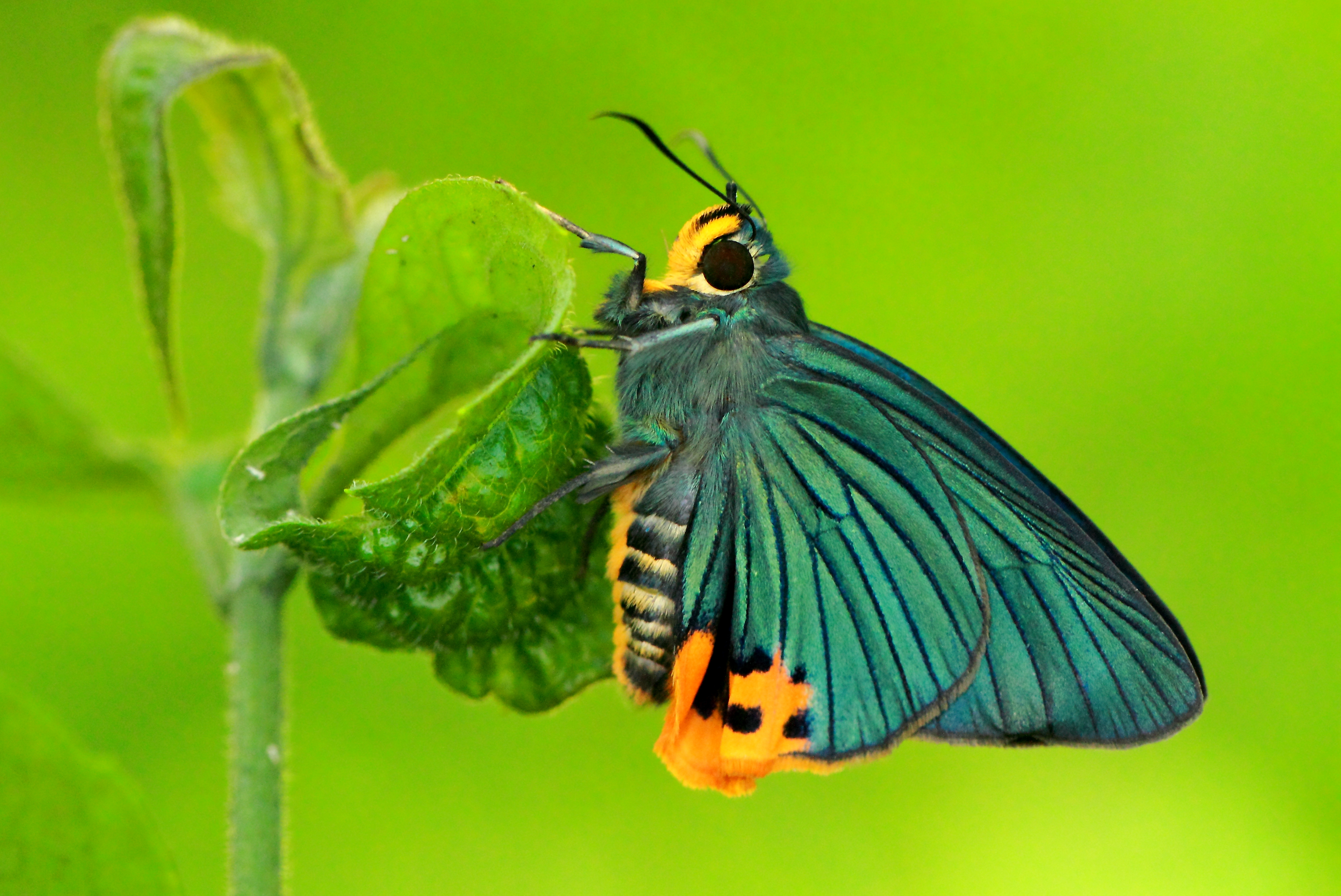
- lateral view

Scientific classification
- Kingdom: Animalia
- Phylum: Arthropoda
- Clade: Pancrustacea
- Class: Insecta
- Order: Lepidoptera
- Family: Hesperiidae
- Genus: Choaspes
- Species: C. benjaminii

Binomial name
- Choaspes benjaminii (Guérin-Méneville, 1843)

= Choaspes benjaminii =

Indian awlking

Species of butterfly

Choaspes benjaminii, also known as the Indian awlking or common awlking, is a species of butterfly in the family Hesperiidae. The species is named after Benjamin Delessert and was described on the basis of a specimen collected by Adolphe Delessert in the Nilgiris.

== Range ==
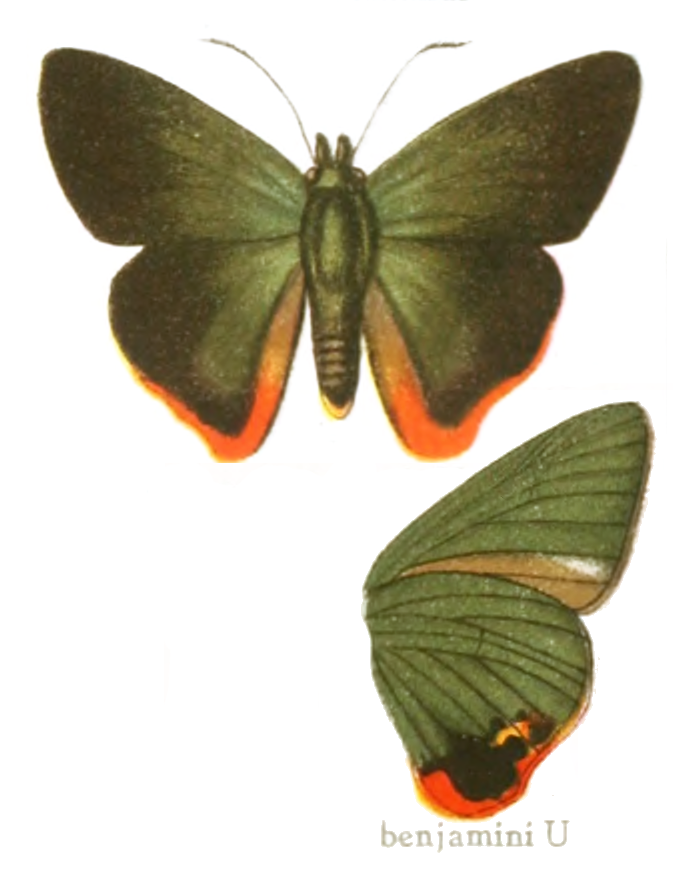

The Indian awlking is found in Sri Lanka, India, northern Myanmar, Malaysia, Taiwan and Japan.

In India, the Indian awlking ranges from the Palni Hills, Nilgiris and Kodagu in the south to northern and eastern India; from Kulu to Assam and eastwards onto Myanmar.

The type locality is Nilgiris in South India.

== Description ==
The Indian awlking is 50 to 60 mm long. It is distinguished by the shining green under hindwing with black veins, orange area with black spots on the tornus.

The male butterfly is shining indigo blue above. It has purplish hairs at the base which turn greenish with age. Cilia of hindwing and anal lobe broadly ochreous red.

The female butterfly is dark shining green with bluish-grey hairs at the base. forewing with a broad pale cupreous brown band on posterior margin; hindwing with a broad ochreous-red lobular patch with black macular upper border and broad central angular streak.

Thorax greyish olive above, vertex bluish olive, abdomen brown; palpi and thorax in front and abdomen beneath, ochreous red.

== Habits ==
The Indian awlking is found in heavy jungles from 3,500 to 8,000 feet (1,100 to 2,400 m) in the hills. It is attracted to flowers and animal and bird droppings. It frequents the shade in the daytime but is found flying in the open during the early and late hours of the day.

== Life cycle ==
=== Caterpillars ===
Larva with broad transverse dorsal black and yellow bands and two rows of white spots along the back; head, two anal segments and laterally below the bands red; face black spotted.

=== Pupa ===
Pupa pinkish grey black spotted. The larva rolls itself upon the tip of the leaf on which it feeds, and when it has eaten this leaf it goes to another, and so on till it changes to pupa.

=== Host plants ===
The larva (caterpillar) has been recorded on Meliosma arnottiana, Meliosma pinnata, Meliosma simplicifolia, Sabia campanulata, Meliosma pungens, Meliosma rhoifolia, Meliosma rigida, Meliosma squamulata, and Buddleja.

== See also ==
- Coeliadinae
- Hesperiidae
- List of butterflies of India (Coeliadinae)
- List of butterflies of India (Hesperiidae)
