= Meliosma littlei =

Conservation status
- Critically Endangered (IUCN 3.1)

Scientific classification
- Kingdom: Plantae
- Clade: Embryophytes
- Clade: Tracheophytes
- Clade: Spermatophytes
- Clade: Angiosperms
- Clade: Eudicots
- Order: Proteales
- Family: Sabiaceae
- Genus: Meliosma
- Species: M. littlei

Binomial name
- Meliosma littlei Cuatrec.

Species of flowering plant

Meliosma littlei is a species of flowering plant in the Sabiaceae family. It is a tree which grows up to 20 metres tall. It is endemic to western Ecuador, where it grows in evergreen tropical moist forests from 800 to 1,000 metres elevation.

The species was described by José Cuatrecasas in 1959. The IUCN Red List assesses the species as Critically Endangered.
