= Meliosma sirensis =

Conservation status
- Vulnerable (IUCN 2.3)

Scientific classification
- Kingdom: Plantae
- Clade: Tracheophytes
- Clade: Angiosperms
- Clade: Eudicots
- Order: Proteales
- Family: Sabiaceae
- Genus: Meliosma
- Species: M. sirensis

Binomial name
- Meliosma sirensis A.H.Gentry

Species of plant

Meliosma sirensis is a species of plant in the Sabiaceae family. It is endemic to Peru.
