= Meliosma cordata =

Conservation status
- Data Deficient (IUCN 2.3)

Scientific classification
- Kingdom: Plantae
- Clade: Tracheophytes
- Clade: Angiosperms
- Clade: Eudicots
- Order: Proteales
- Family: Sabiaceae
- Genus: Meliosma
- Species: M. cordata

Binomial name
- Meliosma cordata A.H.Gentry

Species of flowering plant

Meliosma cordata is a species of plant in the Sabiaceae family. It is endemic to Panama.

== General information ==
The tree is 3-6 meters tall, with branchlets covered with fine hairs that grows into large scattered pale lenticels.

The leaves of this plant are usually about 5-20 cm long, and 2–8.5 cm wide.

== Description ==
As a whole this plant is shallowly cordate at the base, chartaceous, entire or with a few coarse teeth near the apex, drying dark above, olive brown with darker brown main veins below, the midvein impressed above and raised below.

The lateral veins plane above and prominent below, the tertiary venation prominulous below, densely minutely punctate above, glabrous except for a few trichomes along the main veins.
