= Rinorea abbreviata =

Conservation status
- Critically Endangered (IUCN 3.1)

Scientific classification
- Kingdom: Plantae
- Clade: Tracheophytes
- Clade: Angiosperms
- Clade: Eudicots
- Clade: Rosids
- Order: Malpighiales
- Family: Violaceae
- Genus: Rinorea
- Species: R. abbreviata

Binomial name
- Rinorea abbreviata Achound. & Bos

Species of plant

Rinorea abbreviata is a species of plant in the family Violaceae. It is endemic to Gabon. It is a tree and grows primarily in the wet tropical biome.
