= Scotura aeroptera =

Scientific classification
- Kingdom: Animalia
- Phylum: Arthropoda
- Clade: Pancrustacea
- Class: Insecta
- Order: Lepidoptera
- Superfamily: Noctuoidea
- Family: Notodontidae
- Genus: Scotura
- Species: S. aeroptera

Binomial name
- Scotura aeroptera Miller, 2008

Species of moth

Scotura aeroptera is a moth of the family Notodontidae. The length of the forewings is 12.5-13.0 mm for males and 15.5 mm for females. It is endemic to the Caribbean versant of the Cordillera Central in Costa Rica, where it inhabits lowland forests at elevations of 50–150 m (160–490 ft). Its caterpillars are known to feed on Genipa americana.

== Taxonomy ==
Scotura aeroptera was formally described by the American entomologist James S. Miller in 2008 based on a male collected from Heredia Province in Costa Rica. Its specific epithet is derived from the Latin and Greek words meaning "bronze-winged", alluding to the unique bronze hue this moth's forewing has.

== Description ==
The length of the forewings is 12.5-13.0 mm for males and 15.5 mm for females.

== Distribution and habitat ==
Scotura aeroptera is currently only known from Costa Rica, where it is found on the Caribbean versant of the Cordillera Central. It has been documented from La Selva Biological Station in Heredia Province and Cerro Cocori in Limón Province. It is a denizen of lowland forests and can be found within a few kilometers of the shore. It has been recorded at elevations of 50–150 m (160–490 ft).

Caterpillars are known to feed on Genipa americana in the family Rubiaceae and probably have a braoder range of hosts within that family. This moth is the only dioptine species known to feed on Genipa plants.
