= Scotura nigricaput =

Scientific classification
- Kingdom: Animalia
- Phylum: Arthropoda
- Clade: Pancrustacea
- Class: Insecta
- Order: Lepidoptera
- Superfamily: Noctuoidea
- Family: Notodontidae
- Genus: Scotura
- Species: S. nigricaput

Binomial name
- Scotura nigricaput Dognin, 1923

Synonyms
- Scotura soror Hering, 1925

Species of moth

Scotura nigricaput is a moth of the family Notodontidae. It is found in Brazil.
