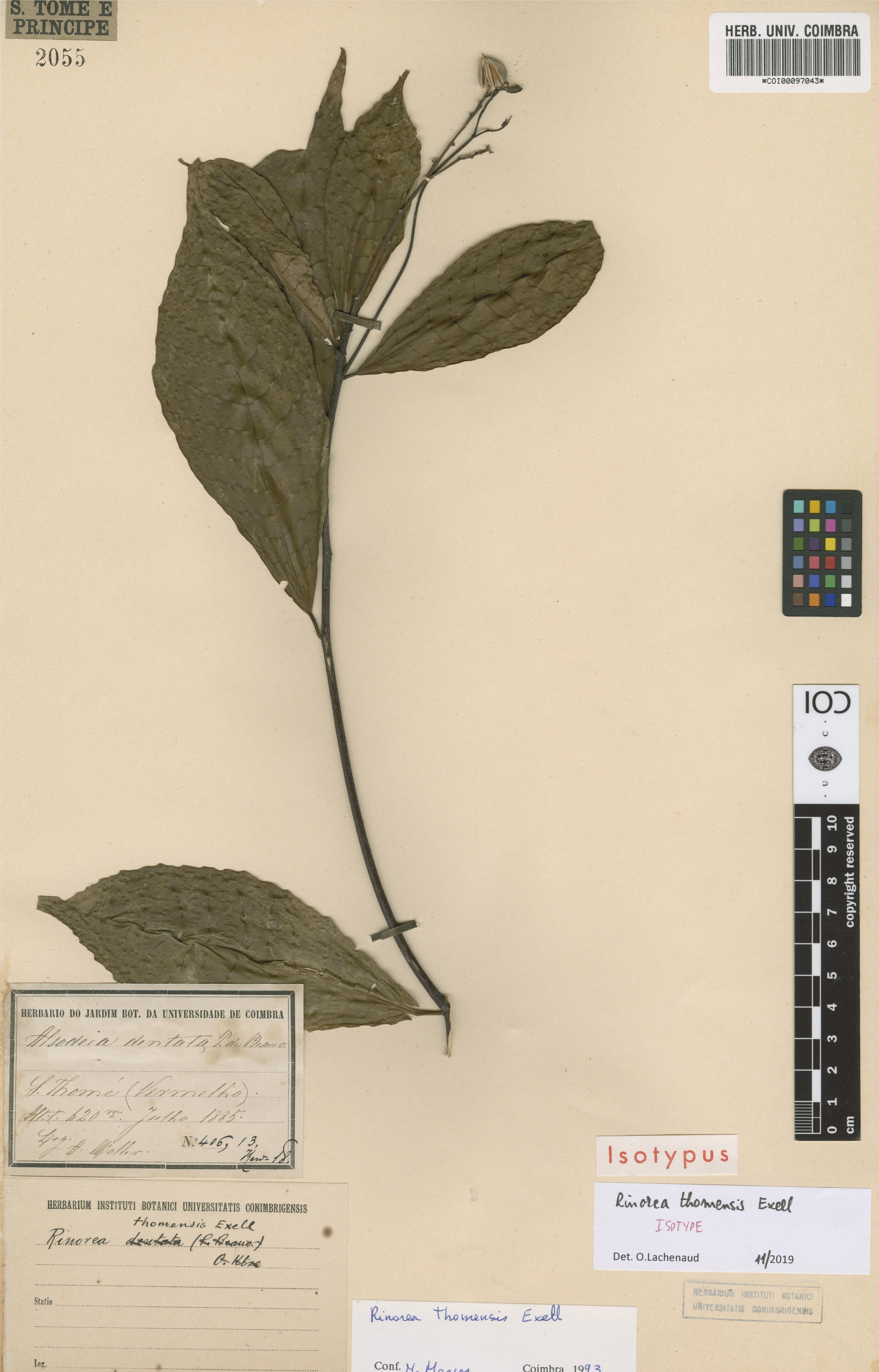
- Photograph of Isotype of Rinorea thomensis at Herbarium of the University of Coimbra, Portugal (COI). Specimen COI00097043

Conservation status
- Vulnerable (IUCN 2.3)

Scientific classification
- Kingdom: Plantae
- Clade: Tracheophytes
- Clade: Angiosperms
- Clade: Eudicots
- Clade: Rosids
- Order: Malpighiales
- Family: Violaceae
- Genus: Rinorea
- Species: R. thomensis

Binomial name
- Rinorea thomensis Exell

= Rinorea thomensis =

Species of flowering plant

Rinorea thomensis is a species of plant in the Violaceae family. It is endemic to São Tomé Island.
