= Scotura signata =

Scientific classification
- Kingdom: Animalia
- Phylum: Arthropoda
- Clade: Pancrustacea
- Class: Insecta
- Order: Lepidoptera
- Superfamily: Noctuoidea
- Family: Notodontidae
- Genus: Scotura
- Species: S. signata

Binomial name
- Scotura signata Hering, 1925

Species of moth

Scotura signata is a moth of the family Notodontidae. It is found in Brazil and Peru.
