= Ophiocaryon =

Scientific classification
- Kingdom: Plantae
- Clade: Tracheophytes
- Clade: Angiosperms
- Clade: Eudicots
- Order: Proteales
- Family: Sabiaceae
- Genus: Ophiocaryon; Endl.

Species
- See text

Synonyms
- Phoxanthus Benth.

Genus of flowering plants

Ophiocaryon is a small genus of flowering plants in the family Sabiaceae found mainly in the Guayana Shield and Amazon basin in South America.

== Species ==
- Ophiocaryon neillii Aymard & Daly (Ecuador)
- Ophiocaryon klugii Barneby (Brazil, Colombia, Peru)
- Ophiocaryon heterophyllum (Benth.) Urban (Brazil, Colombia, Ecuador, Peru)
- Ophiocaryon chironectes Barneby (Brazil-Guyana border
- Ophiocaryon duckei Barneby (Brazil, Peru
- Ophiocaryon paradoxum R. Schomburgk (Guyana)
- Ophiocaryon maguirei Barneby (Guyana)
