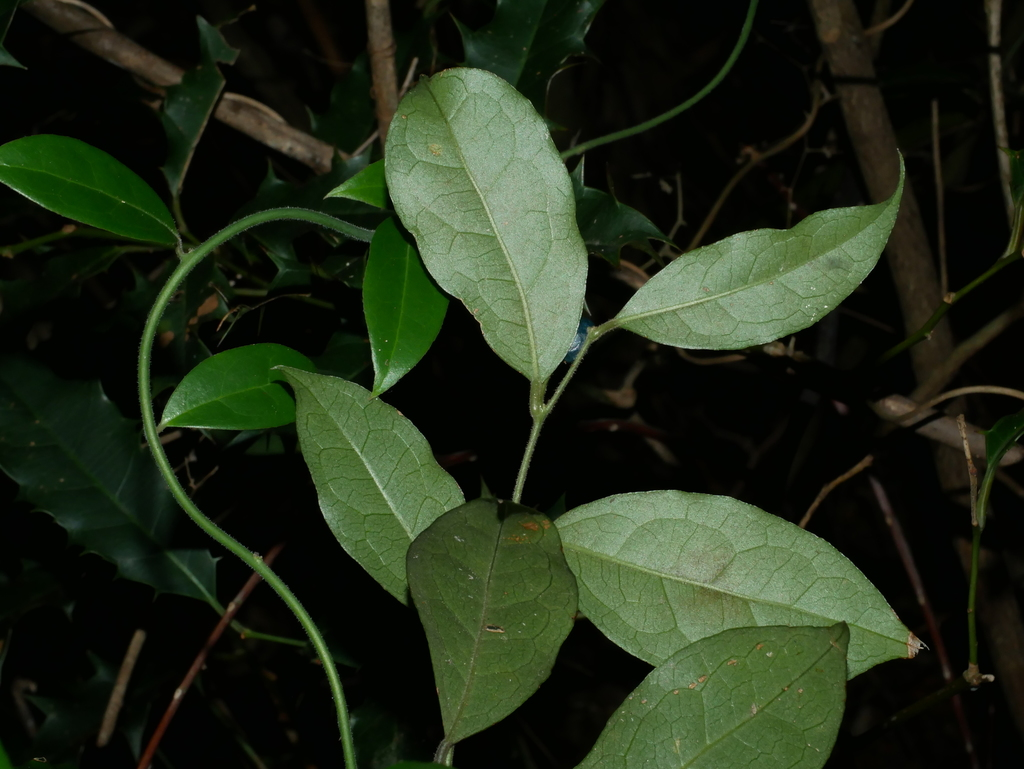

Scientific classification
- Kingdom: Plantae
- Clade: Tracheophytes
- Clade: Angiosperms
- Clade: Eudicots
- Order: Proteales
- Family: Sabiaceae
- Genus: Sabia
- Species: S. swinhoei

Binomial name
- Sabia swinhoei Hemsl. ex Forbes & Hemsl. (1886).

= Sabia swinhoei =

Species of plant

Sabia swinhoei, known as Swinhoe's sabia, is a species that belongs to the Sabia genus in the family Sabiaceae. It was first published as a new species in Taiwan in 1886.

== Discovery ==
R. Swinhoe collected the species in Taiwan in 1862. In 1886, William Botting Hemsley (1843-1924), a British botanist, published the specimen as a new species. The holotype specimen is preserved in the Royal Botanic Garden, Kew, UK.

== Distribution ==
The plant can be found in northern Taiwan, in mountain forests at an altitude of 400 to 2300 meters.

== Description ==
A climbing vine with long runners, entire plant pubescence. The stem can reach 4 to 5 m (13 to 16 ft) in length and is often branched. Alternating elliptical leaves, 6 to 10 cm (2.4 to 3.9 in) in length and 2 to 3.5 cm (0.79 to 1.38 in) in width, with an acute apex and ovate base. The leaves are entire and coriaceous. The adaxial surface is green, conduplicate, with pubescent in the midrib, while the abaxial surface is lighter in color, cucullate, and pilose. Four lateral veins and fine veins are present on each side. The petiole is 0.2 to 0.5 cm (0.079 to 0.197 in) in length.

The flowers are small and arranged in cymes of 3, axillary, with a diameter of 0.6 to 0.8 cm (0.24 to 0.31 in) when open. The pedicel is hairy and slender, approximately 2 to 3 cm (0.79 to 1.18 in) in length, with 2 bracts in the center. The calyx is imbricate with 5 ovate lobes, acute at the apex and hairy at the front. There are 5 opposite ovate, hairy, petals with an acute apex and an acuminate back. The number of petals is the same as the number of stamens, with sider filaments. The anthers are sparsely hairy at the front. The disk is annular with indistinct lobules. The ovary is bilocular, glabrous, and smooth. The fruit is a globose drupe, 0.8 to 0.9 cm (0.31 to 0.35 in) in diameter, blue-black when mature. The flowering period is from March to April while the fruiting period is from July to September.
