= Scotura nervosa =

Scientific classification
- Kingdom: Animalia
- Phylum: Arthropoda
- Clade: Pancrustacea
- Class: Insecta
- Order: Lepidoptera
- Superfamily: Noctuoidea
- Family: Notodontidae
- Genus: Scotura
- Species: S. nervosa

Binomial name
- Scotura nervosa Schaus, 1896

Synonyms
- Scotura distincta Hering, 1925; Scotura peruviana Hering, 1925; Scotura retracta Hering, 1925

Species of moth

Scotura nervosa is a moth of the family Notodontidae. It is found in Venezuela, Colombia, Ecuador, Bolivia and Brazil.
