= Rinorea endotricha =

Conservation status
- Least Concern (IUCN 3.1)

Scientific classification
- Kingdom: Plantae
- Clade: Embryophytes
- Clade: Tracheophytes
- Clade: Spermatophytes
- Clade: Angiosperms
- Clade: Eudicots
- Clade: Rosids
- Order: Malpighiales
- Family: Violaceae
- Genus: Rinorea
- Species: R. endotricha

Binomial name
- Rinorea endotricha Sandwith

Species of flowering plant

Rinorea endotricha is a species of plant in the Violaceae family. It is found in Guyana and Venezuela.
