= Rinorea haughtii =

Conservation status
- Near Threatened (IUCN 3.1)

Scientific classification
- Kingdom: Plantae
- Clade: Tracheophytes
- Clade: Angiosperms
- Clade: Eudicots
- Clade: Rosids
- Order: Malpighiales
- Family: Violaceae
- Genus: Rinorea
- Species: R. haughtii

Binomial name
- Rinorea haughtii Smith & Fernández

Species of flowering plant

Rinorea haughtii is a species of plant in the Violaceae family. It is endemic to Colombia.
