= Scotura flavicapilla =

Scientific classification
- Kingdom: Animalia
- Phylum: Arthropoda
- Clade: Pancrustacea
- Class: Insecta
- Order: Lepidoptera
- Superfamily: Noctuoidea
- Family: Notodontidae
- Genus: Scotura
- Species: S. flavicapilla

Binomial name
- Scotura flavicapilla (Hübner, 1823)

Synonyms
- Atolmis flavicapilla Hubner 1823; Scotura pyraloides Walker, 1854; Brachyglene uniformis Moschler, 1877

Species of moth

Scotura flavicapilla is a moth of the family Notodontidae. It is found in French Guiana, Suriname, Guyana and Brazil.

The larvae feed on Rinorea macrocarpa.
