= Scotura fulviceps =

Scientific classification
- Kingdom: Animalia
- Phylum: Arthropoda
- Clade: Pancrustacea
- Class: Insecta
- Order: Lepidoptera
- Superfamily: Noctuoidea
- Family: Notodontidae
- Genus: Scotura
- Species: S. fulviceps

Binomial name
- Scotura fulviceps (C. Felder & R. Felder, 1874)

Synonyms
- Cymopsis fulviceps C. Felder & R. Felder, 1874; Pseuderbessa caresa Druce, 1885; Scotura distinguenda Prout, 1918

Species of moth

Scotura fulviceps is a moth of the family Notodontidae. It is found in Brazil, Guyana and Peru.
