= Scotura occidentalis =

Scientific classification
- Kingdom: Animalia
- Phylum: Arthropoda
- Clade: Pancrustacea
- Class: Insecta
- Order: Lepidoptera
- Superfamily: Noctuoidea
- Family: Notodontidae
- Genus: Scotura
- Species: S. occidentalis

Binomial name
- Scotura occidentalis Miller, 2008

Species of moth

Scotura occidentalis is a moth of the family Notodontidae. It is found in southern Ecuador.

The length of the forewings is 13–14 mm for males and 14 mm for females.
