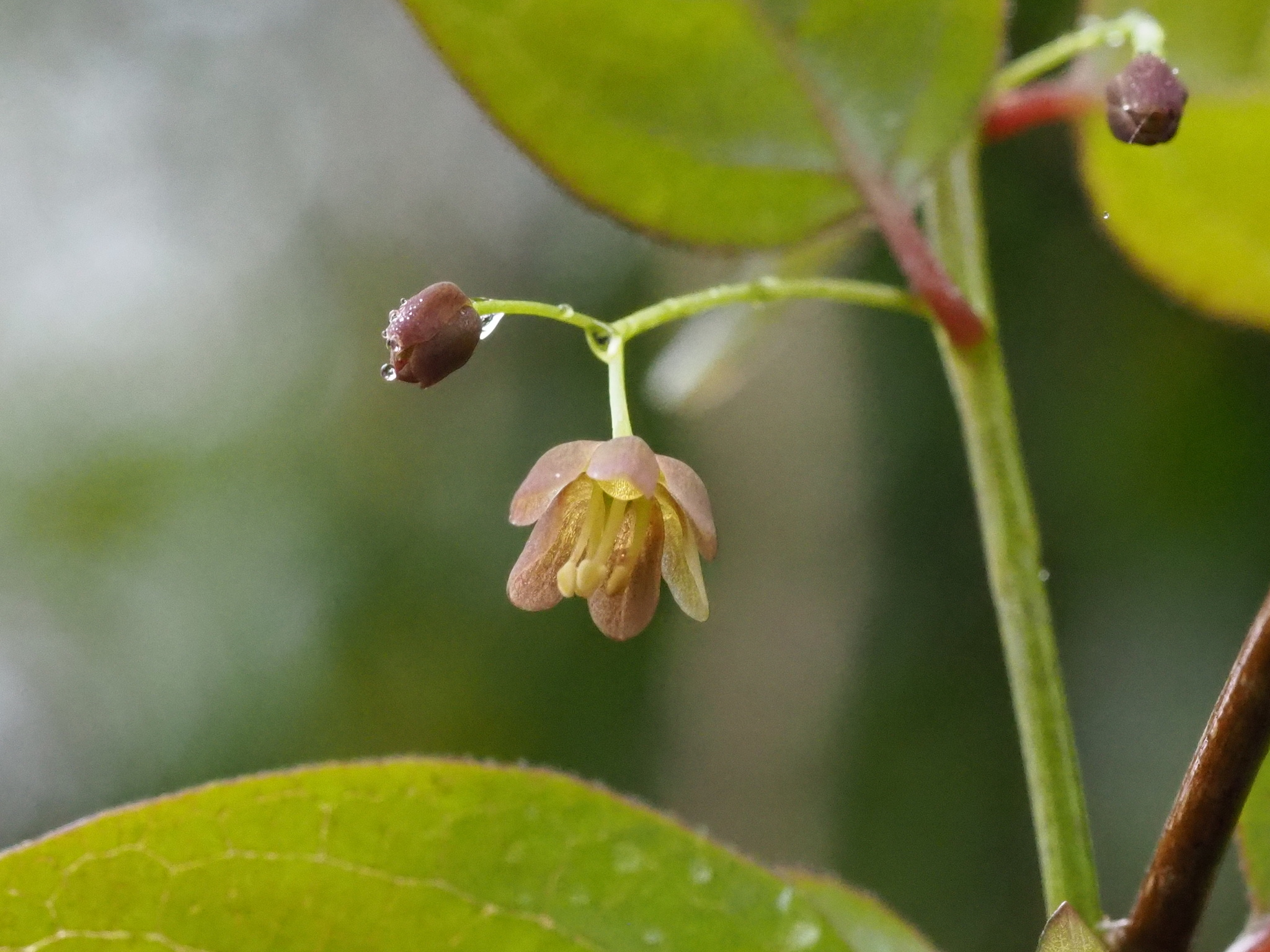
- Sabia transarisanensis

Scientific classification
- Kingdom: Plantae
- Clade: Tracheophytes
- Clade: Angiosperms
- Clade: Eudicots
- Order: Proteales
- Family: Sabiaceae
- Genus: Sabia; Colebr.

= Sabia (plant) =

Genus of plants

Sabia is a genus of flowering plants in the family Sabiaceae. It is native to Asia.

== Taxonomy ==
Sabia contains the following species:

- Sabia burmanica Water
- Sabia campanulata Wall.
- Sabia coriacea Rehder & E.H.Wilson
- Sabia dielsii H.Lév.
- Sabia discolor Dunn
- Sabia emarginata Lecomte
- Sabia erratica Water
- Sabia falcata L.Chen
- Sabia fasciculata Lecomte ex L.Chen
- Sabia japonica Maxim.
- Sabia javanica (Blume) Backer ex L.Chen
- Sabia lanceolata Colebr.
- Sabia limoniacea Wall. ex Hook.f. & Thomson
- Sabia nervosa Chun ex Y.F.Wu
- Sabia paniculata Edgew. ex Hook.f. & Thomson
- Sabia parviflora Wall.
- Sabia pauciflora Blume
- Sabia purpurea Hook.f. & Thomson
- Sabia racemosa L.Chen
- Sabia schumanniana Diels
- Sabia sumatrana Blume
- Sabia swinhoei Hemsl.
- Sabia tomentosa Hook.f.
- Sabia transarisanensis Hayata
- Sabia wardii W.W.Sm.
- Sabia yunnanensis Franch.
