= Rinorea marginata =

Conservation status
- Endangered (IUCN 3.1)

Scientific classification
- Kingdom: Plantae
- Clade: Tracheophytes
- Clade: Angiosperms
- Clade: Eudicots
- Clade: Rosids
- Order: Malpighiales
- Family: Violaceae
- Genus: Rinorea
- Species: R. marginata

Binomial name
- Rinorea marginata (Triana & Planchon) Rusby ex Johnston

Species of flowering plant

Rinorea marginata is a species of plant in the Violaceae family. It is endemic to Colombia.
