= Rinorea villosiflora =

Conservation status
- Endangered (IUCN 2.3)

Scientific classification
- Kingdom: Plantae
- Clade: Tracheophytes
- Clade: Angiosperms
- Clade: Eudicots
- Clade: Rosids
- Order: Malpighiales
- Family: Violaceae
- Genus: Rinorea
- Species: R. villosiflora

Binomial name
- Rinorea villosiflora Hekking

Species of flowering plant

Rinorea villosiflora is a species of plant in the family Violaceae. It is endemic to Brazil.
