= Scotura delineata =

Scientific classification
- Kingdom: Animalia
- Phylum: Arthropoda
- Clade: Pancrustacea
- Class: Insecta
- Order: Lepidoptera
- Superfamily: Noctuoidea
- Family: Notodontidae
- Genus: Scotura
- Species: S. delineata

Binomial name
- Scotura delineata Dognin, 1923

Species of moth

Scotura delineata is a moth of the family Notodontidae. It is found in Brazil.
