= Scotura intermedia =

Scientific classification
- Kingdom: Animalia
- Phylum: Arthropoda
- Clade: Pancrustacea
- Class: Insecta
- Order: Lepidoptera
- Superfamily: Noctuoidea
- Family: Notodontidae
- Genus: Scotura
- Species: S. intermedia

Binomial name
- Scotura intermedia Warren, 1909

Species of moth

Scotura intermedia is a moth of the family Notodontidae. It is found in Suriname, French Guiana, Guyana and Brazil.
