= Scotura transversa =

Scientific classification
- Kingdom: Animalia
- Phylum: Arthropoda
- Clade: Pancrustacea
- Class: Insecta
- Order: Lepidoptera
- Superfamily: Noctuoidea
- Family: Notodontidae
- Genus: Scotura
- Species: S. transversa

Binomial name
- Scotura transversa (Warren, 1906)

Synonyms
- Stenoplastis transversa Warren, 1906

Species of moth

Scotura transversa is a moth of the family Notodontidae. It is found in French Guiana, Suriname and Guyana.
