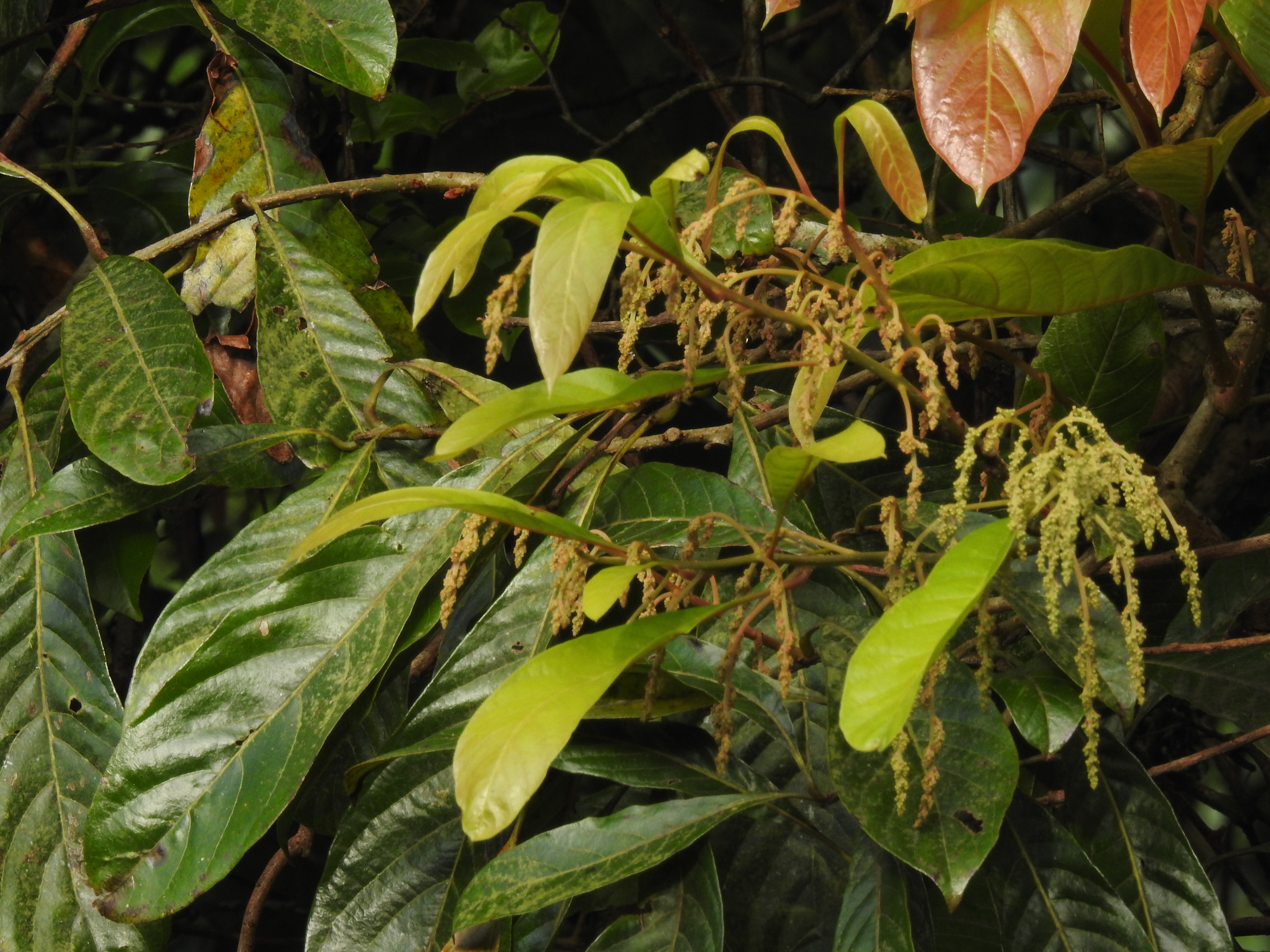

Scientific classification
- Kingdom: Plantae
- Clade: Tracheophytes
- Clade: Angiosperms
- Clade: Eudicots
- Order: Proteales
- Family: Sabiaceae
- Genus: Meliosma
- Species: M. simplicifolia

Binomial name
- Meliosma simplicifolia (Roxb.) Walp.

= Meliosma simplicifolia =

Species of flowering plant

Meliosma simplicifolia is a species of plant in the family Sabiaceae. It is widely distributed in Asia from India through south-east Asia.

== Gallery ==
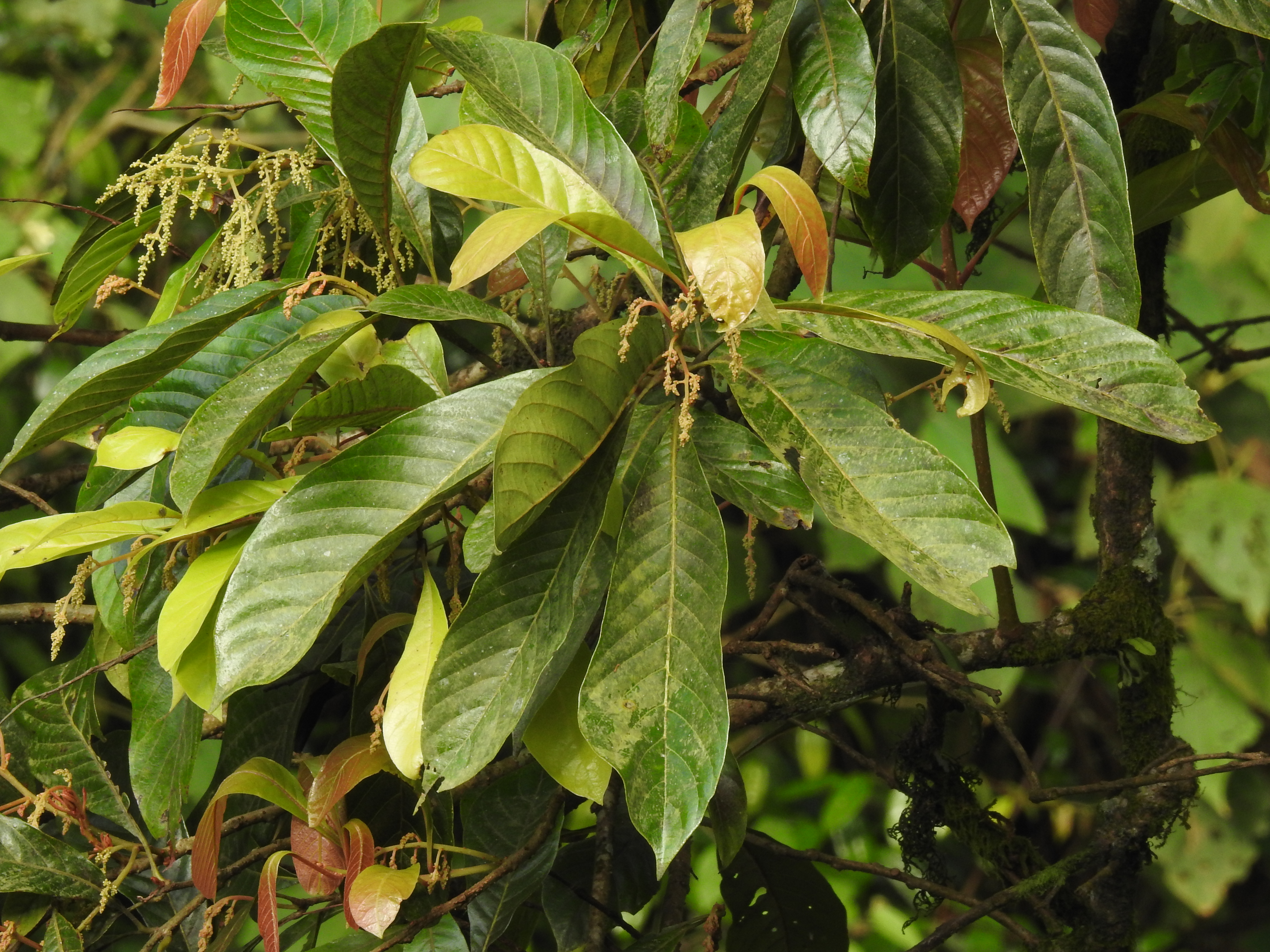
Flowering branch and mature leaves

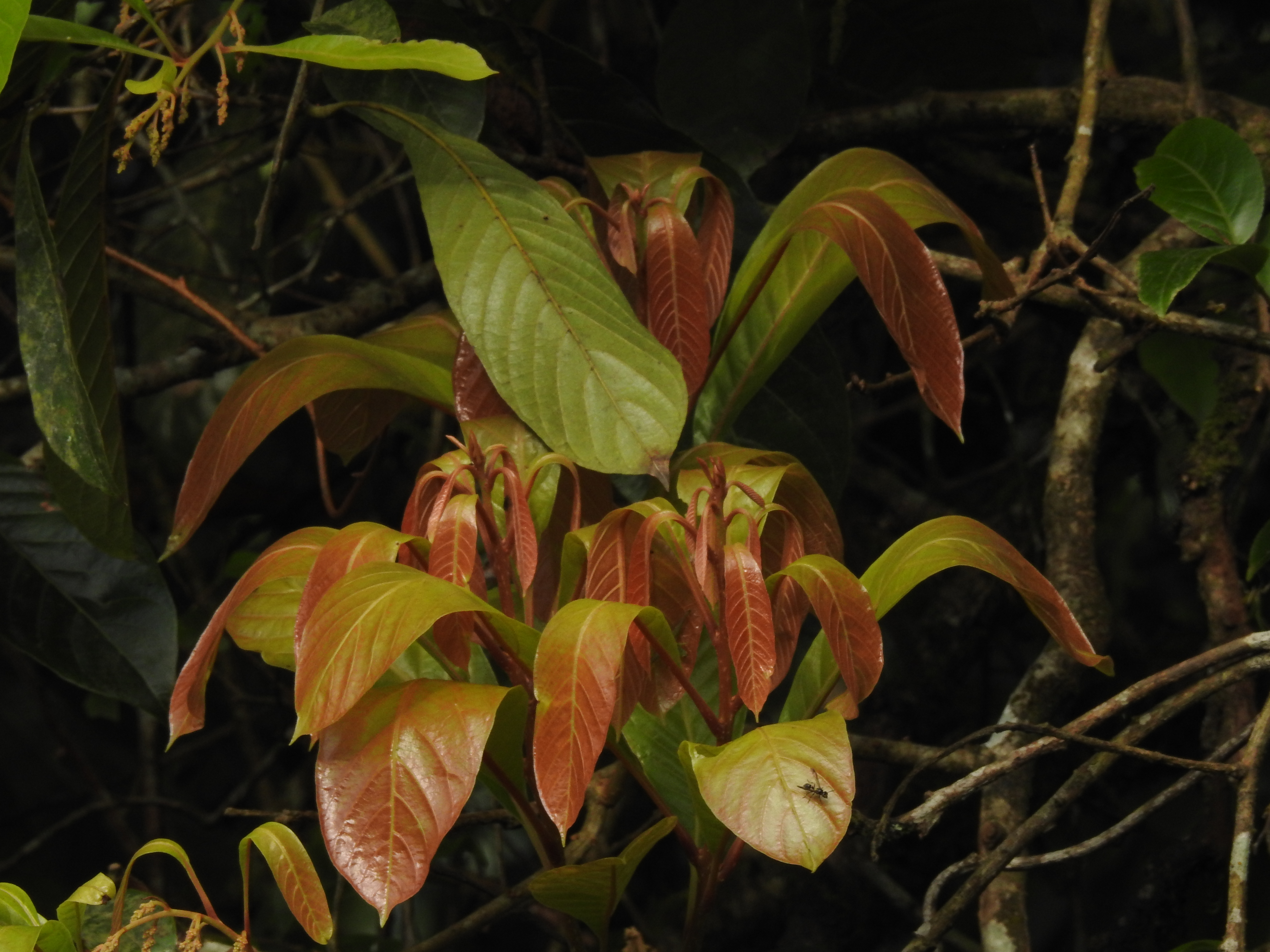
Young leaves

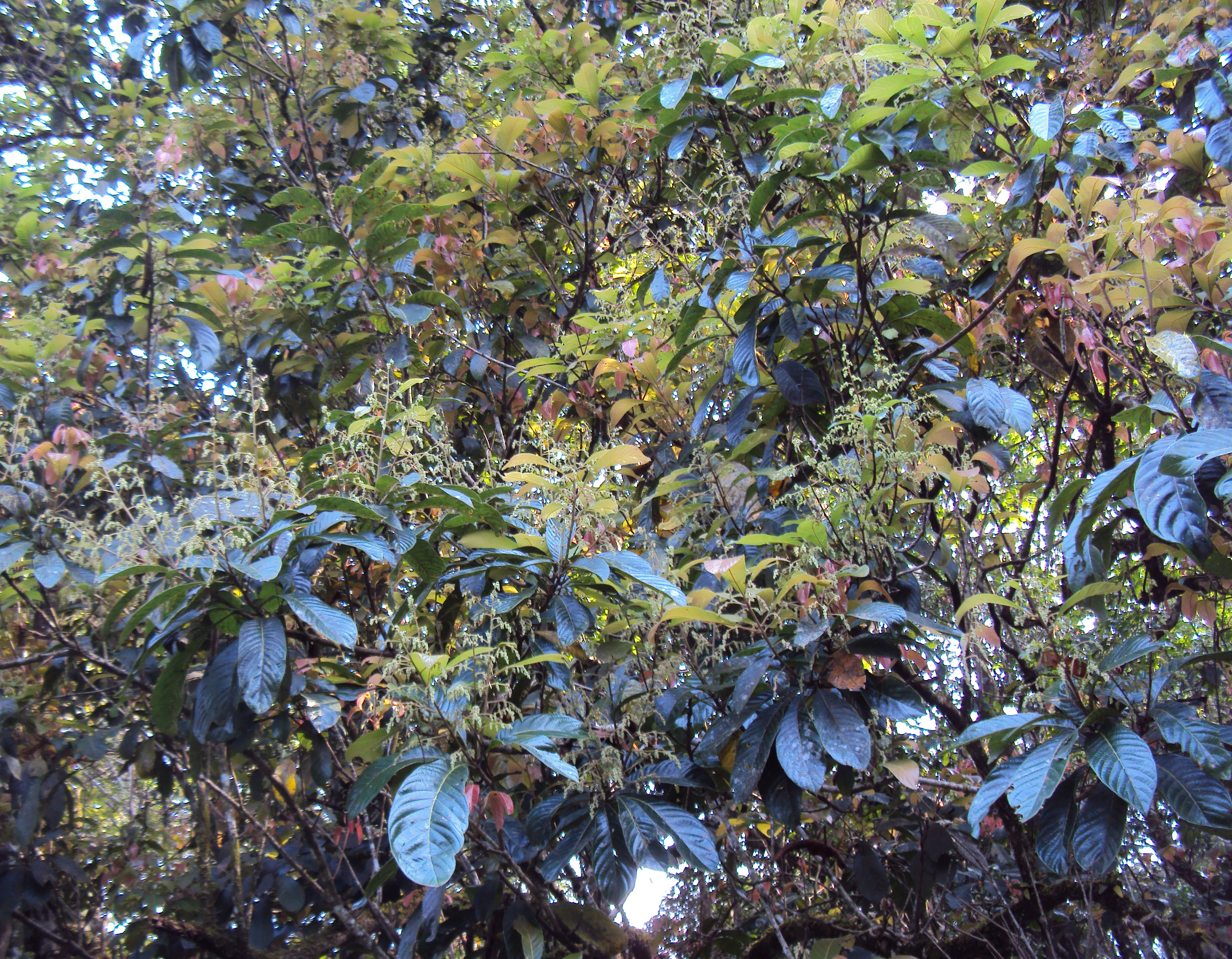
Flowering tree

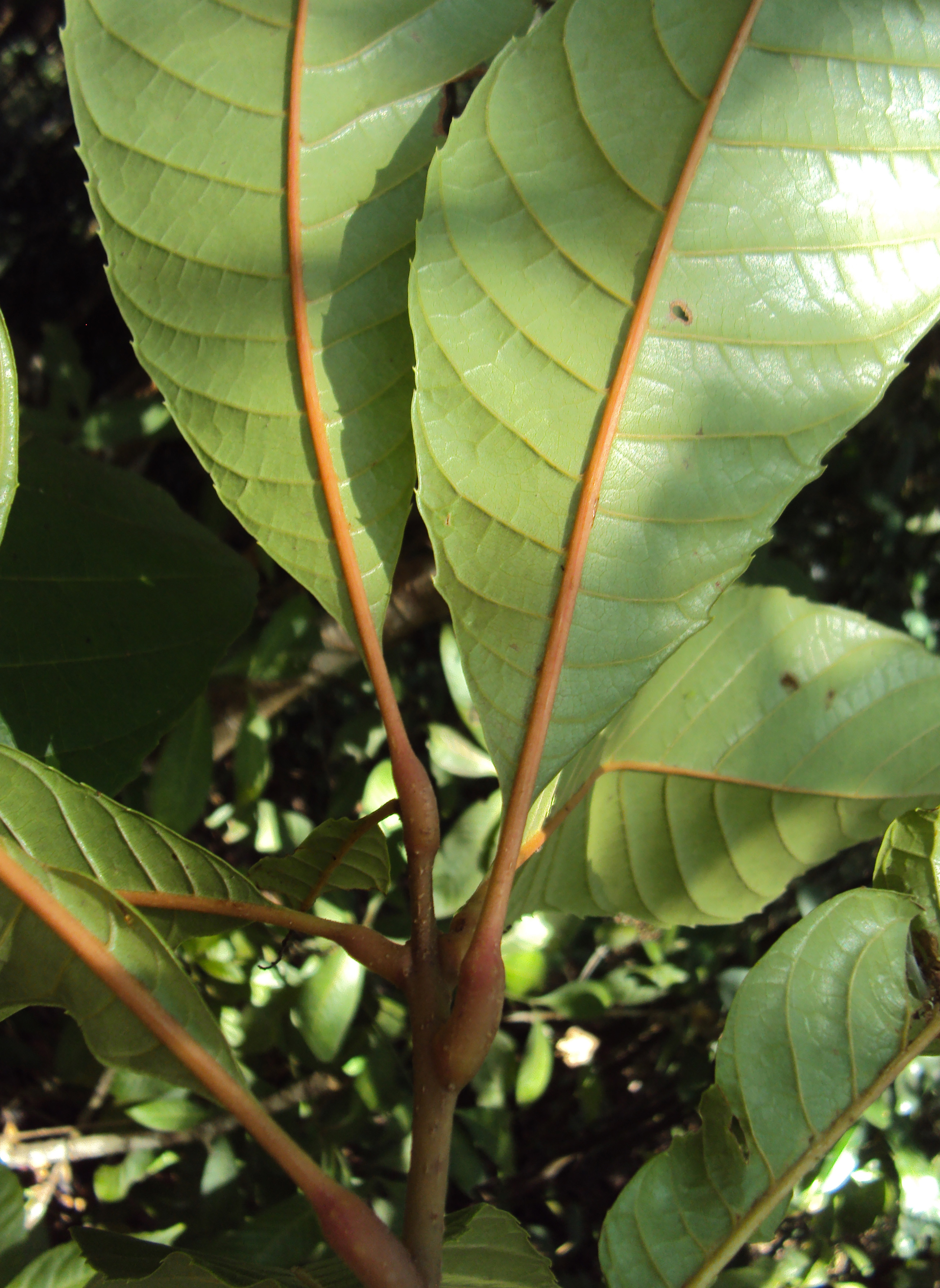
Underside of leaves

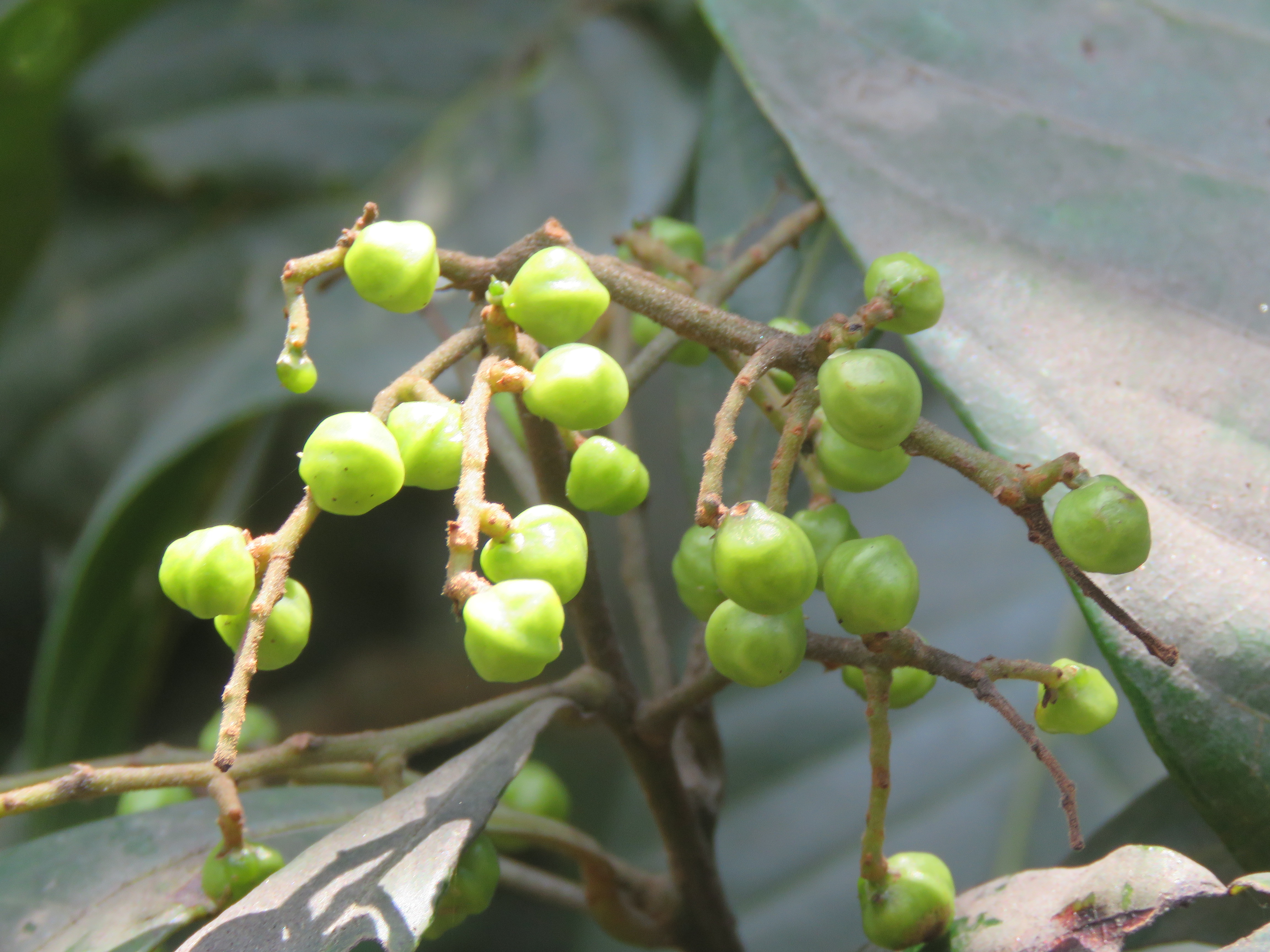
Unripe fruits
