= Rinorea keayi =

Conservation status
- Near Threatened (IUCN 2.3)

Scientific classification
- Kingdom: Plantae
- Clade: Tracheophytes
- Clade: Angiosperms
- Clade: Eudicots
- Clade: Rosids
- Order: Malpighiales
- Family: Violaceae
- Genus: Rinorea
- Species: R. keayi

Binomial name
- Rinorea keayi Brenan

Species of flowering plant

Rinorea keayi is a species of plant in the Violaceae family. It is found in Cameroon and Nigeria. It is threatened by habitat loss.
