= Rinorea acutidens =

Scientific classification
- Kingdom: Plantae
- Clade: Tracheophytes
- Clade: Angiosperms
- Clade: Eudicots
- Clade: Rosids
- Order: Malpighiales
- Family: Violaceae
- Genus: Rinorea
- Species: R. acutidens

Binomial name
- Rinorea acutidens M.Brandt

Species of plant

Rinorea acutidens is a species of plant in the family Violaceae. It is endemic to Cameroon.
