= Rinorea guatemalensis =

Conservation status
- Least Concern (IUCN 3.1)

Scientific classification
- Kingdom: Plantae
- Clade: Tracheophytes
- Clade: Angiosperms
- Clade: Eudicots
- Clade: Rosids
- Order: Malpighiales
- Family: Violaceae
- Genus: Rinorea
- Species: R. guatemalensis

Binomial name
- Rinorea guatemalensis (S.Watson) Bartlett

Species of plant

Rinorea guatemalensis is a species of plant in the family Violaceae. Its native range is from Central Mexico to Central America. It is a tree and grows primarily in the wet tropical biome.
