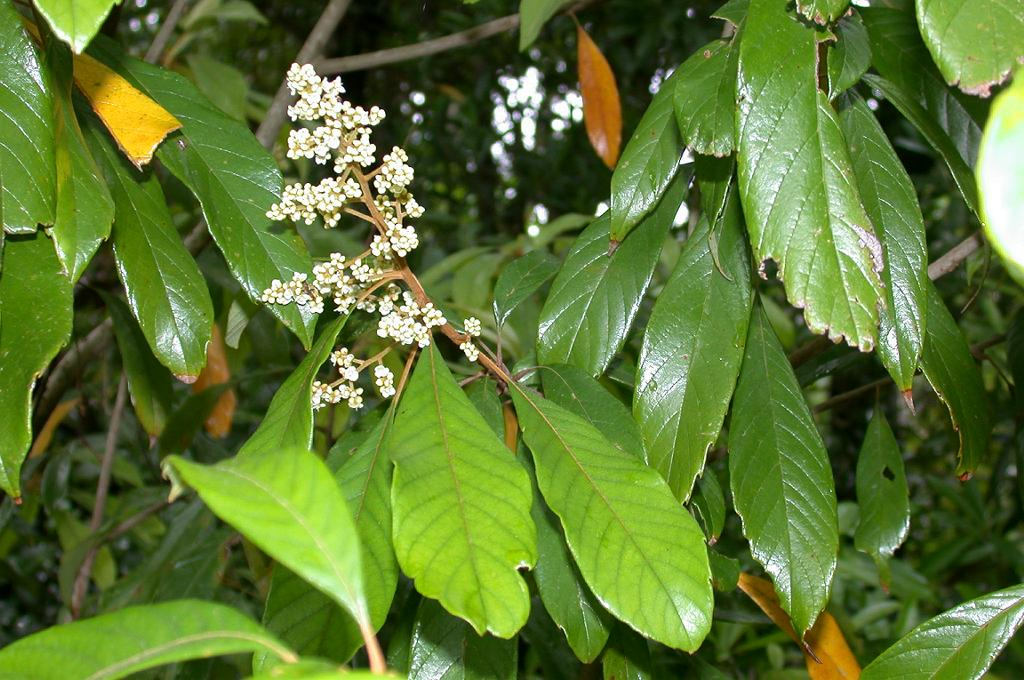
- In the wild in Japan

Scientific classification
- Kingdom: Plantae
- Clade: Embryophytes
- Clade: Tracheophytes
- Clade: Spermatophytes
- Clade: Angiosperms
- Clade: Eudicots
- Order: Proteales
- Family: Sabiaceae
- Genus: Meliosma
- Species: M. rigida

Binomial name
- Meliosma rigida Siebold & Zucc.

Synonyms
- List: Meliosma evrardii Gagnep.; Meliosma glomerulata Rehder & E.H.Wilson; Meliosma harmandiana Pierre; Meliosma loheri Merr.; Meliosma pannosa Hand.-Mazz.; Meliosma patens Hemsl.; Meliosma simplicifolia subsp. rigida (Siebold & Zucc.) Beusekom

= Meliosma rigida =

Species of flowering plant

Meliosma rigida, the stiff-leaved meliosma, is a species of flowering plant in the family Sabiaceae. It is native to Laos, Vietnam, southern China, Taiwan, Japan, the Ryukyu Islands, and the Philippines.

== Subtaxa ==
The following varieties are accepted:

- Meliosma rigida var. pannosa (Hand.-Mazz.) Y.W.Law
- Meliosma rigida var. rigida
