= Rinorea maximiliani =

Conservation status
- Critically Endangered (IUCN 2.3)

Scientific classification
- Kingdom: Plantae
- Clade: Tracheophytes
- Clade: Angiosperms
- Clade: Eudicots
- Clade: Rosids
- Order: Malpighiales
- Family: Violaceae
- Genus: Rinorea
- Species: R. maximiliani

Binomial name
- Rinorea maximiliani (Eichler) Kuntze

Synonyms
- Alsodeia maximiliani Eichler

Species of flowering plant

Rinorea maximiliani is a species of plant in the Violaceae family. It is a shrub or tree endemic to Espírito Santo state in southeastern Brazil.
