= Rinorea fausteana =

Conservation status
- Endangered (IUCN 3.1)

Scientific classification
- Kingdom: Plantae
- Clade: Tracheophytes
- Clade: Angiosperms
- Clade: Eudicots
- Clade: Rosids
- Order: Malpighiales
- Family: Violaceae
- Genus: Rinorea
- Species: R. fausteana

Binomial name
- Rinorea fausteana Achoundong

Species of flowering plant

Rinorea fausteana is a species of plant in the Violaceae family. It is endemic to Cameroon. Its natural habitats are subtropical or tropical moist lowland forests and subtropical or tropical moist montane forests. It is threatened by habitat loss.
