= Rinorea hummelii =

Conservation status
- Least Concern (IUCN 3.1)

Scientific classification
- Kingdom: Plantae
- Clade: Tracheophytes
- Clade: Angiosperms
- Clade: Eudicots
- Clade: Rosids
- Order: Malpighiales
- Family: Violaceae
- Genus: Rinorea
- Species: R. hummelii

Binomial name
- Rinorea hummelii Sprague

Species of plant

Rinorea hummelii is a species of plant in the family Violaceae. The native range of the species is from South Mexico to Central America.
