= Bribria apiculata =

Conservation status
- Least Concern (IUCN 3.1)

Scientific classification
- Kingdom: Plantae
- Clade: Tracheophytes
- Clade: Angiosperms
- Clade: Eudicots
- Clade: Rosids
- Order: Malpighiales
- Family: Violaceae
- Genus: Bribria
- Species: B. apiculata

Binomial name
- Bribria apiculata (Hekking) Wahlert & H.E.Ballard

Synonyms
- Rinorea apiculata Hekking

Species of flowering plant

Bribria apiculata is a species of flowering plant in the Violaceae family. Its native range is western South America and the north of Brazil.
