= Scotura =

Scientific classification
- Kingdom: Animalia
- Phylum: Arthropoda
- Clade: Pancrustacea
- Class: Insecta
- Order: Lepidoptera
- Superfamily: Noctuoidea
- Family: Notodontidae
- Tribe: Dioptini
- Genus: Scotura; Walker, 1854

Synonyms
- Cymopsis C. and R. Felder, 1874; Zunacetha Walker, 1863

Genus of moths

Scotura is a genus of moths of the family Notodontidae. It consists of the following species:

- annulata species group:
  - Scotura aeroptera Miller, 2008
  - Scotura annulata (Guérin-Ménéville, 1844)
  - Scotura bugabensis (Druce, 1895)
- auriceps species group:
  - Scotura atelozona Prout, 1918
  - Scotura auriceps Butler, 1878
  - Scotura contracta Dognin, 1923
  - Scotura delineata Dognin, 1923
  - Scotura longigutta Warren, 1909
  - Scotura nigrata Warren, 1906
  - Scotura nigricaput Dognin, 1923
  - Scotura transversa (Warren, 1906)
  - Scotura vestigiata Prout, 1918
- flavicapilla species group:
  - Scotura abstracta Prout, 1918
  - Scotura flavicapilla (Hübner, 1823)
  - Scotura fulviceps (C. and R. Felder, 1874)
  - Scotura fusciceps Warren, 1909
  - Scotura intermedia Warren, 1909
  - Scotura leucophleps Warren, 1909
  - Scotura nervosa Schaus, 1896
  - Scotura niveilimba Miller, 2008
  - Scotura occidentalis Miller, 2008
  - Scotura quadripuncta Miller, 2008
  - Scotura signata Hering, 1925
  - Scotura venata (Butler, 1877)
