= Scotura fusciceps =

Scientific classification
- Kingdom: Animalia
- Phylum: Arthropoda
- Clade: Pancrustacea
- Class: Insecta
- Order: Lepidoptera
- Superfamily: Noctuoidea
- Family: Notodontidae
- Genus: Scotura
- Species: S. fusciceps

Binomial name
- Scotura fusciceps Warren, 1909

Synonyms
- Scotura obstructa Warren, 1909

Species of moth

Scotura fusciceps is a moth of the family Notodontidae. It is found in Brazil, French Guiana and Guyana.
