= Scotura quadripuncta =

Scientific classification
- Kingdom: Animalia
- Phylum: Arthropoda
- Clade: Pancrustacea
- Class: Insecta
- Order: Lepidoptera
- Superfamily: Noctuoidea
- Family: Notodontidae
- Genus: Scotura
- Species: S. quadripuncta

Binomial name
- Scotura quadripuncta Miller, 2008

Species of moth

Scotura quadripuncta is a moth of the family Notodontidae. It is found in Amazonian Brazil and southern Venezuela. The length of the forewings is 12 mm for males and 13.5–14.0 mm for females. It has a pale steely gray-brown forewing with four white spots and a similarly colored hindwing with a large white oval at its center. It has been recorded from the two states of Amazonas, in both Brazil and Venezuela.

== Taxonomy ==
Scotura quadripuncta was first studied by Warren, who in 1909 called it an aberration belonging to the species S. fulviceps and gave it the name quadripuncta. This name was subsequently treated as a synonym of fulviceps until the American entomologist James S. Miller recognized it as a distinct species. Scotura quadripuncta was formally described by Miller in 2008 based on a male collected from Reserva Ducke in Manaus, Brazil. The specific epithet is derived from the Latin word meaning "four-spotted", alluding to the four spots on the moth's forewings.

== Description ==
The length of the forewings is 12 mm for males and 13.5–14.0 mm for females. The forewing is pale steely gray-brown with four white spots, two of which are beyond the discal cell. The hindwing is similarly colored to the forewing, but has a large white oval at its center. The undersides of both the hindwing and forewing are broadly similar to their dorsal surfaces.

Scotura quadripuncta is most similar in its appearance to S. fulviceps. It can be distinguished from the latter species by the presence of two spots on each forewing beyond the discal cell, instead of just one, and the presence of a thin white midventral line running down the underside of the abdomen.

== Distribution and habitat ==
Scotura quadripuncta is an exclusively Amazonian species, having been recorded from the Amazonas states of both Brazil and Venezuela.
