= Bribria =

Scientific classification
- Kingdom: Plantae
- Clade: Tracheophytes
- Clade: Angiosperms
- Clade: Eudicots
- Clade: Rosids
- Order: Malpighiales
- Family: Violaceae
- Genus: Bribria; Wahlert & H.E.Ballard

Genus of flowering plants

Bribria is a genus of flowering plants belonging to the family Violaceae.

Its native range is Central and Southern Tropical America.

Species:

- Bribria apiculata (Hekking) Wahlert & H.E.Ballard
- Bribria crenata (S.F.Blake) Wahlert & H.E.Ballard
- Bribria oraria (Steyerm. & A.Fernández) Wahlert & H.E.Ballard
