= Scotura bugabensis =

Scientific classification
- Kingdom: Animalia
- Phylum: Arthropoda
- Clade: Pancrustacea
- Class: Insecta
- Order: Lepidoptera
- Superfamily: Noctuoidea
- Family: Notodontidae
- Genus: Scotura
- Species: S. bugabensis

Binomial name
- Scotura bugabensis (Druce, 1895)

Synonyms
- Zunacetha bugabensis Druce, 1895; Stenoplastis albibasis Warren, 1907

Species of moth

Scotura bugabensis is a moth of the family Notodontidae first described by Druce in 1895. It is found from Costa Rica south to south-eastern Peru at elevations between 0 and 600 meters
