= Bribria crenata =

Conservation status
- Vulnerable (IUCN 3.1)

Scientific classification
- Kingdom: Plantae
- Clade: Tracheophytes
- Clade: Angiosperms
- Clade: Eudicots
- Clade: Rosids
- Order: Malpighiales
- Family: Violaceae
- Genus: Bribria
- Species: B. crenata

Binomial name
- Bribria crenata (S.F.Blake) Wahlert & H.E.Ballard (2018 publ. 2017)

Synonyms
- Rinorea crenata S.F.Blake (1924); Rinorea roureoides Woodson (1950)

Species of flowering plant

Bribria crenata is a species of flowering plant in the Violaceae family. It is found in Costa Rica and Panama.
