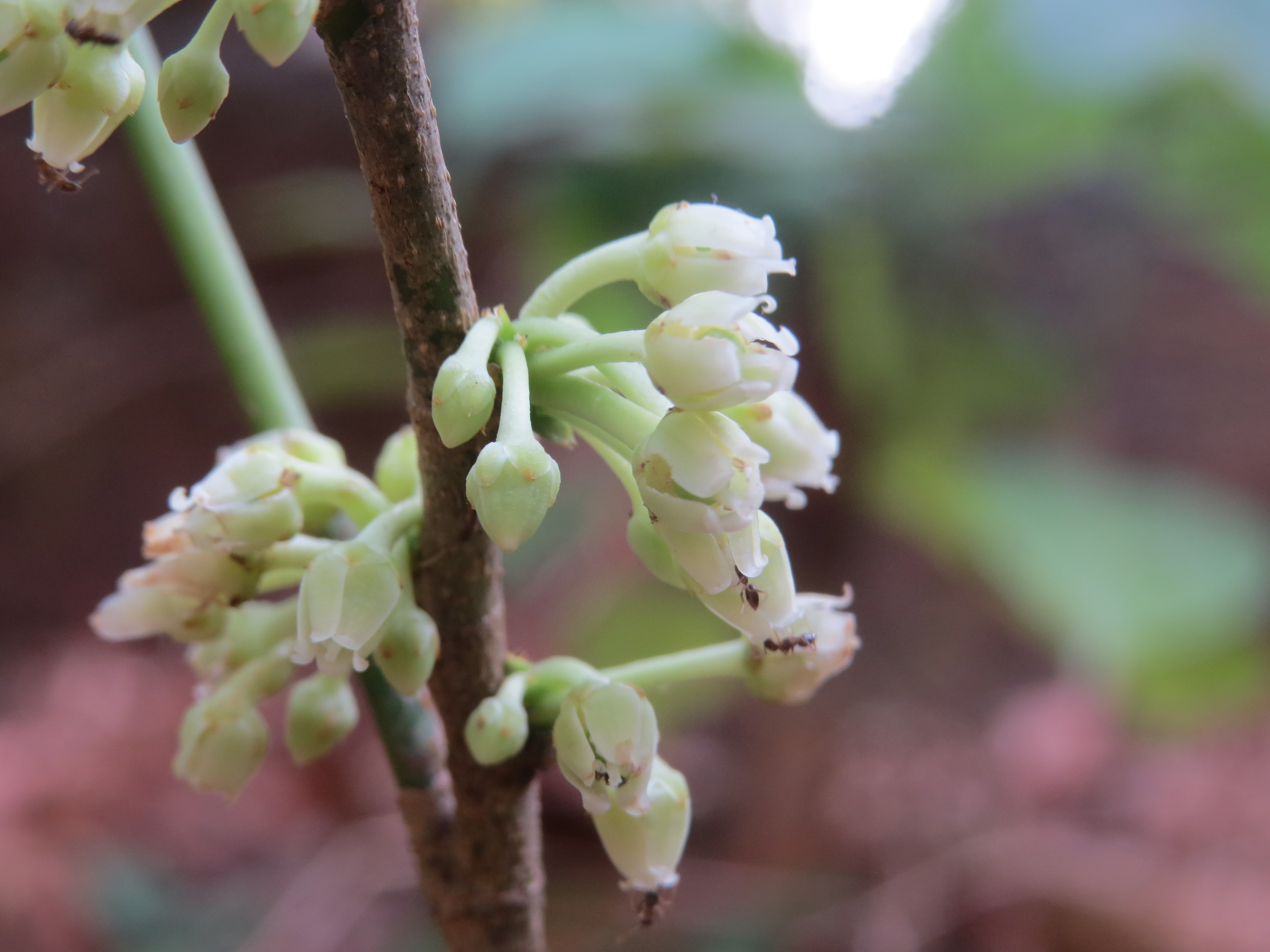
- Flowers at Peravoor

Conservation status
- Least Concern (IUCN 3.1)

Scientific classification
- Kingdom: Plantae
- Clade: Embryophytes
- Clade: Tracheophytes
- Clade: Spermatophytes
- Clade: Angiosperms
- Clade: Eudicots
- Clade: Rosids
- Order: Malpighiales
- Family: Violaceae
- Genus: Rinorea
- Species: R. bengalensis

Binomial name
- Rinorea bengalensis (Wall.) Kuntze

= Rinorea bengalensis =

Species of flowering plant

Rinorea bengalensis is a species of plant in the family Violaceae. They are seen as understorey trees in wet evergreen forests up to 800 metres (2,620 ft) in Indomalaya, Australia and Pacific Islands. In the Western Ghats they can be seen at Coorg and Chikmagalur districts.

Rinorea bengalensis contains a very high nickel concentrations for substances with low concentration of an element (e.g. 500 pg/g for plants growing over limestones). It has a hyperaccumulators of nickel with levels up to 1.8%.
