= Scotura venata =

Scientific classification
- Kingdom: Animalia
- Phylum: Arthropoda
- Clade: Pancrustacea
- Class: Insecta
- Order: Lepidoptera
- Superfamily: Noctuoidea
- Family: Notodontidae
- Genus: Scotura
- Species: S. venata

Binomial name
- Scotura venata (Butler, 1877)

Synonyms
- Stenoplastis venata Butler, 1877; Scotura discolor Warren, 1906

Species of moth

Scotura venata is a moth of the family Notodontidae. It is found in Brazil.
