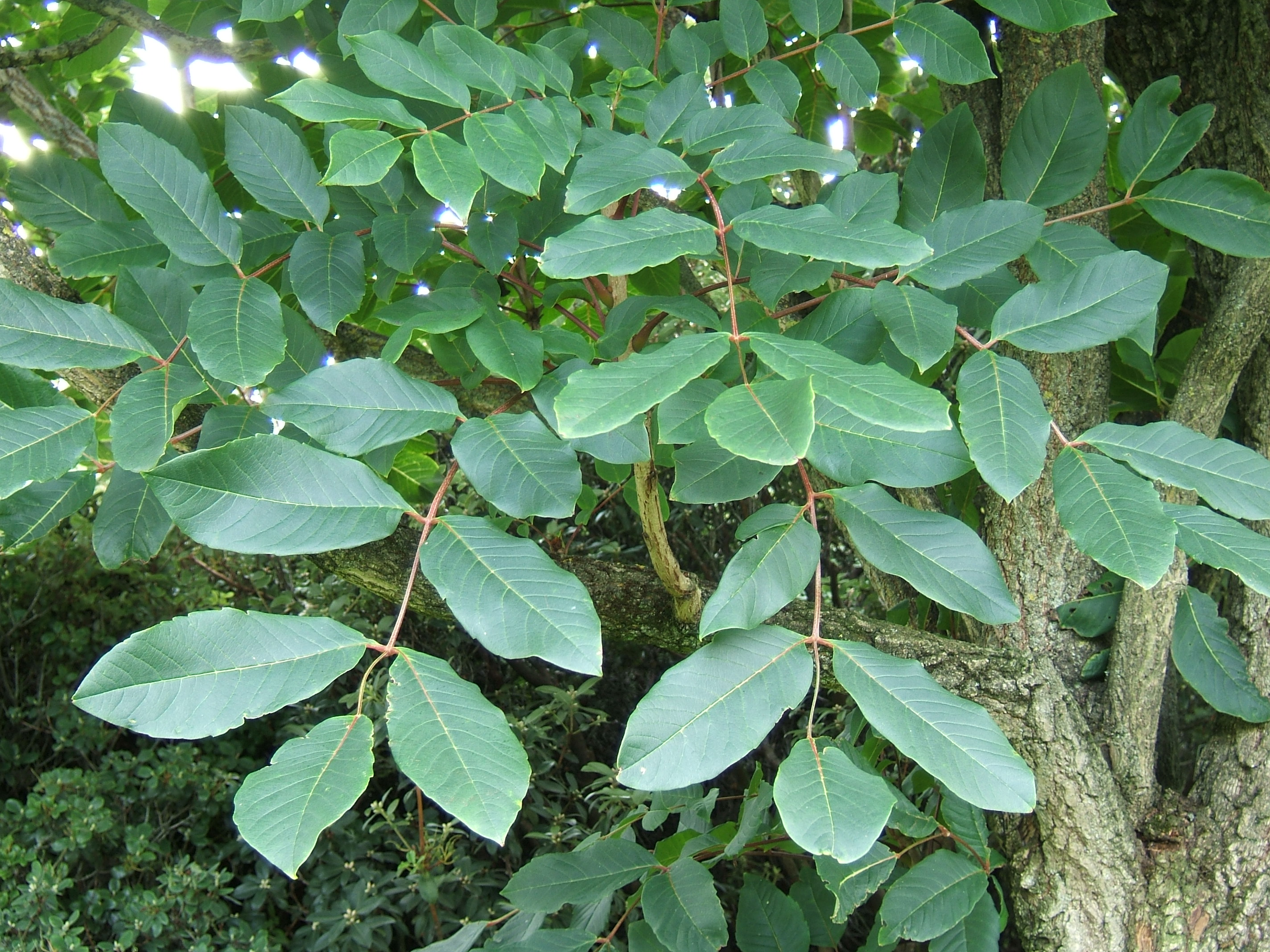
- Meliosma veitchiorum

Scientific classification
- Kingdom: Plantae
- Clade: Embryophytes
- Clade: Tracheophytes
- Clade: Angiosperms
- Clade: Eudicots
- Order: Proteales
- Family: Sabiaceae
- Genus: Meliosma; Blume

Species
- See text

Synonyms
- Millingtonia Roxb. Wellingtonia Meisn.

= Meliosma =

Meliosma Temporal range: Tiffanian–Present

Genus of flowering plants

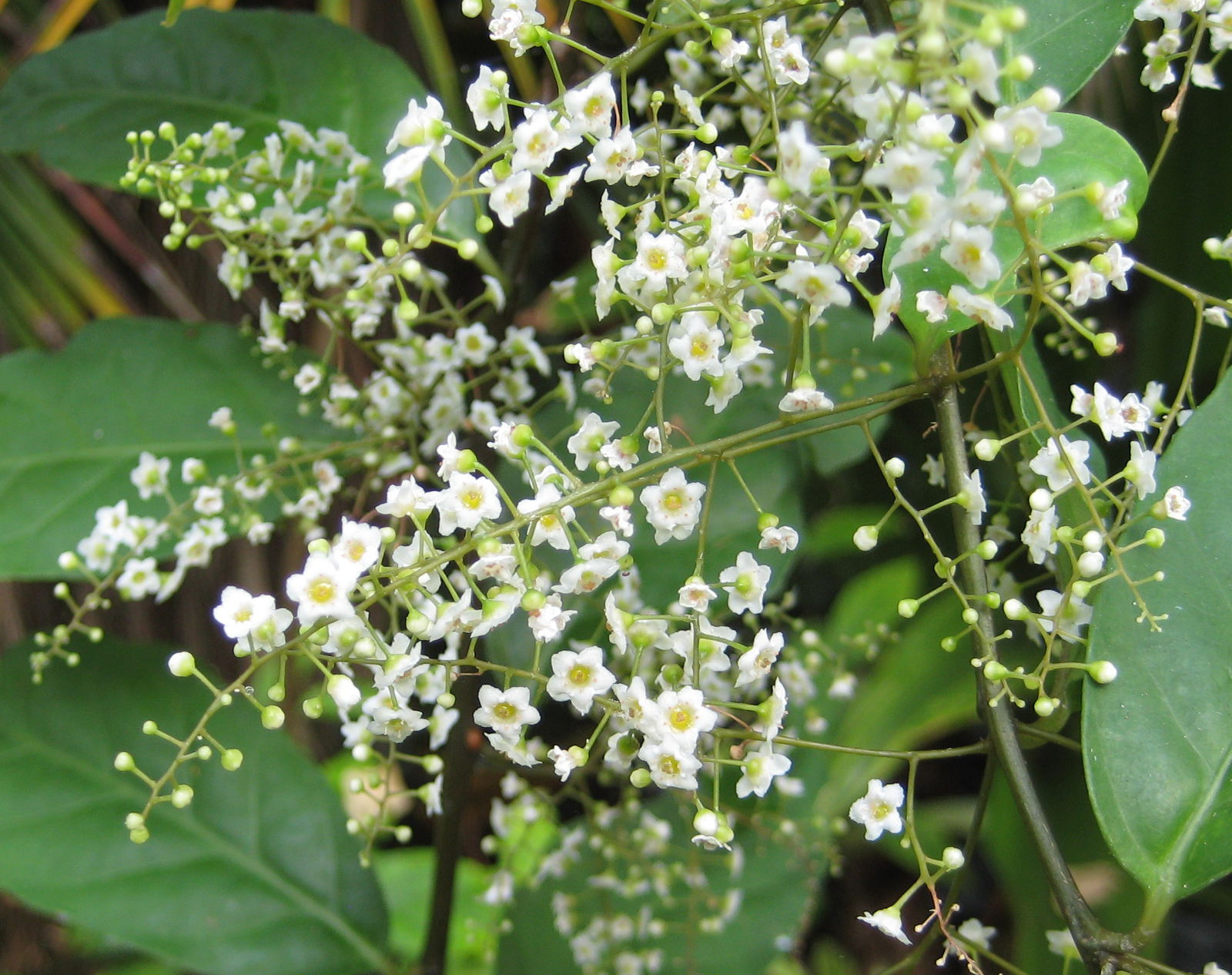
Meliosma henryi

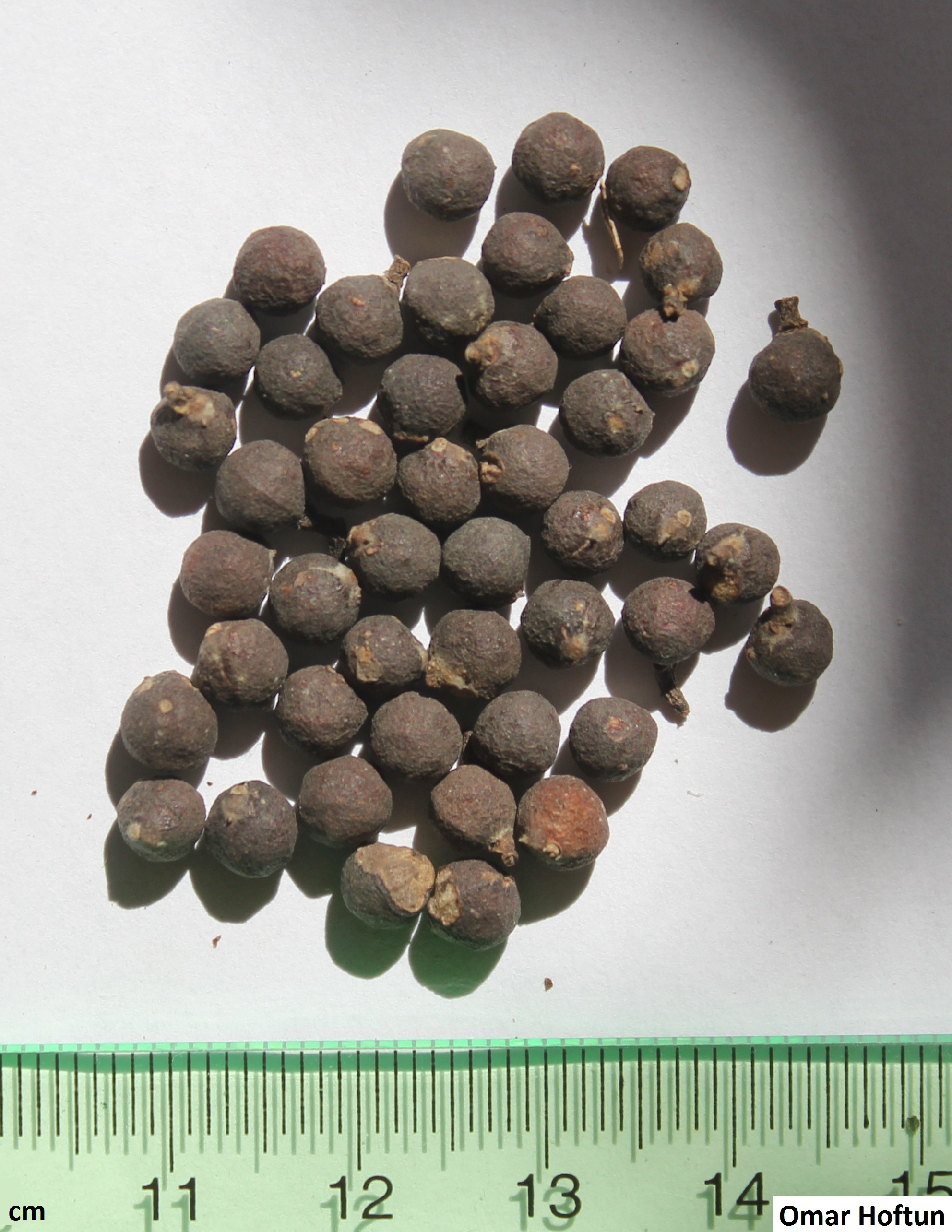
Meliosma pinnata var. oldhamii seeds

Meliosma is a genus of flowering plants in the family Sabiaceae, native to tropical to warm temperate regions of southern and eastern Asia and the Americas. It is traditionally considered to contain about 100 species; some botanists take a much more conservative view accepting only 20-25 species as distinct. They are trees or shrubs, growing to 10–45 m tall.

Fossil evidence shows the genus formerly had a much wider range in the Northern Hemisphere, including Europe and central Asia until the late Pliocene ice ages, and somewhat earlier in North America. At least 17 species of Meliosma are known from Peru.

The Indian awlking (Choaspes benjaminii) is one of the Lepidoptera whose caterpillars feed on Meliosma; they have been found on M. pungens, rhoifolia, M. rigida, and M. squamulata.

== Selected species ==
Asia

- Meliosma angustifolia
- Meliosma arnottiana (syn. Wellingtonia arnottiana)
- Meliosma beaniana
- Meliosma bifida
- Meliosma callicarpaefolia
- Meliosma cuneifolia
- Meliosma dentata
- Meliosma dilleniifolia
- Meliosma dumicola
- Meliosma flexuosa
- Meliosma fordii
- Meliosma glandulosa
- Meliosma henryi
- Meliosma kirkii
- Meliosma laui
- Meliosma longipes
- Meliosma myriantha
- Meliosma oldhamii
- Meliosma parviflora
- Meliosma paupera
- Meliosma pinnata
- Meliosma pungens
- Meliosma rhoifolia
- Meliosma rigida
- Meliosma simplicifolia
- Meliosma squamulata
- Meliosma sumatrana
- Meliosma thomsonii
- Meliosma thorelii
- Meliosma veitchiorum
- Meliosma velutina
- Meliosma yunnanensis

Americas and Caribbean

- Meliosma alba
- †Meliosma beusekomii
- Meliosma bogotana
- Meliosma brasiliensis Urb.
- Meliosma cordata
- Meliosma frondosa
- Meliosma glaziovii
- Meliosma herbertii
- Meliosma itatiaiae
- Meliosma linearifolia
- Meliosma littlei
- Meliosma meridensis
- Meliosma nesites
- Meliosma pardonii
- Meliosma sellowii
- Meliosma sinuata
- Meliosma sirensis
- Meliosma vernicosa
- Meliosma youngii

== Fossil record ==
Fossil endocarps from the early Miocene of Meliosma wetteraviensis, have been found in the Czech part of the Zittau Basin. Stratigraphical range of this taxon is from the late Oligocene to Pliocene of Western Europe and Siberia. Additional Meliosma fossils have been found in the middle Eocene Clarno Formation of Oregon, USA, and the Paleocene Fort Union Formation of Wyoming.
