= Rinorea deflexiflora =

Conservation status
- Least Concern (IUCN 3.1)

Scientific classification
- Kingdom: Plantae
- Clade: Tracheophytes
- Clade: Angiosperms
- Clade: Eudicots
- Clade: Rosids
- Order: Malpighiales
- Family: Violaceae
- Genus: Rinorea
- Species: R. deflexiflora

Binomial name
- Rinorea deflexiflora Bartlett

Species of flowering plant

Rinorea deflexiflora is a species of plant in the family Violaceae. It is native to parts of Central America. It's natural habitat is the wet tropical biome.
