= Bribria oraria =

Conservation status
- Vulnerable (IUCN 2.3)

Scientific classification
- Kingdom: Plantae
- Clade: Tracheophytes
- Clade: Angiosperms
- Clade: Eudicots
- Clade: Rosids
- Order: Malpighiales
- Family: Violaceae
- Genus: Bribria
- Species: B. oraria

Binomial name
- Bribria oraria (Steyerm. & A.Fernández) Wahlert & H.E.Ballard (2018 publ. 2017)

Synonyms
- Rinorea oraria Steyerm. & A.Fernández (1978)

Species of flowering plant

Bribria oraria is a species of flowering plant in the Violaceae family. It is a tree endemic to northern Venezuela.
