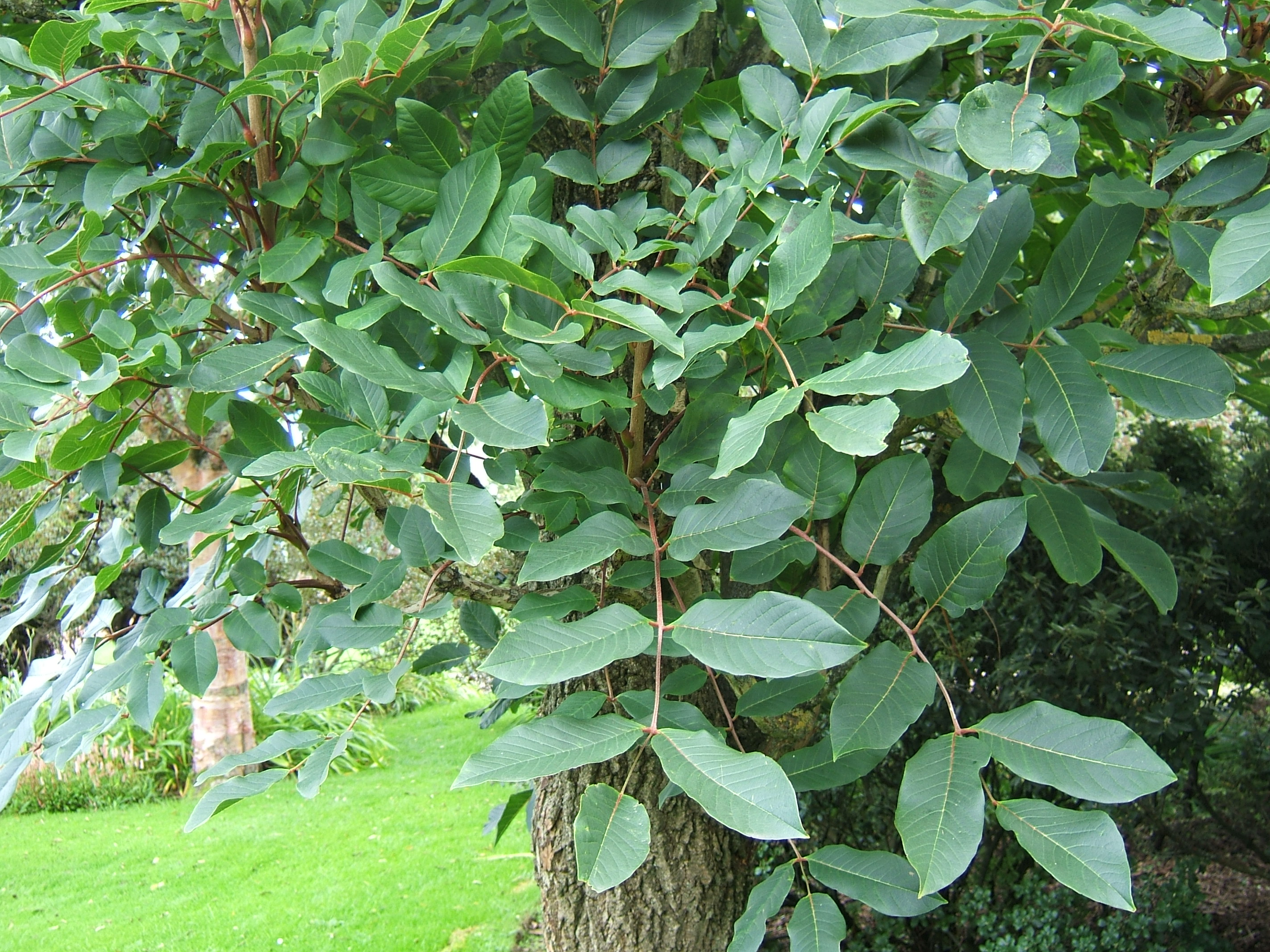
- Meliosma veitchiorum

Scientific classification
- Kingdom: Plantae
- Clade: Tracheophytes
- Clade: Angiosperms
- Clade: Eudicots
- Order: Proteales
- Family: Sabiaceae; Blume

Genera
- Meliosma Blume; Ophiocaryon R.H. Schomb. ex Endl.; Sabia Colebr.

Synonyms
- Meliosmaceae

= Sabiaceae =

Sabiaceae Temporal range: Cenomanian – recent

Family of flowering plants

Sabiaceae is a family of flowering plants that were placed in the order Proteales according to the APG IV system. It comprises three genera, Meliosma, Ophiocaryon and Sabia, with 66 known species, native to tropical to warm temperate regions of southern Asia and the Americas. The family has also been called Meliosmaceae Endl., 1841, nom. rej.

== Description ==
- Trees, climbing shrubs or woody vines, evergreen, rarely deciduous, glabrous or pubescent, rarely spiny. Indumentum of simple multicellular hairs or with bicellular capitula.
- Leaves alternate, spiral to distichous, penninerved, brochidodromous, simple or imparipinnate, herbaceous or coriaceous, sometimes very large, with simple dentate edges, sometimes heteromorphic, often the base of the stalk is woody and the base of the foliole is pulvinulate, lacking stipules, vernation conduplicate, often dotted with red glands. Stomata anomocytic or paracytic, usually hypostomatic.
- Stems with large radii, complex unilacunar nodes, without secretory cavities, perulate buds or not.
- Hermaphrodite plants, rarely polygamodioecious.
- Inflorescences in pauci- to multi-floral panicle, terminal or axillary, often reduced to solitary axillary flower, rarely on cymes or in racemes, peduncles often very short (sub-sessile flowers), bearing zero to numerous small bracts.
- Small perfect flowers, actinomorphic or obliquely zygomorphic, usually pentamerous, sepals, petals and stamens arranged in opposed whorls. Hypogynous disc present, thin, annular, nectariferous, with lobes (sometimes with hardened discoid glands) alternating with the stamens, sometimes with bifid-shaped teeth. Sepals (4-)5, in a whorl, free or basally fused, equal or with the 2 internal sepals much smaller, imbricate. Petals (4-)5, in a whorl, free, equal or the 2 internal petals often much smaller (sometimes bifid), imbricate, oppositisepalous, more or less fleshy. Androecium of (4-)5(−6) elements, 5 stamens or even 2 (opposed to the internal petals) and 3 staminodes, oppositipetalous, free from each other but fused at the base of the petals, filiform filaments, expanded below the anther or forming a collar, unilocular anthers, dithecal, introrse and bent down, enclosed in external cavities belonging to the adjacent staminode, more or less adherent between themselves, leaving a central pore through which the style passes, or even extrorse, connective strongly expanded, dehiscence through transversal slits or valves. Superior gynoecium, of 2(−3) carpels, hemicarpic with apically free styles (stylodious) or sincarpic with one short cylindrical or conic style, capitate stigmas, punctate and moist, or not papillose and dry, ovules (1-)2 per carpel, hemianatropous to campylotropous, apotropous, unitegmic and crasinucelated, horizontal or pendulous, axial placentation.
- Fruit unilocular or dilocular, asymmetric, dry or drupaceous, indehiscent, monospermatic, sometimes in schizocarp, with persistent styles, endocarp stoney or crustaceous, sculpted or foveolate.
- Seeds one, with endosperm scarce or absent, with condyle, embryo with curved, elongate hypocotyl, with 2 flat cotyledons, plicate or coiled (in Ophyocaryon paradoxum).
- Pollen tricolpate, prolate, relatively small, semitectate exine, more or less reticulate.
- Chromosomal number: 2n = 24 in Sabia japonica and = 32 in Meliosma sp.

== Ecology ==
The anthesis is extremely short. The anthers open within the bud, but enclosed in the staminodes. On maturing the bud opens explosively at the smallest touch releasing the pollen into the air.

Plants from this genus live in humid areas along rivers, in tropical forests or in warm temperatures.

== Phytochemistry ==
Cyanolipids absent. Pentacyclic triterpenoids, flavonols, proanthocyanidins and tannins present. The plants are not cyanogenetic.

== Uses ==
Some species of Meliosma have a limited use in gardening and horticulture.

== Fossils ==
The fossil genus Insitiocarpus has been found in deposits from the Cenomanian period, while the other extant genera Sabia and Meliosma have been found in European deposits from the Turonian and the Maastrichtian, respectively. The appearance of the first Sabiaceae has been dated to 122–118 million years ago.

Sabia macrofossils have been recovered from the late Zanclean stage of Pliocene sites in Pocapaglia, Italy.

== Systematic position ==
The Sabiaceae are a group of flowering plants that are included in the eudicots clade, where they form part of the basal level. In this regard they are similar to the Proteaceae, with which they share, for example, a nectariferous hypogynous disc, although they differ in the number of floral parts and the radial pentameric symmetry is completely original. Based on molecular and morphological data, the APW (Angiosperm Phylogeny Website) considers that they form part of the order Proteales, one of four families that includes the Proteaceae, the Nelumbonaceae, and the Platanaceae (cf. AP-website).

In the Cronquist system the family was placed in the order Ranunculales, but more recent classifications place it as the sole family in the order Sabiales, or (as in the APG II system and APG III system), as unplaced to order and left among the basal lineages of the eudicots. The Angiosperm Phylogeny Website, however, suggests the addition of Sabiaceae to the eudicot order Proteales would be sensible. This was done in the APG IV system.

The family consists of three genera, together about 160 species of woody plants. The genus Sabia often are lianas, while those in the genera Meliosma and Ophiocaryon are trees and shrubs; the latter two are sometimes treated in a separate family Meliosmaceae.

== Taxa included ==
The family includes three genera that can be distinguished as follows:

- Climbers or vines. 5 equal stamens. Flowers normally in axillary panicles that are pauciflorous or reduced to one flower.

Sabia Colebr., 1818. South, east and south east Asia to the Solomon Islands.

- Trees. 2 stamens, opposed to internal petals, the other 3 reduced to squamiform staminodes. Flowers normally in terminal or axillary panicles, multifloral.

- Subequal petals. Staminodes without lateral cavities. Carpels with free styles.

Ophiocaryon R.H. Schomb. ex Endl., 1841. Tropical South America.

- Very uneven petals, the 2 internal ones very reduced. Staminodes with lateral cavities to receive the anthers. Carpels normally with one common style.

Meliosma Blume, 1823. South east Asia, Mexico, Central America, Antilles and South America.

== See also ==
- Sabia swinhoei
