= Jackass Flat Nature Conservation Reserve =

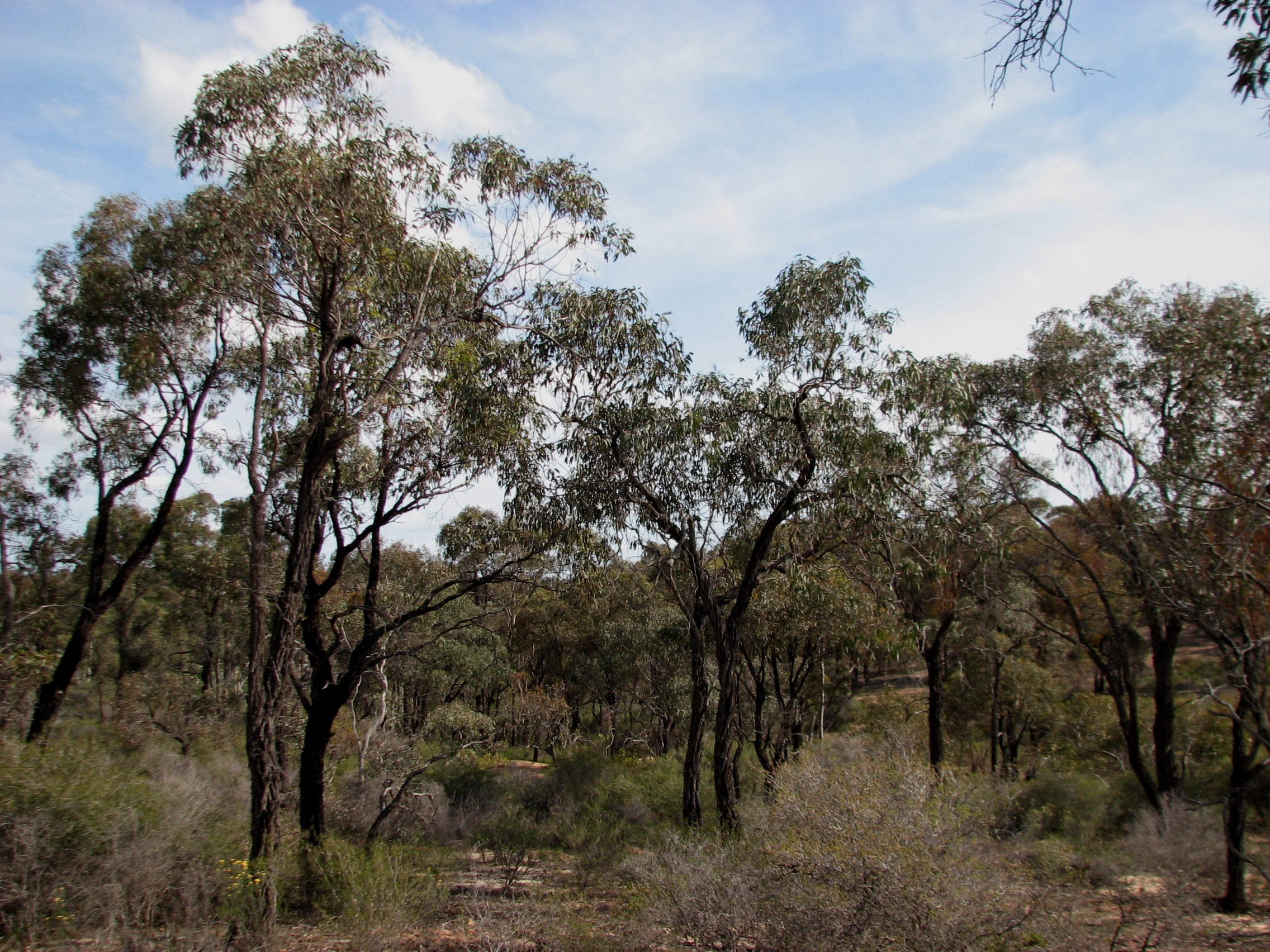
- Eucalyptus tricarpa in Jackass Flat Nature Conservation Reserve

- Location within Victoria
- Location: Victoria
- Nearest city: Jackass Flat
- Coordinates: 36°43′39″S 144°17′06″E
- Area: 73.4 ha (181 acres)
- Established: 1980
- Governing body: Parks Victoria
- Website: Official website

Jackass Flat Nature Conservation Reserve is a 73.4 hectares (181 acres) reserve, located in Jackass Flat, a northern suburb of Bendigo in Victoria, Australia. The reserve was established in 1980 and is managed by Parks Victoria.

The dominant tree species within the reserve are ironbark (Eucalyptus tricarpa), red box (Eucalyptus polyanthemos) and grey box (Eucalyptus microcarpa). Flowering shrub species include totem poles (Melaleuca decussata), violet honey-myrtle (Melaleuca wilsonii), common fringe-myrtle (Calytrix tetragona), sticky boronia, (Boronia anemonifolia), fairy wax-flower (Philotheca verrucosa), goldfields grevillea (Grevillea dryophylla), shrub violet (Hybanthus floribundus) and the rare star hair (Astrotricha linearis). Other plant species include golden pennants (Glischrocaryon behrii) as well as numerous orchids.
