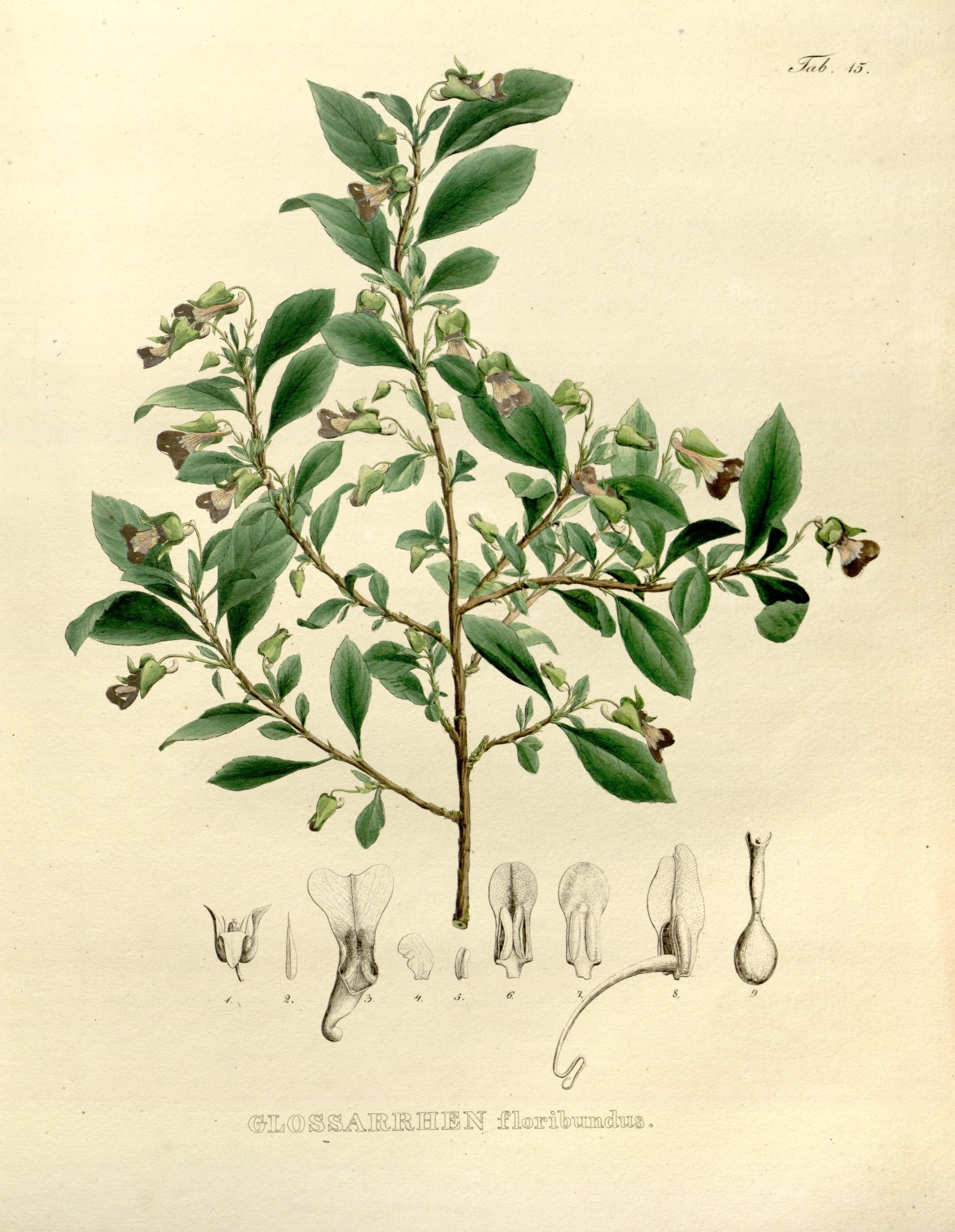
- Schweiggeria fruticosa

Scientific classification
- Kingdom: Plantae
- Clade: Tracheophytes
- Clade: Angiosperms
- Clade: Eudicots
- Clade: Rosids
- Order: Malpighiales
- Family: Violaceae
- Subfamily: Violoideae
- Tribe: Violeae
- Genus: Schweiggeria; Spreng.

Type species
- Schweiggeria fruticosa Spreng.

Synonyms
- Glossarrhen Mart.

= Schweiggeria =

Genus of flowering plants

Schweiggeria is a genus of flowering plants in the violet family Violaceae, with one or two species, found in eastern Brazil.

== Description ==
Shrubs, with oblanceolate (wider near tip) leaves. White flowers are strongly zygomorphic (bilaterally symmetrical), rarely solitary, in axillary fascicles, with caducous corolla with the bottom petal longer than the others and clawed with a well exserted spur. The stamens have free filaments, with the two lowest being calcarate (spurred).They also possess a large dorsal connective appendage that is entire and oblong-ovate. In the gynoecium, the style is rostellate (beaked) or lobed. The fruit is a thick-walled capsule with three obovoid seeds per carpel.

== Taxonomy ==
The genus Schweiggeria was first described by Sprengel, with the single species Schweiggeria fruticosa, placing it in the family Ionidia, named for the genus Ionidium in 1821. In 1846, Lindley classified both Schweiggeria and Ionidium in Violaceae, within the Violales, although Bentham and Hooker (1862) called the family Violarieae.

Historically Schweiggeria was placed within Violaceae in the subfamily Violoideae, tribe Violeae, subtribe Violinae, together with Anchietea, Calyptrion, Noisettia and Viola. Still these divisions are artificial and not monophyletic. Molecular phylogenetic studies show that Violaceae is best considered as four clades rather than taxonomic ranks. Schweiggeria occurs in Clade I of the family, consisting of Viola, Schweiggeria, Noisettia, and Allexis, in which Schweiggeria and Noisettia are monotypic and form a sister group to Viola.

=== Etymology ===
Sprengel named the genus in honour of his colleague August Friedrich Schweigger (1783–1821).

=== Subdivision ===
Four species have been described;

- Schweiggeria floribunda A.St.-Hil.
- Schweiggeria fruticosa Spreng.
- Schweiggeria mexicana Schltdl.
- Schweiggeria pauciflora (Mart.) Lindl.

of which two, S. fruticosa and S. mexicana are accepted by Plants of the World Online, considering S. floribunda and S. pauciflora as synonyms of S. fruticosa. Other authors consider Schweiggeria to be monotypic for S. fruticosa.

== Distribution and habitat ==
Eastern Brazil.

== Bibliography ==
- Ballard, Harvey E; Paula-Souza, Juliana de; Wahlert, Gregory A (2013). "Violaceae". In Kubitzki, Klaus (ed.). Flowering Plants. 11 Eudicots: Malpighiales. Springer Science & Business Media. pp. 303–322. ISBN 978-3-642-39417-1.(Also preview at Springer)
- Bentham, G.; Hooker, J.D. (1862). "Violarieae". Genera plantarum ad exemplaria imprimis in herbariis kewensibus servata definita (3 vols.). Vol. 1. London: L Reeve & Co. pp. 114–121.
- Byng, James W. (2014). "Violaceae". The Flowering Plants Handbook: A practical guide to families and genera of the world. Plant Gateway Ltd. pp. 238–239. ISBN 978-0-9929993-1-5.
- Christenhusz, Maarten J. M.; Fay, Michael F.; Chase, Mark W. (2017). "Violaceae". Plants of the World: An Illustrated Encyclopedia of Vascular Plants. University of Chicago Press. pp. 324–325. ISBN 978-0-226-52292-0.
- Lindley, John (1846). "Violaceae". The Vegetable Kingdom: or, The structure, classification, and uses of plants, illustrated upon the natural system (1st ed.). London: Bradbury. pp. 338–339.
- Sprengel, Kurt Polycarp Joachim (1820–1823). "Ionidia: Schweiggeria fruticosa". Neue Entdeckungen im ganzen Umfang der Pflanzenkunde 3 vols. Leipzig: F. Fleischer. pp. I: 167–168.
- Ballard, Harvey E.; Sytsma, Kenneth J.; Kowal, Robert R. (October 1998). "Shrinking the Violets: Phylogenetic Relationships of Infrageneric Groups in Viola (Violaceae) Based on Internal Transcribed Spacer DNA Sequences" (PDF). Systematic Botany. 23 (4): 439. doi:10.2307/2419376. JSTOR 2419376.
- Wahlert, Gregory A.; Marcussen, Thomas; de Paula-Souza, Juliana; Feng, Min; Ballard, Harvey E. (1 March 2014). "A Phylogeny of the Violaceae (Malpighiales) Inferred from Plastid DNA Sequences: Implications for Generic Diversity and Intrafamilial Classification". Systematic Botany. 39 (1): 239–252. doi:10.1600/036364414X678008. S2CID 86452033.
- Yockteng, R.; Jr Ballard, H. E.; Mansion, G.; Dajoz, I.; Nadot, S. (1 November 2003). "Relationships among pansies ( Viola section Melanium ) investigated using ITS and ISSR markers". Plant Systematics and Evolution. 241 (3–4): 153–170. Bibcode:2003PSyEv.241..153Y. doi:10.1007/s00606-003-0045-7. JSTOR 23645153. S2CID 25104565.
- WFO (2019). "Schweiggeria Spreng". World Flora Online.
- POTWO. "Schweiggeria Spreng". Plants of the World Online. Royal Botanic Gardens, Kew.
- IPNI. "Schweiggeria Spreng., Neue Entdeck. Pflanzenk. 2: 167 (1821)". Royal Botanic Gardens, Kew.
