= Imbophorus aptalis =

Scientific classification
- Kingdom: Animalia
- Phylum: Arthropoda
- Class: Insecta
- Order: Lepidoptera
- Family: Pterophoridae
- Genus: Imbophorus
- Species: I. aptalis

Binomial name
- Imbophorus aptalis (Walker, 1864)

Synonyms
- Aciptilus aptalis Walker, 1864; Pterophorus aptalis (Walker, 1864); Aciptilia aptalis

Species of plume moth

Imbophorus aptalis is a species of moth of the family Pterophoridae. It is found in Australia (from northern Queensland to southern New South Wales and south-western Australia), as well as the New Hebrides, Fiji and Tonga.

The wingspan is about 17–25 mm.

The larvae feed on Astrotricha latifolia and Astrotricha floccosa.
