= Jackass Flat =

- Suburb
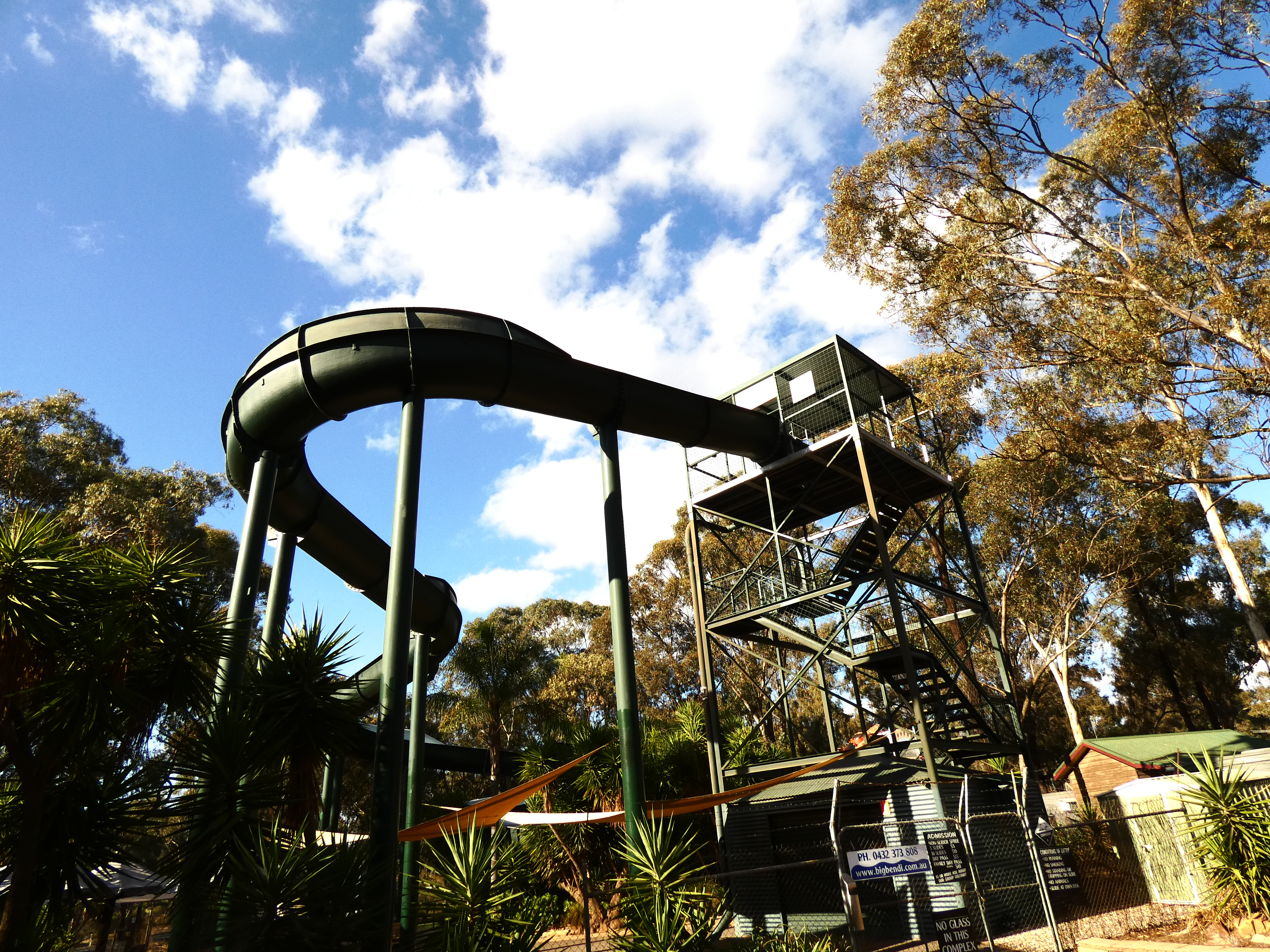
- Water slide at Jackass Flat, May 2026

- Interactive map of Jackass Flat
- Coordinates: 36°43′0″S 144°17′0″E
- Country: Australia
- State: Victoria
- City: Bendigo
- LGA: City of Greater Bendigo
- Location: 6.5 km (4.0 mi) N of Bendigo

Government
  - State electorate: Bendigo East
  - Federal division: Bendigo

Population
  - Total: 1,907 (SAL 2021)
- Postcode: 3556

Jackass Flat is a suburb of the city of Bendigo in central Victoria, Australia. Jackass Flat is in the City of Greater Bendigo, 6.5 kilometres (4.0 mi) north of the Bendigo central business district.

== History ==
At the 2006 census, Jackass Flat had a population of 224. At the 2016 census, Jackass Flat had a population of 1,141. Jackass Flat has continued to show signs of development with the 2021 census showing that the population had expanded to 1,907.

== Ecology ==
Jackass Flat Nature Conservation Reserve, a 73.4 hectares (181 acres) reserve was established in 1980. It contains the rare Star-hair (Astrotricha linearis) and Shrub Violet (Hybanthus floribundus).
