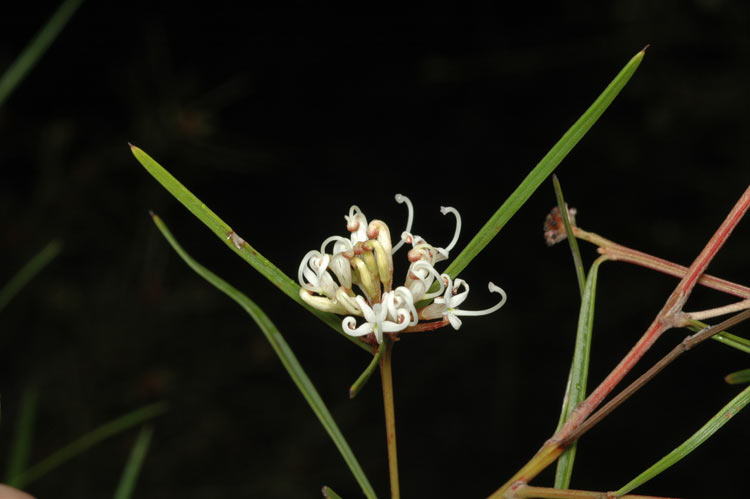
- In the Australian National Botanic Gardens

Scientific classification
- Kingdom: Plantae
- Clade: Tracheophytes
- Clade: Angiosperms
- Clade: Eudicots
- Order: Proteales
- Family: Proteaceae
- Genus: Grevillea
- Species: G. wiradjuri

Binomial name
- Grevillea wiradjuri Makinson

Synonyms
- Grevillea linearifolia f. 'k' (Western slopes form); Grevillea linearifolia f. Western Slopes form; Grevillea sp. aff. neurophylla

= Grevillea wiradjuri =

Species of shrub endemic to Australia

Grevillea wiradjuri is species of flowering plant in the family Proteaceae and is endemic to inland New South Wales. It is an open, erect or dwarf shrub with linear leaves, and clusters of 8 to 20 white flowers.

== Description ==
Grevillea wiradjuri is an open, erect or dwarf shrub that typically grows to a height of 0.2–1.8 m (7.9 in – 5 ft 10.9 in), and sometimes forms a rhizome. Its leaves are linear, 30–75 mm (1.2–3.0 in) long and 0.7–1.3 mm (0.028–0.051 in) wide. The edges of the leaves are rolled under enclosing the lower surface apart from the mid-vein. The flowers are arranged in sessile clusters of 8 to 20 on the ends of branches and surrounded by the foliage, the pistil 7–9 mm (0.28–0.35 in) long. The flowers are white, sometimes becoming slightly pink or red as they age, and the style is strongly curved near its tip. Flowering occurs from August to December and the fruit is a glabrous, oval follicle 9–10 mm (0.35–0.39 in) long.

== Taxonomy ==
Grevillea wiradjuri was first formally described in 2000 by Robert Makinson in the Flora of Australia from specimens collected by Michael Crisp near Temora in 1988. The specific epithet (wiradjuri) refers to the Wiradjuri people, who occupied country where this species is found.

== Distribution and habitat ==
This grevillea grows in forest or woodland, usually in stony places on low ridges between Temora, Barmedman and Ariah Park with disjunct populations near Parkes and in Goobang National Park, in inland New South Wales.
