= Goobang National Park =

National park in New South Wales, Australia

- IUCN category II (national park)
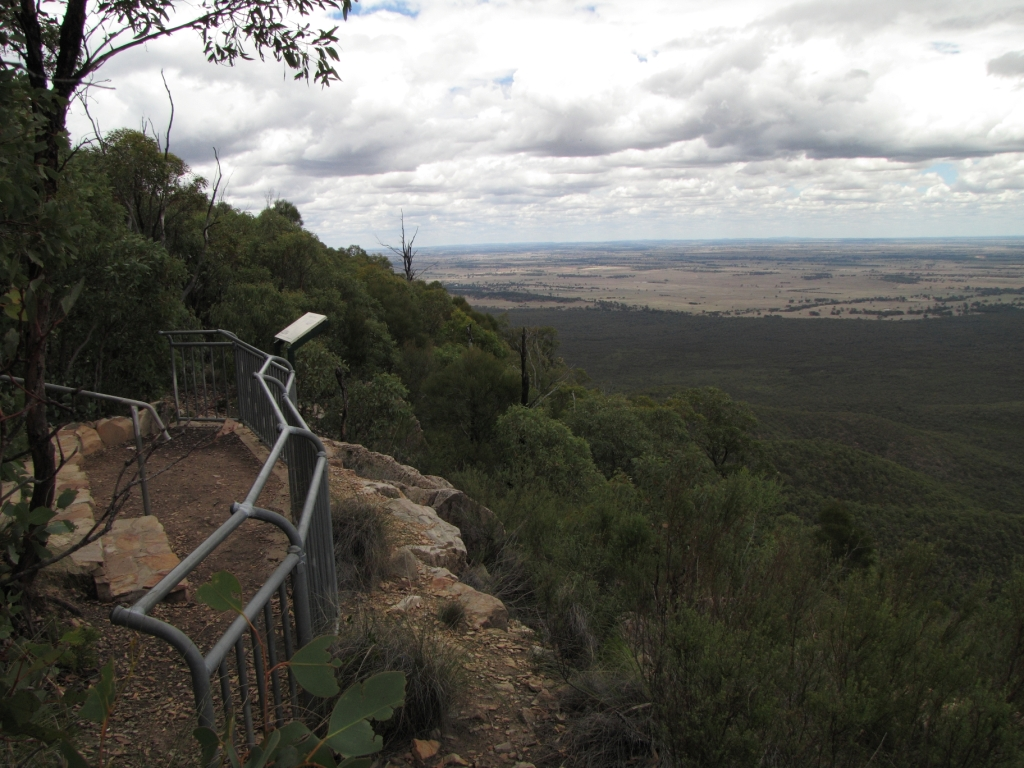
- The view south-west from Caloma lookout

- Location within New South Wales
- Location: New South Wales
- Nearest city: Parkes
- Coordinates: 32°41′08″S 148°20′10″E
- Area: 421 km^{2} (163 sq mi)
- Established: 22 December 1995
- Governing body: New South Wales National Parks and Wildlife Service
- Website: Official website

Goobang is a national park located in New South Wales, Australia, 296 kilometres (184 mi) northwest of Sydney. It protects the largest remnant forest and woodland in the central west region of the state, where interior and coastal New South Wales flora and fauna species overlap. Originally named Herveys Range by John Oxley in 1817, the area was reserved in 1897 as state forest because of its importance as a timber resource, and was designated a national park in 1995.

The park contains a camping ground and a hiking trail, Burrabadine Peak Walking Track, a 3.6 km round trip moderate hike.

== Climate ==
Goobang National Park is in a temperate to semi-arid zone experiencing hot summers and cool winters with temperatures ranging from 4 to 15 °C (39 to 59 °F) in winter and 17 to 32 °C (63 to 90 °F) in summer. The heaviest rain fall is in the summer and can range from 645 millimetres (25.4 in) on the east side of the ranges to 564 millimetres (22.2 in) west of the ranges.

== Flora ==
There are 459 species recorded in the park, several that are threatened. Tylophora linearis is listed as vulnerable according to the TCS ACT 1995 and endangered according to the EPBC ACT 1999. Eriostemon ericifolius is vulnerable based on TCS ACT 1995 and Astrotricha linearis only known record west of the Great Dividing Range. Pomaderris queenslandica endangered TSC ACT 1995 and Philotheca ericifolia vulnerable EPBC ACT 1999.

There are 135 ecological communities in the South West Slope bioregion, most are considered poorly protected.(4) There are 11 ecological communities in the park, five of which are only protected at Goobang. These include red stringybark (Eucalyptus macrorhyncha) woodland found on siliceous hillslopes of the Hervey Range. Red stringybark (Eucalyptus macrorhyncha), long leaved box (Eucalyptus goniocalyx) black cypress pine (Callitris endlicheri), hummock grass (Triodia scariosa), shrubby low woodland found on siliceous volcanic and sedimentary ranges. Red ironbark (Eucalyptus fibrosa) in association with black cypress (Callitris endlicheri) shrubby woodland found on shallow sandy soils derived from sandstone. Red ironbark (Eucalyptus fibrosa), red stringybark (Eucalyptus macrorhyncha) tumbledown gum (Eucalyptus dealbata) heathland found on siliceous ridges and scribbly gum (Eucalyptus rossii) dominated open forest in association with black cypress pine and red ironbark.

A further four communities that are protected in Goobang are considered to be of significance. Mugga ironbark (Eucalyptus sideroxylon), black cypress, red stringybark, Blakely's red gum (Eucalyptus blakelyi) and red ironbark woodland which are found on hillslopes and in valleys on the ranges. Buloke (Allocasuarina leuhmannii) and white cypress pine (Callitris glaucophylla) woodland is found on alkaline soils. Riparian Blakely's red gum, apple box (Eucalyptus bridgesiana), yellow box (Eucalyptus melliodora) and occasionally inland grey box (Eucalyptus macrocarpa), with shrub, sedge and grass tall open forest in valleys. White box (Eucalyptus albens), with black cypress and red gum (Eucalyptus polyanthemos) shrubby woodlands in the hills.

== Fire ==
Fires are an intrinsic feature of the Australian bush, to ensure continual biodiversity prescribed burns are carried out at the appropriate times within the park. Wildfires at Goobang have occurred due to dry lightning strikes in the hot summer months. There have been 52 wildfires recorded since 1942.

== Fauna ==
There are 31 species of reptiles, 14 species of frogs and 31 species of mammals recorded in the park including echidnas, wallaby, kangaroos, possums and bats as well as exotics such as rabbits, cats, foxes, goats, sheep and dogs. Threatened species include carpet python (Morelia spilotes), Sloane's froglet (Crinia sloanei), koala (Phascolarctos cinereus), brush tailed rock wallaby (Petrogale pencicllata), grey-headed flying-fox (Pteropus poliocephalus), yellow-bellied sheathtail bat (Saccolaimus flaviventris), Corben's long eared bat (Nyetophilus corbeni) and New Holland mouse (Pseudomys novaehollandiae).

== Avifauna ==
It is becoming evident that due to clearing of eucalyptus forests that woodland birds are on the decline. Birds of significance that have been sighted at Goobang are varied sittella (Daphoenositta chrysoptera) painted honeyeater (Grantiella picta), black-chinned honeyeater (Melithreptus gularis), regent honeyeater (Anthochaera phrygia), scarlet robin (Petroica boodang), flame robin (Petrocia phoenice), hooded robin (Melanodryas cucullata), Gilbert's whistler (Pachycephala inornata), diamond firetail (Emblema guttata) grey-crowned babbler (Pomatostomus temporalis), speckled warbler (Chthonicola saggitatus), brown treecreeper (Climacteris picumnus), glossy black cockatoo (Calyptorhynchus lathami), superb parrot (Polytellis swainsonii), little lorikeet (Glossopsitta pusilla), turquoise parrot (Neophema pulchella), spotted harrier (Circus assimilis), barking owl (Ninox connivens), black falcon (Falco subniger), and little eagle (Heiraaetus morphnoides).

== Environmental threats ==
=== Feral animals ===
Feral animals pose a huge threat to native species due to predation, disease and competition. Feral cats for example have been responsible for reduced numbers and extinction of small mammals and birds.) Rabbits pose a threat to the survival of tree seedlings competition with native herbivores.

=== Environmental weeds ===
Weeds such as blackberry are significant as far as causing havoc within the natural environment forming large thickets blocking creeks suppressing native ground covers and providing a hiding spot for feral animals such as rabbits. Exotic grasses, pastures and weeds have replaced native undergrowth in most of the scattered white box communities.

=== Agriculture practices ===
Grazing in and around remnant vegetation is a general threat to Australia's woodlands, suppressing natural regeneration Clearing of native vegetation that might act as connective corridors between the park and nearby woodland fragments is a threat to Goobang identified in the NP Plan of Management.

=== Human – induced climate change ===
Species that require specialized niches and or cannot disperse and effectively colonize suitable habitat will be affected if this current trend of human induced climate change continues. It is estimated that 52% of the already declining population of frogs and 35% of birds will be affected. Koalas are listed by the IUCN as one of the top 10 species to become extinct. Koala populations are already at risk because of habitat modification and chlamydia. Increasing CO_{2} levels will affect the nutrient availability of eucalyptus leaves further weakening koala populations, increased frequency of droughts and bushfire will force koalas to seek new habitats, exposing them to the dangers of predation and injury from traffic.

== See also ==
- Protected areas of New South Wales
