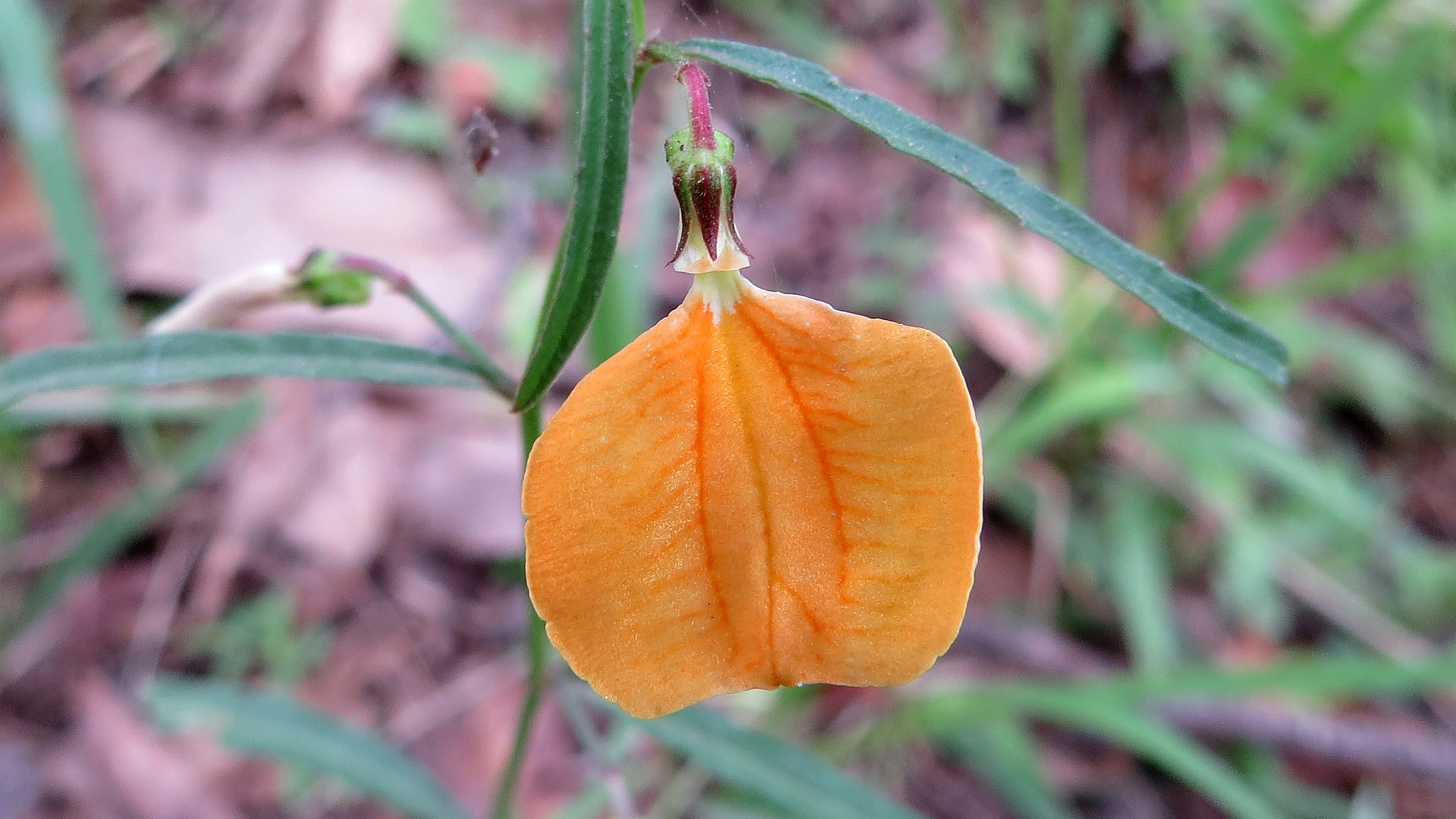
- Flower and leaf of Hybanthus stellarioides

Scientific classification
- Kingdom: Plantae
- Clade: Tracheophytes
- Clade: Angiosperms
- Clade: Eudicots
- Clade: Rosids
- Order: Malpighiales
- Family: Violaceae
- Genus: Hybanthus
- Species: H. stellarioides

Binomial name
- Hybanthus stellarioides (Domin) P.I.Forst.

Synonyms
- Hybanthus enneaspermus var. stellarioides Domin; Afrohybanthus stellarioides (Domin) Flicker

= Hybanthus stellarioides =

Species of flowering plant

Hybanthus stellarioides, commonly known as spade flower is an annual herb of the genus Hybanthus, native to Australia.

== Description ==
Hybanthus stellarioides is an annual herb to 30 cm (12 in) high, with scattered, sparse hairs on the stem. The leaves are discolorous, recurved and can be entire or toothed. The leaves are 1–8 cm (0.39–3.15 in) long and 2–8 mm (0.079–0.315 in) wide.

Flowers are solitary with petals orange or yellow in colour. The prominent lower petal is spathulate. The upper and lateral petals are linear-oblong 3–5 mm (0.12–0.20 in) long. The capsule is 5.5–7.5 mm (0.22–0.30 in) long, enclosing 5-10 seeds. Flowering period is summer.

== Taxonomy ==
Hybanthus stellarioides was described by K. Domin in 1928 as Hybanthus enneaspermus var. stellarioides, but in 1993 was named Hybanthus stellarioides by P.I. Forster.

== Habitat and ecology ==
Hybanthus stellarioides is found in sandy areas in eucalypt dominated communities. It is widespread in New South Wales along the North coast and Central Coast. It is also found along the Queensland east coast.

== See also ==
- Hybanthus genus
