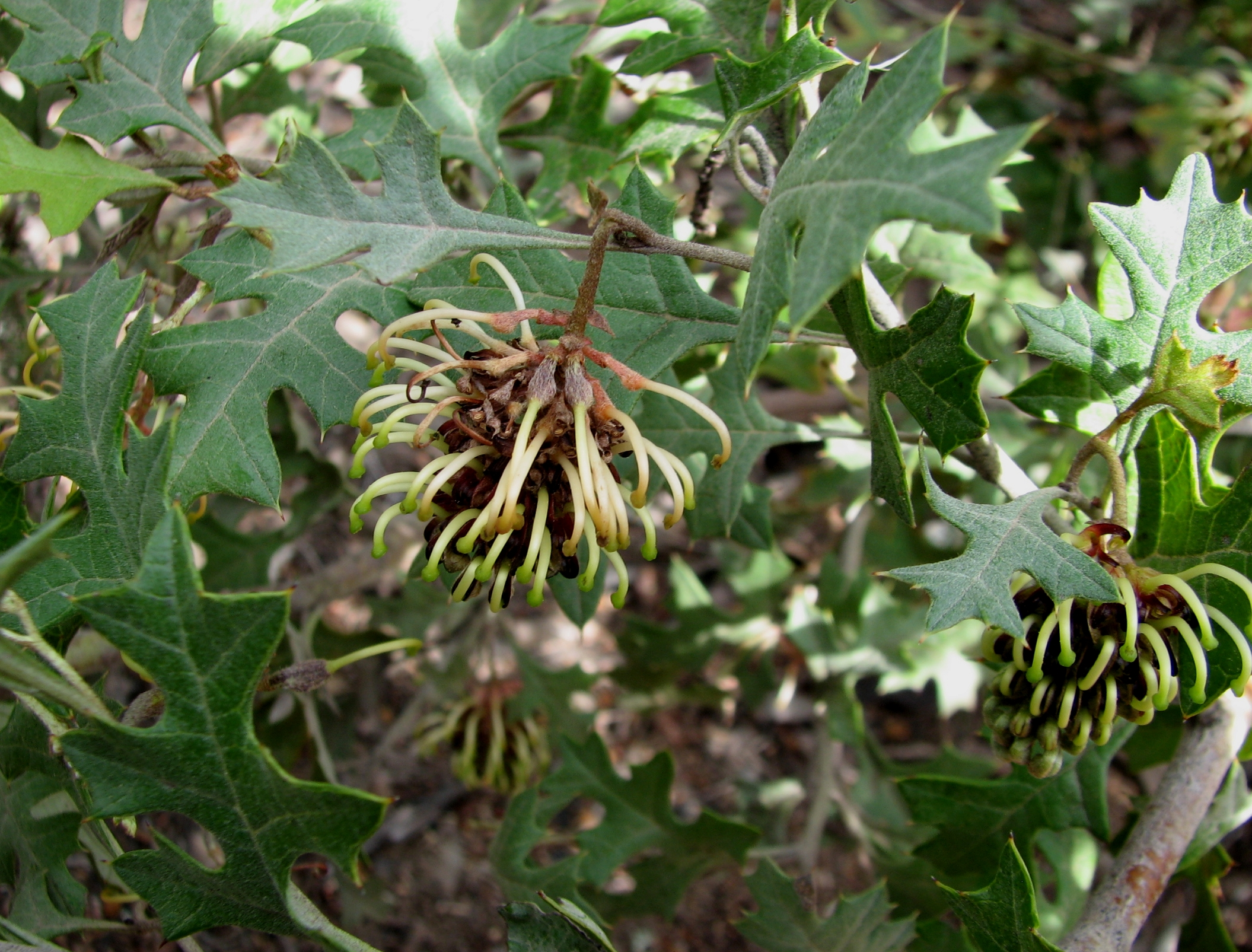
- In the Jackass Flat Nature Conservation Reserve

Scientific classification
- Kingdom: Plantae
- Clade: Embryophytes
- Clade: Tracheophytes
- Clade: Spermatophytes
- Clade: Angiosperms
- Clade: Eudicots
- Order: Proteales
- Family: Proteaceae
- Genus: Grevillea
- Species: G. dryophylla

Binomial name
- Grevillea dryophylla N.A.Wakef.

= Grevillea dryophylla =

Species of flowering plant

Grevillea dryophylla, also known as Goldfields grevillea, is a species of flowering plant in the family Proteaceae and is endemic to Victoria, Australia. It is a spreading to erect shrub with hairy branchlets, lobed leaves, and green to brown or yellow flowers.

== Description ==
Grevillea dryophylla is a spreading to erect shrub that typically grows to a height of 0.3–1.5 m (1 ft 0 in – 4 ft 11 in) and has hairy branchlets. Its leaves are 20–85 mm (0.79–3.35 in) long and 20–70 mm (0.79–2.76 in) wide in outline, and usually have three to seven lobes 6–30 mm (0.24–1.18 in) long and 5–20 mm (0.20–0.79 in) wide, occasionally simple or with two to five teeth. The tips of the teeth or lobes are usually sharply pointed, the edges are turned down and the lower surface in covered with wavy to curly hairs. The flowers are arranged in groups on a rachis 10–40 mm (0.39–1.57 in) long and are green to light brown or dull yellow, the pistil 13.5–15.5 mm (0.53–0.61 in) long with a glabrous red to pink or dull yellow style. Flowering occurs from August to November and the fruit is a glabrous, silky-hairy follicle 9–12.5 mm (0.35–0.49 in) long.

== Taxonomy ==
Grevillea dryophylla was first formally described in 1957 by Norman Wakefield in The Victorian Naturalist from specimens collected near Bendigo in 1934 by Alfred James Tadgell.

== Distribution and habitat ==
Goldfields grevillea occurs in dry sclerophyll forest in an area bounded by St Arnaud, Bendigo, Castlemaine and Maryborough.

== Conservation status ==
The species is listed as endangered under the Flora and Fauna Guarantee Act 1998. It is also listed as rare in Victoria on the Department of Environment and Primary Industries Advisory List of Rare or Threatened Plants in Victoria.
