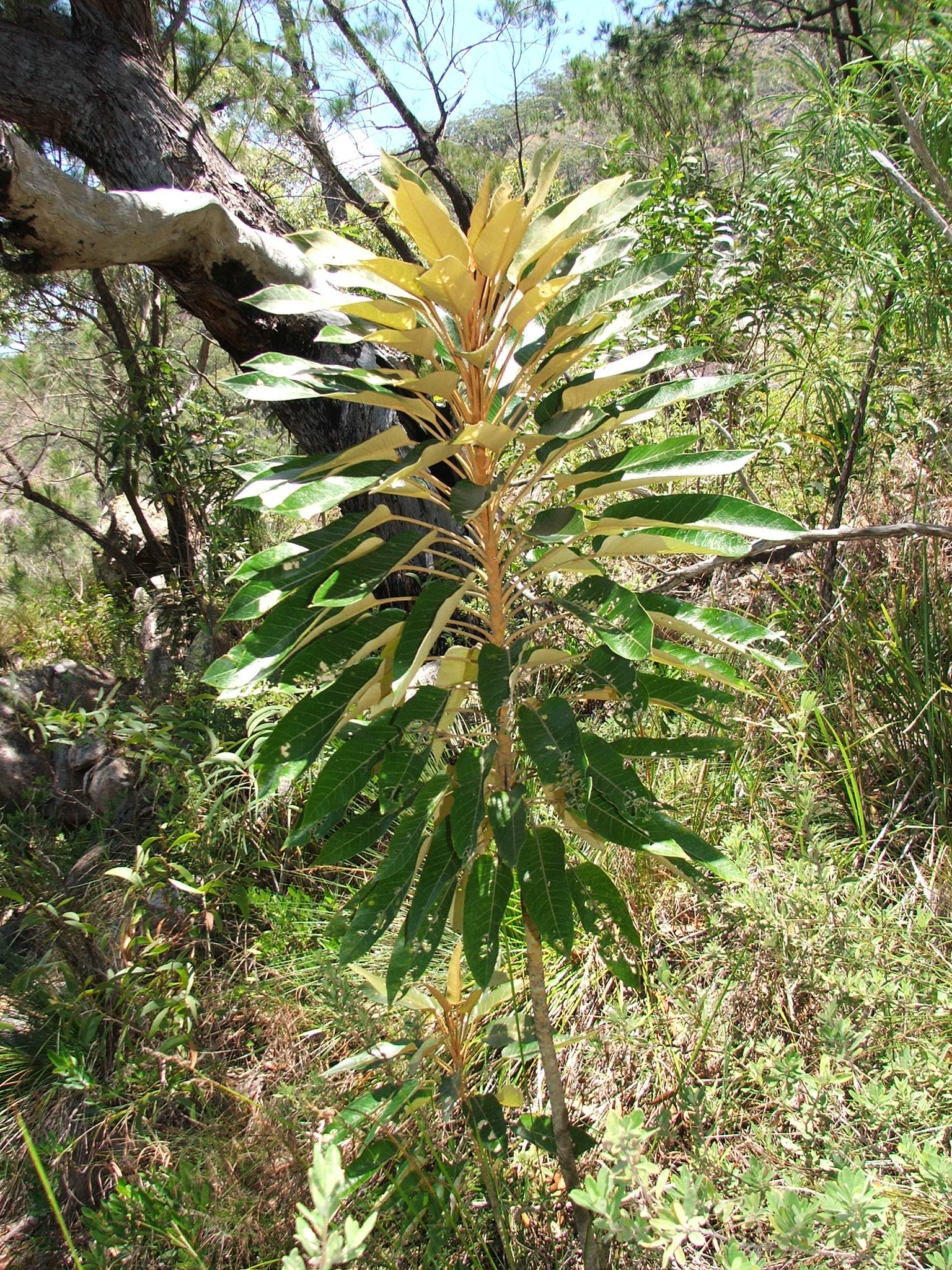
- On Walsh's Pyramid near Cairns, Queensland

Conservation status
- Least Concern (NCA)

Scientific classification
- Kingdom: Plantae
- Clade: Tracheophytes
- Clade: Angiosperms
- Clade: Eudicots
- Clade: Asterids
- Order: Apiales
- Family: Araliaceae
- Genus: Astrotricha
- Species: A. pterocarpa

Binomial name
- Astrotricha pterocarpa Benth.

= Astrotricha pterocarpa =

Species of flowering plant

Astrotricha pterocarpa is a plant in the ivy family Araliaceae found only in tropical Queensland, Australia.

== Description ==
Astrotricha pterocarpa is a single-stemmed shrub growing up to 7 m tall, with large spirally arranged leaves on the upper stem. The lower parts of the stem are glabrous (hairless) and marked by conspicuous leaf scars—the upper parts are clothed in a brown indumentum.

The leaves are simple and without stipules. They have a blunt obtuse base and a pointed tip, and are held on petioles that are between 5.5 and 12.5 cm long. They measure up to 27 cm long by 4 cm wide, are dark green above but covered in a dense brown indumentum on the underside.

The inflorescence is a terminal panicle composed of umbels – overall it may measure up to 100 cm long by 50 cm wide. The umbels each have between 10 and 15 cream or pale green bisexual flowers. There are five lobes on the calyx, five petals and five stamens. The ovary is inferior and there are two recurved styles. The fruit is a schizocarp about 12 mm long and 7 mm wide.

== Taxonomy ==
This was first described by the British botanist George Bentham, and published in volume 3 of his book Flora Australiensis in 1867. The description was based on material collected from Fitzroy Island.

=== Etymology ===
The species epithet pterocarpa means "winged fruit", a reference to the papery wing that develop on the seeds.

== Distribution and habitat ==
This species grows in open forest from north of Cooktown southwards to Pentland (about 348 km west of Airlie Beach). It grows on shallow sandy soils.

== Conservation ==
This species is listed as least concern under the Queensland Government's Nature Conservation Act. As of 4 June 2024, it has not been assessed by the International Union for Conservation of Nature (IUCN).

== Gallery ==
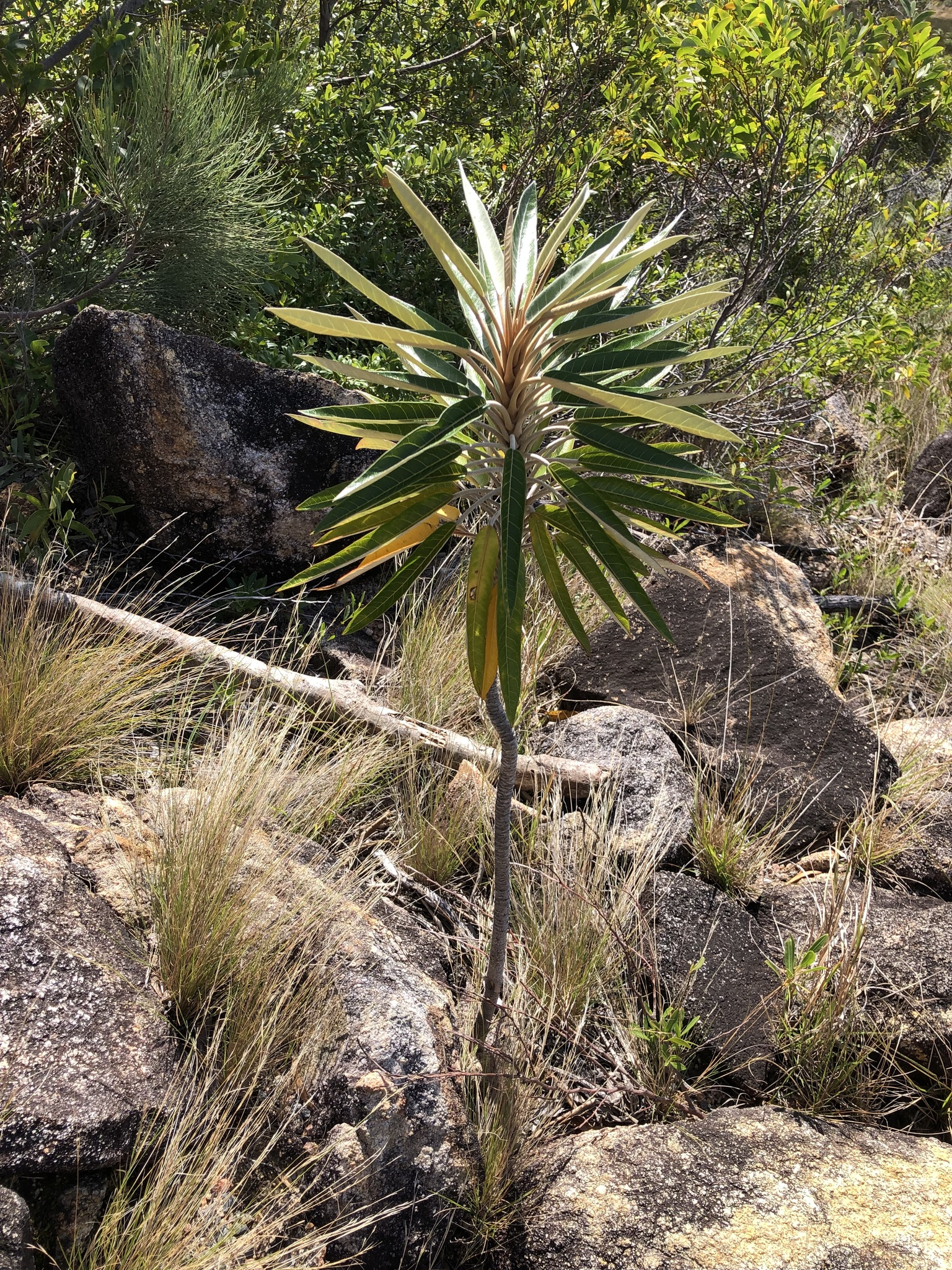
With a single stem

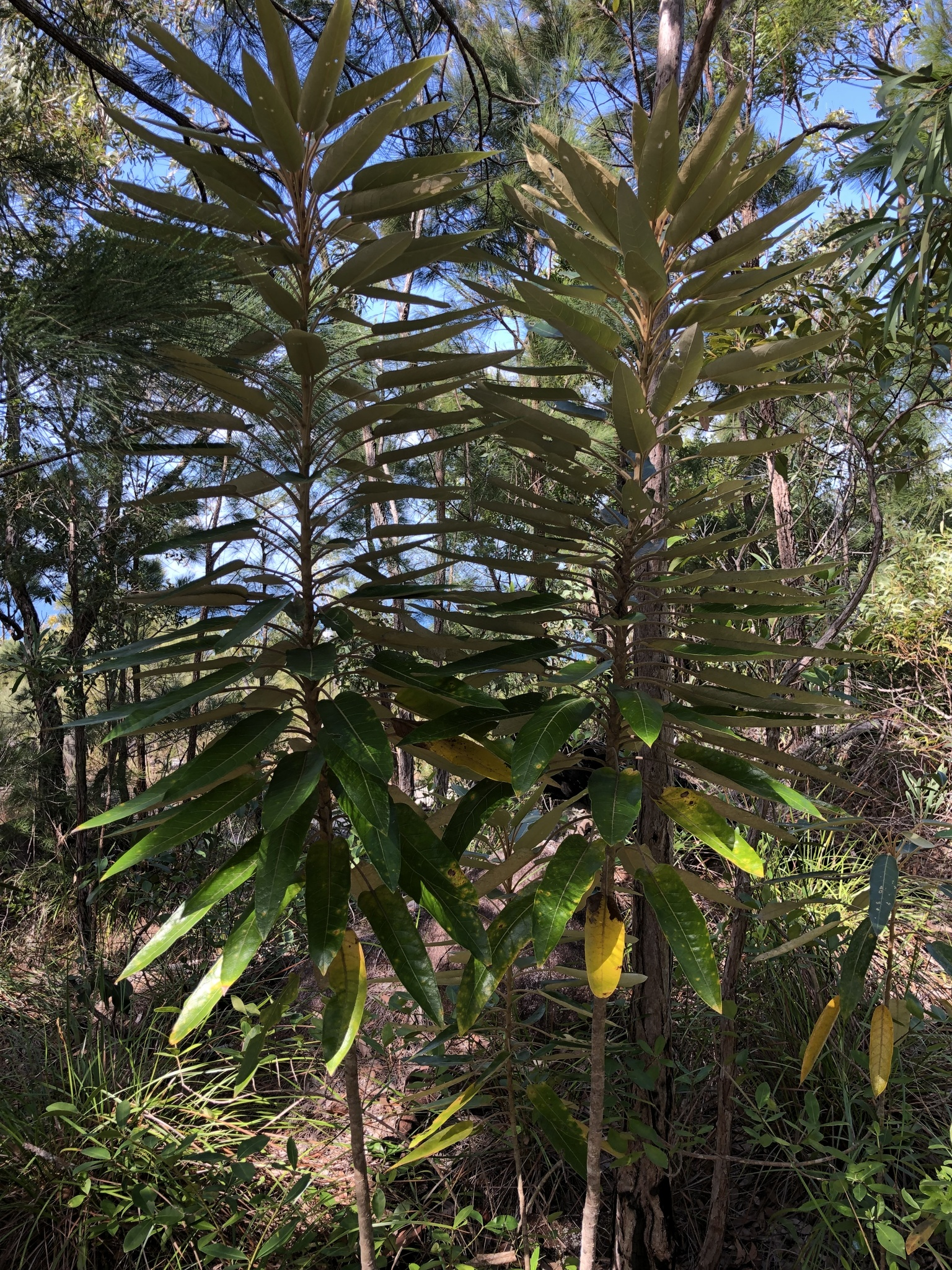
Twin stems

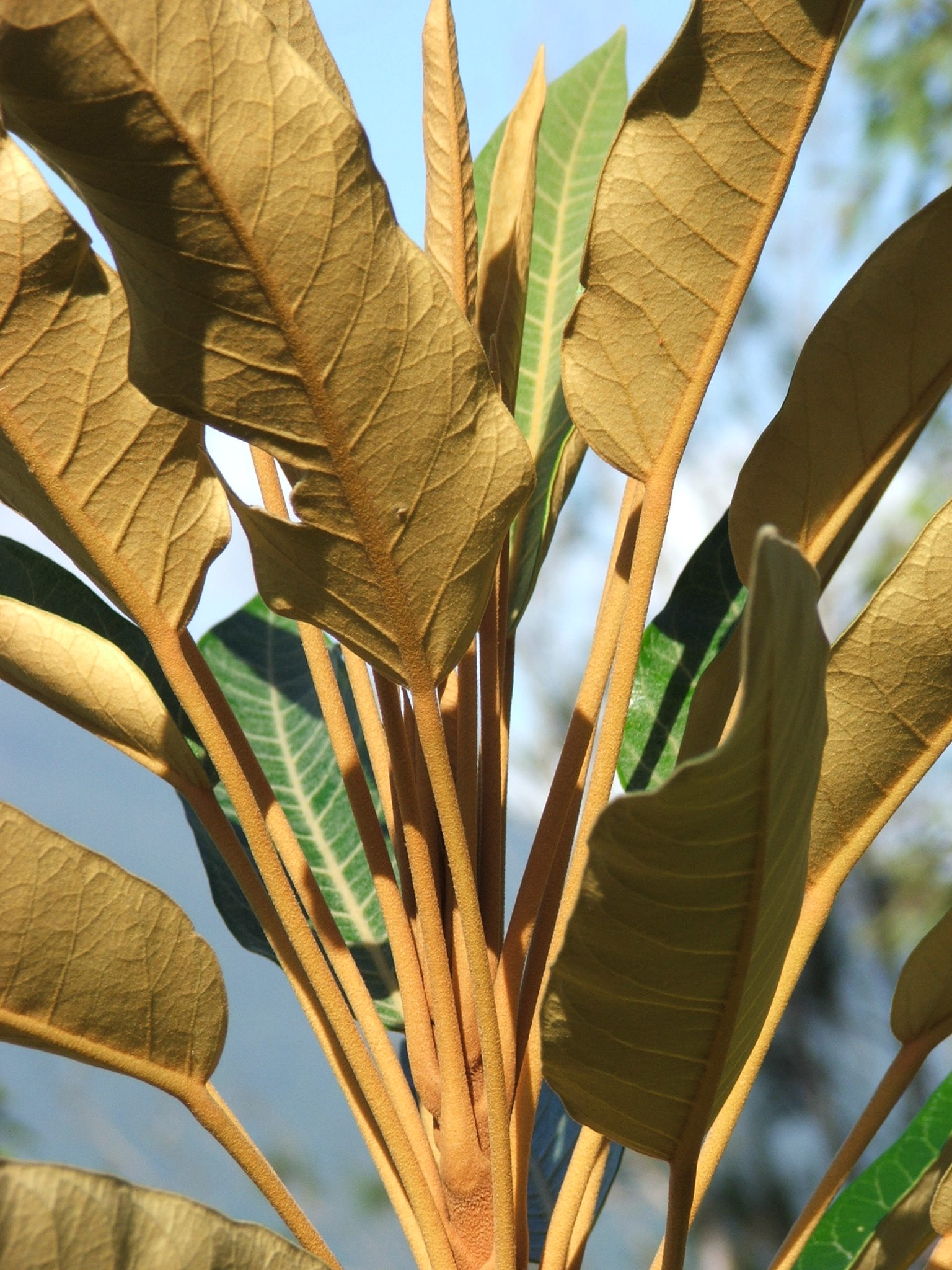
Indumentum on the leaves

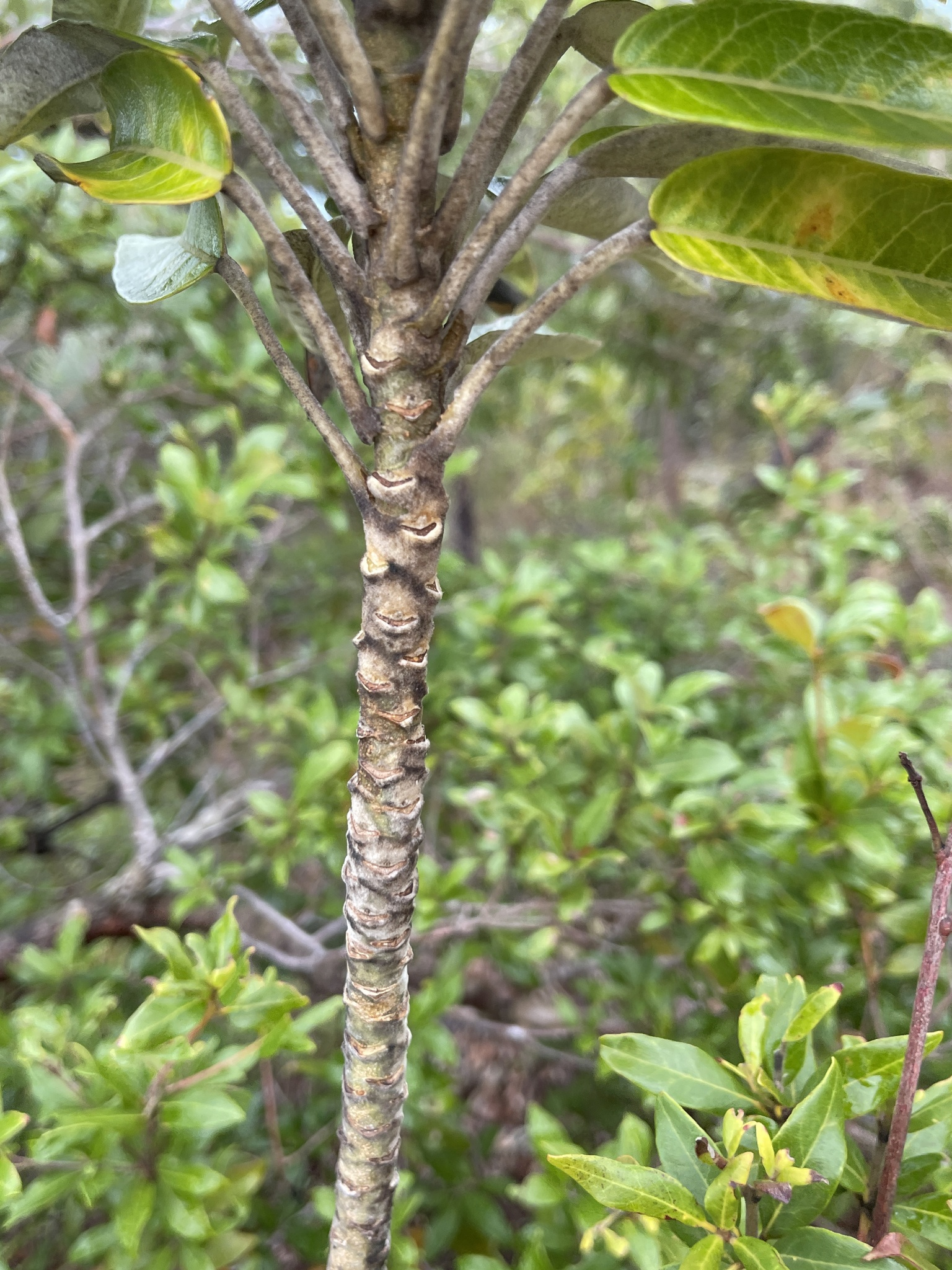
Lower stem with leaf scars
