= Herveys Range =

Mountains in NSW, Australia

Coordinates: 32°44′S 148°20′E

The Herveys Range is a mountain range in New South Wales, Australia.

The Parkes Radio Telescope, formerly the largest dish in the Southern Hemisphere and featured in the popular Australian movie The Dish, is located right in front of the Hervey Range.

== See also ==
- Goobang National Park – National park in New South Wales, Australia
