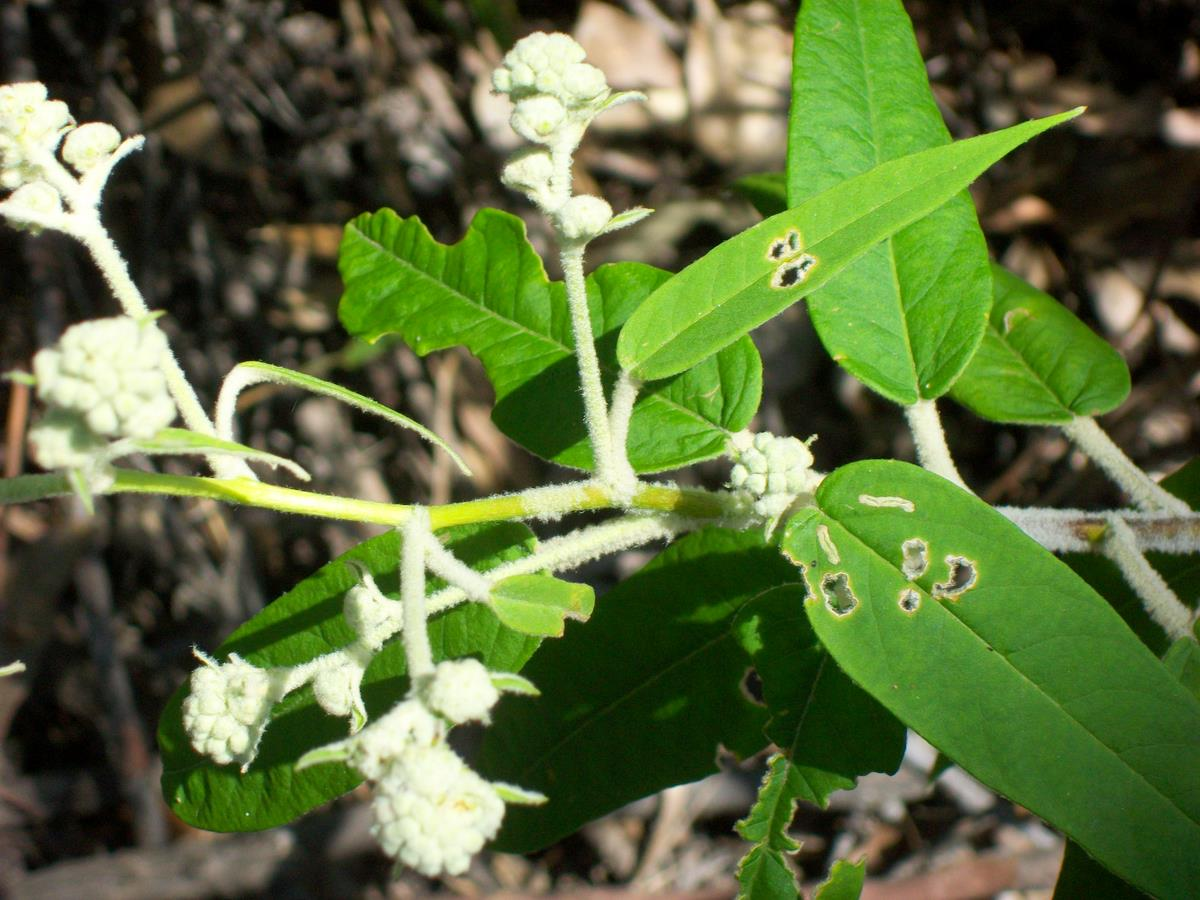
- Ku-ring-gai Chase National Park, Australia

Scientific classification
- Kingdom: Plantae
- Clade: Tracheophytes
- Clade: Angiosperms
- Clade: Eudicots
- Clade: Asterids
- Order: Apiales
- Family: Araliaceae
- Genus: Astrotricha
- Species: A. floccosa

Binomial name
- Astrotricha floccosa DC.

= Astrotricha floccosa =

Flannel leaf

Species of flowering plant

Astrotricha floccosa, known as the flannel leaf, is a plant found in eastern Australia. An erect shrub usually seen around 2 metres tall. Though it can grow to 4 metres tall.

The generic name comes from the Greek, meaning “star hairs”, referring to the covering of star like hairs. Floccosa is from the Latin, meaning woolly. The underside of the leaves and stems feature woolly white hairs.

It grows on poor soils in dry sclerophyll eucalyptus areas near Sydney, and as far west as Springwood in the lower Blue Mountains. Leaves are fairly narrow, 7.5 to 27 cm long, 2 to 5 cm wide, leaf stalks usually 10 to 30 mm long. Stalks of the similar Astrotricha latifolia are longer.
