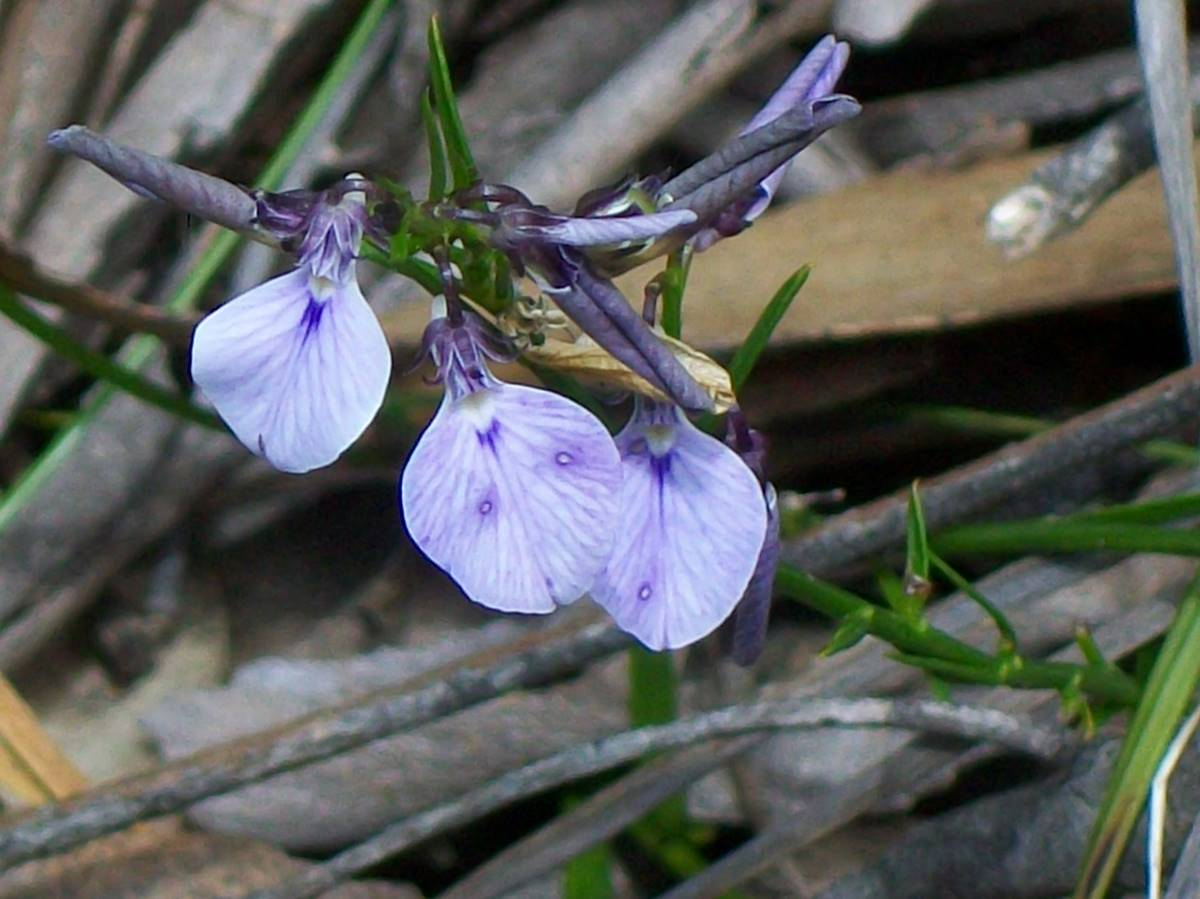
- In Ku-ring-gai Chase National Park, Australia

Scientific classification
- Kingdom: Plantae
- Clade: Tracheophytes
- Clade: Angiosperms
- Clade: Eudicots
- Clade: Rosids
- Order: Malpighiales
- Family: Violaceae
- Genus: Hybanthus
- Species: H. monopetalus

Binomial name
- Hybanthus monopetalus (Schult.) Domin

= Hybanthus monopetalus =

Species of plant

Hybanthus monopetalus, the slender violet-bush, is a common plant in the violet family. It is found in eastern Australia in dry eucalyptus woodland, often in sandstone or granite derived soils, where it is seen growing in relatively shady moist sites, surrounded by dry open country. It may reach 30 cm in height. Flowers form on short racemes at the end of branches. The specific epithet monopetalus translates to "one petal".
