= Schweiggeria mexicana =

Scientific classification
- Kingdom: Plantae
- Clade: Tracheophytes
- Clade: Angiosperms
- Clade: Eudicots
- Clade: Rosids
- Order: Malpighiales
- Family: Violaceae
- Genus: Schweiggeria
- Species: S. mexicana

Binomial name
- Schweiggeria mexicana Schltdl.

Synonyms
- Glossarrhen mexicanus (Schltdl.) Steud.

Species of plant

Schweiggeria mexicana is a species of flowering plant in the family Violaceae. It is endemic to the state of Veracruz in eastern Mexico. It grows primarily in the wet tropical biome.
