= Allexis zygomorpha =

Conservation status
- Vulnerable (IUCN 3.1)

Scientific classification
- Kingdom: Plantae
- Clade: Tracheophytes
- Clade: Angiosperms
- Clade: Eudicots
- Clade: Rosids
- Order: Malpighiales
- Family: Violaceae
- Genus: Allexis
- Species: A. zygomorpha

Binomial name
- Allexis zygomorpha Achound. & Onana

Species of flowering plant

Allexis zygomorpha is a species of plant in the family Violaceae. It is endemic to Cameroon. It is a shrub or tree and grows in the wet tropical biome.
