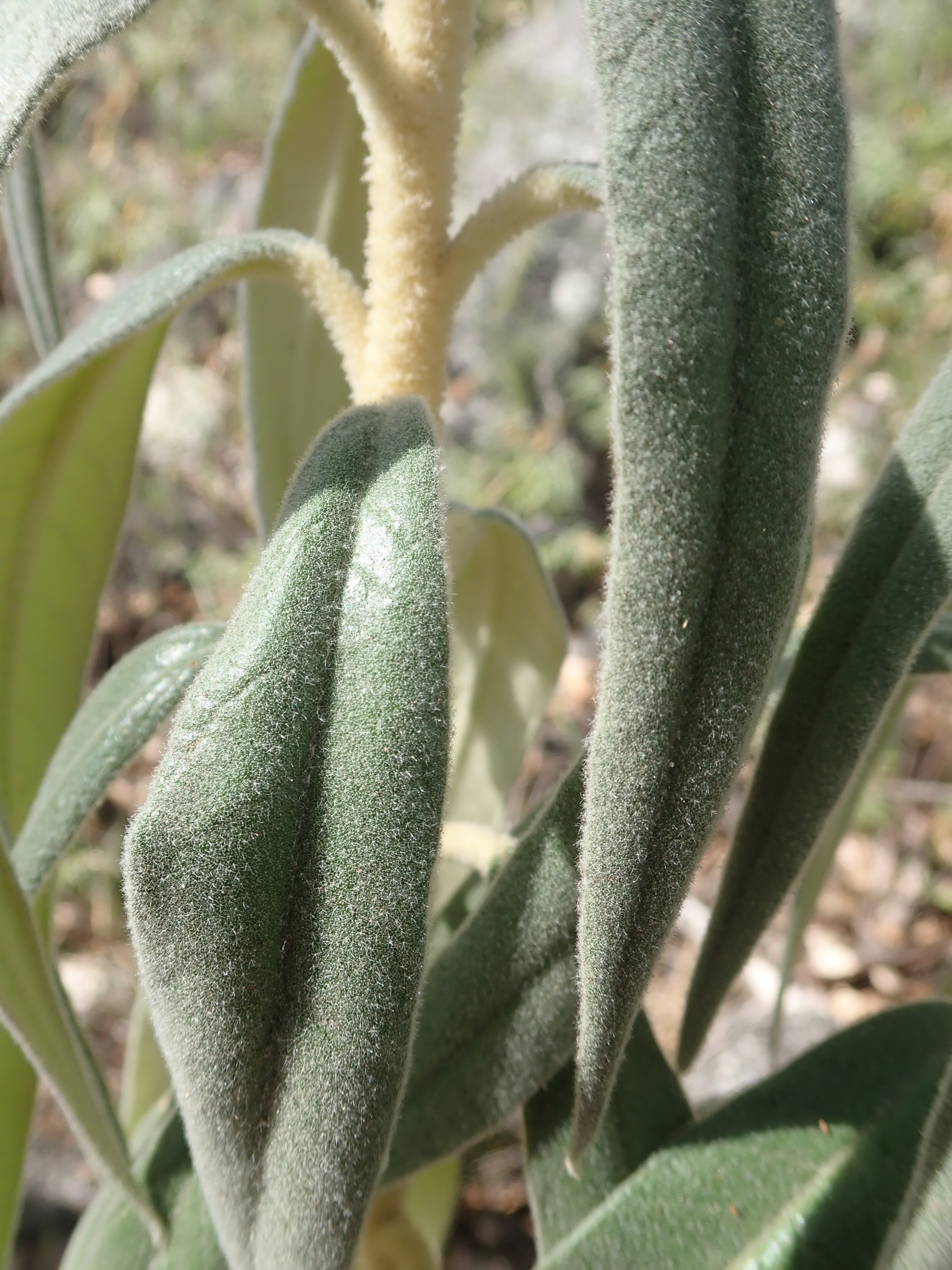
- (younger leaves)
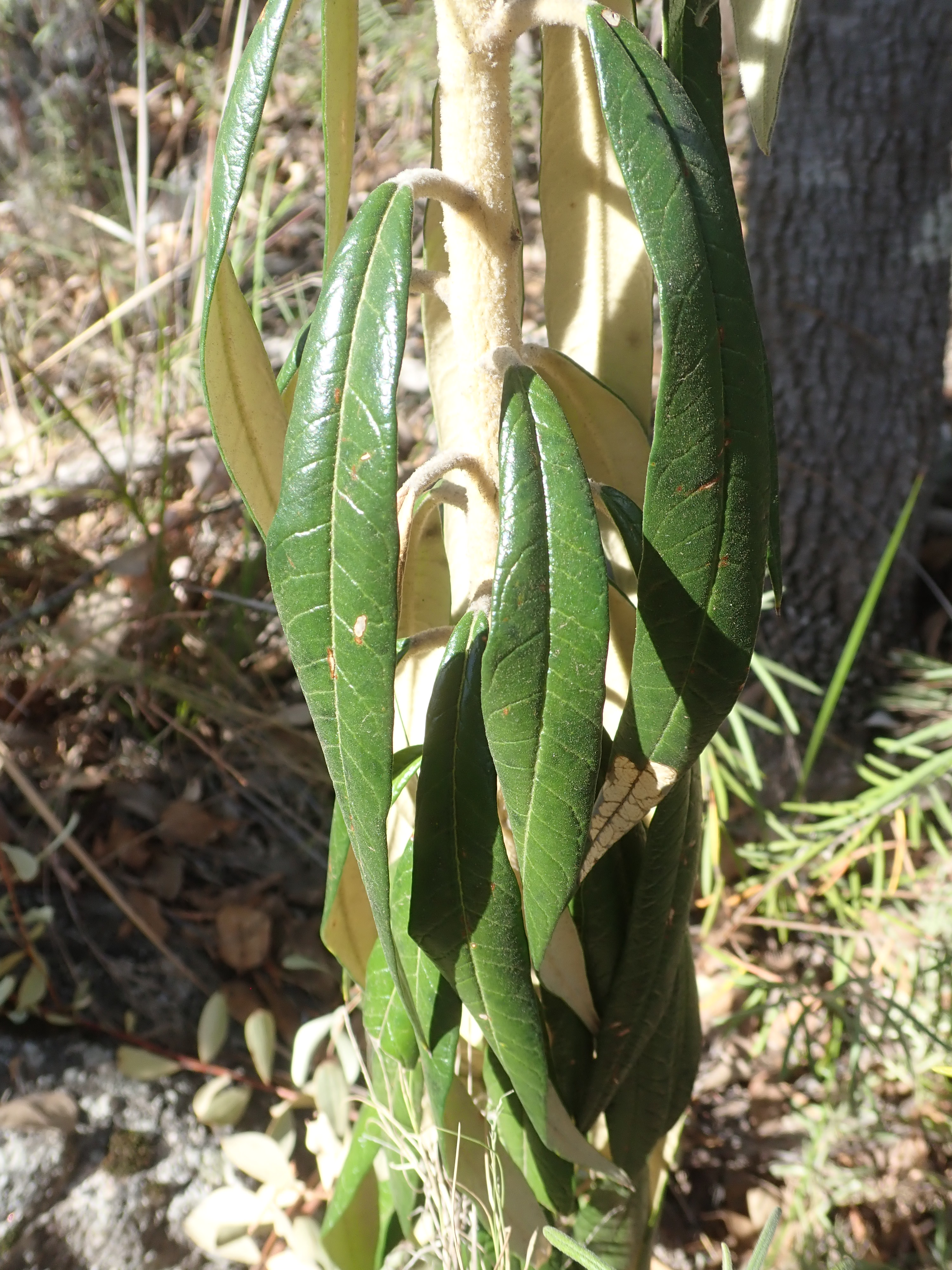
- (older leaves)

Conservation status
- Endangered (EPBC Act)

Scientific classification
- Kingdom: Plantae
- Clade: Tracheophytes
- Clade: Angiosperms
- Clade: Eudicots
- Clade: Asterids
- Order: Apiales
- Family: Araliaceae
- Genus: Astrotricha
- Species: A. roddii

Binomial name
- Astrotricha roddii Makinson

= Astrotricha roddii =

Species of plant

Astrotricha roddii is a plant in the Araliaceae family, native to the North Western Slopes of New South Wales, which was first described in 1991 by Robert Makinson.

The species epithet honours the botanist, Tony Rodd, who first collected and discovered the species.

It is found in dry sclerophyll woodland on granite outcrops on the North Western Slopes of New South Wales, and is listed by the Commonwealth as an endangered species.
