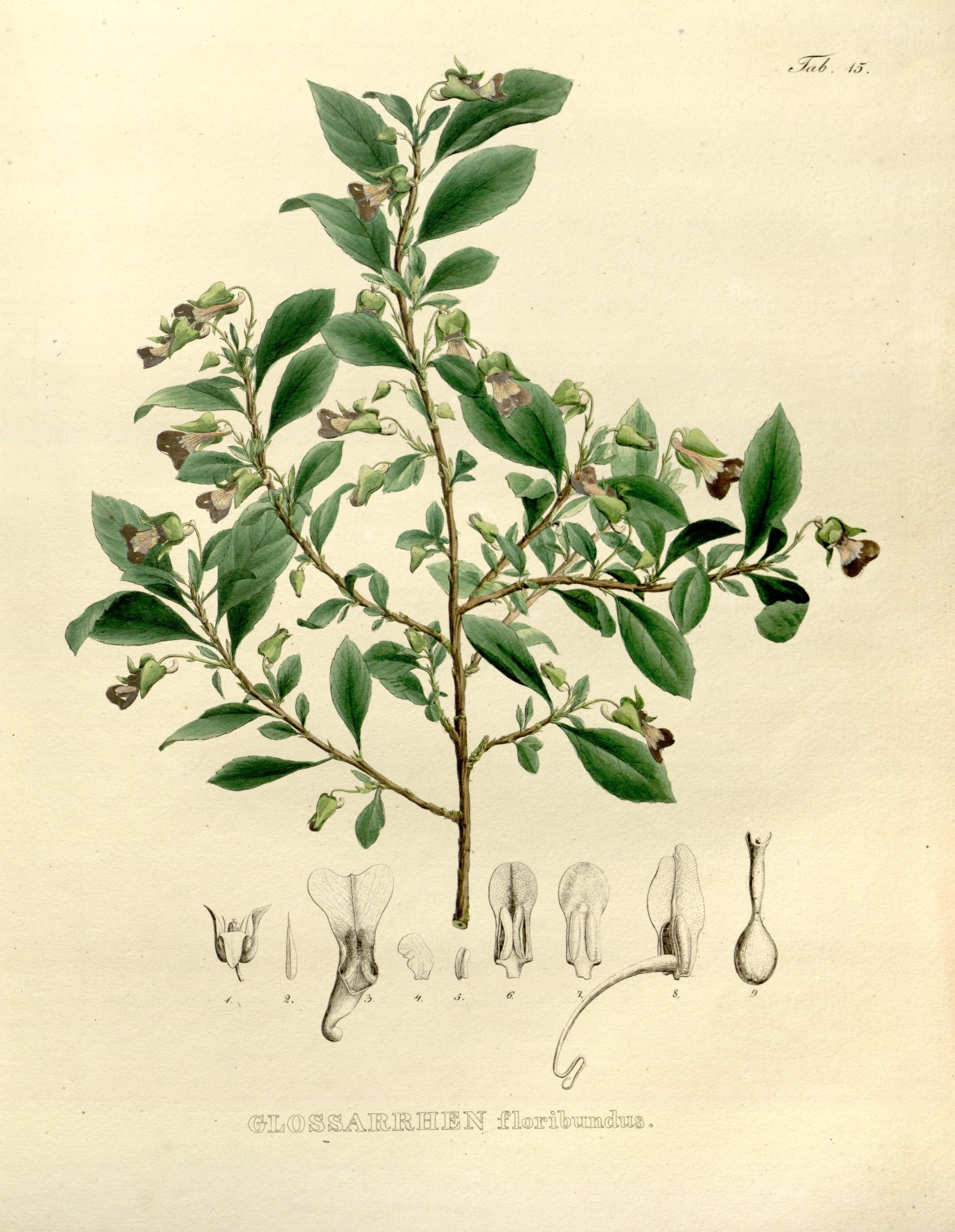

Scientific classification
- Kingdom: Plantae
- Clade: Tracheophytes
- Clade: Angiosperms
- Clade: Eudicots
- Clade: Rosids
- Order: Malpighiales
- Family: Violaceae
- Genus: Schweiggeria
- Species: S. fruticosa

Binomial name
- Schweiggeria fruticosa Spreng.

= Schweiggeria fruticosa =

Species of plant

Schweiggeria fruticosa is a species of plant in the family Violaceae. It's native range is Eastern Brazil. It grows primarily in the tropical biome.
