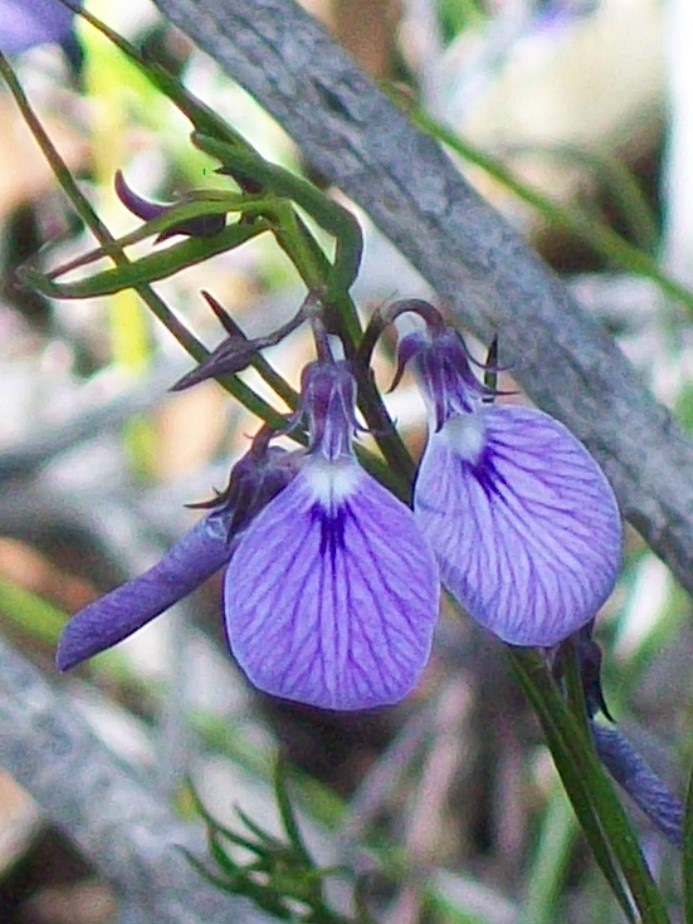
- Ku-ring-gai Chase National Park, Australia

Scientific classification
- Kingdom: Plantae
- Clade: Tracheophytes
- Clade: Angiosperms
- Clade: Eudicots
- Clade: Rosids
- Order: Malpighiales
- Family: Violaceae
- Genus: Hybanthus
- Species: H. vernonii

Binomial name
- Hybanthus vernonii (F.Muell.) F.Muell.

Synonyms
- Ionidium vernonii F.Muell.

= Hybanthus vernonii =

Species of flowering plant

Hybanthus vernonii, the erect violet, is a small plant in the violet family. Found in eastern Australia in eucalyptus woodland, often in sheltered sites on sandstone based soils.

Two subspecies are recognised

- sub-species vernonii
- sub-species scaber
