= Allexis batangae =

Scientific classification
- Kingdom: Plantae
- Clade: Tracheophytes
- Clade: Angiosperms
- Clade: Eudicots
- Clade: Rosids
- Order: Malpighiales
- Family: Violaceae
- Genus: Allexis
- Species: A. batangae

Binomial name
- Allexis batangae (Engl.) Melch.

Species of flowering plant

Allexis batangae is a species of plant in the family Violaceae. It is found in Cameroon and Gabon. It is a shrub or tree and grows in the wet tropical biome.
