= Allexis obanensis =

Conservation status
- Vulnerable (IUCN 2.3)

Scientific classification
- Kingdom: Plantae
- Clade: Tracheophytes
- Clade: Angiosperms
- Clade: Eudicots
- Clade: Rosids
- Order: Malpighiales
- Family: Violaceae
- Genus: Allexis
- Species: A. obanensis

Binomial name
- Allexis obanensis (Baker f.) Melch.

Species of flowering plant

Allexis obanensis is a species of plant in the Violaceae family. It is found in Cameroon and Nigeria. It is threatened by habitat loss.
