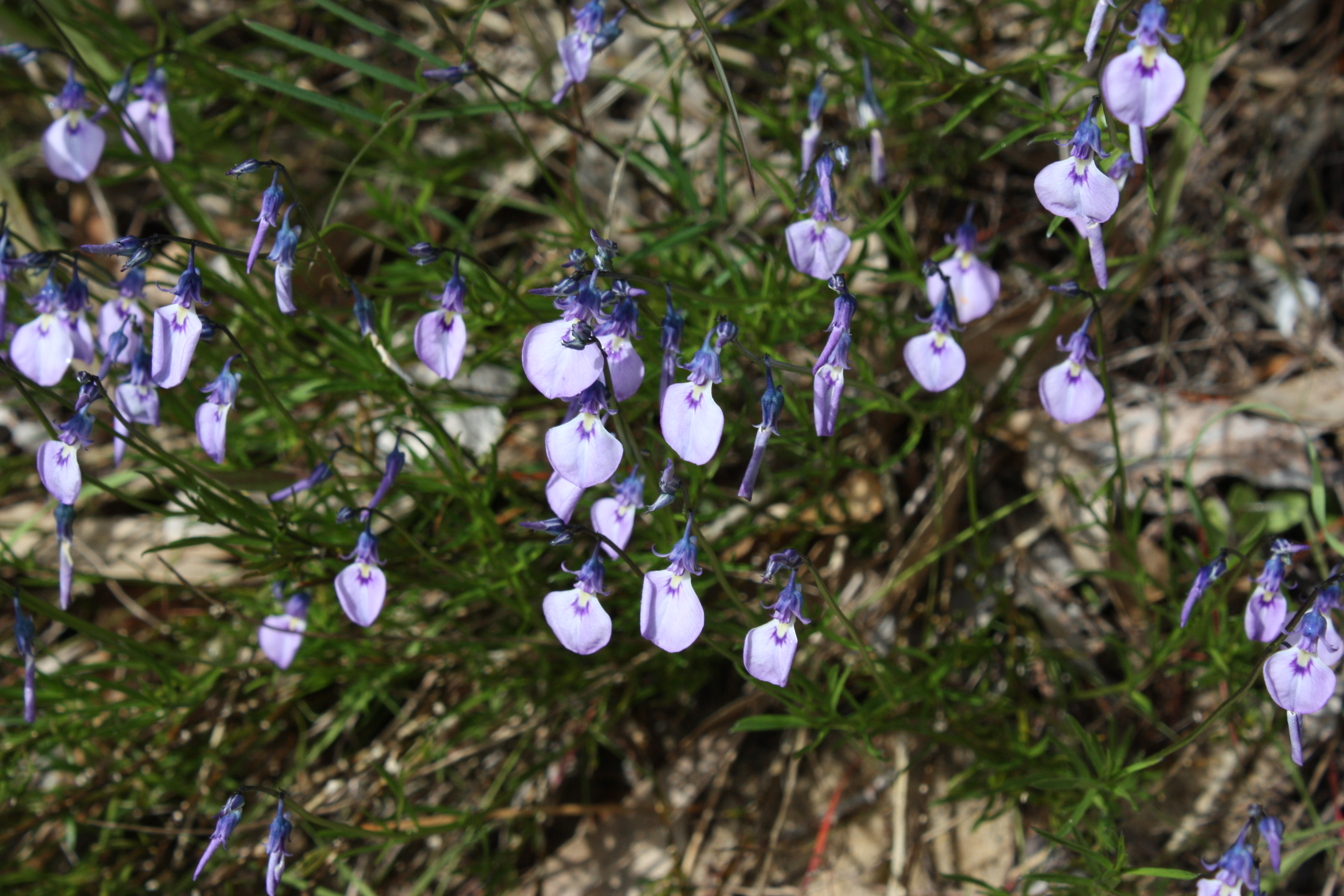

Scientific classification
- Kingdom: Plantae
- Clade: Tracheophytes
- Clade: Angiosperms
- Clade: Eudicots
- Clade: Rosids
- Order: Malpighiales
- Family: Violaceae
- Genus: Hybanthus
- Species: H. calycinus

Binomial name
- Hybanthus calycinus (DC.) F.Muell.

Synonyms
- Calceolaria calycina (DC.) Kuntze nom. illeg.; Ionidium glaucum (Endl.) Steud.; Pigea glauca Endl.; Ionidium calycinum (DC.) Steud.; Solea calycina (DC.) Spreng.; Vlamingia australasiaca de Vriese

= Hybanthus calycinus =

Species of flowering plant

Hybanthus calycinus (wild violet) is a perennial herb of the violet family, Violaceae. The species is endemic to the south-west of Western Australia.

It is 20 to 60 mm high and has leaves which are 20 to 45 mm long. Racemes of 5 or more mauve flowers are produced between June and October in the species' native range. It is commonly found in coastal areas on sandy soils in banksia woodland and shrubland communities.

The species was first formally described in 1824 by botanist Augustin Pyramus de Candolle in Prodomus. In 1876, botanist Ferdinand von Mueller transferred it to the genus Hybanthus in Fragmenta Phytographiae Australiae.
