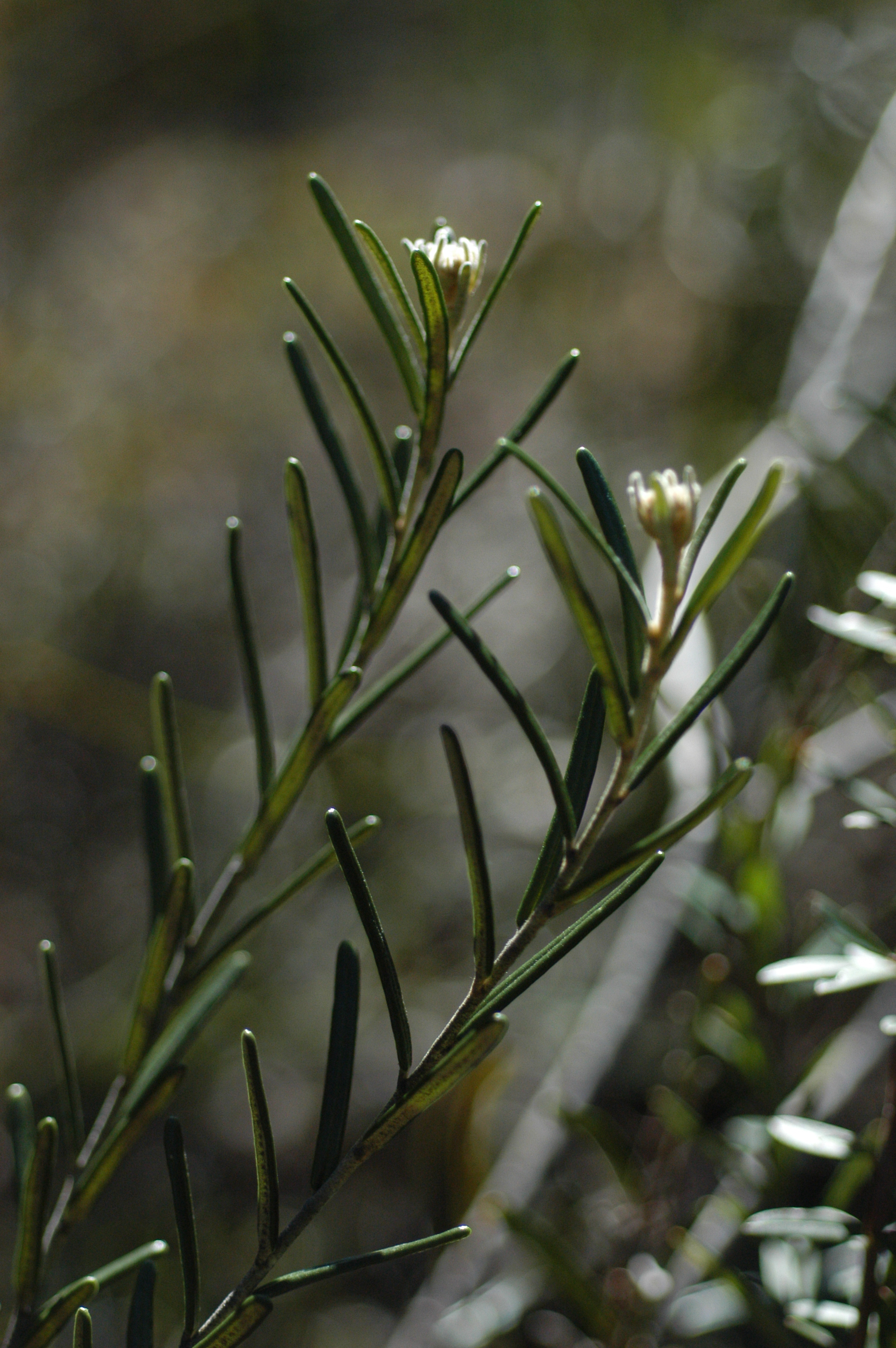
- Astrotricha crassifolia

Scientific classification
- Kingdom: Plantae
- Clade: Tracheophytes
- Clade: Angiosperms
- Clade: Eudicots
- Clade: Asterids
- Order: Apiales
- Family: Araliaceae
- Subfamily: Aralioideae
- Genus: Astrotricha; DC.

Species
- See text

Synonyms
- Hexocenia Calest.

= Astrotricha =

Genus of flowering plants

Astrotricha is a genus of shrubs in the ivy family Araliaceae endemic to Australia. It contains about 20 described species and a number of undescribed ones, and the genus is mostly confined to Victoria, New South Wales and Queensland with one species found in Western Australia.

== Description ==
Plants in this genus are erect shrubs that are either single-stemmed (subgenus Hexocenia) or bushy (subgenus Astrotricha). Leaves are often cordate and usually laneolate or linear, and often covered in a dense indumentum. Inflorescences are usually terminal panicles composed of umbels.

== Species ==
As of June 2024, Plants of the World Online recognises 20 species, as follows:

- Astrotricha asperifolia F.Muell. ex Klatt
- Astrotricha biddulphiana F.Muell.
- Astrotricha brachyandraA.R.Bean
- Astrotricha cordata A.R.Bean
- Astrotricha crassifolia Blakely - thick-leaf star-hair
- Astrotricha floccosa DC. - flannel leaf
- Astrotricha glabra Domin
- Astrotricha hamptonii F.Muell.
- Astrotricha intermedia A.R.Bean
- Astrotricha latifolia Benth.
- Astrotricha ledifolia DC. - common star-hair
- Astrotricha linearis A.Cunn. ex Benth. - narrow-leaf star-hair
- Astrotricha longifolia Benth.
- Astrotricha obovata Makinson
- Astrotricha obtusifolia Gand.
- Astrotricha parvifolia N.A.Wakef.
- Astrotricha pauciflora A.R.Bean
- Astrotricha pterocarpa Benth.
- Astrotricha roddii Makinson
- Astrotricha umbrosa A.R.Bean

In addition, the Australian Plant Census lists the following provisional names:

- Astrotricha sp. Deua (R.O.Makinson 1647)
- Astrotricha sp. Howe Range (D.E.Albrecht 1054)
- Astrotricha sp. Mount Boss (P.Gilmour 7907)
- Astrotricha sp. Mt Zero (V.Stajsic 4204)
- Astrotricha sp. Quorrobolong (S.Lewer 40)
- Astrotricha sp. Suggan Buggan (J.Turner 211)
- Astrotricha sp. Victoria Range (J.A.Jeanes 2095 & D.Naqvi)
- Astrotricha sp. Wallagaraugh (R.O.Makinson 1228)
- Astrotricha sp. Watchimbark (P.Gilmour 7938)
- Astrotricha sp. Wingan Inlet (J.A.Jeanes 2268)
