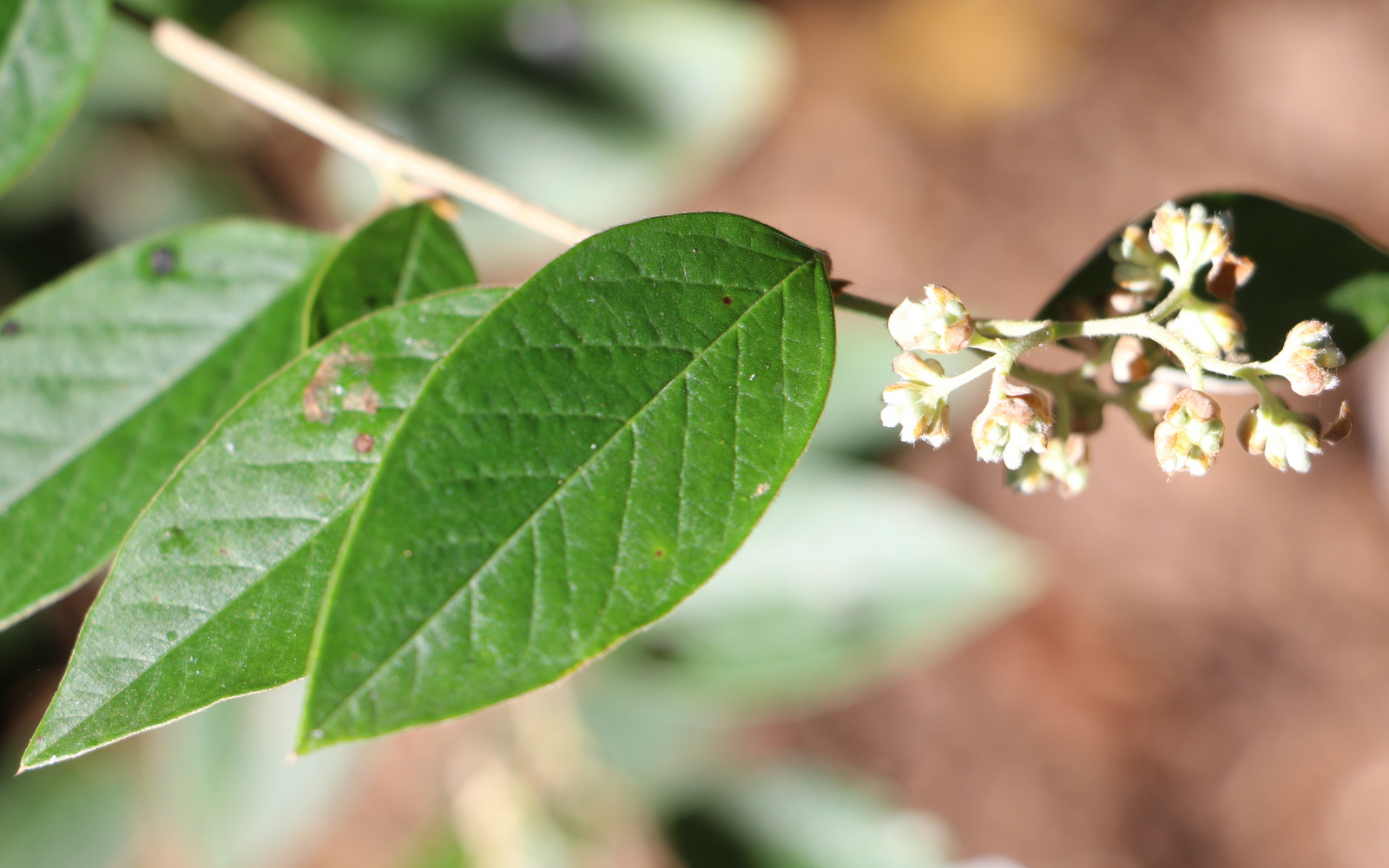
- Pomaderris queenslandica in Mount Annan Botanic Garden

Scientific classification
- Kingdom: Plantae
- Clade: Tracheophytes
- Clade: Angiosperms
- Clade: Eudicots
- Clade: Rosids
- Order: Rosales
- Family: Rhamnaceae
- Genus: Pomaderris
- Species: P. queenslandica

Binomial name
- Pomaderris queenslandica C.T.White

= Pomaderris queenslandica =

Scant pomaderris

Species of flowering plant

Pomaderris queenslandica, commonly known as scant pomaderris, is a species of flowering plant in the family Rhamnaceae and is endemic to eastern Australia. It is a shrub with woolly-hairy stems, egg-shaped to narrowly elliptic leaves, and panicles of creamy-yellow flowers.

== Description ==
Pomaderris queenslandica is a shrub that typically grows to a height of 2–3 m (6 ft 7 in – 9 ft 10 in) and has its stems covered with woolly, white, star-shaped hairs. Its leaves are egg-shaped to narrowly elliptic, 25–70 mm (0.98–2.76 in) long and 10–25 mm (0.39–0.98 in) wide. The upper surface of the leaves is glabrous and the lower surface is covered with whitish, woolly hairs. The flowers are creamy-yellow, borne at the ends of branchlets in panicles with egg-shaped bracts 5–6 mm (0.20–0.24 in) long at the base, but that fall off as the flowers open. The sepals, floral cup and fruit are covered with long, silvery, and woolly, star-shaped hairs. Flowering occurs in spring and summer.

== Taxonomy ==
Pomaderris queenslandica was first formally described in 1951 by Cyril Tenison White in The Queensland Naturalist from specimens he collected at Back Creek, near Canungra in 1931.

== Distribution and habitat ==
Scant pomaderris grows in moist forest or the understorey of sheltered woodland in south-eastern Queensland and in scattered locations on the north coast and Northern Tablelands of north-eastern New South Wales.

== Conservation status ==
This pomaderris is listed as of "least concern" under the Queensland Government Nature Conservation Act 1992 but as "endangered" in New South Wales under the Biodiversity Conservation Act 2016.
