= Allexis =

Scientific classification
- Kingdom: Plantae
- Clade: Tracheophytes
- Clade: Angiosperms
- Clade: Eudicots
- Clade: Rosids
- Order: Malpighiales
- Family: Violaceae
- Subfamily: Violoideae
- Tribe: Rinoreeae
- Subtribe: Rinoreinae
- Genus: Allexis; Pierre (1898)

Genus of flowering plants

Allexis is a genus of plants in the family Violaceae. It includes four species native to tropical Africa, ranging from Nigeria through Cameroon and Gabon to Republic of the Congo.

Four species are accepted.

- Allexis batangae (Engl.) Melch.
- Allexis cauliflora (Oliver) Pierre
- Allexis obanensis (Baker f.) Melch.
- Allexis zygomorpha Achound. & Onana
