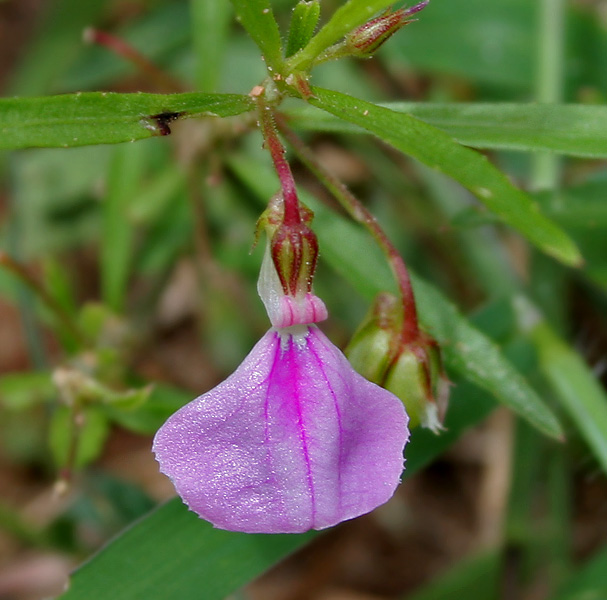
- Hybanthus enneaspermus at Talakona forest, in Chittoor District of Andhra Pradesh, India

Scientific classification
- Kingdom: Plantae
- Clade: Tracheophytes
- Clade: Angiosperms
- Clade: Eudicots
- Clade: Rosids
- Order: Malpighiales
- Family: Violaceae
- Subfamily: Violoideae
- Tribe: Violeae
- Genus: Hybanthus; Jacq.

Species
- See text

Synonyms
- Acentra Phil.; Calceolaria Loefl.; Clelandia J.M.Black; Cubelium Raf. ex Britton & A.Br.; Ionidium Vent.

= Hybanthus =

Genus of flowering plants

Hybanthus (green-violet) is a genus of flowering plants in the family Violaceae. This genus name is Greek for "humpback flower", referring to the drooping pedicels of plants that are part of this genus. The genus is grossly polyphyletic and may contain up to nine different genera, of which Pombalia Vand., Cubelium Raf. and Pigea DC. have been previously recognised.

== Species ==
Hybanthus contains the following species:

- Hybanthus attenuatus
- Hybanthus aurantiacus (Benth.) F.Muell.
- Hybanthus calycinus (DC.) F.Muell.
- Hybanthus concolor
- Hybanthus cymulosus C.A.Gardner
- Hybanthus debilissimus F.Muell.
- Hybanthus enneaspermus (L.) F.Muell.
- Hybanthus epacroides (L.) Melch.
- Hybanthus floribundus (Lindl.) F.Muell.
- Hybanthus linearifolius
- Hybanthus monopetalus (Schult.) Domin
- Hybanthus stellarioides (Domin) P.I.Forst.
- Hybanthus vernonii (F.Muell.) F.Muell.
- Hybanthus verticillatus
- Hybanthus volubilis E.M.Benn.

== Bibliography ==
- POTWO. "Hybanthus Jacq". Plants of the World Online. Royal Botanic Gardens, Kew.
