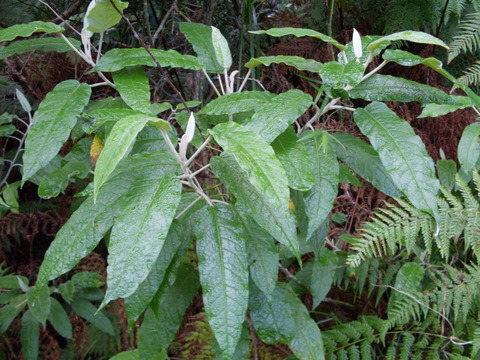
- Leaves near Elvina Bay

Scientific classification
- Kingdom: Plantae
- Clade: Tracheophytes
- Clade: Angiosperms
- Clade: Eudicots
- Clade: Asterids
- Order: Apiales
- Family: Araliaceae
- Genus: Astrotricha
- Species: A. latifolia

Binomial name
- Astrotricha latifolia Benth.

Synonyms
- List: Astrotricha floccosa var. incana Benth.; Astrotricha floccosa var. latifolia (Benth.) Domin nom. illeg., nom. superfl.; Astrotriche floccosa var. incana Benth. orth. var.; Astrotriche latifolia Benth. orth. var.; Astrotricha floccosa auct. non DC.: Mueller, F.J.H. von (1882); Astrotricha floccosa auct. non DC.: Bailey, F.M. (1883); Astrotricha floccosa auct. non DC.: Mueller, F.J.H. von (December 1889); Astrotricha floccosa auct. non DC.: Bailey, F.M. (1900); Astrotricha floccosa auct. non DC.: Bailey, F.M. (1913); Astrotricha floccosa auct. non DC.: Stanley, T.D. in Stanley, T.D. & Ross, E.M. (1986); Astrotricha floccosa var. brevifolia auct. non F.Muell.

= Astrotricha latifolia =

Broad-leaf star-hair

Species of flowering plant

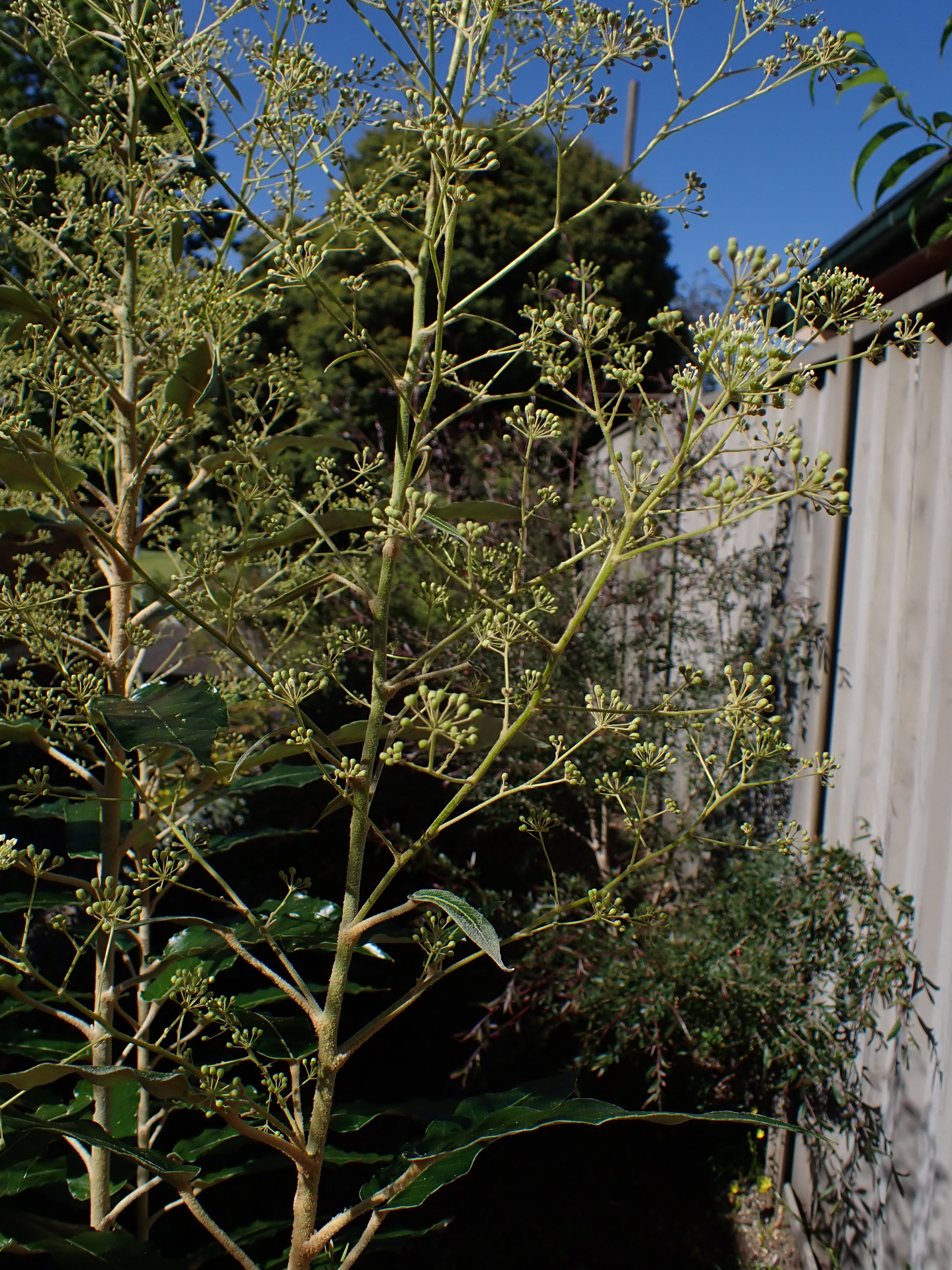
Inflorescences

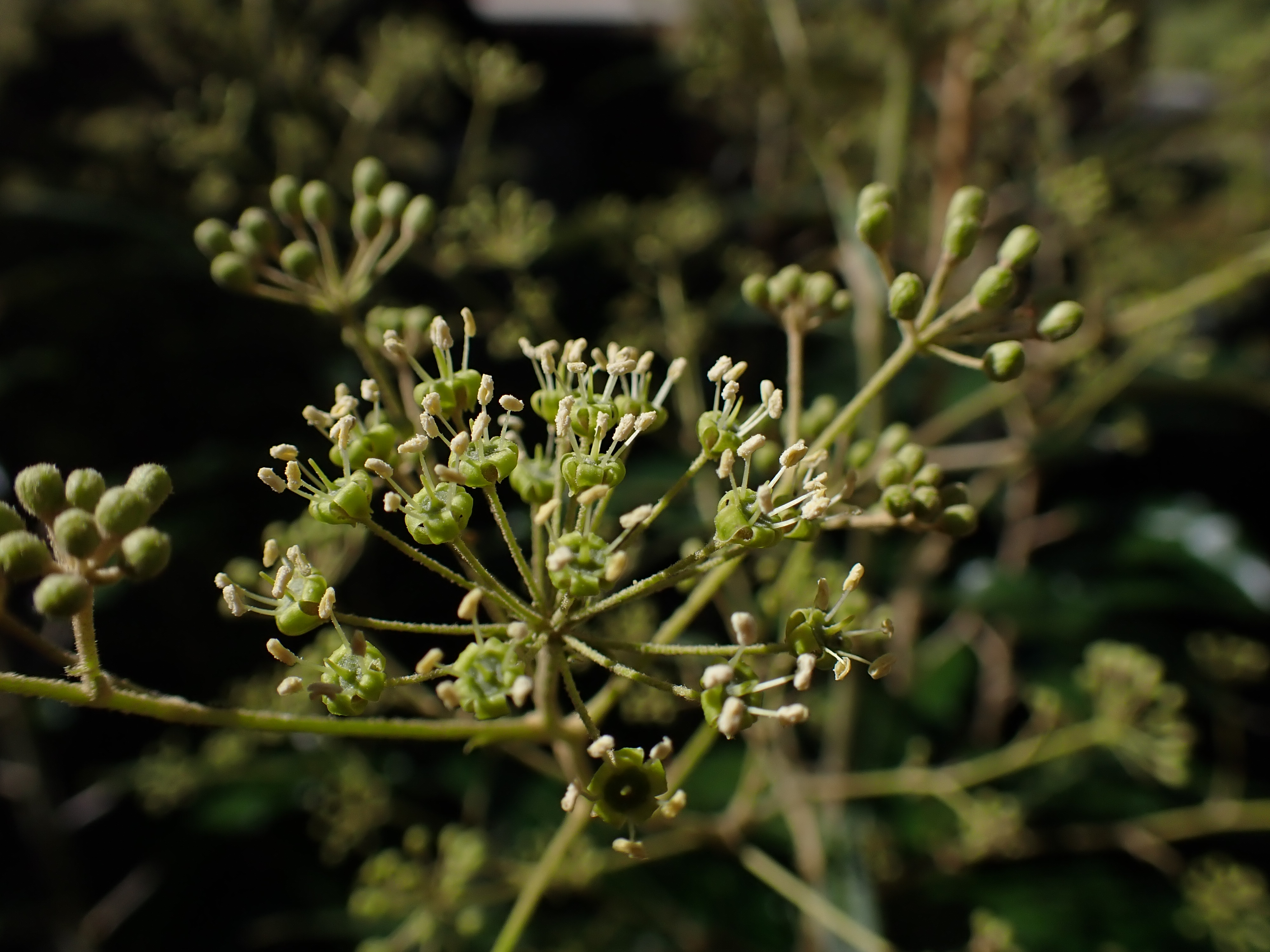
Flowers

Astrotricha latifolia, known as the broad-leaf star-hair, is a species of flowering plant in the Family Araliaceae and is endemic to eastern Australia. It is a large shrub with oblong to egg-shaped or elliptic leaves, and yellowish-green flowers.

== Description ==
Astrotricha latifolia is a large shrub that typically grows to a height of 2–4 m (6 ft 7 in – 13 ft 1 in), sometimes to 9 m (30 ft) and usually has many erect to spreading branches. Its young branches are covered with loose, fluffy hairs. The leaves are oblong to egg-shaped or elliptic, sometimes shield-shaped, 80–220 mm (3.1–8.7 in) long and 20–80 mm (0.79–3.15 in) wide on a petiole 25–80 mm (0.98–3.15 in) long. The upper surface of the leaves is smooth and green, the lower side sparsely hairy with the network of veins visible underneath. The flowers are borne in a large inflorescence up to 300 mm (12 in) long and are greenish-yellow. Flowering occursin October and November and the fruit is not winged.

== Taxonomy ==
Astrotricha latifolia was first formally described in 1837 by George Bentham in Enumeratio plantarum quas in Novae Hollandiae ora austro-occidentali ad fluvium Cygnorum et in sinu Regis Georgii collegit Carolus Liber Baro de Hügel. The specific epithet (latifolia) means 'broad-leaved'.

== Distribution and habitat ==
Broad-leaf star-hair grows in wet forests or the edges of rainforest from sea level to an altitude of 1,500 m (4,900 ft) in a wide variety of soil types and occurs from about Gympie in south-east Queensland to Narooma in southern coastal New South Wales and west to the Great Dividing Range
