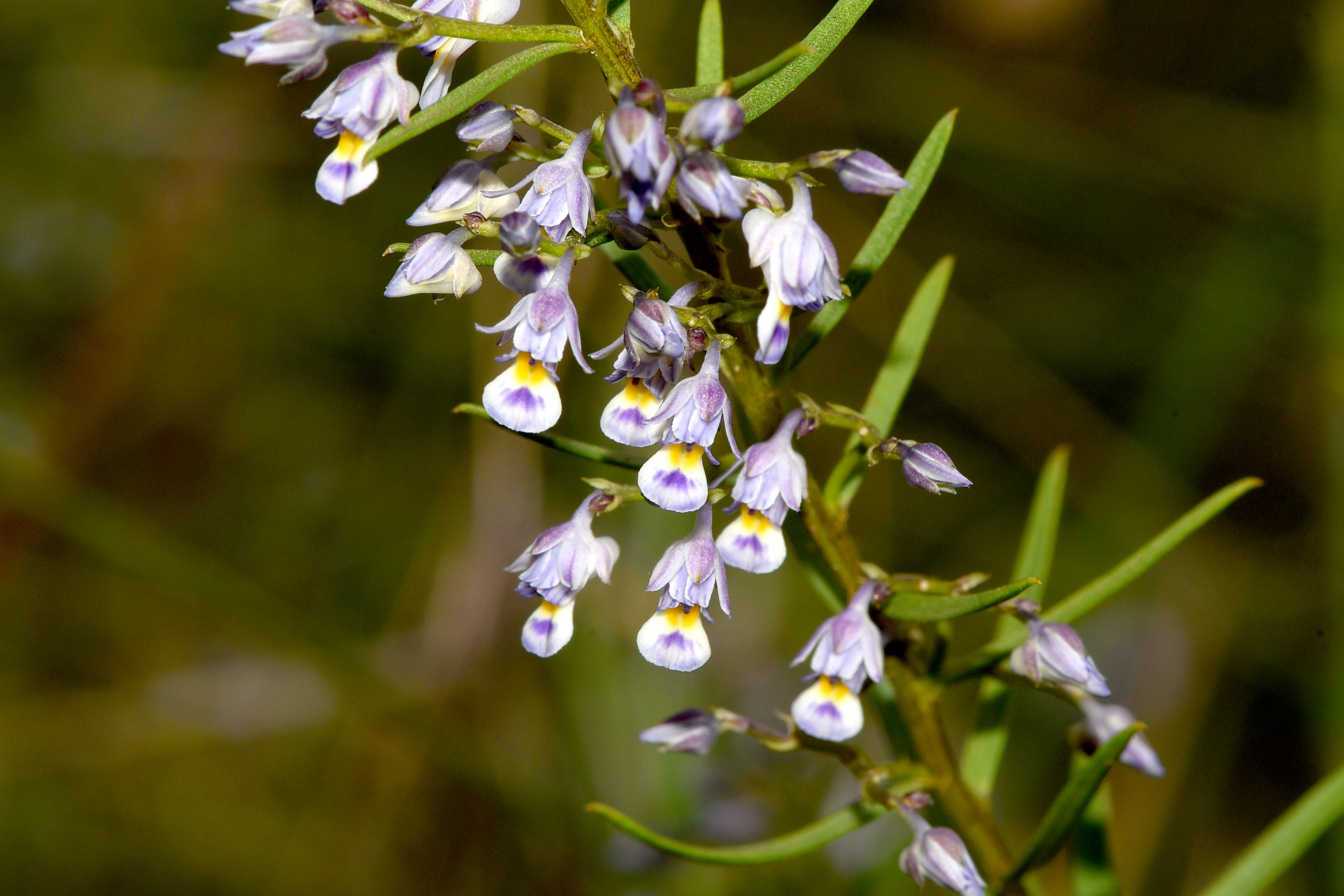

Scientific classification
- Kingdom: Plantae
- Clade: Tracheophytes
- Clade: Angiosperms
- Clade: Eudicots
- Clade: Rosids
- Order: Malpighiales
- Family: Violaceae
- Genus: Hybanthus
- Species: H. floribundus

Binomial name
- Hybanthus floribundus (Lindl.) F.Muell.

= Hybanthus floribundus =

Species of plant

Hybanthus floribundus (shrub violet) is a species of plant in the Violaceae family, found in southern Western Australia, southern South Australia, Victoria and southern New South Wales.

Hybanthus floribundus was first described as Pigea floribunda in 1838 by John Lindley, but was transferred to the genus, Hybanthus in 1876 by Ferdinand von Mueller. This taxon name is accepted by most Australian authorities, but not by Plants of the World Online nor VicFlora (both of which authorities consider Pigea floribunda as the accepted name).

It is a perennial shrub, growing from 15 cm to 2 m high. There are four subspecies, three of which have a restricted distribution in Western Australia, while the other is widespread.

== Distribution ==
In Western Australia, it is found in the IBRA regions: Avon Wheatbelt, Coolgardie, Esperance Plains, Geraldton Sandplains, Great Victoria Desert, Jarrah Forest, Mallee, Murchison, Swan Coastal Plain, and Yalgoo.
