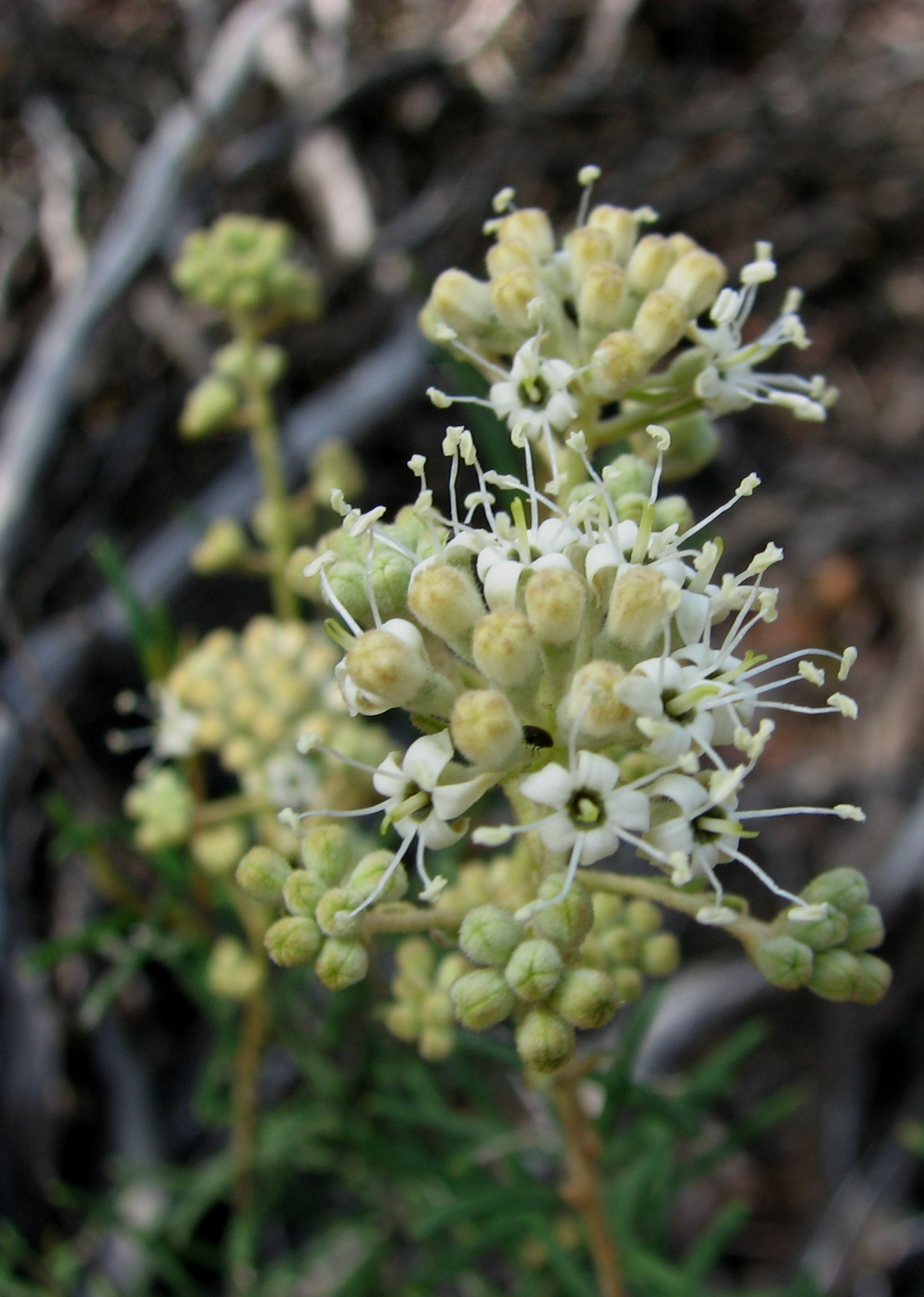

Scientific classification
- Kingdom: Plantae
- Clade: Tracheophytes
- Clade: Angiosperms
- Clade: Eudicots
- Clade: Asterids
- Order: Apiales
- Family: Araliaceae
- Genus: Astrotricha
- Species: A. linearis

Binomial name
- Astrotricha linearis A.Cunn. ex Benth.

= Astrotricha linearis =

Species of flowering plant

Astrotricha linearis, commonly known as the narrow-leaf star-hair, is a plant species in the family Araliaceae. The species is endemic to south-east Australia. Plants grow to 1.5 metres high and have linear leaves that are 20 to 65 mm long and 1 to 1.5 mm wide. Flowers appear between October and December in the species native range.

The species was formally described in 1837 based on plant material collected by Allan Cunningham near Bathurst.

It occurs naturally in heath or dry woodland in New South Wales and Victoria.
