= Rama Shanker Dubey =

Indian biochemist

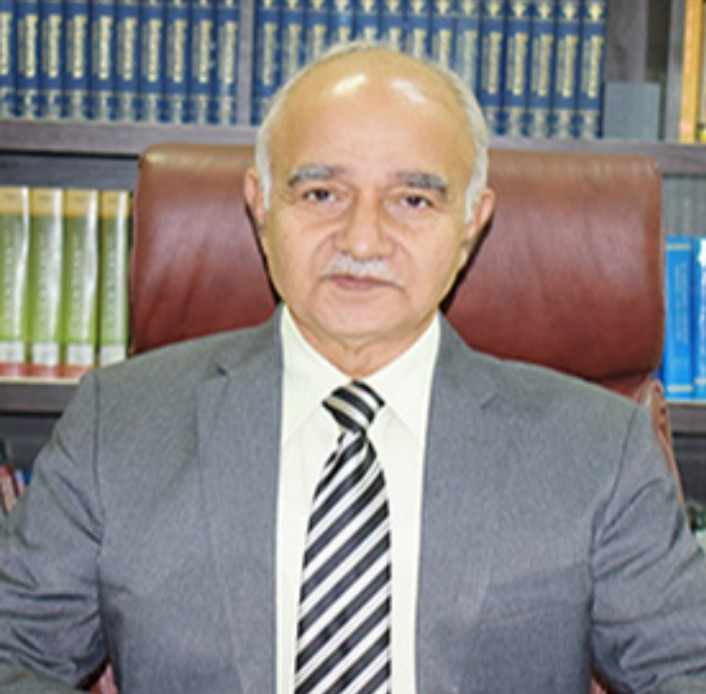

Chancellor of NIEPA
- Incumbent
- Assumed office 21 April 2026
- Preceded by: Prof. Mahesh Chandra Pant

Vice chancellor of Central University of Gujarat
- In office 22 November 2019 – 22 November 2025
- Preceded by: Prof. Syed Abdul Bari
- Succeeded by: Prof. Vijita Singh Aggarwal

Vice Chancellor of Tilka Manjhi Bhagalpur University
- In office 2014–2017
- Preceded by: Dr. N. K. Verma
- Succeeded by: Nalini Kant Jha

Personal details
- Born: 23 December 1955 (age 70) Sanisonakara, Bihar, India
- Education: Banaras Hindu University
- Occupation: Biochemist

Rama Shanker Dubey (born 23 December 1955) is a biochemist and academician, former vice chancellor of Tilka Manjhi Bhagalpur University and Central University of Gujarat, Kundhela, Vadodara.

== Early life and education ==
Rama Shanker Dubey was born on 23 December 1955 in Sanisonakara, Raghunathpur, Siwan district, Bihar.

He received his Master of Science degree in biochemistry in 1976 and his Doctor of Philosophy in biochemistry in 1980 from Banaras Hindu University.

== Career ==
He started his career as a scientist at Indian Council of Agricultural Research in 1978 and served there till 1983. After this, he was appointed as a lecturer at the Department of Biochemistry, Banaras Hindu University in year 1983 and served the same post till 1991. Thereafter, he became a reader (1991-1999), and a professor from 1999 to 2020. Subsequently, he served as the vice chancellor of Tilka Manjhi Bhagalpur University from 2014 to 2017. He was appointed as vice chancellor of the Central University of Gujarat on 22 November 2019 and served there till 22 November 2025.

== Research interests ==
His most cited article, "Reactive Oxygen Species, Oxidative Damage, and Antioxidative Defense Mechanism in Plants under Stressful Conditions", explores the role of reactive oxygen species and antioxidative defense mechanisms in plants under stressful conditions, contributing to our understanding of the molecular mechanisms underlying stress responses in plants.

"Lead Toxicity in Plants" is a review article that discusses the effects of lead contamination on plants. Lead, a potential soil pollutant, is readily absorbed by plants and can cause a number of toxicity symptoms, such as stunted growth, chlorosis, and root system blackening. The article explores the various morphological, physiological, and biochemical effects of lead toxicity and the mechanisms adopted by plants for lead detoxification and developing tolerance to it. Some of these mechanisms include sequestration of lead in the vacuole, phytochelatin synthesis, and binding to glutathione and amino acids. The article also highlights the potential of using phytoremediation and rhizofiltration technologies for cleaning lead-contaminated soils.
