= List of hyperaccumulators =

This article covers known hyperaccumulators, accumulators or species tolerant to the following: Aluminium (Al), Silver (Ag), Arsenic (As), Beryllium (Be), Chromium (Cr), Copper (Cu), Manganese (Mn), Mercury (Hg), Molybdenum (Mo), Naphthalene, Lead (Pb), Selenium (Se) and Zinc (Zn).

See also:

- Hyperaccumulators table – 2: Nickel
- Hyperaccumulators table – 3: Cd, Cs, Co, Pu, Ra, Sr, U, radionuclides, hydrocarbons, organic solvents, etc.

== Hyperaccumulators table – 1 ==
hyperaccumulators and contaminants : Al, Ag, As, Be, Cr, Cu, Mn, Hg, Mo, naphthalene, Pb, Se, Zn – accumulation rates
Contaminant	Accumulation rates (in mg/kg dry weight)	Binomial name	English name	H-Hyperaccumulator or A-Accumulator P-Precipitator T-Tolerant	Notes	Sources
Al	A-	Agrostis castellana	highland bentgrass	As(A), Mn(A), Pb(A), Zn(A)	Origin: Portugal.	
Al	1000	Hordeum vulgare	Barley		25 records of plants.	
Al		Hydrangea spp.	Hydrangea (a.k.a. Hortensia)			
Al	Aluminium concentrations in young leaves, mature leaves, old leaves, and roots were found to be 8.0, 9.2, 14.4, and 10.1 mg g1, respectively.	Melastoma malabathricum L.	Blue Tongue, or Native Lassiandra	P competes with Al and reduces uptake.		
Al		Solidago hispida (Solidago canadensis L.)	Hairy Goldenrod		Origin Canada.	
Al	100	Vicia faba	Horse Bean			
Ag	10-1200	Salix miyabeana	Willow	Ag(T)	Seemed able to adapt to high AgNO_{3} concentrations on a long timeline	
Ag		Brassica napus	Rapeseed plant	Cr, Hg, Pb, Se, Zn	Phytoextraction	
Ag		Salix spp.	Osier spp.	Cr, Hg, Se, petroleum hydrocarbures, organic solvents, MTBE, TCE and by-products; Cd, Pb, U, Zn (S. viminalix); Potassium ferrocyanide (S. babylonica L.)	Phytoextraction. Perchlorate (wetland halophytes)	
Ag		Amanita strobiliformis	European Pine Cone Lepidella	Ag(H)	Macrofungi, Basidiomycete. Known from Europe, prefers calcareous areas	
Ag	10-1200	Brassica juncea	Indian Mustard	Ag(H)	Can form alloys of silver-gold-copper	
As	100	Agrostis capillaris L.	Common Bent Grass, Browntop. (= A. tenuris)	Al(A), Mn(A), Pb(A), Zn(A)		
As	H-	Agrostis castellana	Highland Bent Grass	Al(A), Mn(A), Pb(A), Zn(A)	Origin Portugal.	
As	1000	Agrostis tenerrima Trin.	Colonial bentgrass		4 records of plants	
As	2-1300	Cyanoboletus pulverulentus	Ink Stain Bolete	contains dimethylarsinic acid	Europe	
As	27,000 (fronds)	Pteris vittata L.	Ladder brake fern or Chinese brake fern	26% of As in the soil removed after 20 weeks' plantation, about 90% As accumulated in fronds.	Root extracts reduce arsenate to arsenite.	
As	100-7000	Sarcosphaera coronaria	pink crown, violet crown-cup, or violet star cup	As(H)	Ectomycorrhizal ascomycete, known from Europe	
Be					No reports found for accumulation	
Cr		Azolla spp.	mosquito fern, duckweed fern, fairy moss, water fern			
Cr	H-	Bacopa monnieri	Smooth Water Hyssop, Water hyssop, Brahmi, Thyme-leafed gratiola	Cd(H), Cu(H), Hg(A), Pb(A)	Origin India. Aquatic emergent species.	
Cr		Brassica juncea L.	Indian mustard	Cd(A), Cr(A), Cu(H), Ni(H), Pb(H), Pb(P), U(A), Zn(H)	Cultivated in agriculture.	
Cr		Brassica napus	Rapeseed plant	Ag, Hg, Pb, Se, Zn	Phytoextraction	
Cr	A-	Vallisneria americana	Tape Grass	Cd(H), Pb(H)	Native to Europe and North Africa. Widely cultivated in the aquarium trade.	
Cr	1000	Dicoma niccolifera			35 records of plants	
Cr	roots naturally absorb pollutants, some organic compounds believed to be carcinogenic, in concentrations 10,000 times that in the surrounding water.	Eichhornia crassipes	Water Hyacinth	Cd(H), Cu(A), Hg(H), Pb(H), Zn(A). Also Cs, Sr, U, and pesticides.	Pantropical/Subtropical. Plants sprayed with 2,4-D may accumulate lethal doses of nitrates. 'The troublesome weed' – hence an excellent source of bioenergy.	
Cr		Helianthus annuus	Sunflower		Phytoextraction and rhizofiltration	
Cr	A-	Hydrilla verticillata	Hydrilla	Cd(H), Hg(H), Pb(H)		
Cr		Medicago sativa	Alfalfa			
Cr		Pistia stratiotes	Water lettuce	Cd(T), Hg(H), Cr(H), Cu(T)		
Cr		Salix spp.	Osier spp.	Ag, Hg, Se, petroleum hydrocarbures, organic solvents, MTBE, TCE and by-products; Cd, Pb, U, Zn (S. viminalix); Potassium ferrocyanide (S. babylonica L.)	Phytoextraction. Perchlorate (wetland halophytes)	
Cr		Salvinia molesta	Kariba weeds or water ferns	Cr(H), Ni(H), Pb(H), Zn(A)		
Cr		Spirodela polyrhiza	Giant Duckweed	Cd(H), Ni(H), Pb(H), Zn(A)	Native to North America.	
Cr	100	Jamesbrittenia fodina Hilliard; Sutera fodina Wild				
Cr	A-	Thlaspi caerulescens	Alpine Pennycress, Alpine Pennygrass	Cd(H), Co(H), Cu(H), Mo, Ni(H), Pb(H), Zn(H)	Phytoextraction. T. caerulescens may acidify its rhizosphere, which would affect metal uptake by increasing available metals	
Cu	9000	Aeollanthus biformifolius				
Cu		Athyrium yokoscense	(Japanese false spleenwort?)	Cd(A), Pb(H), Zn(H)	Origin Japan.	
Cu	A-	Azolla filiculoides	Pacific mosquitofern	Ni(A), Pb(A), Mn(A)	Origin Africa. Floating plant.	
Cu	H-	Bacopa monnieri	Smooth Water Hyssop, Water hyssop, Brahmi, Thyme-leafed gratiola	Cd(H), Cr(H), Hg(A), Pb(A)	Origin India. Aquatic emergent species.	
Cu		Brassica juncea L.	Indian mustard	Cd(A), Cr(A), Cu(H), Ni(H), Pb(H), Pb(P), U(A), Zn(H)	cultivated	
Cu	H-	Vallisneria americana	Tape Grass	Cd(H), Cr(A), Pb(H)	Native to Europe and North Africa. Widely cultivated in the aquarium trade.	
Cu		Eichhornia crassipes	Water Hyacinth	Cd(H), Cr(A), Hg(H), Pb(H), Zn(A), Also Cs, Sr, U, and pesticides.	Pantropical/Subtropical, 'the troublesome weed'.	
Cu	1000	Haumaniastrum robertii (Lamiaceae)	Copper flower		27 records of plants. Origin Africa. This species' phanerogam has the highest cobalt content. Its distribution could be governed by cobalt rather than copper.	
Cu		Helianthus annuus	Sunflower		Phytoextraction with rhizofiltration	
Cu	1000	Larrea tridentata	Creosote Bush		67 records of plants. Origin U.S.	
Cu	H-	Lemna minor	Duckweed	Pb(H), Cd(H), Zn(A)	Native to North America and widespread worldwide.	
Cu		Ocimum centraliafricanum	Copper plant	Cu(T), Ni(T)	Origin Southern Africa	
Cu	T-	Pistia stratiotes	Water Lettuce	Cd(T), Hg(H), Cr(H)	Pantropical. Origin South U.S.A. Aquatic herb.	
Cu		Thlaspi caerulescens	Alpine pennycress, Alpine Pennycress, Alpine Pennygrass	Cd(H), Cr(A), Co(H), Mo, Ni(H), Pb(H), Zn(H)	Phytoextraction. Cu noticeably limits its growth.	
Mn	A-	Agrostis castellana	Highland Bent Grass	Al(A), As(A), Pb(A), Zn(A)	Origin Portugal.	
Mn		Azolla filiculoides	Pacific mosquitofern	Cu(A), Ni(A), Pb(A)	Origin Africa. Floating plant.	
Mn		Brassica juncea L.	Indian mustard			
Mn	23,000 (maximum) 11,000 (average) leaf	Chengiopanax sciadophylloides (Franch. & Sav.) C.B.Shang & J.Y.Huang	koshiabura		Origin Japan. Forest tree.	
Mn		Helianthus annuus	Sunflower		Phytoextraction and rhizofiltration	
Mn	1000	Macadamia neurophylla (now Virotia neurophylla (Guillaumin) P. H. Weston & A. R. Mast)			28 records of plants	
Mn	200					
Hg	A-	Bacopa monnieri	Smooth Water Hyssop, Water hyssop, Brahmi, Thyme-leafed gratiola	Cd(H), Cr(H), Cu(H), Hg(A), Pb(A)	Origin India. Aquatic emergent species.	
Hg		Brassica napus	Rapeseed plant	Ag, Cr, Pb, Se, Zn	Phytoextraction	
Hg		Eichhornia crassipes	Water Hyacinth	Cd(H), Cr(A), Cu(A), Pb(H), Zn(A). Also Cs, Sr, U, and pesticides.	Pantropical/Subtropical, 'the troublesome weed'.	
Hg	H-	Hydrilla verticillata	Hydrilla	Cd(H), Cr(A), Pb(H)		
Hg	1000	Pistia stratiotes	Water lettuce	Cd(T), Cr(H), Cu(T)	35 records of plants	
Hg		Salix spp.	Osier spp.	Ag, Cr, Se, petroleum hydrocarbures, organic solvents, MTBE, TCE and by-products; Cd, Pb, U, Zn (S. viminalix); Potassium ferrocyanide (S. babylonica L.)	Phytoextraction. Perchlorate (wetland halophytes)	
Mo	1500	Thlaspi caerulescens (Brassicaceae)	Alpine pennycress	Cd(H), Cr(A), Co(H), Cu(H), Ni(H), Pb(H), Zn(H)	phytoextraction	
Naphthalene		Festuca arundinacea	Tall Fescue		Increases catabolic genes and the mineralization of naphthalene.	
Naphthalene		Trifolium hirtum	Pink clover, rose clover		Decreases catabolic genes and the mineralization of naphthalene.	
Pb	A-	Agrostis castellana	'Highland Bent Grass	Al(A), As(H), Mn(A), Zn(A)	Origin Portugal.	
Pb		Ambrosia artemisiifolia	Ragweed			
Pb		Armeria maritima	Seapink Thrift			
Pb		Athyrium yokoscense	(Japanese false spleenwort?)	Cd(A), Cu(H), Zn(H)	Origin Japan.	
Pb	A-	Azolla filiculoides	Pacific mosquitofern	Cu(A), Ni(A), Mn(A)	Origin Africa. Floating plant.	
Pb	A-	Bacopa monnieri	Smooth Water Hyssop, Water hyssop, Brahmi, Thyme-leafed gratiola	Cd(H), Cr(H), Cu(H), Hg(A)	Origin India. Aquatic emergent species.	
Pb	H-	Brassica juncea	Indian mustard	Cd(A), Cr(A), Cu(H), Ni(H), Pb(H), Pb(P), U(A), Zn(H)	79 recorded plants. Phytoextraction	
Pb		Brassica napus	Rapeseed plant	Ag, Cr, Hg, Se, Zn	Phytoextraction	
Pb		Brassica oleracea	Ornamental Kale and Cabbage, Broccoli			
Pb	H-	Vallisneria americana	Tape Grass	Cd(H), Cr(A), Cu(H)	Native to Europe and North Africa. Widely cultivated in the aquarium trade.	
Pb		Eichhornia crassipes	Water Hyacinth	Cd(H), Cr(A), Cu(A), Hg(H), Zn(A). Also Cs, Sr, U, and pesticides.	Pantropical/Subtropical, 'the troublesome weed'.	
Pb		Festuca ovina	Blue Sheep Fescue			
Pb		Ipomoea trifida	Morning glory		Phytoextraction and rhizofiltration	
Pb	H-	Hydrilla verticillata	Hydrilla	Cd(H), Cr(A), Hg(H)		
Pb	H-	Lemna minor	Duckweed	Cd(H), Cu(H), Zn(H)	Native to North America and widespread worldwide.	
Pb		Salix viminalis	Common Osier	Cd, U, Zn, Ag, Cr, Hg, Se, petroleum hydrocarbures, organic solvents, MTBE, TCE and by-products (S. spp.); Potassium ferrocyanide (S. babylonica L.)	Phytoextraction. Perchlorate (wetland halophytes)	
Pb	H-	Salvinia molesta	Kariba weeds or water ferns	Cr(H), Ni(H), Pb(H), Zn(A)	Origin India.	
Pb		Spirodela polyrhiza	Giant Duckweed	Cd(H), Cr(H), Ni(H), Zn(A)	Native to North America.	
Pb		Thlaspi caerulescens (Brassicaceae)	Alpine pennycress, Alpine pennygrass	Cd(H), Cr(A), Co(H), Cu(H), Mo(H), Ni(H), Zn(H)	Phytoextraction.	
Pb		Thlaspi rotundifolium	Round-leaved Pennycress			
Pb		Triticum aestivum	Common Wheat			
Se	.012-20	Amanita muscaria	Fly agaric		Cap contains higher concentrations than stalks	
Se		Brassica juncea	Indian mustard		Rhizosphere bacteria enhance accumulation.	
Se		Brassica napus	Rapeseed plant	Ag, Cr, Hg, Pb, Zn	Phytoextraction.	
Se	Low rates of selenium volatilization from selenate-supplied Muskgrass (10-fold less than from selenite) may be due to a major rate limitation in the reduction of selenate to organic forms of selenium in Muskgrass.	Chara canescens Desv. & Lois	Muskgrass		Muskgrass treated with selenite contains 91% of the total Se in organic forms (selenoethers and diselenides), compared with 47% in Muskgrass treated with selenate. 1.9% of the total Se input is accumulated in its tissues; 0.5% is removed via biological volatilization.	
Se		Bassia scoparia (a.k.a. Kochia scoparia)	burningbush, ragweed, summer cypress, fireball, belvedere and Mexican firebrush, Mexican fireweed	U, Cr, Pb, Hg, Ag, Zn	Perchlorate (wetland halophytes). Phytoextraction.	
Se		Salix spp.	Osier spp.	Ag, Cr, Hg, petroleum hydrocarbures, organic solvents, MTBE, TCE and by-products; Cd, Pb, U, Zn (S. viminalis); Potassium ferrocyanide (S. babylonica L.)	Phytoextraction. Perchlorate (wetland halophytes).	
Zn	32,000	Arabidopsis halleri		Cd(H), Zn(H)	Occurring mainly in the Galmei (zinc) floras of central and western Europe	
Zn	A-	Agrostis castellana	Highland Bent Grass	Al(A), As(H), Mn(A), Pb(A)	Origin Portugal.	
Zn		Athyrium yokoscense	(Japanese false spleenwort?)	Cd(A), Cu(H), Pb(H)	Origin Japan.	
Zn		Brassicaceae	Mustards, mustard flowers, crucifers or cabbage family	Cd(H), Cs(H), Ni(H), Sr(H)	Phytoextraction	
Zn		Brassica juncea L.	Indian mustard	Cd(A), Cr(A), Cu(H), Ni(H), Pb(H), Pb(P), U(A).	Larvae of Pieris brassicae do not even sample its high-Zn leaves. (Pollard and Baker, 1997)	
Zn		Brassica napus	Rapeseed plant	Ag, Cr, Hg, Pb, Se	Phytoextraction	
Zn		Helianthus annuus	Sunflower		Phytoextraction and rhizofiltration	
Zn		Eichhornia crassipes	Water Hyacinth	Cd(H), Cr(A), Cu(A), Hg(H), Pb(H). Also Cs, Sr, U, and pesticides.	Pantropical/Subtropical, 'the troublesome weed'.	
Zn		Salix viminalis	Common Osier	Ag, Cr, Hg, Se, petroleum hydrocarbons, organic solvents, MTBE, TCE and by-products; Cd, Pb, U (S. viminalis); Potassium ferrocyanide (S. babylonica L.)	Phytoextraction. Perchlorate (wetland halophytes).	
Zn	A-	Salvinia molesta	Kariba weeds or water ferns	Cr(H), Ni(H), Pb(H), Zn(A)	Origin India.	
Zn	Cd: 574 to 1470 Zn: 9020 to 14,600	Sedum plumbizincicola (Crassulaceae)	Crassula or Stonecrop family	Cd(H), Zn(H)	Native to the Zitong Town in West Zhejiang Province, China	
Zn	1400	Silene vulgaris (Moench) Garcke (Caryophyllaceae)	Bladder campion			Ernst et al. (1990)
Zn		Spirodela polyrhiza	Giant Duckweed	Cd(H), Cr(H), Ni(H), Pb(H)	Native to North America.	
Zn	H-10,000	Thlaspi caerulescens (Brassicaceae)	Alpine pennycress	Cd(H), Cr(A), Co(H), Cu(H), Mo, Ni(H), Pb(H)	48 records of plants. May acidify its own rhizosphere, which would facilitate absorption by solubilization of the metal	
Zn		Trifolium pratense	Red Clover	Nonmetal accumulator.	Its rhizosphere is denser in bacteria than that of Thlaspi caerulescens, but T. caerulescens has relatively more metal-resistant bacteria.	

Cs-137 activity was much smaller in leaves of larch and sycamore maple than of spruce: spruce > larch > sycamore maple.
