= Hyperaccumulators table – 3 =

This list covers hyperaccumulators, plant species which accumulate, or are tolerant of, radionuclides (Cd, Cs-137, Co, Pu-238, Ra, Sr, U-234, 235, 238), hydrocarbons and organic solvents (Benzene, BTEX, DDT, Dieldrin, Endosulfan, Fluoranthene, MTBE, PCB, PCNB, TCE and by-products), and inorganic compounds (Potassium ferrocyanide).

See also:

- Hyperaccumulators table – 1 : Ag, Al, As, Be, Cr, Cu, Hg, Mn, Mo, Naphthalene, Pb, Pd, Se, Zn
- Hyperaccumulators table – 2 : Nickel

hyperaccumulators and contaminants: Radionuclides, Hydrocarbons and Organic Solvents – accumulation rates
Contaminant	Accumulation rates (in mg/kg of dry weight)	Latin name	English name	H-Hyperaccumulator or A-Accumulator P-Precipitator T-Tolerant	Notes	Sources
Cd		Athyrium yokoscense	(Japanese false spleenwort?)	Cd(A), Cu(H), Pb(H), Zn(H)	Origin Japan	
Cd	>100	Avena strigosa Schreb.	New-Oat; Lopsided Oat or Bristle Oat			
Cd	H-	Bacopa monnieri	Smooth Water Hyssop, Waterhyssop, Brahmi, Thyme-leafed gratiola, Water hyssop	Cr(H), Cu(H), Hg(A), Pb(A)	Origin India; aquatic emergent species	
Cd		Brassicaceae	Mustards, mustard flowers, crucifers or, cabbage family	Cd(H), Cs(H), Ni(H), Sr(H), Zn(H)	Phytoextraction	
Cd	A-	Brassica juncea L.	Indian mustard	Cr(A), Cu(H), Ni(H), Pb(H), Pb(P), U(A), Zn(H)	cultivated	
Cd	H-	Vallisneria americana	Tape Grass	Cr(A), Cu(H), Pb(H)	Origins Europe and N. Africa; extensively cultivated in the aquarium trade	
Cd	>100	Crotalaria juncea	Sunn or sunn hemp		High amounts of total soluble phenolics	
Cd	H-	Eichhornia crassipes	Water Hyacinth	Cr(A), Cu(A), Hg(H), Pb(H), Zn(A). Also Cs Sr, U and pesticides	Pantropical/Subtropical, 'the troublesome weed'	
Cd		Helianthus annuus	Sunflower		Phytoextraction & rhizofiltration	
Cd	H-	Hydrilla verticillata	Hydrilla	Cr(A), Hg(H), Pb(H)		
Cd	H-	Lemna minor	Duckweed	Pb(H), Cu(H), Zn(A)	Native to North America and widespread	
Cd	T-	Pistia stratiotes	Water lettuce	Cu(T), Hg(H), Cr(H)	Pantropical, Origin South U.S.A.; aquatic herb	
Cd		Salix viminalis L.	Common Osier, Basket Willow	Ag, Cr, Hg, Se, petroleum hydrocarbons, organic solvents, MTBE, TCE and by-products; Pb, U, Zn (S. viminalix); Potassium ferrocyanide (S. babylonica L.)	Phytoextraction. Perchlorate (wetland halophytes)	
Cd		Spirodela polyrhiza	Giant Duckweed	Cr(H), Pb(H), Ni(H), Zn(A)	Native to North America	
Cd	>100	Tagetes erecta L.	African-tall		Tolerance only. Lipid peroxidation level increases; activities of antioxidative enzymes such as superoxide dismutase, ascorbate peroxidase, glutathione reductase, and catalase are depressed.	
Cd		Thlaspi caerulescens	Alpine pennycress	Cr(A), Co(H), Cu(H), Mo, Ni(H), Pb(H), Zn(H)	Phytoextraction. Its rhizosphere's bacterial population is less dense than with Trifolium pratense but richer in specific metal-resistant bacteria.	
Cd	1000	Vallisneria spiralis	Eel grass		37 records of plants; origin India	
Cs-137		Acer rubrum, Acer pseudoplatanus	Red maple, Sycamore maple	Pu-238, Sr-90	Leaves: much less uptake in Larch and Sycamore maple than in Spruce.	
Cs-137		Agrostis spp.	Agrostis spp.		Grass or Forb species capable of accumulating radionuclides	
Cs-137	up to 3000 Bq kg-1	Amaranthus retroflexus ( cv. Belozernii, aureus, Pt-95)	Redroot Amaranth	Cd(H), Cs(H), Ni(H), Sr(H), Zn(H)	Phytoextraction. Can accumulate radionuclides, ammonium nitrate and ammonium chloride as chelating agents. Maximum concentration is reached after 35 days of growth.	
Cs-137		Brassicaceae	Mustards, mustard flowers, crucifers or, cabbage family	Cd(H), Cs(H), Ni(H), Sr(H), Zn(H)	Phytoextraction. Ammonium nitrate and ammonium chloride as chelating agents.	
Cs-137		Brassica juncea	Indian mustard		Contains 2 to 3 times more Cs-137 in his roots than in the biomass above ground Ammonium nitrate and ammonium chloride as chelating agents.	
Cs-137		Cerastium fontanum	Big Chickweed		Grass or Forb species capable of accumulating radionuclides	
Cs-137		Beta vulgaris, Chenopodiaceae, Kail? and/or Salsola?	Beet, Quinoa, Russian thistle	Sr-90, Cs-137	Grass or Forb species capable of accumulating radionuclides	
Cs-137		Cocos nucifera	Coconut palm		Tree able to accumulate radionuclides	
Cs-137		Eichhornia crassipes	Water hyacinth	U Sr (high % uptake within a few days). Also Cd(H), Cr(A), Cu(A), Hg(H), Pb, Zn(A) and pesticides.		
Cs-137		Eragrostis bahiensis (Eragrostis)	Bahia lovegrass		Glomus mosseae as amendment. It increases the surface area of the plant roots, allowing roots to acquire more nutrients, water and therefore more available radionuclides in soil solution.	
Cs-137		Eucalyptus tereticornis	Forest redgum	Sr-90	Tree able to accumulate radionuclides	
Cs-137		Festuca arundinacea	Tall fescue		Grass or Forb species capable of accumulating radionuclides	
Cs-137		Festuca rubra	Fescue		Grass or Forb species capable of accumulating radionuclides	
Cs-137		Glomus mosseae as chelating agent (Glomus (fungus))	Mycorrhizal fungi		Glomus mosseae as amendment. It increases the surface area of the plant roots, allowing roots to acquire more nutrients, water and therefore more available radionuclides in soil solution.	
Cs-137		Glomus intradices (Glomus (fungus))	Mycorrhizal fungi		Glomus mosseae as chelating agent. It increases the surface area of the plant roots, allowing roots to acquire more nutrients, water and therefore more available radionuclides in soil solution.	
Cs-137	4900-8600	Helianthus annuus	Sunflower	U Sr (high % uptake within a few days)	Accumulates up to 8 times more Cs-137 than timothy or foxtail. Contains 2 to 3 times more Cs-137 in its roots than in the biomass above ground.	
Cs-137		Larix	Larch		Leaves: much less uptake in Larch and Sycamore maple than in Spruce. 20% of the translocated caesium into new leaves resulted from root-uptake 2.5 years after the Chernobyl accident.	
Cs-137		Liquidambar styraciflua	American sweet gum	Pu-238, Sr-90	Tree able to accumulate radionuclides	
Cs-137		Liriodendron tulipifera	Tulip tree	Pu-238, Sr-90	Tree able to accumulate radionuclides	
Cs-137		Lolium multiflorum	Italian Ryegrass	Sr	Mycorrhizae: accumulates much more Cs-137 and Sr-90 when grown in Sphagnum peat than in any other medium incl. Clay, sand, silt and compost.	
Cs-137		Lolium perenne	Perennial ryegrass		Can accumulate radionuclides	
Cs-137		Panicum virgatum	Switchgrass			
Cs-137		Phaseolus acutifolius	Tepary Beans	Cd(H), Cs(H), Ni(H), Sr(H), Zn(H)	Phytoextraction. Ammonium nitrate and ammonium chloride as chelating agents	
Cs-137		Phalaris arundinacea L.	Reed canary grass	Cd(H), Cs(H), Ni(H), Sr(H), Zn(H) Ammonium nitrate and ammonium chloride as chelating agents.	Phytoextraction	
Cs-137		Picea abies	Spruce		Conc. about 25-times higher in bark compared to wood, 1.5–4.7 times higher in directly contaminated twig-axes than in leaves.	
Cs-137		Pinus radiata, Pinus ponderosa	Monterey pine, Ponderosa pine	Sr-90. Also petroleum hydrocarbons, organic solvents, MTBE, TCE and by-products (Pinus spp.	Phytocontainment. Tree able to accumulate radionuclides.	
Cs-137		Sorghum halepense	Johnson Grass			
Cs-137		Trifolium repens	White Clover		Grass or Forb species capable of accumulating radionuclides	
Cs-137	H	Zea mays	Corn		High absorption rate. Accumulates radionuclides. Contains 2 to 3 times more Cs137 in his roots than in the biomass above ground.	
Co	1000 to 4304	Haumaniastrum robertii (Lamiaceae)	Copper flower		27 records of plants; origin Africa. Vernacular name: 'copper flower'. This species' phanerogamme has the highest cobalt content. Its distribution could be governed by cobalt rather than copper.	
Co	H-	Thlaspi caerulescens	Alpine pennycress	Cd(H), Cr(A), Cu(H), Mo, Ni(H), Pb(H), Zn(H)	Phytoextraction	
Pu-238		Acer rubrum	Red maple	Cs-137, Sr-90	Tree able to accumulate radionuclides	
Pu-238		Liquidambar styraciflua	American sweet gum	Cs-137, Sr-90	Tree able to accumulate radionuclides	
Pu-238		Liriodendron tulipifera	Tulip tree	Cs-137, Sr-90	Tree able to accumulate radionuclides	
Ra					No reports found for accumulation	
Sr		Acer rubrum	Red maple	Cs-137, Pu-238	Tree able to accumulate radionuclides	
Sr		Brassicaceae	Mustards, mustard flowers, crucifers or, cabbage family	Cd(H), Cs(H), Ni(H), Zn(H)	Phytoextraction	
Sr		Beta vulgaris, Chenopodiaceae, Kail? and/or Salsola?	Beet, Quinoa, Russian thistle	Sr-90, Cs-137	Can accumulate radionuclides	
Sr		Eichhornia crassipes	Water Hyacinth	Cs-137, U-234, 235, 238. Also Cd(H), Cr(A), Cu(A), Hg(H), Pb, Zn(A) and pesticides.	In pH of 9, accumulates high concentrations of Sr-90 with approx. 80 to 90% of it in its roots	
Sr		Eucalyptus tereticornis	Forest redgum	Cs-137	Tree able to accumulate radionuclides	
Sr	H-?	Helianthus annuus	Sunflower		Accumulates radionuclides; high absorption rate. Phytoextraction & rhizofiltration	
Sr		Liquidambar styraciflua	American sweet gum	Cs-137, Pu-238	Tree able to accumulate radionuclides	
Sr		Liriodendron tulipifera	Tulip tree	Cs-137, Pu-238	Tree able to accumulate radionuclides	
Sr		Lolium multiflorum	Italian Ryegrass	Cs	Mycorrhizae: accumulates much more Cs-137 and Sr-90 when grown in Sphagnum peat than in any other medium incl. clay, sand, silt and compost.	
Sr	1.5-4.5 % in their shoots	Pinus radiata, Pinus ponderosa	Monterey pine, Ponderosa pine	Petroleum hydrocarbons, organic solvents, MTBE, TCE and by-products; Cs-137	Phytocontainment. Accumulate 1.5-4.5 % of Sr-90 in their shoots.	
Sr		Apiaceae (a.k.a. Umbelliferae)	Carrot or parsley family		Species most capable of accumulating radionuclides	
Sr		Fabaceae (a.k.a. Leguminosae)	Legume, pea, or bean family		Species most capable of accumulating radionuclides	
U		Amaranthus	Amaranth	Cd(A), Cr(A), Cu(H), Ni(H), Pb(H), Pb(P), Zn(H)	Citric acid chelating agent and see note. Cs: maximum concentration is reached after 35 days of growth.	
U		Brassica juncea, Brassica chinensis, Brassica narinosa	Cabbage family	Cd(A), Cr(A), Cu(H), Ni(H), Pb(H), Pb(P), Zn(H)	Citric acid chelating agent increases uptake 1000 times, and see note	
U-234, 235, 238		Eichhornia crassipes	Water Hyacinth	Cs-137, Sr-90. Also Cd(H), Cr(A), Cu(A), Hg(H), Pb, Zn(A), and pesticides.		
U-234, 235, 238	95% of U in 24 hours.	Helianthus annuus	Sunflower		Accumulates radionuclides; At a contaminated wastewater site in Ashtabula, Ohio, 4 wk-old splants can remove more than 95% of uranium in 24 hours. Phytoextraction & rhizofiltration.	URL
U		Juniperus	Juniper		Accumulates (radionuclides) U in his roots	
U		Picea mariana	Black Spruce		Accumulates (radionuclides) U in his twigs	
U		Quercus	Oak		Accumulates (radionuclides) U in his roots	
U		Kail? and/or Salsola?	Russian thistle (tumble weed)			
U		Salix viminalis	Common Osier	Ag, Cr, Hg, Se, petroleum hydrocarbons, organic solvents, MTBE, TCE and by-products; Cd, Pb, Zn (S. viminalis); potassium ferrocyanide (S. babylonica L.)	Phytoextraction. Perchlorate (wetland halophytes)	
U		Silene vulgaris (a.k.a. Silene cucubalus)	Bladder campion			
U		Zea mays	Maize			
U	A-?					
Radionuclides		Tradescantia bracteata	Spiderwort		Indicator for radionuclides: the stamens (normally blue or blue-purple) become pink when exposed to radionuclides	
Benzene		Chlorophytum comosum	spider plant			
Benzene		Ficus elastica	rubber fig, rubber bush, rubber tree, rubber plant, or Indian rubber bush			
Benzene		Kalanchoe blossfeldiana	Kalanchoe		seems to take benzene selectively over toluene.	
Benzene		Pelargonium x domesticum	Germanium			
BTEX		Phanerochaete chrysosporium	White rot fungus	DDT, Dieldrin, Endodulfan, Pentachloronitro-benzene, PCP	Phytostimulation	
DDT		Phanerochaete chrysosporium	White rot fungus	BTEX, Dieldrin, Endodulfan, Pentachloronitro-benzene, PCP	Phytostimulation	
Dieldrin		Phanerochaete chrysosporium	White rot fungus	DDT, BTEX, Endodulfan, Pentachloronitro-benzene, PCP	Phytostimulation	
Endosulfan		Phanerochaete chrysosporium	White rot fungus	DDT, BTEX, Dieldrin, PCP, Pentachloronitro-benzène	Phytostimulation	
Fluoranthene		Cyclotella caspia Cyclotella caspia			Approximate rate of biodegradation on 1st day: 35%; on 6th day: 85% (rate of physical degradation 5.86% only).	
Hydrocarbons		Cynodon dactylon (L.) Pers.	Bermuda grass		Mean petroleum hydrocarbons reduction of 68% after 1 year	
Hydrocarbons		Festuca arundinacea	Tall fescue		Mean petroleum hydrocarbons reduction of 62% after 1 year	
Hydrocarbons		Pinus spp.	Pine spp.	Organic solvents, MTBE, TCE and by-products. Also Cs-137, Sr-90	Phytocontainment. Tree able to accumulate radionuclides (P. ponderosa, P. radiata)	
Hydrocarbons		Salix spp.	Osier spp.	Ag, Cr, Hg, Se, organic solvents, MTBE, TCE and by-products; Cd, Pb, U, Zn (S. viminalis); Potassium ferrocyanide (S. babylonica L.)	Phytoextraction. Perchlorate (wetland halophytes)	
MTBE		Pinus spp.	Pine spp.	Petroleum hydrocarbons, Organic solvents, TCE and by-products. Also Cs-137, Sr-90 (Pinus radiata, Pinus ponderosa)	Phytocontainment. Tree able to accumulate radionuclides (P. ponderosa, P. radiata)	
MTBE		Salix spp.	Osier spp.	Ag, Cr, Hg, Se, petroleum hydrocarbons, organic solvents, TCE and by-products; Cd, Pb, U, Zn (S. viminalis); Potassium ferrocyanide (S. babylonica L.)	Phytoextraction, phytocontainment. Perchlorate (wetland halophytes)	
Organic solvents		Pinus spp.	Pine spp.	Petroleum hydrocarbons, MTBE, TCE and by-products. Also Cs-137, Sr-90 (Pinus radiata, Pinus ponderosa)	Phytocontainment. Tree able to accumulate radionuclides (P. ponderosa, P. radiata)	
Organic solvents		Salix spp.	Osier spp.	Ag, Cr, Hg, Se, petroleum hydrocarbons, MTBE, TCE and by-products; Cd, Pb, U, Zn (S. viminalis); Potassium ferrocyanide (S. babylonica L.)	Phytoextraction. phytocontainment . Perchlorate (wetland halophytes)	
Organic solvents		Pinus spp.	Pine spp.	Petroleum hydrocarbons, MTBE, TCE and by-products. Also Cs-137, Sr-90 (Pinus radiata, Pinus ponderosa)	Phytocontainment. Tree able to accumulate radionuclides (P. ponderosa, P. radiata)	
Organic solvents		Salix spp.	Osier spp.	Ag, Cr, Hg, Se, petroleum hydrocarbons, MTBE, TCE and by-products; Cd, Pb, U, Zn (S. viminalis); Potassium ferrocyanide (S. babylonica L.)	Phytoextraction. phytocontainment . Perchlorate (wetland halophytes)	
PCNB		Phanerochaete chrysosporium	White rot fungus	DDT, BTEX, Dieldrin, Endodulfan, PCP	Phytostimulation	
Potassium ferrocyanide	8.64% to 15.67% of initial mass	Salix babylonica L.	Weeping Willow	Ag, Cr, Hg, Se, petroleum hydrocarbons, organic solvents, MTBE, TCE and by-products (Salix spp.); Cd, Pb, U, Zn (S. viminalis); Potassium ferrocyanide (S. babylonica L.)	Phytoextraction. Perchlorate (wetland halophytes). No ferrocyanide in air from plant transpiration. A large fraction of initial mass was metabolized during transport within the plant.	
Potassium ferrocyanide	8.64% to 15.67% of initial mass	Salix matsudana Koidz, Salix matsudana Koidz x Salix alba L.	Hankow Willow, Hybrid Willow	Ag, Cr, Hg, Se, petroleum hydrocarbons, organic solvents, MTBE, TCE and by-products (Salix spp.); Cd, Pb, U, Zn (S. viminalis).	No ferrocyanide in air from plant transpiration.	
PCB		Rosa spp.	Paul's Scarlet Rose		Phytodegradation	
PCP		Phanerochaete chrysosporium	White rot fungus	DDT, BTEX, Dieldrin, Endodulfan, Pentachloronitro-benzène	Phytostimulation	
TCE		Chlorophytum comosum	spider plant		Seems to lower the removal rates of benzene and methane.	
TCE and by-products		Pinus spp.	Pine spp.	Petroleum hydrocarbons, organic solvents, MTBE. Also Cs-137, Sr-90 (Pinus radiata, Pinus ponderosa)	Phytocontainment. Tree able to accumulate radionuclides (P. ponderosa, P. radiata)	
TCE and by-products		Salix spp.	Osier spp.	Ag, Cr, Hg, Se, petroleum hydrocarbons, organic solvents, MTBE; Cd, Pb, U, Zn (S. viminalis); Potassium ferrocyanide (S. babylonica L.)	Phytoextraction, phytocontainment. Perchlorate (wetland halophytes)	
		Musa (genus)	Banana tree		Extra-dense root system, good for rhizofiltration.	
		Cyperus papyrus	Papyrus		Extra-dense root system, good for rhizofiltration	
			Taros		Extra-dense root system, good for rhizofiltration	
		Brugmansia spp.	Angel's trumpet		Semi-anaerobic, good for rhizofiltration	
		Caladium	Caladium		Semi-anaerobic and resistant, good for rhizofiltration	
		Caltha palustris	Marsh marigold		Semi-anaerobic and resistant, good for rhizofiltration	
		Iris pseudacorus	Yellow Flag, paleyellow iris		Semi-anaerobic and resistant, good for rhizofiltration	
		Mentha aquatica	Water Mint		Semi-anaerobic and resistant, good for rhizofiltration	
		Scirpus lacustris	Bulrush		Semi-anaerobic and resistant, good for rhizofiltration	
		Typha latifolia	Broadleaf cattail		Semi-anaerobic and resistant, good for rhizofiltration	

== Notes ==
- Uranium: The symbol for Uranium is sometimes given as Ur instead of U. According to Ulrich Schmidt and others, plants' concentration of uranium is considerably increased by an application of citric acid, which solubilizes the uranium (and other metals).
- Radionuclides: Cs-137 and Sr-90 are not removed from the top 0.4 meters of soil even under high rainfall, and migration rate from the top few centimeters of soil is slow.
- Radionuclides: Plants with mycorrhizal associations are often more effective than non-mycorrhizal plants at the uptake of radionuclides.
- Radionuclides: In general, soils containing higher amounts of organic matter will allow plants to accumulate higher amounts of radionuclides. See also note on Lolium multiflorum in Paasikallio 1984. Plant uptake is also increased with a higher cation exchange capacity for Sr-90 availability, and a lower base saturation for uptake of both Sr-90 and Cs-137.
- Radionuclides: Fertilizing the soil with nitrogen if needed will indirectly increase the take-up of radionuclides by generally boosting the plant's overall growth and more specifically roots' growth. But some fertilizers such as K or Ca compete with the radionuclides for cation exchange sites, and will not increase the take-up of radionuclides.
- Radionuclides: Zhu and Smolders, lab test: Cs uptake is mostly influenced by K supply. The uptake of radiocaesium depends mainly on two transport pathways on plant root cell membranes: the K+ transporter and the K+ channel pathway. Cs is likely transported by the K+ transport system. When external concentration of K is limited to low levels, le K+ transporter shows little discrimination against Cs+; if K supply is high, the K+ channel is dominant and shows high discrimination against Cs+. Caesium is very mobile within the plant, but the ratio Cs/K is not uniform within the plant. Phytoremediation as a possible option for the decontamination of caesium-contaminated soils is limited mainly by that it takes tens of years and creates large volumes of waste.
- Alpine pennycress or Alpine Pennygrass is found as Alpine Pennycrest in (some books).
- The references are so far mostly from academic trial papers, experiments and generally of exploration of that field.
- Radionuclides: Broadley and Willey find that across 30 taxa studied, Gramineae and Chenopodiaceae show the strongest correlation between Rb (K) and Cs concentration. The fast-growing Chenopodiaceae discriminate approx. 9 times less between Rb and Cs than the slow-growingGramineae, and this correlate with highest and lowest concentrations achieved respectively.
- Caesium: In Chernobyl-derived radioactivity, the amount of contamination is dependent on the roughness of bark, absolute bark surface and the existence of leaves during the deposition. The major contamination of the shoots is from direct deposition on the trees.

== Links to the other sections ==
- Hyperaccumulators table – 1 : Al, Ag, As, Be, Cr, Cu, Mn, Hg, Mo, Naphthalene, Pb, Pd, Pt, Se, Zn
- Hyperaccumulators table – 2 : Nickel
