= St Xavier's School, Belgaum =

St. Xavier's School

Location
- B.C. 149; Camp; Belagavi, India, Karnataka 590001; India
- Coordinates: 15°51′45.3″N 74°30′14.6″E

Information
- School type: Private Unaided, Private Aided (Only Grades 8 - 10), Co-educational
- Motto: Let Your Light Shine
- Patron saint: St. Francis Xavier
- Established: 1966
- School board: Karnataka Secondary Education Examination Board
- Authority: The Diocese Of Belgaum
- School code: 29010305912, 29010305917
- Gender: Male, Female
- Classes: 14
- Classes offered: Kindergarten, Grades I to XI
- Language: English
- Campus type: Urban
- Houses: Gold, Blue, Red, Green
- Colours: Grey, Navy Blue
- Sports: Cricket, Football, Limbo Skating
- Affiliation: Karnataka Secondary Education Examination Board
- Alumni: Rohan Kokane (Guinness World Record holding Lowest Limbo Skater)

St Xavier's School, founded in 1940, is a co-educational school recognized by the Government of Karnataka, India, and administered by National University of Educational Planning and Administration which caters to students of all communities. This school is located at B.C. 149, Camp, Belagavi.

The school administration is divided into:

- Pre-Primary School (Kindergarten I and II)
- Primary School (Grades I to VII)
- Secondary School (Grades VIII to X)
- Pre- University College (Grades XI and XII)

The school participates in football, cricket and athletics. It also has its own School Band.

The school has a House system with students of each house being represented by the colors Gold, Blue, Green and Red. It also follows a Parliamentary System made up of and run by the students themselves.
