= Ivan Korshikov =

Ivan Ivanovych Korshikov
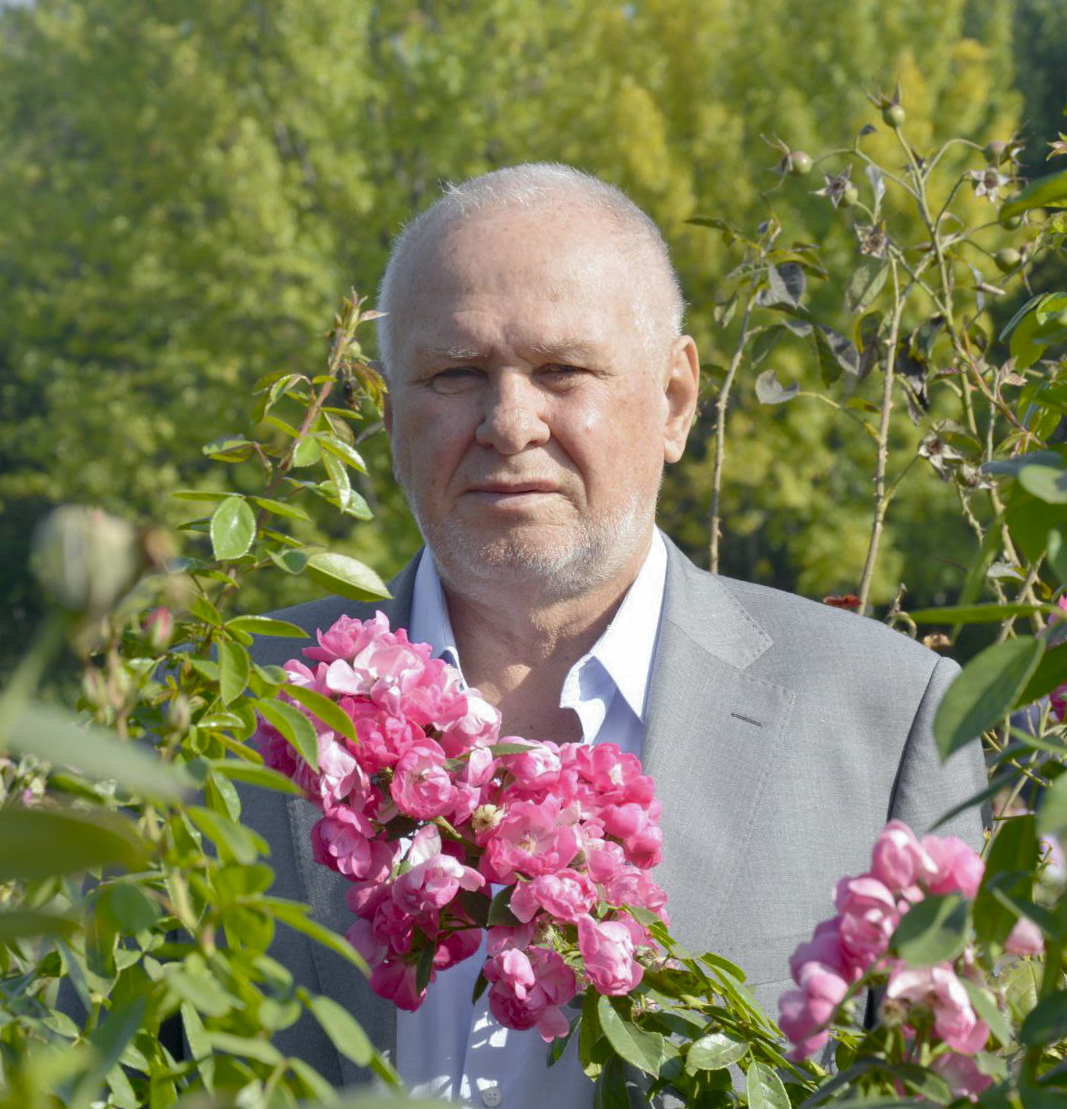
- Born: September 4, 1950; Prudenteve, Zaporizhzhia Oblast, Ukrainian SSR, USSR
- Died: February 2, 2024 (aged 73); Staryi Krym, Autonomous Republic of Crimea, Ukraine
- Education: M. I. Kalinin Crimean Agricultural Institute (now Crimean Agrotechnological University)
- Known for: industrial botany; population genetics of woody plants; phytoremediation of technogenically disturbed lands
- Awards: V. Ya. Yuriev Prize of the National Academy of Sciences of Ukraine (2008); NASU badges For Training the Scientific Reserve (2010) and For Scientific Achievements (2020)
- Scientific career
- Fields: Plant physiology; population genetics
- Workplaces: Donetsk Botanical Garden of the National Academy of Sciences of Ukraine; Kryvyi Rih Botanical Garden of the National Academy of Sciences of Ukraine

Ivan Ivanovych Korshikov (also spelled Korshykov; Ukrainian: Іван Іванович Коршиков; 4 September 1950 – 2 February 2024) was a Ukrainian plant physiologist and population geneticist, Doctor of Biological Sciences (1994) and Professor (2002).

== Early life and education ==
Korshikov entered the M. I. Kalinin Crimean Agricultural Institute in 1967 and graduated with distinction in 1972 with a degree in agronomy. His diploma thesis was completed at the Magarach All-Union Research Institute of Viticulture and Winemaking (Yalta). He subsequently worked for about 18 months at the experimental farm of the Ukrainian Research Institute of Irrigated Horticulture (Melitopol).

He defended his Candidate of Sciences (PhD) dissertation, Phytotoxicity of phenolic ingredients of environmental pollution, at Vilnius University in 1981, and his Doctor of Sciences dissertation, Adaptation of plants to technogenically polluted environments, at Taras Shevchenko National University of Kyiv in 1994. He was awarded the academic title of Professor on 18 April 2002.

== Career ==
Korshikov began his career in 1973 as an engineer at the Department of Plant Stress Physiology of the Donetsk Botanical Garden of the Academy of Sciences of the Ukrainian SSR. He became a junior researcher in 1979 and a senior researcher in 1982. In 1989 he headed the Laboratory of Ecological Plant Physiology, and from 2010 the Department of Population Genetics at the Donetsk Botanical Garden.

He served as Director of the Donetsk Botanical Garden from 1 July 2015 to 29 June 2017, and concurrently as Director of the Kryvyi Rih Botanical Garden from 1 March 2016 to 24 March 2022. He chaired the Academic Councils of both botanical gardens (from December 2015 in Donetsk and from September 2017 in Kryvyi Rih).

== Research ==
Korshikov was among the founders of the Ukrainian school of industrial botany, focused on plant responses to technogenic transformation of environments. His research covered plant tolerance and adaptation to industrial and vehicular emissions, bioindication, and Phytoremediation. He showed that aeropollutants damage leaves not only directly but also indirectly via activation of Lipid peroxidation.

He was a recognized specialist in population genetics of woody plants. His group was among the first in the former USSR to apply Isozyme Electrophoresis to plant genotype identification and later introduced DNA Microsatellite analysis for assessing genetic polymorphism of conifer and broadleaf tree populations in Ukraine. The work led to recommendations for forming local tree populations on mined and industrial lands (e.g., spoil tips of Kryvyi Rih) to restore vegetation cover.

In applied projects on the phytoreclamation of iron-ore spoil heaps in Kryvyi Rih, over 100 woody and shrubby species were tested. Species such as Lombardy poplar (Populus italica), white poplar (P. alba), silver birch (Betula pendula), mahaleb cherry (Padellus mahaleb), Crimean pine (Pinus pallasiana) and Scots pine (P. sylvestris) showed high survival and colonization potential for use in technogenic ecotopes. His group also developed approaches using vegetatively mobile species (e.g., Populus italica, P. alba, Hippophaë rhamnoides) capable of forming clumps up to 500 m² that stabilize spoil surfaces.

Over his career, he supervised 2 Doctors of Sciences and 19 Candidates of Sciences in molecular genetics, genetics, cytology and histology, plant physiology, botany, and ecology.

Korshikov authored about 500 scientific publications, including seven monographs and over 60 articles indexed in Scopus.

== Selected publications ==
Articles (English)

- Korshikov, I. I.; Belonozhko, Y.; Lapteva, H. (2019). "Cytogenetic abnormalities in seed progenies of Pinus pallasiana from technogenically polluted areas of the Ukrainian steppe". Ekológia (Bratislava) 38(2): 117–125. doi:10.2478/eko-2019-0009.
- Korshikov, I. I.; Bilonozhko, Y. O.; Hrabovyi, V. M. (2021). "Cytogenetic characteristics of seed progeny of old-aged trees of Pinus pallasiana and Picea abies". Ukrainian Botanical Journal 78(6): 434–441. doi:10.15407/ukrbotj78.06.434.
- Politov, D. V.; Pirko, Ya. V.; Pirko, N. N.; Mudrik, E. A.; Korshikov, I. I. (2008). "Analysis of mating system in two Pinus cembra L. populations of the Ukrainian Carpathians". Annals of Forest Research 51: 11–18. doi:10.15287/afr.2008.141.
- Korshikov, I. I.; Pirko, N. N.; Mudrik, E. A.; Pirko, Y. V. (2007). "Maintenance of genetic structure in progenies of marginal mountainous and steppe populations of Crimean pine (Pinaceae)". Silvae Genetica 56(1): 1–10. doi:10.1515/sg-2007-0001.

Monographs (selection)

- Phytotoxicity of organic and inorganic pollutants. Kyiv: Naukova Dumka, 1986. (in Russian).
- Korshikov, I. I.; Kotov, V. S. Interaction of plants with technogenically polluted environments: tolerance, bioindication, optimization. Kyiv: Naukova Dumka, 1995. (in Russian).
- Adaptation of plants to technogenically polluted environments. Kyiv: Naukova Dumka, 1996. 238 pp. (in Russian).
- Korshikov, I. I.; Terlyha, N. S.; Bychkov, S. A. Population-genetic issues of dendrotechnogenic introduction (on the example of Crimean pine). Donetsk: Lebid, 2002. ISBN 966-508-176-4. (in Russian).
- Population genetics and reproductive biology of Crimean pine. Donetsk: Knowlidge, 2010. 243 pp. (in Russian).
- Korshikov, I. I.; Krasnoshtan, O. V. Viability of woody plants on iron-ore dumps of Kryvbas. Donetsk/Kryvyi Rih: Donetsk and Kryvyi Rih Botanical Gardens of NASU, 2012. 280 pp. ISBN 978-966-02-6358-1. (in Russian).
- Korshikov, I. I.; Suslova, O. P.; Petrushkevych, Yu. M. (eds.). Woody plants in industrial cities of the Steppe zone. Odesa: Helvetica, 2020. 456 pp. ISBN 978-966-992-300-4. (in Ukrainian).

== Patents ==
- Utility model UA 42241. "Method of heat-stress stimulation of rooting in stem cuttings for accelerated propagation of ornamental woody shrubs." Registered 25 June 2009.
- Utility model UA 80588. "Method to promote natural regeneration of Pinus sylvestris on chalk dumps and soda-plant quarries of Donetsk region." Registered 10 June 2013.
- Utility model UA 81558. "Method for genetic marking and selection of trees with increased heterozygosity of seeds in natural populations of Stankevich’s pine." Registered 10 July 2013.

== Awards ==
- V. Ya. Yuriev Prize of the National Academy of Sciences of Ukraine (2008), for a series of works on plant acclimatization and selection in technogenically transformed environments (population-genetic and conservation bases).
- NASU badge For Training the Scientific Reserve (2010).
- NASU centennial commemorative distinction (2018).
- NASU badge For Scientific Achievements (2020).
- Honorary diplomas of the NASU Presidium, Donetsk Regional Council and Kryvyi Rih City Council.
- Gold and bronze medals of the USSR VDNKh.
