= Hyperaccumulators table – 2: Nickel =

This list covers known nickel hyperaccumulators, accumulators or plant species tolerant to nickel.

See also:

- Hyperaccumulators table – 1: Ag, Al, As, Be, Cr, Cu, Hg, Mn, Mo, Naphthalene, Pb, Pd, Se, Zn
- Hyperaccumulators table – 3: Cd, Cs, Co, Pu, Ra, Sr, U, radionuclides, hydrocarbons, organic solvents, etc.

hyperaccumulators and contaminants : Ni – accumulation rates
Contaminant	Accumulation rates (in mg/kg of dry weight)	Latin name	English name	H-Hyperaccumulator or A-Accumulator P-Precipitator T-Tolerant	Notes	Sources
Ni	9090	Alyssum akamasicum B.L. Burtt (Brassica)			Distrib. Cyprus	
Ni	4480	Alyssum alpestre L (Brassica)			Distrib. S. Europe	
Ni	8170	Alyssum anatolicum Nyar. (Brassica)			Distrib. Turkey	
Ni	29400	Alyssum argenteum All. (Brassica)			Distrib. Italy	
Ni	10200	Alyssum bertolonii subsp. Scutarinum Nyar. (Brassica)			Distrib. Balkans	
Ni	10900	Alyssum callicrum Boiss. and Balansa (Brassica)			Distrib. Turkey	
Ni	16500	Alyssum carcium T.R. Dudley & Huber-Morath (Brassica)			Distrib. Turkey	
Ni	20000	Alyssum cassium Boiss. (Brassica)			Distrib. Turkey	
Ni	16300	Alyssum chondrogynum B.L. Blurtt (Brassica)			Distrib. Cyprus	
Ni	13500	Alyssum cilicium Boiss. and Balansa (Brassica)			Distrib. Turkey	
Ni	4900	Alyssum condensatum Boiss. And Hausskn. (Brassica)			Distrib. Iraq, Syria	
Ni	18100	Alyssum constellatum Boiss. (Brassica)			Distrib. Turkey	
Ni	13500	Alyssum corsicum Duby (Brassica)			Distrib. Corsica	
Ni	10400	Alyssum crenulatum Boiss. (Brassica)			Distrib. Turkey	
Ni	23600	Alyssum cypricum Nyar. (Brassica)			Distrib. Cyprus	
Ni	19600	Alyssum davisianum T.R. Dudley (Brassica)			Distrib. Turkey	
Ni	11700	Alyssum discolor T.R. Dudley & Huber-Morah (Brassica)			Distrib. Turkey	
Ni	16500	Alyssum dubertretii gomb (Brassica)			Distrib. Turkey	
Ni	4550	Alyssum euboeum Halacsy (Brassica)			Distrib. Greece	
Ni	11500	Alyssum eriophyllum Boiss. and Hausskn. (Brassica)			Distrib. Turkey	
Ni	3960	Alyssum fallacinum Boiss. and Balansa (Brassica)			Distrib. Crete	
Ni	7700	Alyssum floribundum Boiss. and Balansa (Brassica)			Distrib. Turkey	
Ni	7390	Alyssum giosnanum Nyar. (Brassica)			Distrib. Turkey	
Ni	12500	Alyssum heldreichii Hausskn. (Brassica)			Distrib. Greece. Concentration of nickel in the seeds (1880 μg/g dry weight) is much lower than that in other plant parts.	
Ni	13500	Alyssum huber-morathii T.R.Dudley (Brassica)			Distrib. Turkey	
Ni	22400	Alyssum lesbiacum (P. candargi) Rech.f. (Brassica)			Distrib. Greece	
Ni	13700	Alyssum markgrafii O.E. Schulz (Brassica)			Distrib. Albania	
Ni	24300	Alyssum masmenkaeum Boiss. (Brassica)			Distrib. Turkey	
Ni	7080	Alyssum murale Wealdstandkit (Brassica)			Distrib. Balkans	
Ni	4590	Alyssum obovatum (C.A. Mey) Turez (Brassica)			Distrib. Russia	
Ni	7290	Alyssum oxycarpum Boiss. And Balansa (Brassica)			Distrib. Turkey	
Ni	7600	Alyssum peltarioides subsp. Virgatiforme Nyar. T.R. Dudley) (Brassica)			Distrib. Turkey	
Ni	21100	Alyssum pinifolium (Nyar.) T.R. Dudley (Brassica)			Distrib. Turkey	
Ni	22200	Alyssum pterocarpum T.R. Dudley (Brassica)			Distrib. Turkey	
Ni	12500	Alyssum robertianum Bernard ex Godronand Gren (Brassica)			Distrib. Corsica	
Ni	7860	Alyssum penjwinensis T.R. Dudley (Brassica)			Distrib. Iraq	
Ni	18900	Alyssum samariferum Boiss. & Hausskn. (Brassica)			Distrib. Samar	
Ni	up to 10,000 (leaves)	Alyssum serpyllifolium (Brassica)			Distrib. Portugal	
Ni	1280	Alyssum singarense Boiss. And Hausskn. (Brassica)			Distrib. Iraq	
Ni	10200	Alyssum syriacum Nyar. (Brassica)			Distrib. Syria	
Ni	6600	Alyssum smolikanum Nyar. (Brassica)			Distrib. Greece	
Ni	3420	Alyssum tenium Halacsy (Brassica)			Distrib. Greece	
Ni	11900	Alyssum trapeziforme Nyar. (Brassica)			Distrib. Turkey	
Ni	17100	Alyssum trodii Boiss. (Brassica)			Distrib. Turkey	
Ni	6230	Alyssum virgatum Nyar. (Brassica)			Distrib. Turkey	
Ni		Azolla filiculoides	Pacific mosquitofern	Cu(A), Pb(A), Mn(A)	Origin Africa; floating plant	
Ni	11400	Bornmuellaria sp. petri Greuter Charpion et Dittrich (Brassica)			Distrib. Greece	
Ni	21300	Bornmuellaria baldacii (Degen) Heywood (Brassica)			Distrib. Greece	
Ni	19200	Bornmuellaria glabrescens (Boiss. & Balansa) Cullen & T.R. Dudley (Brassica)			Distrib. Turkey	
Ni	31200	Bornmuellaria tymphea (Hausskn.) Hausskn. (Brassica)			Distrib. Greece	
Ni		Brassicaeae		Cd(H), Cs(H), Ni(H), Sr(H), Zn(H)	Phytoextraction	
Ni		Brassica juncea	Indian mustard	Cd(A), Cr(A), Cu(A), Pb(A), Pb(P), U(A), Zn(A)	cultivated	
Ni	H-	Burkea africana			Elevated levels of Ni in the embryonic axis in the seeds.	
Ni	1050	Cardamine resedifolia L. (Brassica)			Distrib. Italy	
Ni	540–1220	Cuscuta californica var. breviflora Engelm. (Cuscutaceae)			A parasite of Streptanthus polygaloides as well as other species, it can accumulate Ni if the plant host contains some. See 'metal tolerance' in Phytoremediation article.	
Ni		Helianthus annuus	Sunflower		Phytoextraction & rhizofiltration	
Ni		Hybanthus floribundus	Shrub violet			
Ni		Ocimum centraliafricanum	Copper plant	Cu(T), Ni(T)	Origin Southern Africa	
Ni	18900	Peltaria dumulosa Post (Brassica)			Distrib. Asia	
Ni	34400	Peltaria emarginata (Boiss.) Hausskn. (Brassica)			Distrib. Greece	
Ni	3140	Pseudosempervirum sempervium Boiss. And Balansa) Pobed (Brassica)			372 plants noted; origin California (distrib. Turkey)	
Ni	17600	Pseudosempervirum aucheri (Boiss.) Pobed (Brassica)			372 plants noted; origin California (distrib. Turkey)	
Ni	14,900 to 27,700, up to 32,000	Psychotria douarrei		Older leaves contain more Ca, Fe, and Cr than younger leaves, but less K, P, and Cu. Zn, Pb, Co, Mn, Mg show no significant variation due to leaf age.	Origin New Caledonia; 372 records of plants. Ni contents in leaves of P. douarrei vary considerably due to leaf age.	
Ni	17500	Rinorea bengalensis		Ni(H)	Origin Asia	
Ni	18000	Rinorea niccolifera	none	Ni(H)	Origin Philippines	
Ni	H-	Salvinia molesta	Water Fern	Cr(H), Ni(H), Pb(H), Zn(A)	Origin India	
Ni	H-up to 26% in xylem	Pycnandra acuminata			Origin Caledonia	
Ni	H-	Senecio coronatus			Presence of nickel in the part of the fruit covering the radicle and in the radicle itself.	
Ni	1000	Shorea tenuiramulosa (Dipterocarpaceae)			Philippine tree	Proctor et al. . (1989)
Ni		Spirodela polyrhiza	Giant Duckweed	Cd(H), Cr(H), Pb(H), Zn(A)	Native to North America	
Ni	21,500	Stackhousia tryonii Bailey (Stackhousiaceae)			Origin Central Queensland	Batianoff et al. 1990.
Ni	14800	Streptanthus polygaloides Gray (Brassica)	Milkwort Jewelflower		Ni-hyperaccumulation protects S. polygaloides against fungal and bacterial pathogens.	
Ni	2000	Thlaspi bulbosum Spruner ex Boiss. (Brassica)			Distrib. Greece	
Ni	16200	Thlaspi caerulescens	Alpine pennycress	Cd(H), Cr(A), Co(H), Cu(H), Mo(H), Pb(H), Zn(H)	phytoextraction	
Ni	52120	Thlaspi cypricum Brnm. (Brassica)			Distrib. Cyprus	
Ni	20800	Thlaspi elegans Boiss. (Brassica)			Distrib. Turkey	
Ni	3000	Thlaspi epirotum Halacsy (Brassica)			Distrib. Greece	
Ni	12000	Thlaspi goesingense Halacsy (Brassica)			Distrib. Greece	
Ni	2440	Thlaspi japonicum H. Boissieu (Brassica)			Distrib. Japan	
Ni	26900	Thlaspi jaubertii Hedge (Brassica)			Distrib. Turkey	
Ni	13600	Thlaspi kovatsii Heuffel (Brassica)			Distrib. Yugoslavia	
Ni	5530	Thlaspi montanum L. var. montanum (Brassica)			Distrib. U.S.A. Ni-hyperaccumulation protects T. montanum against fungal and bacterial pathogens.	
Ni	H-	Thlaspi pindicum (Brassica)			Sp. endemic to serpentine soils in Greece and Albania. Ni relatively abundant in some parts of the seed (mainly the micropyle).	
Ni	4000	Thlaspi ochroleucum Boiss. and Heldr. (Brassica)			Distrib. Greece	
Ni	35600	Thlaspi oxyceras (Boiss.) Hedge (Brassica)			distrib. Turkey, Syria	
Ni	18300	Thlaspi rotundifolium (L.) Gaudin var. corymbosum (Gay) (Brassica)			Central Europe	
Ni	31000	Thlaspi sylvium (as T. alpinim subsp. Sylvium) (Brassica)			Central Europe	
Ni	1800	Thlaspi tymphaneum Hausskn. (Brassica)			Distrib. Greece	
Ni	7000 ( only 54 in fruits)	Walsura monophylla Elm. (Meliaceae)			Origin Philippines.	Baker et al. (1992)

Notes

- In the genus Alyssum, free histamin (His) is an important Ni binding ligand that increases in the xylem proportionately to root Ni uptake. There is a close correlation between Ni tolerance, root His concentration, and ATP-PRT transcript abundance. Thus ATP-PRT expression may play a major role in regulating the pool of free His and contributes to the exceptional Ni tolerance of hyperaccumulator Alyssum species. But this is not the complete hyperaccumulator phenotype because His-(GM-)overproducing lines do not exhibit increased Ni concentrations in either xylem sap or shoot tissue.
- Alpine pennycress or «Alpine Pennygrass» is also found as «Alpine Pennycrest» in (some books).

== Reference sources with notes ==
- The references are so far mostly from academic trial papers, experiments and generally of exploration of that field.

== See also ==
- Phytoremediation, Hyperaccumulators
- List of hyperaccumulators
- Hyperaccumulators table – 3
