= Rhizofiltration =

Soil decontamination technique

Rhizofiltration is a form of phytoremediation that involves filtering contaminated groundwater, surface water and wastewater through a mass of roots to remove toxic substances or excess nutrients.

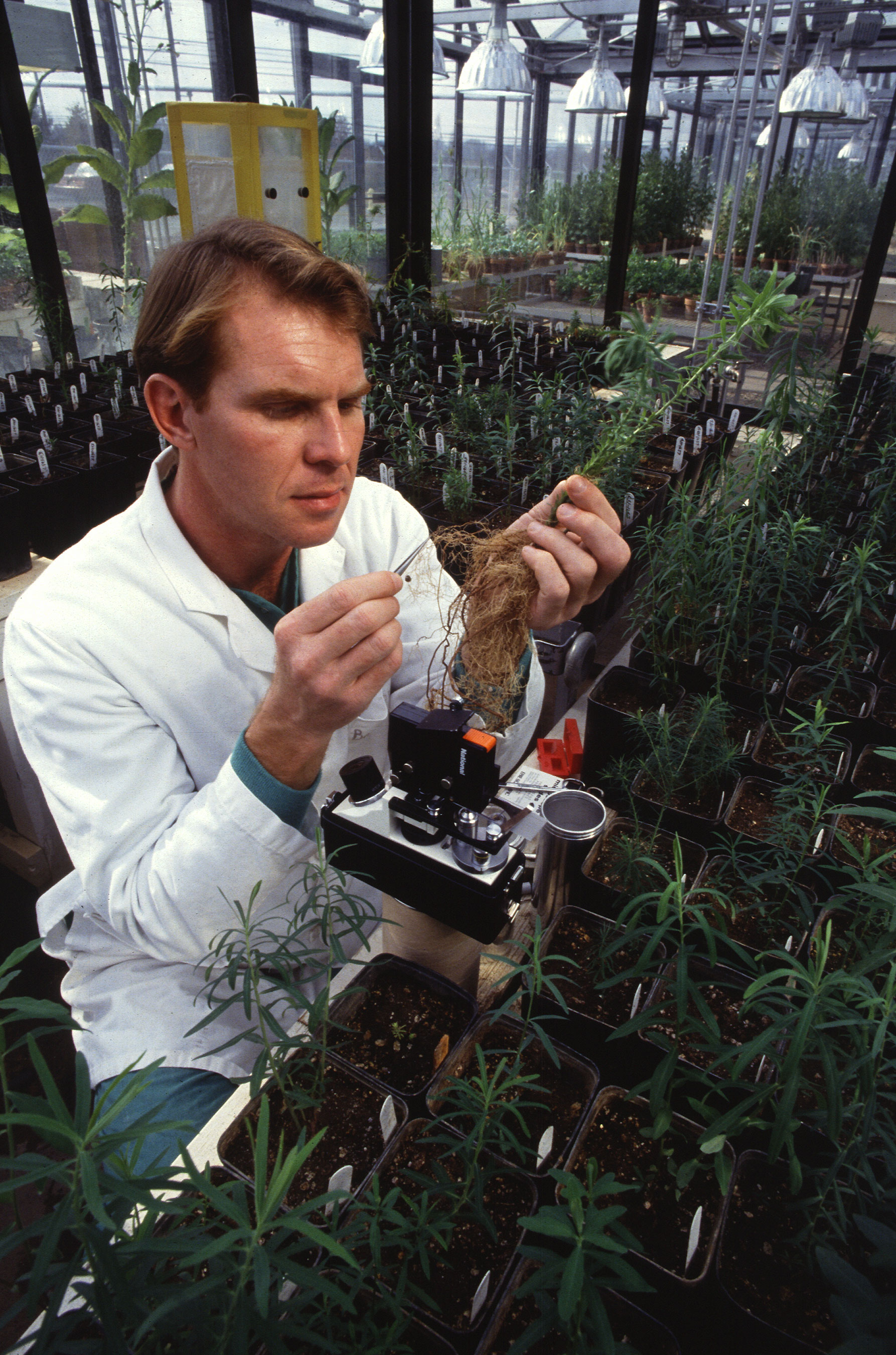
Studying plant roots

== Overview ==
Rhizofiltration is a type of phytoremediation, which refers to the approach of using hydroponically cultivated plant roots to remediate contaminated water through absorption, concentration, and precipitation of pollutants. It also filters through water and dirt.

The contaminated water is either collected from a waste site and brought to the plants, or the plants are planted in the contaminated area, where the roots then take up the water and the contaminants dissolved in it. Many plant species naturally uptake heavy metals and excess nutrients for a variety of reasons: sequestration, drought resistance, disposal by leaf abscission, interference with other plants, and defense against pathogens and herbivores. Some of these species are better than others and can accumulate extraordinary amounts of these contaminants. Identification of such plant species has led environmental researchers to realize the potential for using these plants for remediation of contaminated soil and wastewater.

== Process ==
This process is very similar to phytoextraction in that it removes contaminants by trapping them into harvestable plant biomass. Both phytoextraction and rhizofiltration follow the same basic path to remediation. First, plants that have stable root systems are put in contact with the contamination to get acclimated to the toxins. They absorb contaminants through their root systems and store them in root biomass and/or transport them up into the stems and/or leaves. The plants continue to absorb contaminants until they are harvested. The plants are then replaced to continue the growth/harvest cycle until satisfactory levels of contaminant are achieved. Both processes are also aimed more toward concentrating and precipitating heavy metals than organic contaminants. The major difference between rhizofiltration and phytoextraction is that rhizofiltration is used for treatment in aquatic environments, while phytoextraction deals with soil remediation.

== Applications ==
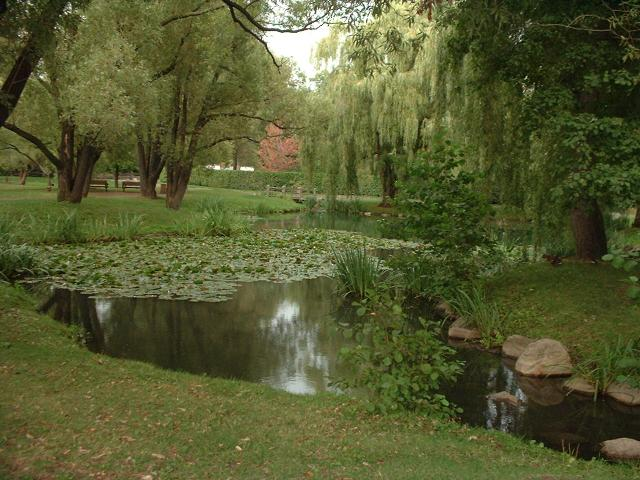
Weeping willows

Rhizofiltration may be applicable to the treatment of surface water and groundwater, industrial and residential effluents, downwashes from power lines, storm waters, acid mine drainage, agricultural runoffs, diluted sludges, and radionuclide-contaminated solutions. Plants suitable for rhizofiltration applications can efficiently remove toxic metals from a solution using rapid-growth root systems. Various terrestrial plant species have been found to effectively remove toxic metals such as Cu^{2+}, Cd^{2+}, Cr^{6+}, Ni^{2+}, Pb^{2+}, and Zn^{2+} from aqueous solutions. It was also found that low level radioactive contaminants can successfully be removed from liquid streams. A system to achieve this can consist of a “feeder layer” of soil suspended above a contaminated stream through which plants grow, extending the bulk of their roots into the water. The feeder layer allows the plants to receive fertilizer without contaminating the stream, while simultaneously removing heavy metals from the water. Trees have also been applied to remediation. Trees are the lowest cost plant type. They can grow on land of marginal quality and have long life-spans. This results in little or no maintenance costs. The most commonly used are willows and poplars, which can grow 6 - 8’ per year and have a high flood tolerance. For deep contamination, hybrid poplars with roots extending 30 feet deep have been used. Their roots penetrate microscopic scale pores in the soil matrix and can cycle 100 L of water per day per tree. These trees act almost like a pump and treat remediation system. Willows have been successfully used as “vegetation filters” for nutrient (e.g. nitrogen and phosphorus) removal from municipal wastewater and polluted groundwater.

== Common Plants ==
There are a series of aquatic and land plants that are used for rhizofiltration with varying degrees of success among them. While many of these plants are hyperaccumulators, other plant species can be used as the contaminants do not always reach the shoots (stems and their appendages: leaves, lateral buds, flowering stems and flower buds).

Some of the most common plant species that have shown the ability to remove toxins from water via rhizofiltration:

- Sunflower
- Indian Mustard
- Tobacco
- Rye
- Spinach
- Corn
- Parrot's Feather
- Iris-leaved Rush
- Cattail
- Saltmarsh bulrush
- Scirpus Robustus

== Cost ==
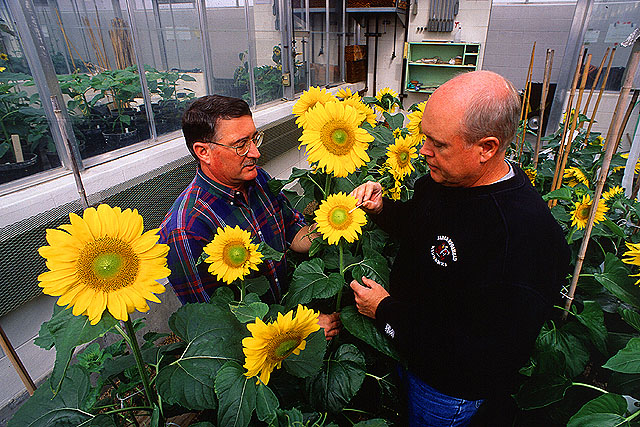
Sunflowers used for rhizofiltration

Rhizofiltration is cost-effective for large volumes of water having low concentrations of contaminants that are subjected to stringent standards. It is relatively inexpensive, yet potentially more effective than comparable technologies. The removal of radionuclides from water using sunflowers was estimated to cost between $2 and $6 per thousand gallons of water treated, including waste disposal and capital costs.

== Advantages ==
Rhizofiltration is a contamination treatment method that may be conducted in situ, with plants being grown directly in the contaminated water body or ex situ, where plants are grown off-site and later introduced to the contaminated water body. This allows for a relatively inexpensive procedure with low capital and operational costs, depending on the type of contaminant.

In some cases, contaminants have been shown to be significantly decreased in a very short amount of time. One study found that roots of sunflower reduced levels of Uranium by nearly 95% in just 24 hours.

This treatment method is also aesthetically pleasing and results in a decrease of water infiltration and leaching of contaminants.

After harvesting, the crop may be converted to biofuel briquette, a substitute for fossil fuel.

== Disadvantages ==
This contamination treatment method has its limits. Any contaminant that is below the rooting depth will not be extracted. The plants used may not be able to grow in highly contaminated areas. Most importantly, it can take years to reach regulatory levels. This results in long-term maintenance.

Also, most contaminated sites are polluted with many different kinds of contaminants. There can be a combination of metals and organics, in which treatment through rhizofiltration will not suffice.

Plants grown on polluted water and soils become a potential threat to human and animal health, and therefore, careful attention must be paid to the harvesting process and only non-fodder crop should be chosen for the rhizofiltration remediation method.

== See also ==
- Phytoremediation
- Hyperaccumulating Plants
- Biodegradation
- Bioremediation
