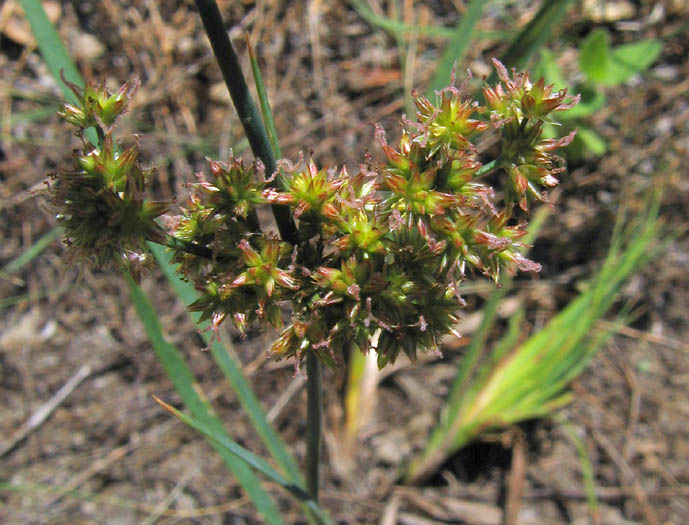

Scientific classification
- Kingdom: Plantae
- Clade: Embryophytes
- Clade: Tracheophytes
- Clade: Spermatophytes
- Clade: Angiosperms
- Clade: Monocots
- Clade: Commelinids
- Order: Poales
- Family: Juncaceae
- Genus: Juncus
- Species: J. J. xiphioides

Binomial name
- Juncus Juncus xiphioides E.Mey.

Synonyms
- Homotypic Synonyms: Verojuncus xiphioides (E.Mey.) Záv.Drábk. & Proćków; Heterotypic Synonyms: Juncus xiphioides var. auratus Engelm.; Juncus xiphioides var. littoralis Engelm.

= Juncus xiphioides =

Species of grass

Juncus xiphioides is a species of flowering plant in the family Juncaceae. It is sometimes referred to by the common name Irisleaf Rush. A perennial rush found growing in creek beds and freshwater marshlands of the Southwestern United States. It can be grown for phytoremediation or ornamental purposes.

The scientific name derives from the Latin jungere ("to join or bind"), as the stems were used for binding; and the Greek xiphos ("sword"), for its blade shaped leaves.

== Description ==
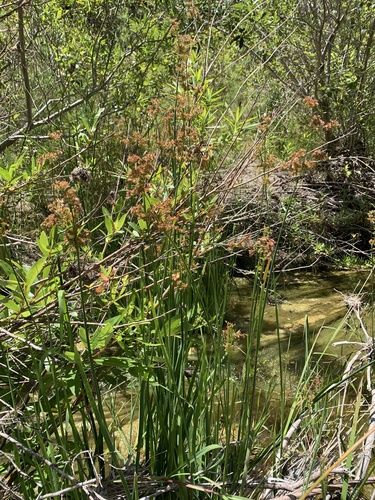

The plant can have multiple flat shoots growing off of one main stem. The stem grows vertically from 30 to 90 cm tall, with leaves growing at the base and top of stems in an alternate distichous arrangement. The leaves can grow to 40 cm long with a tapering shape that can be 14 mm at the widest point and 4 mm at the slimmest. The leaves predominantly appear green in color but can appear to be slightly red.

The plant's inflorescence has multiple branchlets, each with multiple flowering heads, growing off the main stem. The flowers usually remain enclosed in their bracts, only opening about 1-2 mm when the perianth spreads. The flowers inside are small and green, while the bract is green with a reddish tip. The flowers can range from a spherical to a more oblong shape and be 7-11 mm in diameter.

== Habitat ==
Juncus xiphioides are found growing in moisture-rich environments, such as creek beds, rivers, lakes, and freshwater marshlands. In those environments, the plant can grow in direct sunlight or in shaded areas. Due to the 2-3 mm rhizomatous roots, its growth cycle is perennial with a blooming period from early summer to fall.

== Environmental Benefits ==
Juncus xiphioides can be used to benefit the environment it is growing in multiple ways. The first way includes the roots of the plant being used to stabilize the soil it is planted in. Through the roots, water is filtered and assists with preventing erosion. A second way that the plant can improve its environment is through phytoremediation. In an environment where selenium, selenate in particular, is in excess, will be taken up by the rush and store it in its shoots. If a body of water is contaminated by agricultural wastewater that contains selenate, Juncus xiphioides can be used to clean the environment from the selenium. Selenium as a pollutant can cause plants to have multiple vital systems, such as the building of protein structures or the breaking down of nutrients, to not work properly. The growth and efficiency of a plant can be stunted by the presence of selenium or selenate in its ecosystem. Juncus xiphioides being able to take up large quantities of selenium from the environment, benefits the surrounding ecosystem.
