= Dynamic accumulator =

Dynamic accumulator is a term used in the permaculture and organic farming literature to indicate plants that gather certain minerals or nutrients from the soil and store them in a more bioavailable form and in high concentration in their tissues, then used as fertilizer or just to improve the mulch.

While this idea is quite common and often taprooted plants are used for this reason in companion planting, there is no scientific data supporting it, and the definition itself varies quite depending on the author. The closest thing with a proven scientific base are hyperaccumulators.

The first to use the term dynamic accumulator in the above definition was probably Robert Kourik in his book Designing and Maintaining Your Edible Landscape—Naturally (1986). Kourik later said that he wished he hadn't published that list of dynamic accumulators because it was anecdotal and unscientific. Later, many permaculturists have used dynamic accumulators in their design systems and methods, such as Eric Toensmeier, Dave Jake and Toby Hemenway.

== See also ==
- Hyperaccumulator
- List of hyperaccumulators
- Permaculture
