= De Ceuvel =

Circular office park on former shipyard in Amsterdam

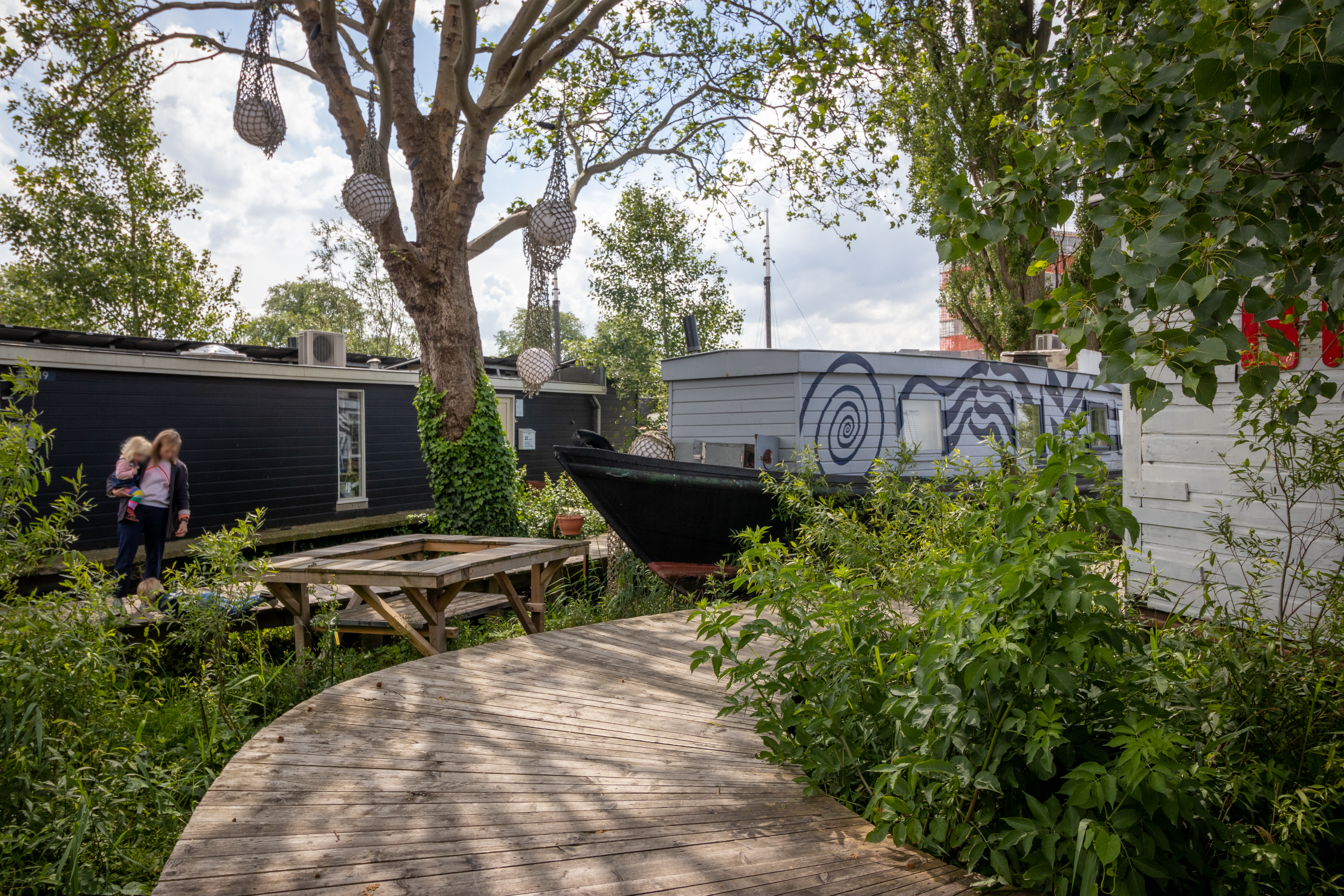
- Houseboats and jetty at De Ceuvel
- Other name: De Ceuvel-Volharding
- Location: Amsterdam
- Address: Korte Papaverweg 2-6, 1032KB Amsterdam

Technical details
- Buildings: 17
- Size: 1250 m2

De Ceuvel is a former shipyard in North Amsterdam, repurposed as a circular office park. Former houseboats hoisted onto the land are used as workspaces and ateliers for various creative and sustainable initiatives. Plants purify the polluted soil through phytoremediation and the terrain is used for various experiments with clean technologies. The terrain has a bed-and-breakfast and a cafe-restaurant which is famous for its sustainable approach.

== History ==
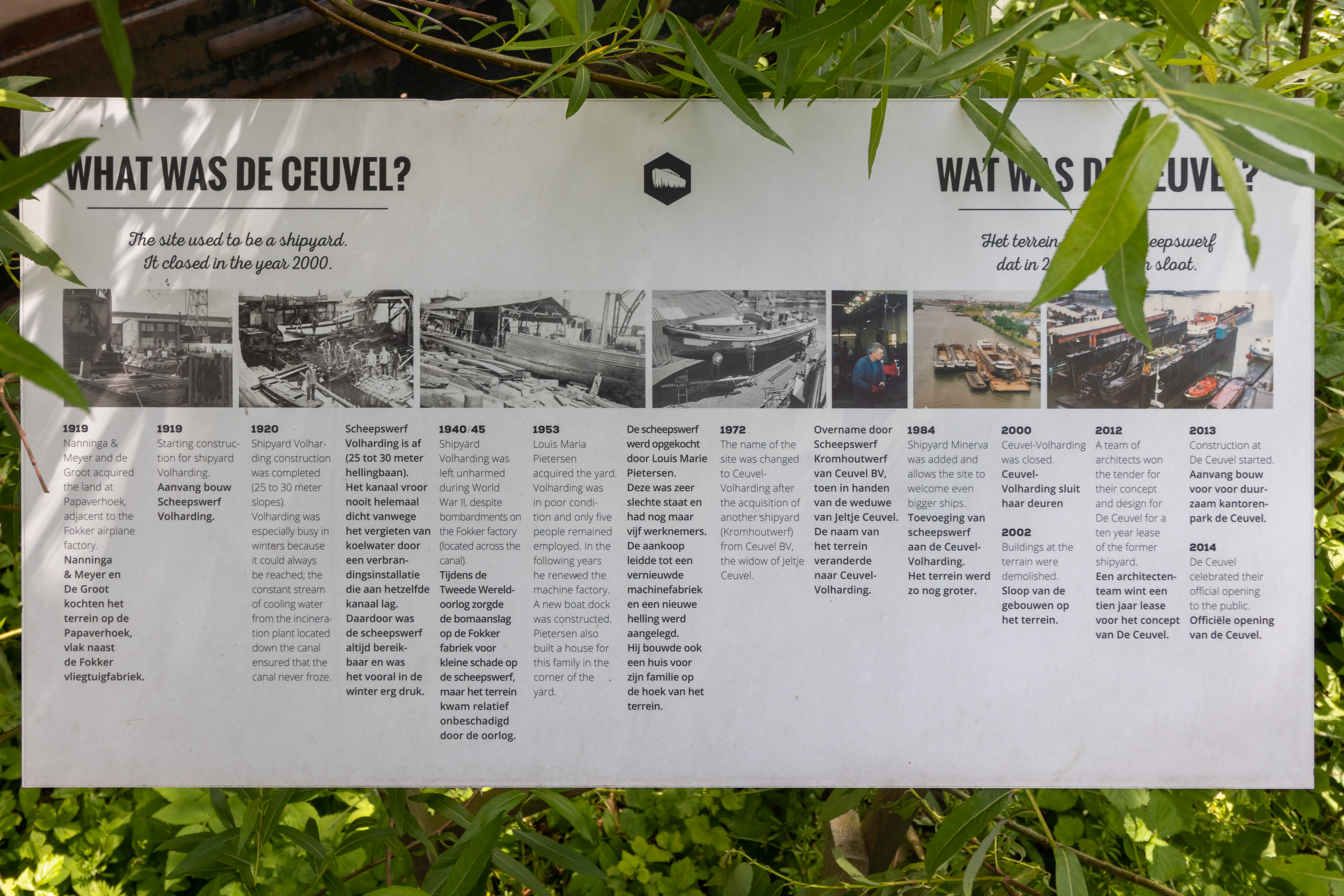
Timeline with pictures on an information sign at the terrain

In 1919 a shipyard was built next to the Fokker factory. Partly due to the ice-free water at the wharf in the winter, the company flourished from the 1920s. During World War II, it was slightly damaged by bombs dropping on the nearby Fokker factory. In the 1950s, Louis Marie Pieterson bought the shipyard in poor financial condition. He invested in a new engine room and a new pier and also built his private house in the yard of the shipyard. In the early 1970s, the De Ceuvel company bought the facility, which was expanded several times in the following years. However, the yard closed in 2000, partly due to competition and plans to build a bridge that would restrict access for ships. The shipyard buildings were demolished in 2002.

In 2012, a team of architects won a ten-year lease for their concept of sustainable office park De Ceuvel. Since 2013, houseboats have been hoisted out of the water and positioned on land. The site opened in 2014.

== Terrain and sustainable technologies ==
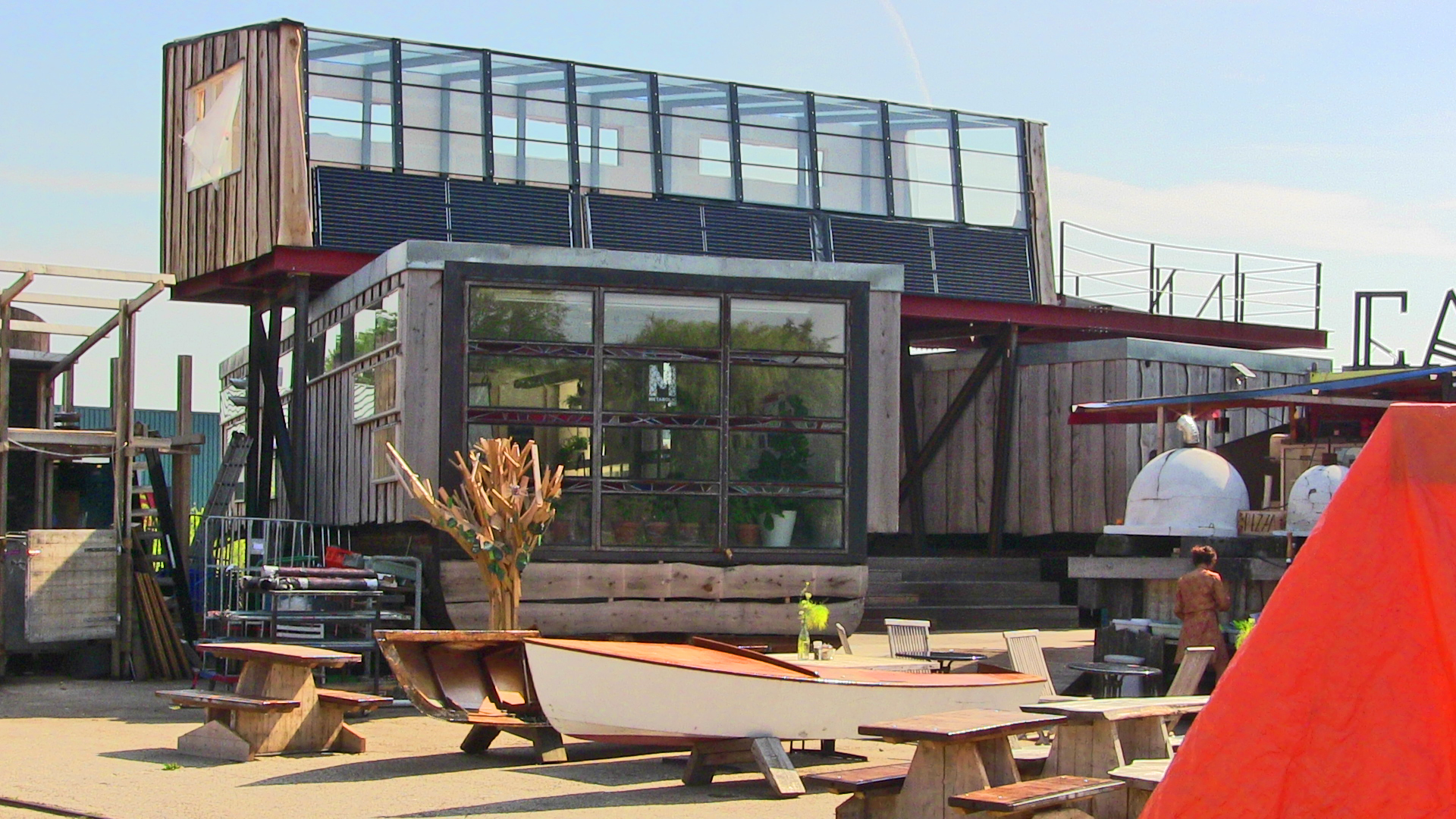
Repurposed houseboats at De Ceuvel

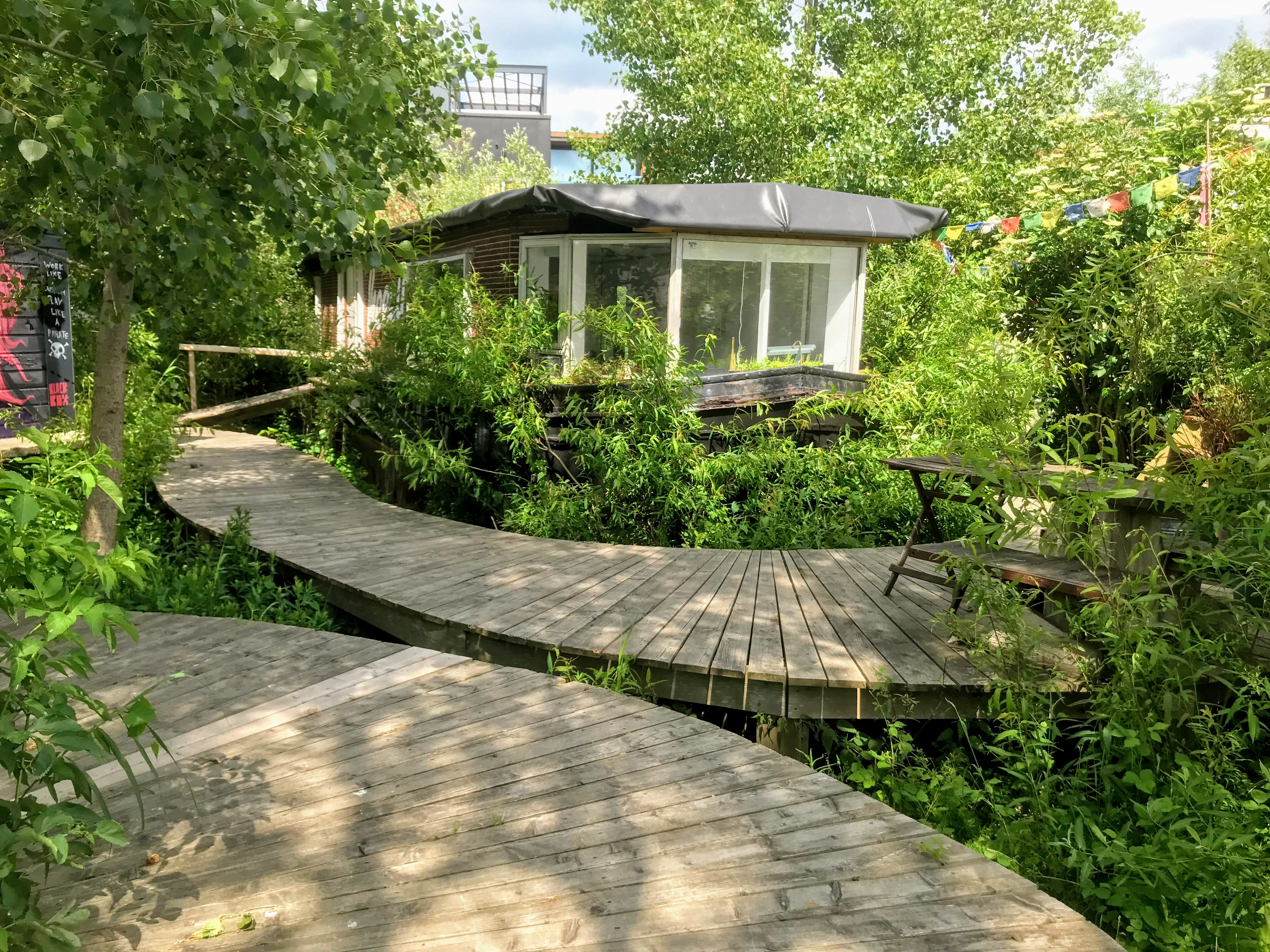
The boats are connected through a jetty on land

De Ceuvel is a site of 4470 m² located at the Van Hasselt Canal with 15 former houseboats on land. Due to the soil contamination, it was not possible to dig deeper than 50 cm for foundations or utility pipes, so that they run over the surface.

The boats were converted into offices, studios and workspaces. The architects, landscape planners and sustainability experts opted for low-cost solutions to make the boats largely self-sufficient, using solar heating, heat exchangers and composting toilets, as well as filtering and using rainwater and vegetable wastewater treatment. According to the operators, water consumption is around 75% lower than a conventional commercial space of this size. Plants are also used to clean the contaminated soil. They remove toxic metals from the soil through phytoremediation. Since 2017 De Ceuvel has experimented with blockchain technologies to be able to trade sustainable energy within the community.

The individual houseboats are connected by a winding plank-clad wooden jetty. In the center of the area, there is a café with a terrace and a bed and breakfast. The future destination of the site after ten years of interim use is still uncertain.

== Café de Ceuvel ==
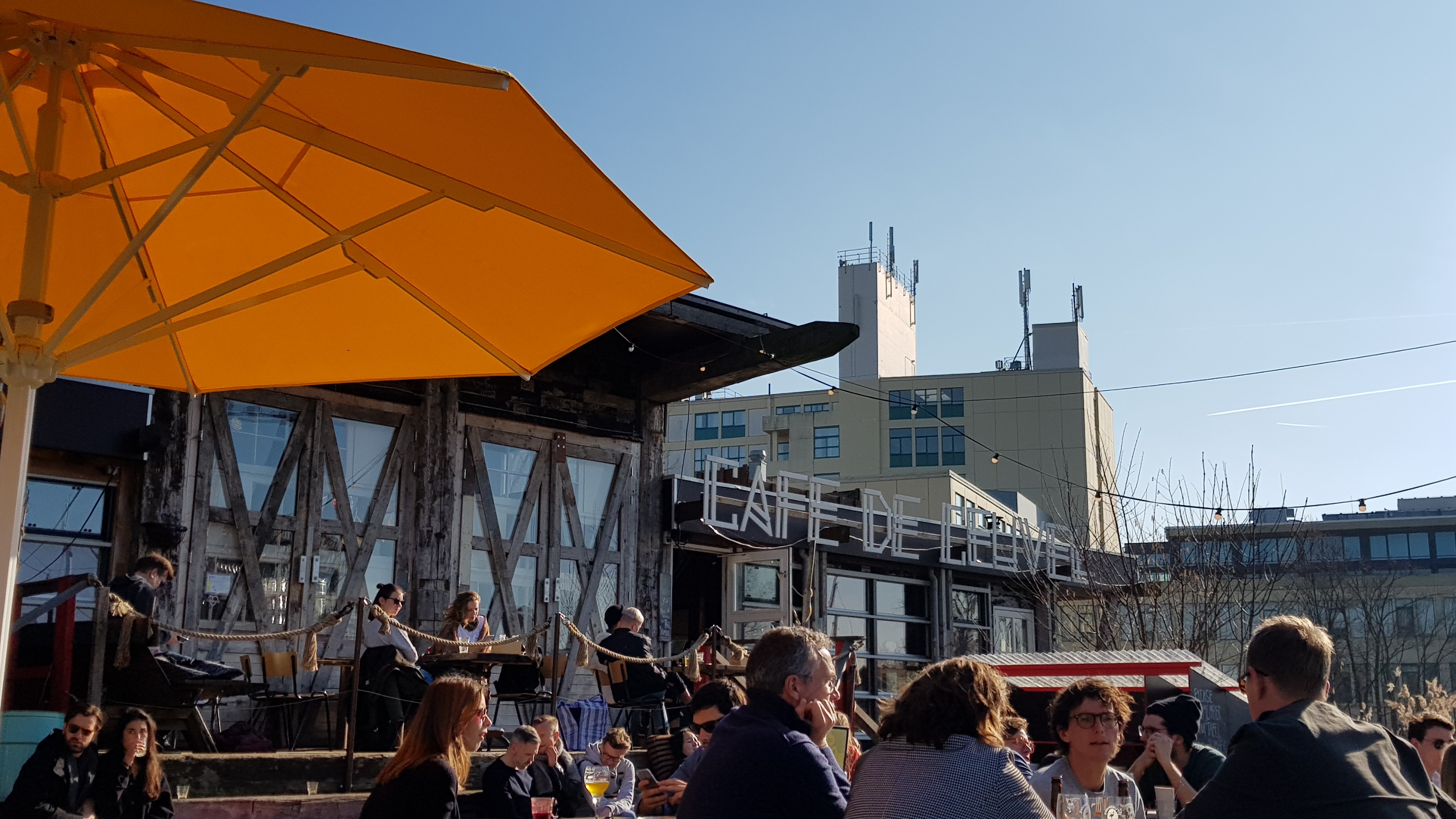
Café de Ceuvel

The cafe-restaurant, designed by architect Wouter Valkenier, was also built with recycled materials such as a former emergency brigade and 80-year-old bollards. The cafe has been praised for its radically sustainable approach, which cooks partly with ingredients from a greenhouse on the roof and organizes festivals around the theme. In 2017 a public broadcaster (NTR) made a documentary on the story behind the owners. The cafe was in the newspaper in 2021 as it convinced the Dutch Hospitality Pension Fund through a campaign to be the first fund in the country to divest from fossil fuels.
