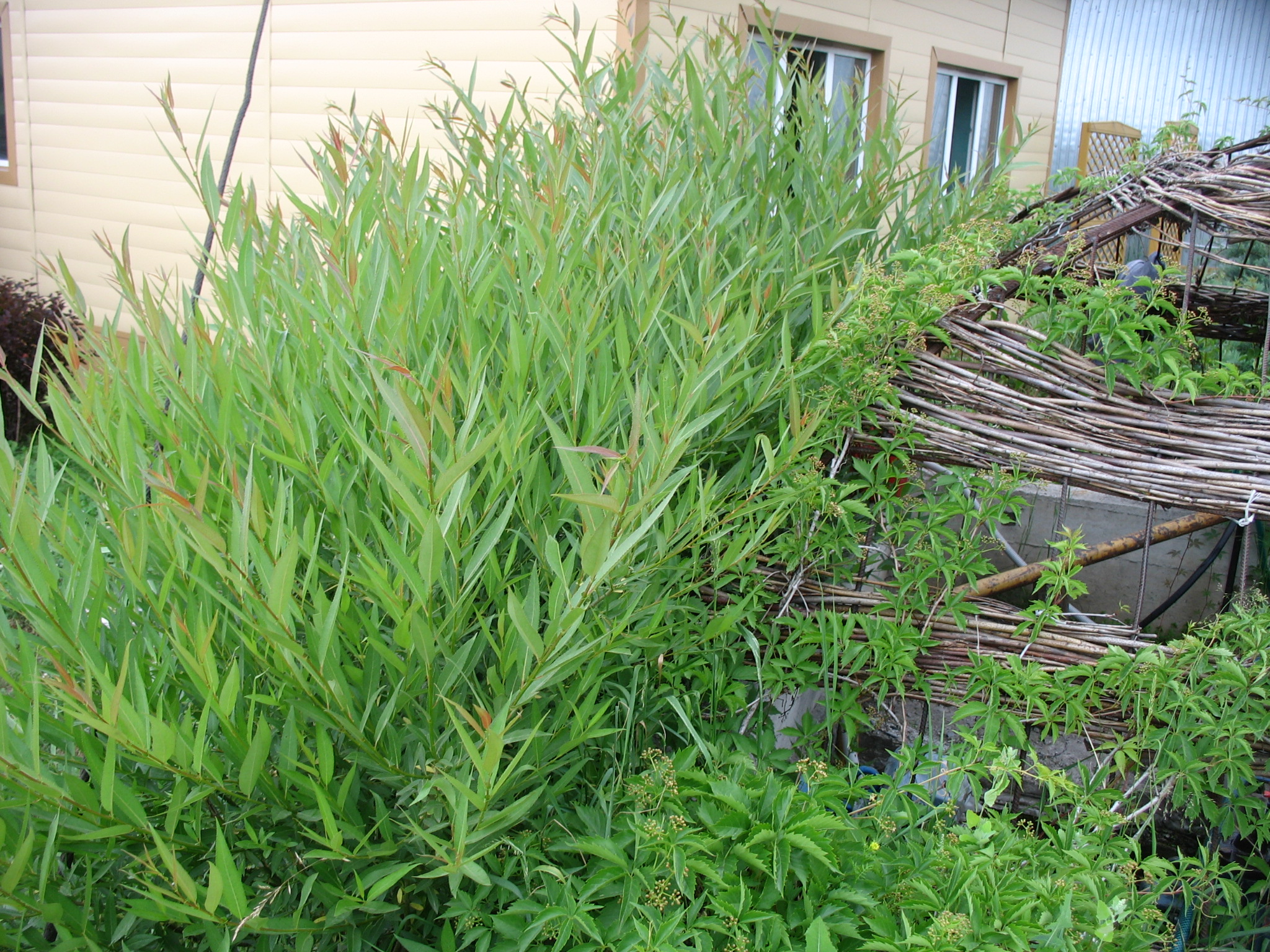

Conservation status
- Least Concern (IUCN 3.1)

Scientific classification
- Kingdom: Plantae
- Clade: Tracheophytes
- Clade: Angiosperms
- Clade: Eudicots
- Clade: Rosids
- Order: Malpighiales
- Family: Salicaceae
- Genus: Salix
- Species: S. miyabeana

Binomial name
- Salix miyabeana Seemen.

= Salix miyabeana =

Species of willow

Salix miyabeana is a species of willow native to northern Japan. It is a deciduous shrub or small tree, reaching a height of 6–7 m.

== Uses ==
Like many willow species, S. miyabeana is a dynamic biomass accumulator and is sometimes used in the phytoremediation of mercury polluted soils.
