= Kail =

- Municipality
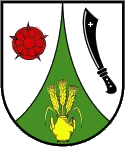
- Coat of arms

- Location of Kail within Cochem-Zell district
- Interactive map of Kail
- Location within Germany Location within Rhineland-Palatinate
- Coordinates: 50°11′6″N 7°14′37″E
- Country: Germany
- State: Rhineland-Palatinate
- District: Cochem-Zell
- Municipal assoc.: Kaisersesch

Government
  - Mayor (2019–24): Barbara Gehle

Area
  - Total: 6.16 km^{2} (2.38 sq mi)
- Elevation: 294 m (965 ft)

Population (2025-12-31)
  - Total: 289
  - Density: 46.9/km^{2} (122/sq mi)
- Time zone: UTC+01:00 (CET)
  - Summer (DST): UTC+02:00 (CEST)
- Postal codes: 56829
- Dialling codes: 02672
- Vehicle registration: COC
- Website: www.kail-eifel.de

Kail (German pronunciation: [kaɪl]) is an Ortsgemeinde – a municipality belonging to a Verbandsgemeinde, a kind of collective municipality – in the Cochem-Zell district in Rhineland-Palatinate, Germany. It belongs to the Verbandsgemeinde of Kaisersesch.

== Geography ==
=== Location ===
The municipality lies in the Eifel with the Moselle valley to the south. Lying to the east and west are the Pommerbach and Fellerbach valleys respectively, while the Kailer Hochwald (“Kail High Forest”) lies to the northwest.

=== Climate ===
Yearly precipitation in Kail amounts to 642 mm, which is rather low, falling into the lowest third of the precipitation chart for all Germany. Only at 29% of the German Weather Service's weather stations are even lower figures recorded. The driest month is February. The most rainfall comes in June. In that month, precipitation is 1.6 times what it is in February. Precipitation hardly varies and is spread rather evenly throughout the year. At only 15% of the weather stations are lower seasonal swings recorded.

== History ==
In 1121, Saint Castor's Foundation (a monastery; Stift St. Kastor) in Karden acquired holdings in cheledin, and history shows that these were still in the Foundation's hands as late as 1780. However, in 1806, during the French Revolutionary occupation, these holdings were auctioned off by the French.

The village was also mentioned in 1316 when the parish church in Pommern was incorporated into Himmerod Abbey.

The Rosenthal Cistercian Convent owned an estate in the village, as did also Himmerod Abbey, the Carthusian monastery at Trier, the Franciscan convent in Karden, Brauweiler Abbey in Klotten and the Cathedral Chapter at Trier. Among the nobles who had holdings in Kail were the Waldecks of Kaimt, the Barons Boos at Waldeck, the Barons of Gymnich and the Counts of Leyen. Furthermore, the Lords of Pyrmont owned serfs in Kail.

Although Kail had a church consecrated to Saint Bartholomew, it was parochially united with Pommern. The old chapel, which was deconsecrated sometime after 1905, was according to the ecclesiastical records built between 1698 and 1701. A new chapel was built between 1901 and 1903 to plans by government master builder and architect Leopold Schweitzer from Koblenz.

Beginning in 1794, Kail lay under French rule. In 1814 it was assigned to the Kingdom of Prussia at the Congress of Vienna. Since 1946, it has been part of the then newly founded state of Rhineland-Palatinate.

== Politics ==
=== Municipal council ===
The council is made up of 8 council members, who were elected by majority vote at the municipal election held on 7 June 2009, and the honorary mayor as chairman.

=== Mayor ===
Kail’s mayor is Barbara Gehle.

=== Coat of arms ===
The German blazon reads: Schild durch eingeschweifte Spitze, darin in Grün eine goldene Urne mit drei Ähren, gespalten; vorne in Silber eine rote Rose, hinten in Silber ein schwarzes Schindmesser.

The municipality's arms might in English heraldic language be described thus: Tierced in mantle, dexter argent a rose gules, sinister argent a flaying knife bendwise sable, the point to chief and in base vert an urn issuant from which three ears of wheat Or.

The urn refers to a prehistoric archaeological find and to the Roman origin of the placename Kail, which meant originally “Calidus’s homestead”. Prehistoric barrows from La Tène times can be found in the Kailerwald district. The ears of wheat are supposed to recall both the time when the village arose, having once been mentioned as an agricultural estate, and agriculture itself, which is still important in the municipality today. The Rosenthal Convent was a landholder in the village between 1547 and 1801, owning an estate and valuable lands. The charge on the dexter (armsbearer's right, viewer's left) side, a rose, is the Convent's armorial bearing. The flaying knife on the sinister (armsbearer's left, viewer's right) side is Saint Bartholomew's attribute, thus representing the municipality's and the church's patron saint. He has held this honour since the old chapel was built in 1698.

The arms have been borne since 16 December 1985.

== Culture and sightseeing ==
The village's main landmark is Saint Bartholomew's Catholic Parish Church. It was built between 1901 and 1903 and has windows with beautiful, vividly coloured stained glass.

The following are listed buildings or sites in Rhineland-Palatinate’s Directory of Cultural Monuments –

- Saint Bartholomew's Catholic Church (Kirche St. Bartholomäus), Hauptstraße 5 – Gothic Revival centrally supported building, 1901-1903; lava grotto with Gothic Revival sculptures
- Hauptstraße – wayside chapel, within a figure of Saint Anthony, 19th century
- Unterstraße 10 – Quereinhaus (a combination residential and commercial house divided for these two purposes down the middle, perpendicularly to the street), 19th century, stable; whole complex
- Unterstraße 16 – timber-frame house, partly solid, plastered, hipped mansard roof, 18th century; commercial wing, 19th century; whole complex of buildings
- At the Kreisstraße 30/Landesstraße 107 crossroads – wayside chapel; from 1891
