= National Institute of Educational Planning and Administration =

Indian research-focused university

Coordinates: 28.538836°N 77.191779°E

- Established: 1962; 64 years ago
- Affiliations: UGC
- Chancellor: Rama Shanker Dubey
- Vice-Chancellor: Shashikala Wanjari
- Location: South Delhi, India
- Campus: Urban
- Nickname: NIEPA
- Website: Official Web Site

National Institute of Educational Planning and Administration is a research focused university located in South Delhi, India. The institute was set up by the Ministry of Human Resource Development (now known as Ministry of Education), Government of India.

== History ==
National Institute of Educational Planning and Administration was established in the year 1962 as UNESCO Asian Centre for Educational Planners, Administrators and Supervisors which later became the Asian Institute of Educational Planning and Administration in 1965, which was later converted into the National Staff College for Educational Planners and Administrators in 1973, which was again rechristened as National Institute of Educational Planning and Administration (NIEPA) in the year 1979. In 2006, NIEPA was given the status of a Deemed to be University

== Departments ==
National Institute of Educational Planning and Administration has eight different academic departments and two centres for the better governance and management. These are-

- Department of Educational Planning – It is one of the fundamental divisions of NIEPA. The main function of the department is the integration of inputs, processes and products of planning at all levels. With the increasing emphasis on education as a means of reducing poverty and promoting sustainable development, the department considers the expanded scope of educational planning not only to cover the institutionalization of strategic planning at the macro level but also promoting decentralization and use of local level planning techniques such as school mapping, micro planning and school improvement planning for improving quality of investment in education.
- Department of Educational Finance – The function of this department is conduct and promote research on economic and financial aspects of education at all levels. The department focuses its activities like research, teaching and training, around issues relating to public and private financing of education.
- Department School and Non-Formal Education – This department focuses on critical issues of school education, non-formal and adult literacy. Research studies is conducted in various areas to develop and improve school education in India. Besides conducting research and developmental programmes, the department extends support to the state and central government in formulating and implementing plans and policies.
- Department of Educational Management Information System – To strengthen the database and management system on education in India, the department undertakes research, capacity building activities and provides technical advice. The department has also taken the responsibility for strengthening the management information system of secondary education. It has developed an information system, called DISE, to collect and compile detailed information on all schools in the country. District Information System for Education (DISE) is covering unrecognised schools and recognised and unrecognised madrasas since 2010–11. [7] The department also conducts conferences, seminars, workshops and research with regard to educational management information system.
- Department of Educational Administration – This department focuses on training and research on educational management and also planning and management of resources in education.
- Department of Educational Policy – The main activity of the department is training, research and dissemination. The department stimulates discussion on policy issues. It also conducts short term courses.
- Department of Higher and Professional Education – This department has constantly provided research support and policy advice to the Ministry of Human Resource Development, Government of India. It has provided academic support to regional conferences of UNESCO leading up to the world conference on Higher education and Planning Commission.
- Department of Training and Capacity Building in Education – Its mission is to expand the scope and coverage of training programmes and capacity-building initiatives of NIEPA. The aim is to create more stable and dedicated institutional arrangement for trained teams to help improve the design, implement, monitor and evaluate educational policies, plans and programmes.
- Centre for Policy Research in Higher Education
- National Centre for School Leadership

== Programmes ==
- Master of Arts in Education and Development (M.A.E.D.)
- Master of Philosophy (M.Phil.)
- Doctor of Philosophy (Ph.D.)
