= Athyrium yokoscense =

Scientific classification
- Kingdom: Plantae
- Clade: Tracheophytes
- Division: Polypodiophyta
- Class: Polypodiopsida
- Order: Polypodiales
- Suborder: Aspleniineae
- Family: Athyriaceae
- Genus: Athyrium
- Species: A. yokoscense

Binomial name
- Athyrium yokoscense (Fr. & Sav.) C. Ch.

Species of fern

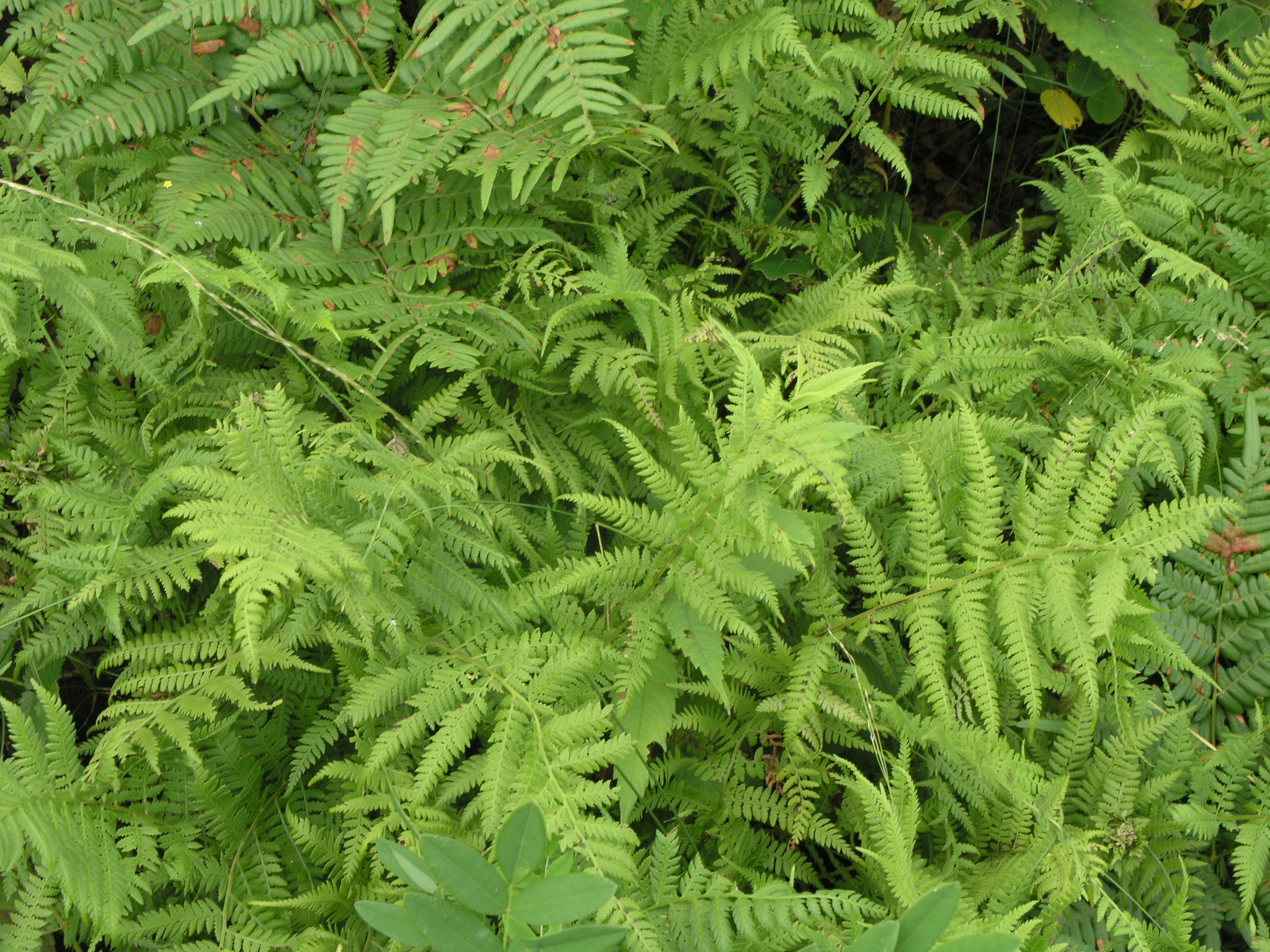
Athyrium yokoscense fern

Athyrium yokoscense, commonly known as Asian common ladyfern in English and as Hebino-negoza in Japanese, is a species of fern in the family Athyriaceae. These tough plants live primarily in and around mine sites and thrive in soils contaminated with high concentrations of heavy metals, such as zinc, cadmium, lead, and copper. A. yokoscense is indigenous to Japan, Korea, eastern Siberia and northeastern China and has been known for centuries to tolerate phytotoxic mining sites. The predominance and concentration of this fern species at a particular region was used to identify potential mining sites. The primary potential of A. yokoscense is in its phytoremediative ability to accumulate toxic metals from soils contaminated with heavy metals, so it may have some long-term commercial importance. No medicinal or culinary values of this fern species have been studied or confirmed.

== Morphology ==
A. yokoscense is similar to other species in the genus, Athyrium, and family, Athyriaceae. The plant typically grows to more than 0.2 metres (7.9 in) high and can tolerate high levels of heavy metals (arsenic, lead, cadmium, zinc, copper), which under many circumstances would kill other plants. This fern leaves resemble typical fern leaves. Not many publications and research have been made on the reproductive cycle of this fern species, but it is similar to the other ferns in the same genus. According to mygarden.net.au, these ferns "grow in heavy clay soils and prefer a moist sheltered site with moderately high atmosphere". Some ferns have been reported to contain carcinogens and others contain thiaminase, which robs the body of its vitamin B. This fern is generally not edible.

== Distribution and habitat ==
Athyrium yokoscense is found in and near mining sites across Japan, Korea, northeastern China, and eastern Siberia. It grows in metalliferous mining slag heaps, damp grounds, flat plains, as well as in thick woodlands and mountains. The abundance of this plant is an indicator of potential heavy metal-rich mines.

== Phytoremediation ==
The past decades of research into contaminated soil clean-up led scientists to adopt a greener way to solve this problem. Phytoremediation is a relatively new theory and practice to use plants to clean up soil contaminated with heavy metals instead of the need for heavy (and potentially toxic) chemicals. Athyrium yokoscense has been known for centuries to survive and thrive in and near mining sites in Japan. These mining sites contain soils with high concentrations of metal, including copper, cadmium, lead, arsenic, and zinc. No one knew the mechanism of how this fern species survive a toxic environment like this. Recently, with the green movements and environmental concerns for revitalizing mining sites and heavily contaminated fields, more researchers and industrialists are moving into a greener way of cleaning up the soil. Many papers have been published about the effects of heavy metals on the growth and reproduction of this fern, as well as the mechanism involved in its survival in these toxic environments.

Traditional toxic metal clean-ups are expensive and painstaking processes involving even more dangerous chemicals, but using plants to clean up the environment is greener, cheaper and may be more efficient, as well. A. yokoscense has the ability to not only survive the toxic heavy-lead environments, but also accumulate these heavy metals as well. This is extremely useful because harvesting these hyperaccumulator ferns will also detoxify the soil they live in. Studies have shown that this fern species accumulates heavy metal in its rhizoidal tissues (the fern's stem, which also acts like the plant's roots) during its sporophyte stage and in its prothallial tissues in its gametophyte stage.

It is believed that A. yokoscense's proanthocyanidins (condensed tannins) have a potential ability to chelate heavy metals, but this has not been confirmed yet. High levels of proanthocyanidins were found in both the leaves, as well as the rhizoids, yet only the rhizoids accumulate extremely high levels of heavy metals. Some researchers have found that these ferns do not accumulate heavy metal in the cells, but rather, in the cell walls.
