= Phytoremediation =

Decontamination technique using living plants

Some heavy metals such as copper and zinc are removed from the soil by moving up into the plant roots.

Phytoremediation technologies use living plants to clean up soil, air and water contaminated with pollutants. The term is an amalgam of the Greek phyto (plant) and Latin remedium (restoring balance). It is a type of bioremediation.

Phytoremediation is proposed as a sustainable alternative to conventional remediation methods, although it has never been used at large scales. Other forms of bioremediation, such as those employing microorganisms, have so far been more successful.

== Processes ==
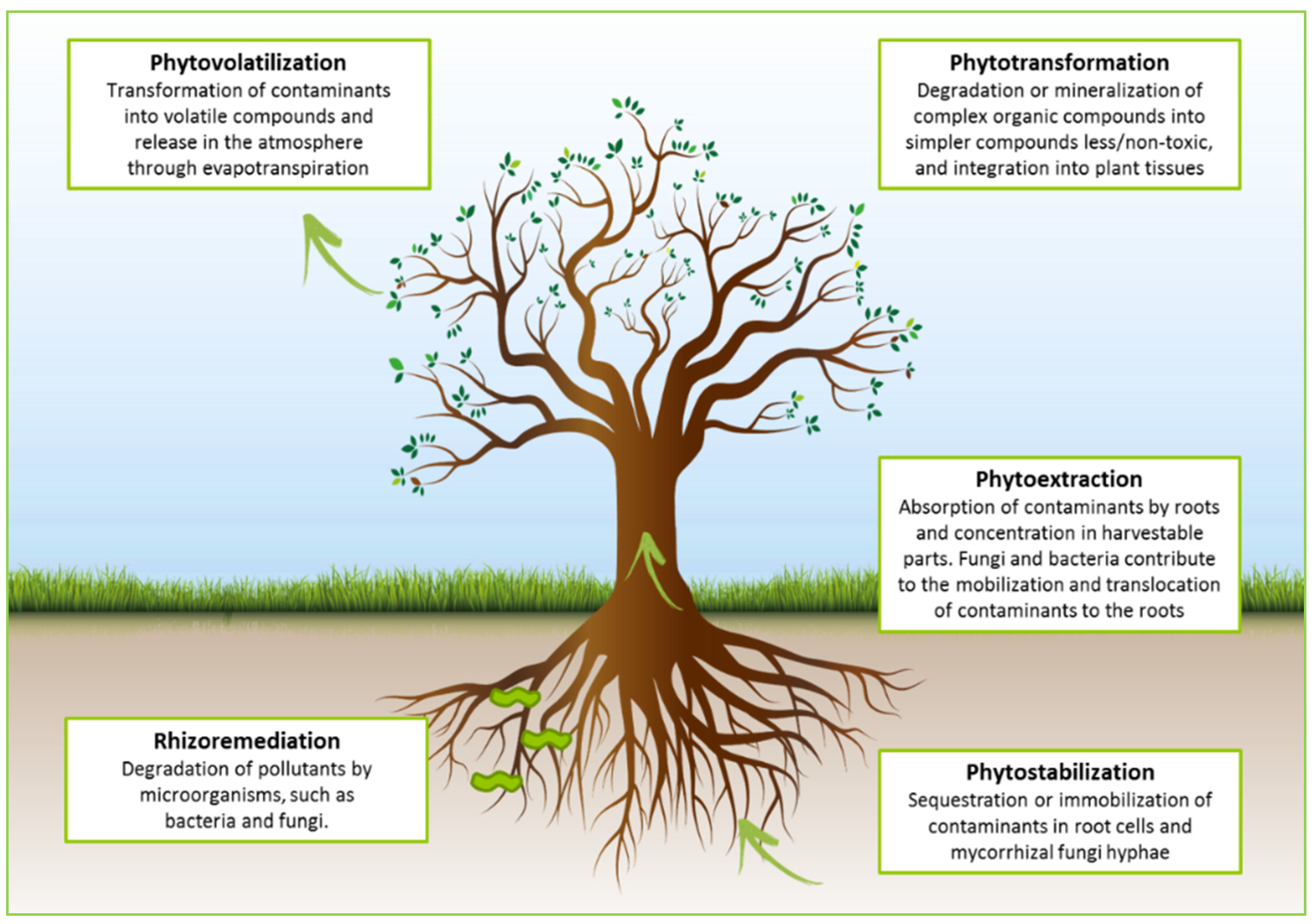
Mechanisms involved in hydrocarbon phytoremediation

Major phytoremediation mechanisms include phytoextraction, phytostabilization, phytovolatilization, and phytofiltration.

=== Phytoextraction ===
Phytoextraction (or phytoaccumulation or phytosequestration) aims to exploit the ability of some plants to absorb certain contaminants from soil or water. In principle, the roots take up substances from the soil or water and concentrate them above ground in the plant biomass.

Organisms that can uptake high amounts of particular metal-containing compounds are called hyperaccumulators. Since arsenic (As) is a toxic industrial by-product, As-accumulating plants -e.g. Chinese brake - have been proposed to concentrate and then remove As from contaminated soils.

Phytoextraction could also be performed by non-hyperaccumulating plants (e.g. Populus and Salix). Although they take up only low levels of pollutants, owing to their high growth rate, such plants could in principle remove a considerable amount of contaminants from the soil.

Hyperaccumulating plants are often metallophytes, i.e. they hyperaccumulate metals. Metallophytes are the basis of phytomining, a proposed technology for collecting valuable metals without excavating.

One challenge to phytoremediation is that heavy metals are often insufficiently mobile to be taken up by the plants, hyperaccumulators or otherwise. This challenge prompted the invention of assisted phytoextraction, whereby a chelator is added to soil to increase metal solubility or mobilization so that the plants can absorb them more easily. A typical chelator is edta.

=== Phytostabilization ===
Phytostabilization lowers the mobility of substances in the soil, for example, by limiting the leaching of substances from the soil. It focuses on the long term stabilization and containment of the pollutant. Unlike phytoextraction, phytostabilization focuses mainly on sequestering pollutants in soil near the roots but not in plant tissues. Pollutants become less bioavailable. Stabilization results in reduced erosion, runoff, leaching, in addition to reducing the bioavailability of the contaminant.

Phytostabilization involving a vegetative cap has been used to stabilize and contain mine tailings. Some soil amendments decrease radiosource mobility – while at some concentrations the same amendments will increase mobility. Root mats of meadow grasses are possibly effective at demobilising radiosource materials especially with certain combinations of other agricultural practices. The particular grasses are proposed makes a significant difference.

=== Phytodegradation ===
The roots secrete enzymes that degrade (breakdown) organic pollutants in the soil.

Phytodegradation (also called phytotransformation) is the use of plants to degrade organic pollutants. This process has been proposed to deal with herbicides, trichloroethylene, and methyl tert-butyl ether.

Phytotransformation, which is closely related to phytodegradation, is defined as the chemical modification of substances by plants, ideally with beneficial effects. The term "Green Liver" has been used to describe phytotransformation, as plants can be thought to behave analogously to the human liver when dealing with these xenobiotic compounds (foreign compound/pollutant).

Trinitrotoluene phytotransformation has been extensively researched and a transformation pathway has been proposed.

=== Phytostimulation ===
Phytostimulation (or rhizodegradation) is the enhancement of soil microbial activity for the degradation of organic contaminants, typically by organisms that associate with roots. This process occurs within the rhizosphere, which is the layer of soil that surrounds the roots. Plants release carbohydrates and acids that stimulate microorganism activity which results in the biodegradation of the organic contaminants. In the ideal case, the microorganisms detoxify pollutants.

Leaf litter and organic matter from plants can stabilize microbial soil biosiversity and minimize further loss of microogranisms from contaminants. Phytostimulation has been tested with petroleum, PCBs, and PAHs. Phytostimulation might also be applicable to atrazine degradation by hornwort.

=== Phytovolatilization ===
Contaminates are then broken down and the fragments are then subsequently transformed and volatilized into the atmosphere.

Phytovolatilization is the removal of substances from soil or water with release into the air, as a result of phytotransformation to more volatile and/or less polluting substances. Additionally, contaminants can be volatilized from the root zone. Evidence has been presented that selenium (Se) and mercury (Hg) can removed from soil through phytovolatilization. Selenium is volatilized as dimethyl selenide and mercury as the element. Poplar trees have been touted for removing VOCs, exploiting the high rate of transpiration for this tree species.

=== Rhizofiltration ===
Rhizofiltration is a process that filters water through a mass of roots to remove toxic substances or excess nutrients. The pollutants remain absorbed in or adsorbed to the roots. This process is often used to clean up contaminated groundwater through planting directly in the contaminated site or through removing the contaminated water and providing it to these plants in an off-site location. In either case though, typically plants are first grown in a greenhouse under precise conditions.

=== Biological hydraulic containment ===
Biological hydraulic containment occurs when some plants, like poplars, draw water upwards through the soil into the roots and out through the plant, which decreases the movement of soluble contaminants downwards, deeper into the site and into the groundwater.

=== Phytodesalination ===
Phytodesalination uses halophytes (plants adapted to saline soil) to extract salt from the soil to improve its fertility.

== Role of genetics ==
Breeding programs and genetic engineering are powerful methods for enhancing natural phytoremediation capabilities, or for introducing new capabilities into plants. Genes for phytoremediation may originate from a micro-organism or may be transferred from one plant to another variety better adapted to the environmental conditions at the cleanup site. For example, genes encoding a nitroreductase from a bacterium were inserted into tobacco and showed faster removal of TNT and enhanced resistance to the toxic effects of TNT. Researchers have also discovered a mechanism in plants that allows them to grow even when the pollution concentration in the soil is lethal for non-treated plants. Some natural, biodegradable compounds, such as exogenous polyamines, allow plants to tolerate higher concentrations of pollutants and increase pollutant uptake.

== Hyperaccumulators and biotic interactions ==
A plant is said to be a hyperaccumulator if it can concentrate the pollutants in a minimum percentage which varies according to the pollutant involved (for example: more than 1000 mg/kg of dry weight for nickel, copper, cobalt, chromium or lead; or more than 10,000 mg/kg for zinc or manganese). This capacity for accumulation is due to hypertolerance, or phytotolerance: the result of adaptative evolution from the plants to hostile environments through many generations. A number of interactions may be affected by metal hyperaccumulation, including protection, interferences with neighbour plants of different species, mutualism (including mycorrhizae, pollen and seed dispersal), commensalism, and biofilm.

Plant growth-promoting bacteria, or PGPB, are soil bacteria in the rhizosphere that enhance plant productivity by increasing nutrient bioavailability, secreting metabolites and hormones that stimulate increased plant growth, and secreting antibiotics that prevent pathogenic infection. PGPB have been shown to assist heavily with enhancing the transport of soil pollutants like heavy metals from the soil into the roots of hyperaccumulators via phytostimulation. PGPB increase transport speed by improving plant metabolic processes and biomass production, and by producing chelating or solubilizing agents that mobilize heavy metals, overall improving phytoremediation efficiency.

=== Tables of hyperaccumulators ===
- Hyperaccumulators table – 1 : Al, Ag, As, Be, Cr, Cu, Mn, Hg, Mo, Naphthalene, Pb, Pd, Pt, Se, Zn
- Hyperaccumulators table – 2 : Nickel
- Hyperaccumulators table – 3 : Radionuclides (Cd, Cs, Co, Pu, Ra, Sr, U), Hydrocarbons, Organic Solvents.

== Phytoscreening ==
As plants can translocate and accumulate particular contaminants, plants can be used as biosensors of subsurface contamination, thereby allowing investigators to delineate contaminant plumes. Chlorinated solvents, such as trichloroethylene, have been observed in tree trunks at concentrations related to groundwater concentrations. To ease field implementation of phytoscreening, standard methods have been developed to extract a section of the tree trunk for later laboratory analysis, often by using an increment borer. Phytoscreening could lead to more optimized site investigations and lower site cleanup costs. This concept is yet another example of phytoremediation that has achieved no practical application.

== See also ==
- Bioaugmentation
- Biodegradation
- Bioremediation
- Constructed wetland
- De Ceuvel
- Mycorrhizal bioremediation
- Mycoremediation

== Bibliography ==
- "Phytoremediation Website" — Includes reviews, conference announcements, lists of companies doing phytoremediation, and bibliographies.
- "An Overview of Phytoremediation of Lead and Mercury" June 6 2000. The Hazardous Waste Clean-Up Information Web Site.
- "Enhanced phytoextraction of arsenic from contaminated soil using sunflower" September 22 2004. U.S. Environmental Protection Agency.
- "Phytoextraction", February 2000. Brookhaven National Laboratory 2000.
- "Phytoextraction of Metals from Contaminated Soil" April 18, 2001. M.M. Lasat
- July 2002. Donald Bren School of Environment Science & Management.
- "Phytoremediation" October 1997. Department of Civil Environmental Engineering.
- "Phytoremediation" June 2001, Todd Zynda.
- "Phytoremediation of Lead in Residential Soils in Dorchester, MA" May, 2002. Amy Donovan Palmer, Boston Public Health Commission.
- "Technology Profile: Phytoextraction" 1997. Environmental Business Association.
- Vassil AD, Kapulnik Y, Raskin I, Salt DE (June 1998), "The Role of EDTA in Lead Transport and Accumulation by Indian Mustard", Plant Physiol., 117 (2): 447–53, doi:10.1104/pp.117.2.447, PMC 34964, PMID 9625697.
- Salt, D. E.; Smith, R. D.; Raskin, I. (1998). "Phytoremediation". Annual Review of Plant Physiology and Plant Molecular Biology. 49: 643–668. doi:10.1146/annurev.arplant.49.1.643. PMID 15012249. S2CID 241195507.
- Wang, X. J.; Li, F. Y.; Okazaki, M.; Sugisaki, M. (2003). "Phytoremediation of contaminated soil". Annual Report CESS. 3: 114–123.
- Ancona, V; Barra Caracciolo, A; Grenni, P; Di Lenola, M; Campanale, C; Calabrese, A; Uricchio, VF; Mascolo, G; Massacci, A (2017). "Plant-assisted bioremediation of a historically PCB and heavy metal-contaminated area in Southern Italy". New Biotechnology. 38 (Pt B): 65–73. Bibcode:2017NBiot..38...65A. doi:10.1016/j.nbt.2016.09.006. PMID 27686395.
- "Ancona V, Barra Caracciolo A, Campanale C, De Caprariis B, Grenni P, Uricchio VF, Borello D, 2019. Gasification Treatment of Poplar Biomass Produced in a Contaminated Area Restored using Plant Assisted Bioremediation. Journal of Environmental Management"
