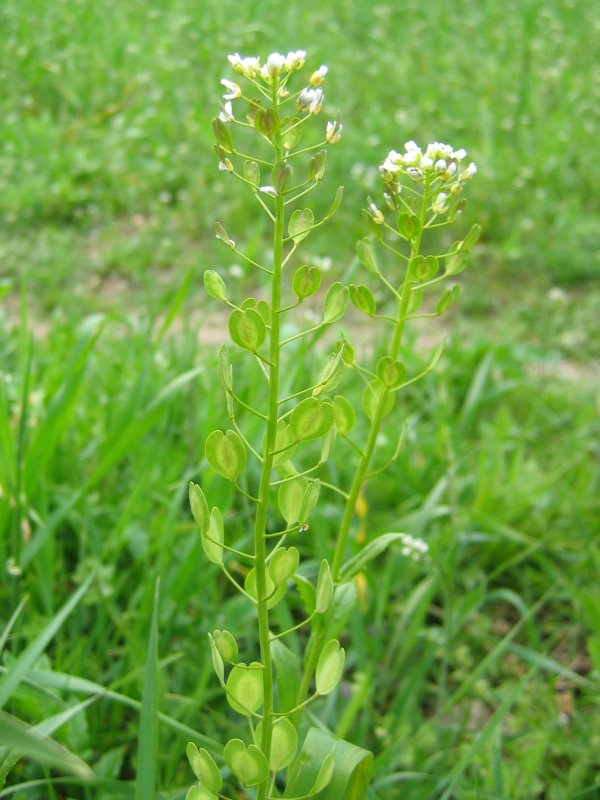
- Thlaspi arvense

Scientific classification
- Kingdom: Plantae
- Clade: Tracheophytes
- Clade: Angiosperms
- Clade: Eudicots
- Clade: Rosids
- Order: Brassicales
- Family: Brassicaceae
- Genus: Thlaspi; L.

Synonyms
- Carpoceras (DC.) Link; Cruciundula Raf.; Metathlaspi E.H.L.Krause; Teruncius Lunell; Thlaspidea Opiz; Thlaspidium Bubani; Thlaspius St.-Lag.

= Thlaspi =

Genus of herbs

Thlaspi, or pennycress, is a genus of herbs of temperate regions of the Eurasian continent. They occur in Central and South Europe, South-West Asia and two species are endemic to China. The Thlaspi has been proven to be a hyperaccumulator of heavy metals such as zinc and cadmium and therefore may be used in phytoremediation initiatives.

== Species ==
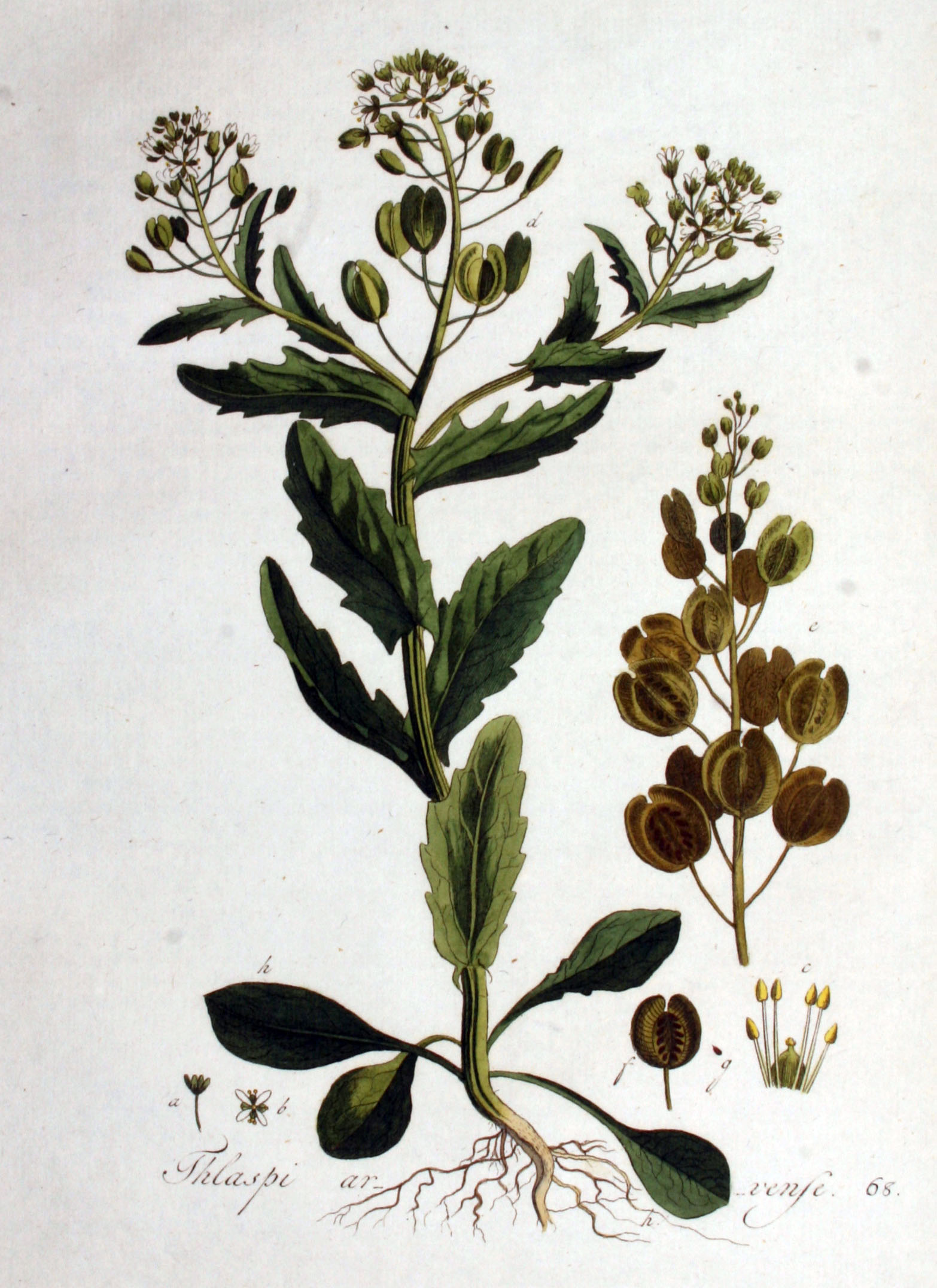
Thlaspi arvense

Nine species are accepted.

- Thlaspi armenum N.Busch
- Thlaspi arvense L. – field penny-cress
- Thlaspi brevistylum Mutel
- Thlaspi ceratocarpon (Pall.) Murray
- Thlaspi huetii Boiss.
- Thlaspi inhumile Ponert
- Thlaspi kochianum F.K.Mey.
- Thlaspi roseolum N.Busch
- Thlaspi syriacum Bornm.

=== Formerly placed here ===
- Mummenhoffia alliacea (L.) Esmailbegi & Al-Shehbaz (as Thlaspi alliaceum L.) – roadside penny-cress
- Noccaea arctica (A.E.Porsild) Holub (as Thlaspi arcticum A.E.Porsild) – arctic penny-cress
- Noccaea cypria (Bornm.) F.K.Mey. (as Thlaspi cyprium Bornm.) – Cyprus penny-cress
- Noccaea fendleri (A.Gray) Holub (as Thlaspi fendleri A.Gray) – Fendler's penny-cress
  - Noccaea fendleri subsp. californica (S.Watson) Al-Shehbaz & M.Koch (as Thlaspi californicum S.Watson) – Kneeland Prairie penny-cress
  - Noccaea fendleri subsp. idahoense (Payson) Al-Shehbaz & M.Koch (as Thlaspi idahoense Payson) – Idaho penny-cress
- Noccaea jankae (A.Kern.) F.K.Mey. (as Thlaspi jankae A.Kern.) – Slovak penny-cress
- Noccaea montana (L.) F.K.Mey. (as Thlaspi montanum L.) – alpine penny-cress
- Noccaea parviflora (A.Nelson) Holub (as Thlaspi parviflorum A.Nelson) – meadow penny-cress
- Noccaea perfoliata (L.) Al-Shehbaz (as Thlaspi perfoliatum L.) – Cotswold penny-cress
- Noccaea praecox (Wulfen) F.K.Mey. (as Thlaspi praecox Wulfen) – early penny-cress
- Noccaea rotundifolia (L.) Moench (as Thlaspi rotundifolium (L.) Gaudin) – round-leaved penny-cress
