= Thlaspi alpestre =

Thlaspi alpestre may refer to two different plant species:

- Thlaspi alpestre (L.) L., a synonym for Noccaea caerulescens
- Thlaspi alpestre Vill., a synonym for Noccaea caerulescens
- Thlaspi alpestre Jacq., a synonym for Noccaea alpestris
