= Del Norte County Airport =

Municipal airport serving Crescent City, California, United States

Del Norte County Regional Airport Jack McNamara Field

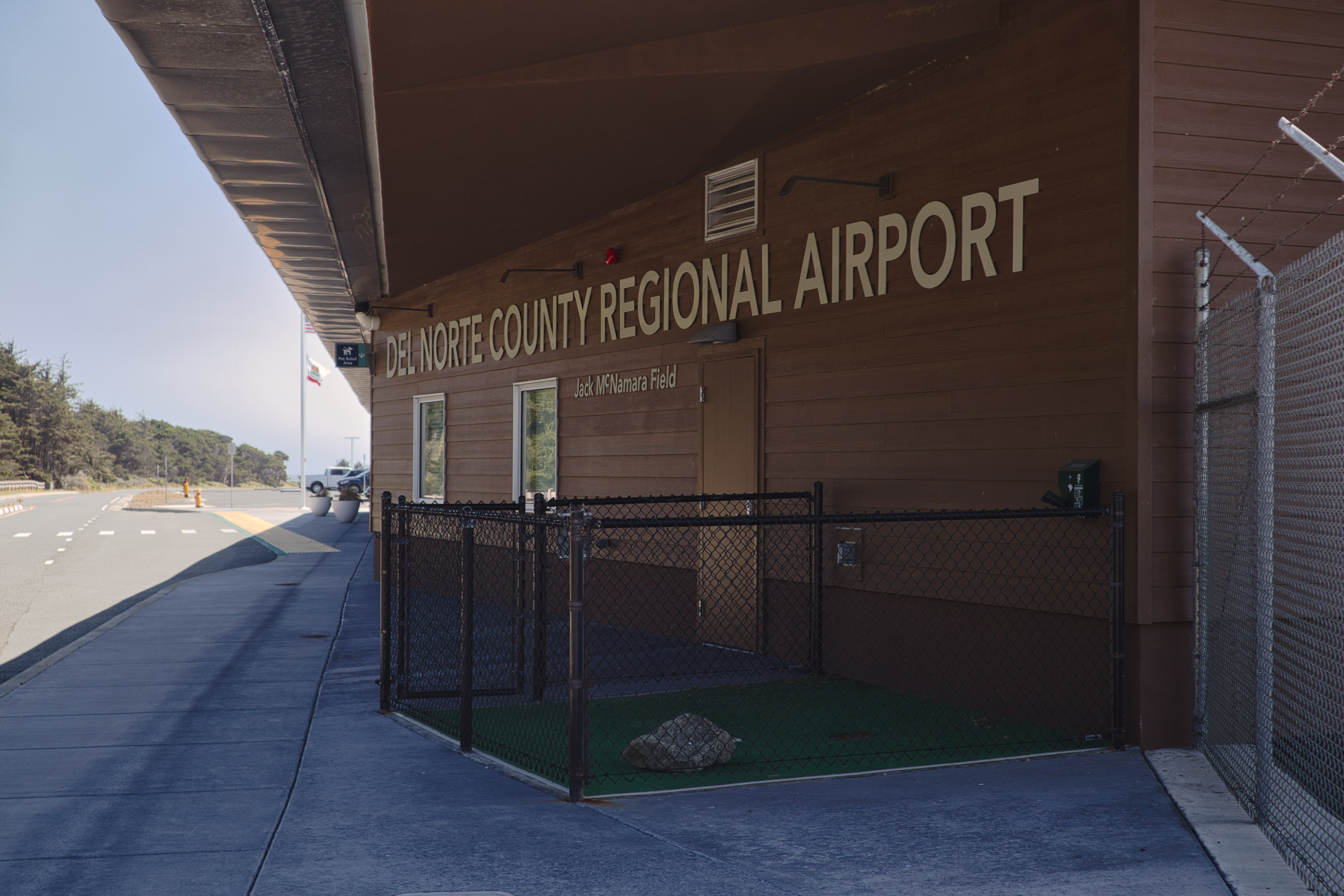
- IATA: CEC; ICAO: KCEC; FAA LID: CEC

Summary
- Airport type: Public
- Owner: Del Norte County
- Operator: Border Coast Regional Airport Authority
- Serves: Crescent City, California
- Elevation AMSL: 61 ft (19 m)
- Coordinates: 41°46′49″N 124°14′12″W
- Website: flycrescentcity.com

Map
- Location within California Location within the United States

Runways
Direction	Length		Surface
Direction	ft	m	Surface
12/30	5,002	1,524	Asphalt
18/36	5,000	1,523	Asphalt

Statistics (2019)
- Aircraft operations: 12,565
- Based aircraft: 17
- Source: Federal Aviation Administration

Del Norte County Regional Airport (IATA: CEC, ICAO: KCEC, FAA LID: CEC) (Jack McNamara Field) is a public airport three miles (4.8 km) northwest of Crescent City, in Del Norte County, California, United States. It has one airline flight per day to/from Oakland and Los Angeles/Hawthorne under the Essential Air Service program. The National Plan of Integrated Airport Systems for 2011–2015 categorized it as a primary commercial service airport (i.e. more than 10,000 enplanements per year).

== History ==
The airfield was used during World War II as Crescent City Outlying Field supporting Naval Air Station Alameda and a naval radio station at Point Saint George. High-frequency direction finding (HFDF) was used for radio intercept. These sites along the coast could track Japanese warships and merchant marine vessels as far away as the Western Pacific. The other stations in California were at Point Arguello, Farallon Islands and San Diego. Bainbridge Island, Washington also hosted a station.

== Facilities and aircraft ==
The airport covers 544 acres (220 ha) at an elevation of 61 feet (19 m). It has two asphalt runways: 11/29 is 5,000 by 150 feet (1,524 x 46 m) and 17/35 is 5,001 by 150 feet (1,524 x 46 m).

In the year ending July 31, 2019; the airport had 12,565 aircraft operations, average 34 per day: 72% general aviation, 27% air taxi, and 1% military. 26 aircraft were then based at the airport: 65% single-engine and 35% multi-engine.

== Historical airline service ==
By 1950 Southwest Airways Douglas DC-3s were flying to San Francisco, e.g. Crescent City - Eureka/Arcata - Fort Bragg/Mendocino - Ukiah - Santa Rosa - Vallejo/Napa - Oakland - San Francisco. Southwest Airways changed its name to Pacific Air Lines which in 1959 was flying DC-3s or Martin 4-0-4s Crescent City - Eureka/Arcata - San Francisco; Crescent City - Eureka/Arcata - Ukiah - Santa Rosa - San Francisco; or Crescent City - Eureka/Arcata - Redding - Red Bluff - Chico - Marysville/Yuba City - Sacramento - San Francisco. Also, nonstop between Crescent City and Medford, Oregon. By 1964 Pacific Air Lines was flying Fairchild F-27s and Martin 4-0-4s to Crescent City on similar multi-stop routings to San Francisco and nonstop to Portland. In 1968 Pacific Air Lines merged with Bonanza Air Lines and West Coast Airlines to form Air West which changed its name to Hughes Airwest in 1970. All Air West flights to the airport in 1968 were Fairchild F-27s. In 1972 Hughes Airwest F-27s flew San Francisco - Eureka/Arcata - Crescent City - North Bend, Oregon - Corvallis, Oregon - Portland, Oregon - Astoria, Oregon - Tacoma, Washington - Seattle. By 1980 Hughes Airwest was no longer serving the airport as it had retired its F-27s.

Several commuter airlines served the airport. In 1976 Eureka Aero Industries was flying nonstop to Eureka/Arcata continuing to Eureka's Murray Field airport with Cessna 402s. WestAir was serving the airport by the early 1980s and in 1985 was flying Cessna 402s nonstop to Eureka/Arcata and on to Sacramento. WestAir also offered connecting service via either Eureka/Arcata or Sacramento to San Francisco. WestAir became a United Express airline via a code sharing agreement with United Airlines and in 1994 was flying BAe Jetstream 31s Crescent City - Eureka/Arcata - Sacramento - San Francisco several times a day. In the late 1990s, WestAir was replaced by SkyWest Airlines which in 1999 was operating as United Express from the airport with nonstop and direct Embraer EMB-120 Brasilias to San Francisco International Airport.

In 2007 SkyWest operating as United Express was continuing to fly Embraer EMB-120s nonstop to both San Francisco and Eureka/Arcata with direct one-stop flights to Sacramento. Due to the 2013 imposition of new Part 121 air carrier flight, duty and qualification rules by the Federal Aviation Administration, SkyWest was forced to retire its fleet of E-120s due to a growing shortage of pilots and an inability to crew the E-120 in an economical manner. SkyWest ended all United Express service into Crescent City in mid-April 2015 because the airport runway could not accommodate its fleet of larger CRJ-200 regional jets. From August 2017, the only remaining passenger airline service, flown by PenAir with Saab 340s via a code sharing agreement with Alaska Airlines, operated nonstop to the Portland International Airport in Oregon. This service ended after PenAir filed for bankruptcy.

=== New airline jet service ===
On February 28, 2018 Contour Airlines announced it would begin flying an Embraer ERJ-135 regional jet between Crescent City and Oakland with service which began on April 11, 2018. This new service marked the first time Crescent City had scheduled passenger airline flights operated with a jet aircraft.

== Airlines and destinations ==
=== Passenger ===
According to FlightAware, scheduled passenger flights are currently being operated by Advanced Air with Dornier 328JET regional jets nonstop to Oakland (OAK).

Airlines	Destinations	Refs
Advanced Air	Los Angeles/Hawthorne, Oakland	

=== Cargo ===
Airlines	Destinations
Ameriflight	North Bend/Coos Bay, Portland (OR)
FedEx Feeder	Arcata/Eureka, Sacramento

== Statistics ==
Passenger boardings (enplanements) by year, as per the FAA
Year	2008	2009	2010	2011	2012	2013	2014	2015	2016	2017	2018
Enplanements	12,541	11,490	14,341	14,887	12,547	12,136	13,701	4,915	8,667	6,802	5,907
Change	▼8.42%	▼8.38%	▲24.81%	▲3.81%	▼15.72%	▼3.28%	▲12.90%	▼64.13%	▲76.34%	▼21.52%	▼13.16%
Airline	SkyWest Airlines dba United Express	SkyWest Airlines dba United Express	SkyWest Airlines dba United Express	SkyWest Airlines dba United Express	SkyWest Airlines dba United Express	SkyWest Airlines dba United Express	SkyWest Airlines dba United Express	SkyWest Airlines dba United Express	PenAir	PenAir	Contour Airlines
Destination(s)	Arcata-Eureka San Francisco	Arcata-Eureka San Francisco	Arcata-Eureka San Francisco	Arcata-Eureka San Francisco	Arcata-Eureka San Francisco	San Francisco	San Francisco	San Francisco	Portland	Portland	Oakland
Aircraft	Embraer 120 Brasilia	Embraer 120 Brasilia	Embraer 120 Brasilia	Embraer 120 Brasilia	Embraer 120 Brasilia	Embraer 120 Brasilia	Embraer 120 Brasilia	Embraer 120 Brasilia	Saab 340	Saab 340	Embraer 135
Subsidy	$957,025	$957,025	$957,025	$1,136,896	$1,136,896	$1,996,959	$1,996,959	$2,454,084	$3,506,231	$2,951,831	$3,310,503

== Other sources ==
- Essential Air Service documents (Docket DOT-OST-1997-2649) from the U.S. Department of Transportation:
  - Order 2004-7-29: re-selecting SkyWest, Inc., d/b/a United Express, to provide essential air service at Crescent City, California, at the annual subsidy rate of $816,025 per year for the period ending July 31, 2006.
  - Order 2006-6-15: re-selecting SkyWest Airlines, Inc., d/b/a United Express, to provide subsidized essential air service at Crescent City, California, for the two-year period from August 1, 2006, through July 31, 2008, at an annual rate of $957,025.
  - Order 2008-4-23: re-selecting SkyWest Airlines, Inc., d/b/a United Express, to provide essential air service at Crescent City, California, at an annual subsidy rate of $1,136,896, through July 31, 2010.
  - Order 2010-5-19: re-selecting SkyWest Airlines, Inc., d/b/a United Express, to provide essential air service (EAS) at Crescent City, California, at an annual subsidy rate of $1,781,888. The selection extends from August 1, 2010, through July 31, 2012.
  - Order 2012-5-21: re-selecting SkyWest Airlines, Inc., d/b/a United Express, to provide Essential Air Service (EAS) at Crescent City, California, for $1,996,959 annual subsidy.
