= Alpine pennycress =

Alpine pennycress is a common name for several plants and may refer to:

- Noccaea caerulescens, native to Europe
- Noccaea fendleri, native to western North America
