= Noccaeopsis =

Scientific classification
- Kingdom: Plantae
- Clade: Tracheophytes
- Clade: Angiosperms
- Clade: Eudicots
- Clade: Rosids
- Order: Brassicales
- Family: Brassicaceae
- Genus: Noccaeopsis; F.K.Mey.
- Species: N. kamtschatica

Binomial name
- Noccaeopsis kamtschatica (Karav.) F.K.Mey.

Synonyms
- Noccaea kamtschatica (Karav.) Czerepanov, S.K., 1981; Thlaspi kamtschaticum Karavaev

Genus of flowering plants

Noccaeopsis is a monotypic genus of flowering plants in the family Brassicaceae. It includes a single species, Noccaeopsis kamtschatica, which is endemic to the Kamchatka Peninsula and Commander Islands in the Russian Far East.

== Taxonomy ==
The species was first described as Thlaspi kamtschaticum by Mikhail Nikolaevich Karavaev in 1965. In 2010 Friedrich Karl Meyer placed the species in the newly-described genus Noccaeopsis as Noccaeopsis kamtschatica.
