= Rohnerville =

Rohnerville may refer to:

- Rohnerville, California
- Rohnerville Airport
- Rohnerville Rancheria
