= Sichuania =

Sichuania is a synonym for two genera of flowering plants:

- Sichuania M.G.Gilbert & P.T.Li, a synonym of Cynanchum L.
- Sichuania Y.Z.Zhao, a synonym of Noccaea Moench
