= Wild candytuft =

Wild candytuft is a common name for several plants and may refer to:

- Iberis amara, native to Europe
- Noccaea fendleri, native to western North America
