= Kneeland Airport =

- IATA: NLN; ICAO: none; FAA LID: O19

Summary
- Airport type: Public
- Operator: Humboldt County
- Location: Eureka, California
- Elevation AMSL: 2,737 ft (834 m)
- Coordinates: 40°43′09″N 123°55′39″W

Map
- Interactive map of Kneeland Airport

Runways
Direction	Length		Surface
Direction	ft	m	Surface
15/33	2,270	692	Asphalt

Kneeland Airport (IATA: NLN, FAA LID: O19) is a public airport operated by Humboldt County 10 miles (16 km) southeast of Eureka, California. Located on a mountain ridge at over 2,700 feet (820 m) above sea level, this airfield is used by general aviation aircraft, which sometimes seek an alternate airport when nearby low-lying airports are under fog. The airport has a California Dept. of Forestry (CDF) Helitack Station. Kneeland Airport is also used as an excellent sky watching location for the Humboldt Astronomers club.

== Facilities ==
Kneeland Airport covers 14 acres (57,000 m^{2}). Its one runway, 15/33, is 2,252 by 50 feet (686 by 15 m) and is asphalt paved.

== Ecology ==
The airport bisects the only known population of the Kneeland Prairie pennycress (Thlaspi californicum), a federally listed endangered plant species.

== Other local airports ==
- Arcata-Eureka Airport
- Eureka Municipal Airport
- Murray Field - in Eureka
- Rohnerville Airport
