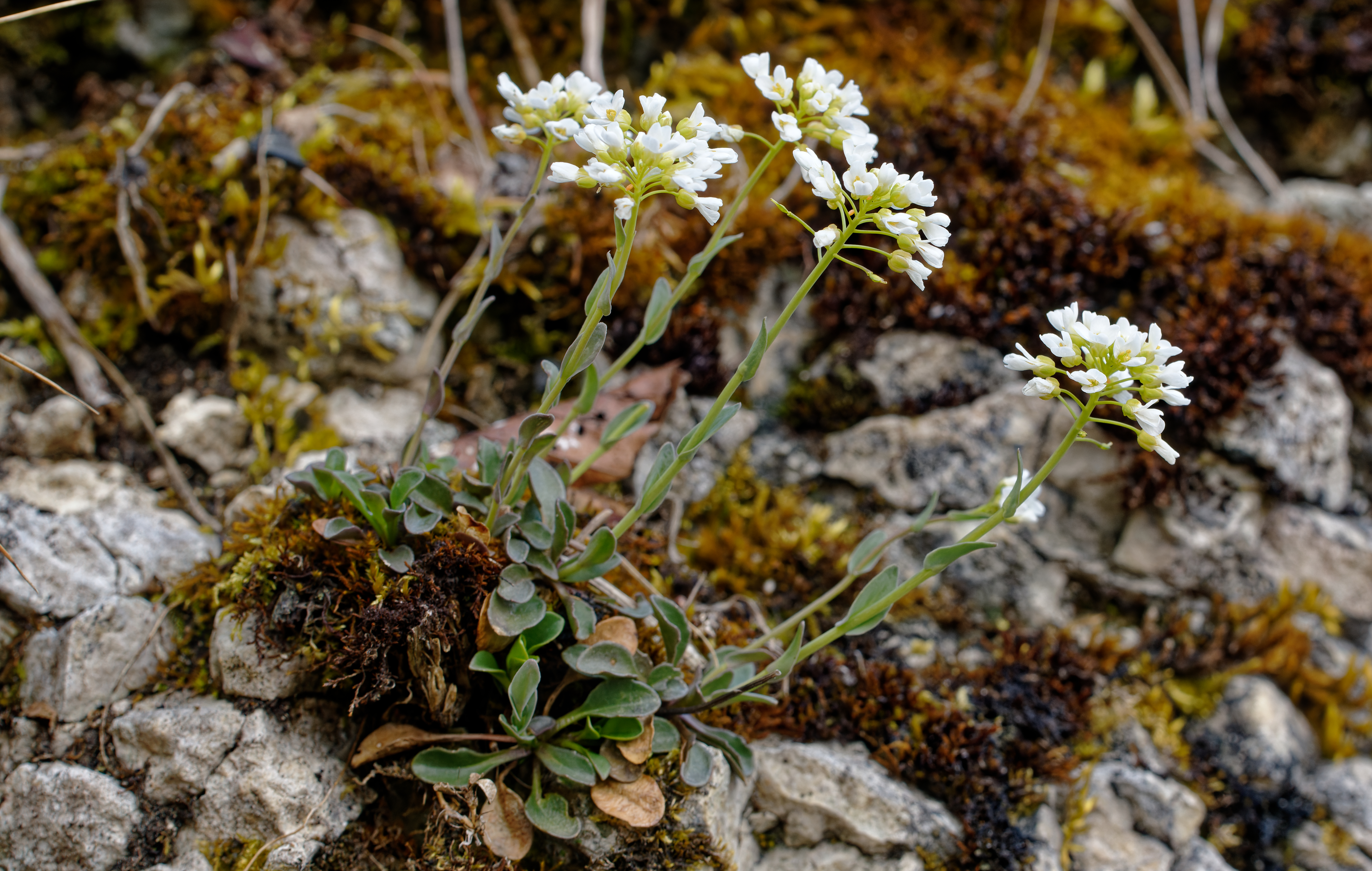

Scientific classification
- Kingdom: Plantae
- Clade: Tracheophytes
- Clade: Angiosperms
- Clade: Eudicots
- Clade: Rosids
- Order: Brassicales
- Family: Brassicaceae
- Genus: Noccaea
- Species: N. montana

Binomial name
- Noccaea montana (L.) F.K.Mey.

Synonyms
- List: Crucifera montana (L.) E.H.L.Krause; Thlaspi montanum L.; Draba carnica Scop.; Draba carniolica Vitman; Pterotropis beugesiaca (Jord.) Fourr.; Thlaspi beugesiacum Jord.; Thlaspi lotharingum Jord.; Thlaspi montanum subsp. lotharingum (Jord.) P.Fourn.; Thlaspi montanum proles lotharingum (Jord.) Rouy & Foucaud; Thlaspi spathulatum Gaterau

= Noccaea montana =

Species of flowering plant

Noccaea montana is a European species of flowering plant in the family Brassicaceae. Plants native to North America were formerly treated as Noccea montana, but are now recognized as a distinct species, Noccaea fendleri.

== Distribution and habitat ==
Noccaea montana is native to France and Central Europe.
