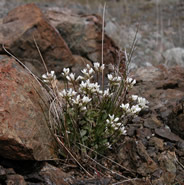

Scientific classification
- Kingdom: Plantae
- Clade: Tracheophytes
- Clade: Angiosperms
- Clade: Eudicots
- Clade: Rosids
- Order: Brassicales
- Family: Brassicaceae
- Genus: Noccaea
- Species: N. fendleri
- Subspecies: N. f. subsp. californica

Trinomial name
- Noccaea fendleri subsp. californica (S.Watson) Al-Shehbaz & M.Koch

Synonyms
- Thlaspi alpestre var. californicum (S.Watson) Jeps.; Thlaspi californicum S.Watson; Thlaspi glaucum subsp. californicum (S.Watson) Munz; Thlaspi montanum var. californicum (S.Watson) P.K.Holmgren

= Noccaea fendleri subsp. californica =

Species of flowering plant

Noccaea fendleri subsp. californica is a rare subspecies of flowering plant in the family Brassicaceae known by the common name Kneeland Prairie penny-cress. It is endemic to California, where it is known from only one stretch of grassland in Humboldt County. It is threatened by development. It is a federally listed endangered species of the United States.

The taxonomy of this species is uncertain. Authors call it Thlaspi californicum, Thlaspi montanum var. californicum, Noccaea californica, and Noccaea fendleri ssp. californica, and there are other synonyms.

This plant is a perennial herb growing roughly 10 centimeters tall, the height varying from 1 to 20 centimeters. There are spatula-shaped lower leaves a few centimeters long and a few leaves higher on the plant. The inflorescence is a raceme of mustardlike flowers with white spoon-shaped petals just under a centimeter in length. The fruit is a silique. The plant often reproduces vegetatively by cloning.

As of 2000 there was only one population of this plant. It is located adjacent to the Kneeland Airport on the Kneeland Prairie near Eureka in Humboldt County. In the area there are three colonies growing on separate serpentine outcrops on the prairie. Two of the colonies are separated by the Kneeland Airport. The plant is limited to the serpentine soils of the local landscape.

This plant is threatened by development at the airport and other facilities nearby, including roads and a helitack base. In the past few decades the amount of available habitat has been decreased 50% or more, possibly as much as 70%. It has also led to habitat fragmentation as the population is bisected by the airport and the road. Planned expansion projects at the airport, including installation of a parking lot, may reduce the amount of suitable habitat further.
