= Rohnerville Airport =

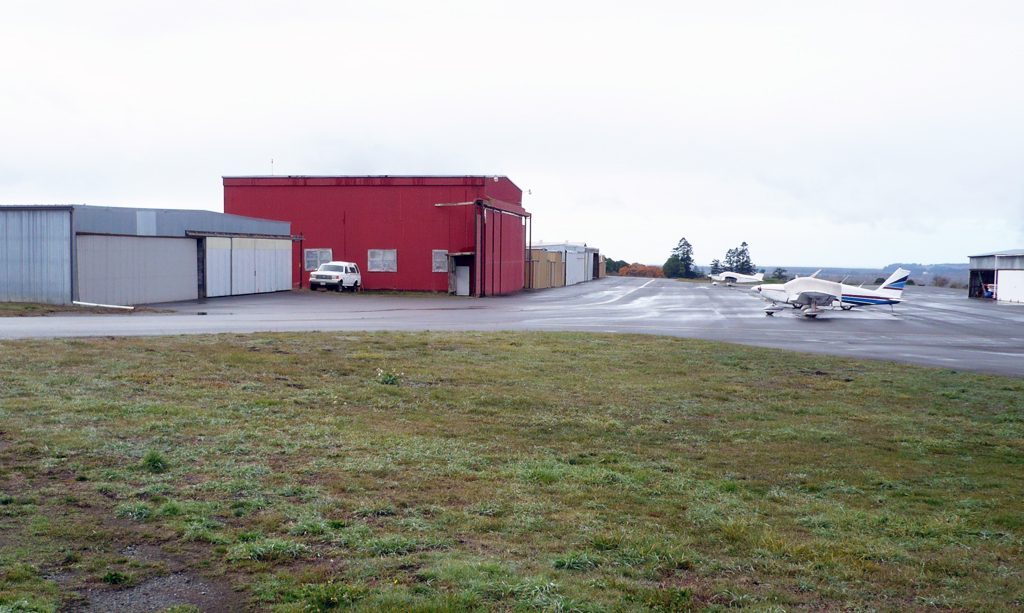
- IATA: none; ICAO: KFOT; FAA LID: FOT

Summary
- Airport type: Public
- Owner: Humboldt County
- Location: Fortuna, California
- Elevation AMSL: 392 ft / 119 m
- Coordinates: 40°33′14″N 124°07′58″W

Map
- Interactive map of Rohnerville Airport

Runways
Direction	Length		Surface
Direction	ft	m	Surface
11/29	4,005	1,221	Asphalt

Statistics (2004)
- Aircraft operations: 27,500
- Based aircraft: 36
- Source: Federal Aviation Administration

Rohnerville Airport (ICAO: KFOT, FAA LID: FOT) is a public airport located 3 miles (4.8 km) southeast of Fortuna in Humboldt County, California. It is owned by the County of Humboldt.

Although most U.S. airports use the same three-letter location identifier for the FAA and IATA, Rohnerville Airport is assigned FOT by the FAA but has no designation from the IATA (which assigned FOT to Forster, New South Wales, Australia).

== Facilities and aircraft ==
Rohnerville Airport covers an area of 541 acres (219 ha) which contains one asphalt paved runway (11/29) measuring 4,005 by 100 feet (1,221 by 30 m) and has favorable inland weather.

For the year ending in October 2004, the airport had 27,500 aircraft operations, an average of 75 per day, all of which were general aviation. There were 36 aircraft based at this airport: 86% single engine, 11% multi-engine and 3% helicopters. 18 county-owned hangars are located at Rohnerville Airport.

Cal Fire provides wildfire suppression support using its air base at the airport with an OV-10 Bronco and a S-2T airtanker based there. Rohnerville Airport "has the longest and widest runway of all Humboldt County general aviation airports enabling it to accommodate larger aircraft". It is also used for medical evacuations and other emergency services.

== Nearby airports ==
- Arcata-Eureka Airport
- Eureka Municipal Airport
- Kneeland Airport
- Murray Field
