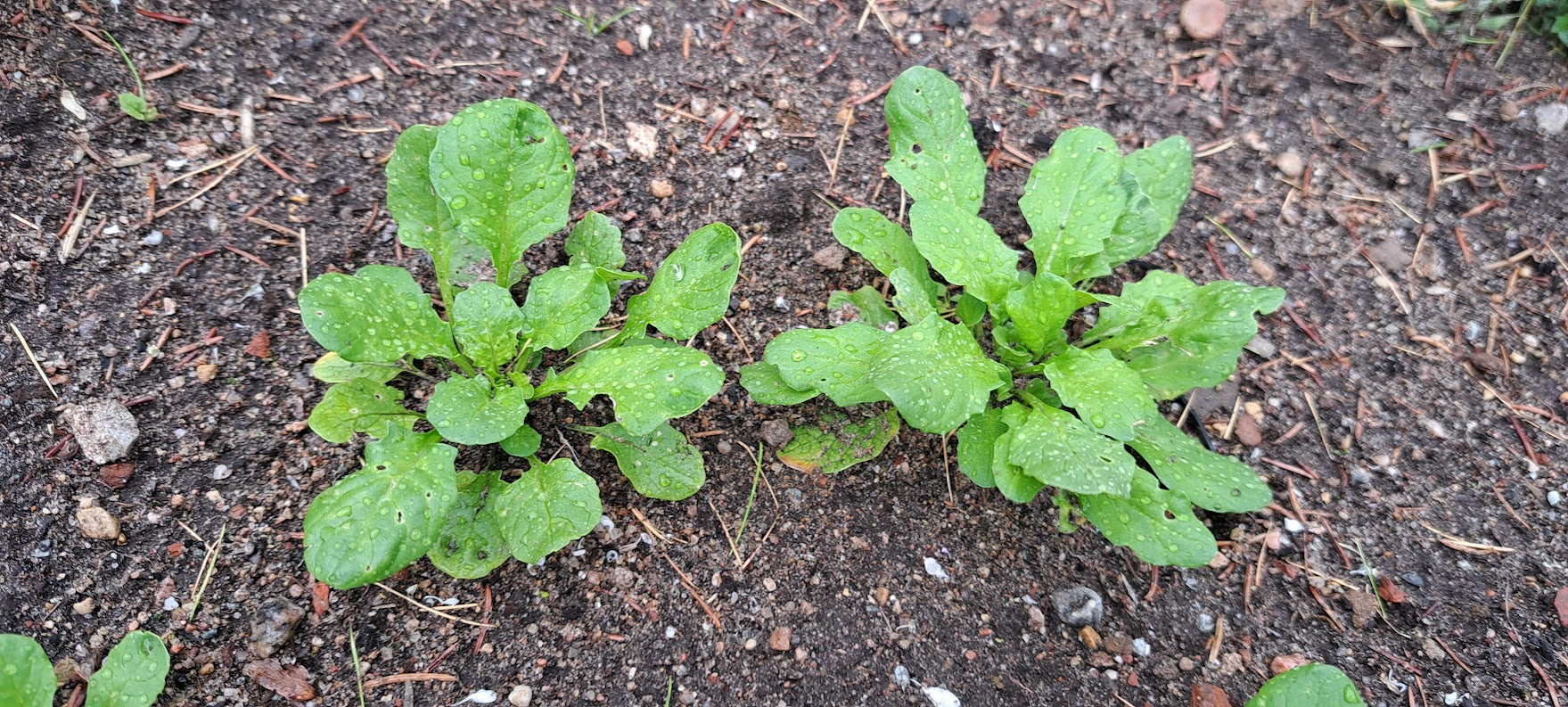

Scientific classification
- Kingdom: Plantae
- Clade: Tracheophytes
- Clade: Angiosperms
- Clade: Eudicots
- Clade: Rosids
- Order: Brassicales
- Family: Brassicaceae
- Genus: Mummenhoffia; Esmailbegi & Al-Shehbaz

= Mummenhoffia =

Genus of plants

Mummenhoffia is a genus of flowering plants belonging to the family Brassicaceae.

Its native range is Europe to Turkey, Ethiopia to Tanzania. It is found in Albania, Austria, Bulgaria, Ethiopia, France, Germany, Greece, Hungary, Italy, Kenya, Romania, Sicily, Spain, Tanzania, Turkey, Ukraine and Yugoslavia.

The genus name of Mummenhoffia is in honour of Klaus Mummenhoff (b.1956), a German botanist, specialist in Brassicaceae and Professor at the Osnabrück University.

The genus was circumscribed by Shokou Esmailbegi and Ihsan Ali Al-Shehbaz in Taxon vol.67 (Issue 2) on page 334 in 2018.

Species:

- Mummenhoffia alliacea (L.) Esmailbegi & Al-Shehbaz – southern and east-central Europe to northern Turkey
- Mummenhoffia oliveri (Engl.) Esmailbegi & Al-Shehbaz – mountains of tropical eastern Africa from Ethiopia to northern Tanzania
