= Samoa Field Airport =

Samoa Field Airport (formerly Eureka Municipal Airport)
- O33's location in California
- IATA: none; ICAO: none; FAA LID: O33

Summary
- Airport type: Public
- Owner: City of Eureka
- Serves: Eureka, California
- Elevation AMSL: 20 ft / 6 m
- Coordinates: 40°46′51″N 124°12′44″W

Map
- Interactive map of Samoa Field Airport (formerly Eureka Municipal Airport)

Runways
Direction	Length		Surface
Direction	ft	m	Surface
16/34	2,700	823	Asphalt

Statistics (2004)
- Aircraft operations: 5,000
- Based aircraft: 18
- Source: Federal Aviation Administration

Samoa Field Airport formerly Eureka Municipal Airport (FAA LID: O33) is a city-owned, public airport 2 miles (3.2 km) west of Eureka, on the northern peninsula of Humboldt Bay in Humboldt County, California, United States.

== Facilities ==
The airport covers 657 acres (266 ha) and is about 20 feet (6.1 m) above sea level. Its one runway, 16/34, is 2,700 by 60 feet (823 by 18 m) and is paved with asphalt.

Sixty percent of its flights are local and 40% are transient. In the year ending December 3, 2004 the airport had 5,000 aircraft operations, an average of 13 per day. Eighteen aircraft were then based at the airport: 89% single-engine and 11% ultralight.

15 city maintained hangars are available at the airport.

The airport is within walking distance (950 feet (290 m)) to the Pacific Ocean.

Humboldt Bay Social Club is located near the Airport and offers Bar and Restaurant, Vacation rentals, hotel suites and event spaces. No other services are at or near the airport.

== World War II ==
The field was built as a blimp and seaplane base during World War II called Eureka Auxiliary Field.

== Other local airports ==
- Arcata-Eureka Airport
- Kneeland Airport
- Murray Field
- Rohnerville Airport
