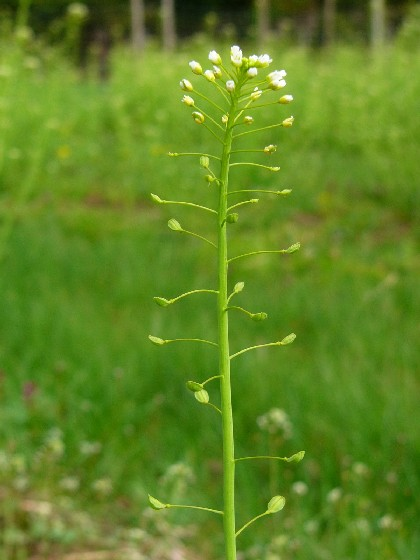
- Raceme
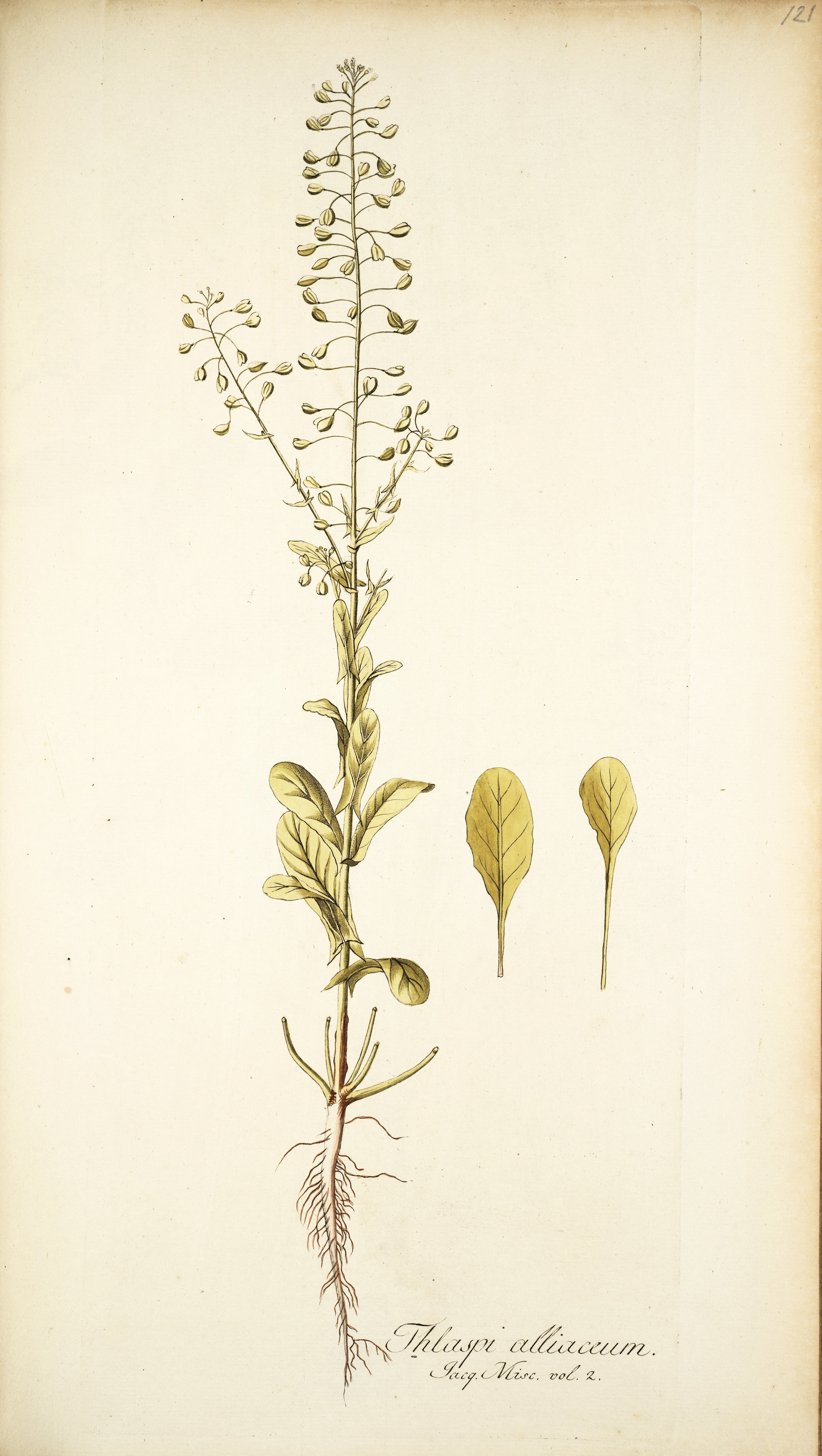
- Botanical illustration

Scientific classification
- Kingdom: Plantae
- Clade: Tracheophytes
- Clade: Angiosperms
- Clade: Eudicots
- Clade: Rosids
- Order: Brassicales
- Family: Brassicaceae
- Genus: Mummenhoffia
- Species: M. alliacea

Binomial name
- Mummenhoffia alliacea (L.) Esmailbegi & Al-Shehbaz

Synonyms
- Crucifera thlaspoides E.H.L.Krause; Myagrum sativum Aubry ex DC.; Thlaspi alliaceum L.

= Mummenhoffia alliacea =

Species of plant

Mummenhoffia alliacea (syn. Thlaspi alliaceum), the garlic pennycress or roadside pennycress, is a species of flowering plant in the family Brassicaceae. It is native to central and southern Europe, and Anatolia, and has been introduced to the United Kingdom and the eastern United States. An erect plant usually 25 to 65 cm (10 to 26 in) tall, it is typically found on roadsides, fields, and other disturbed situations.

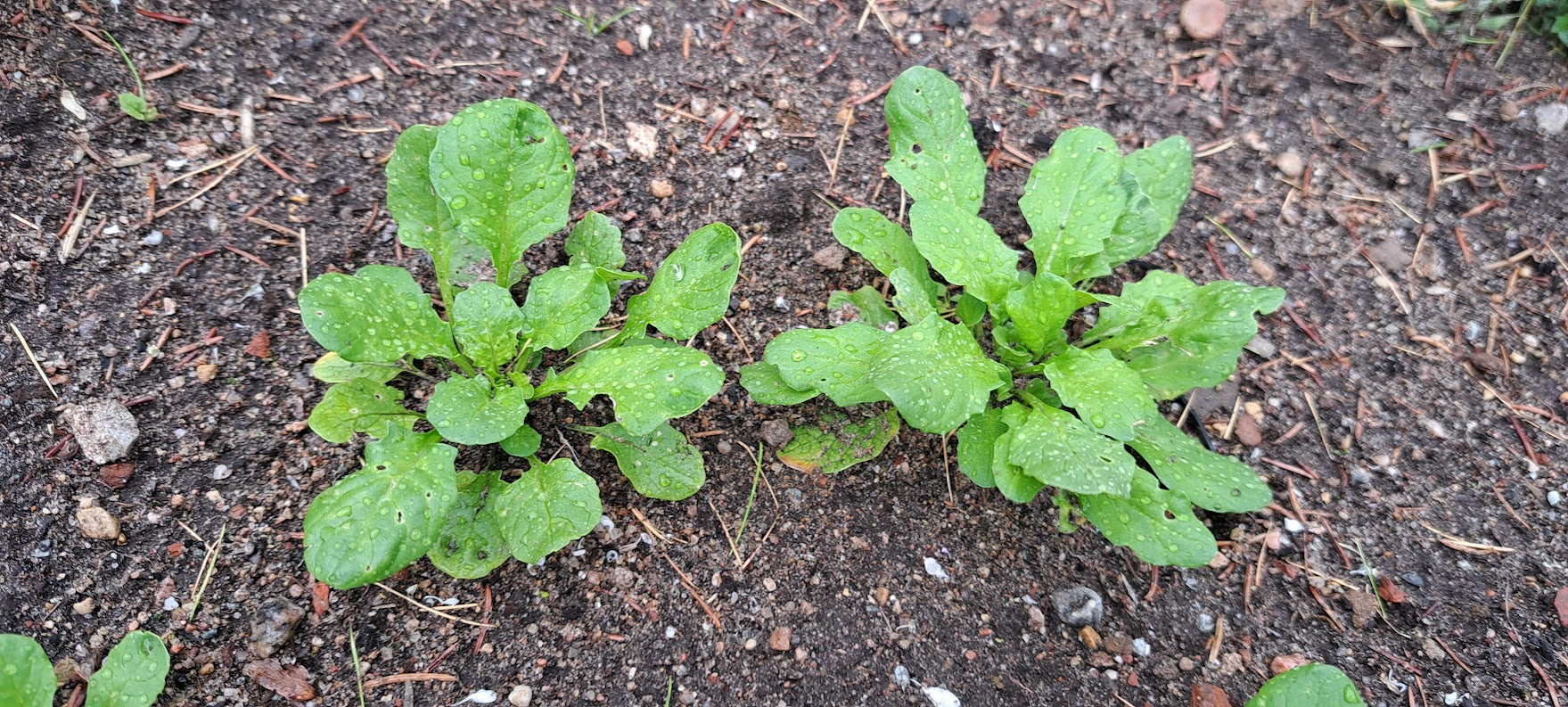
Seedlings

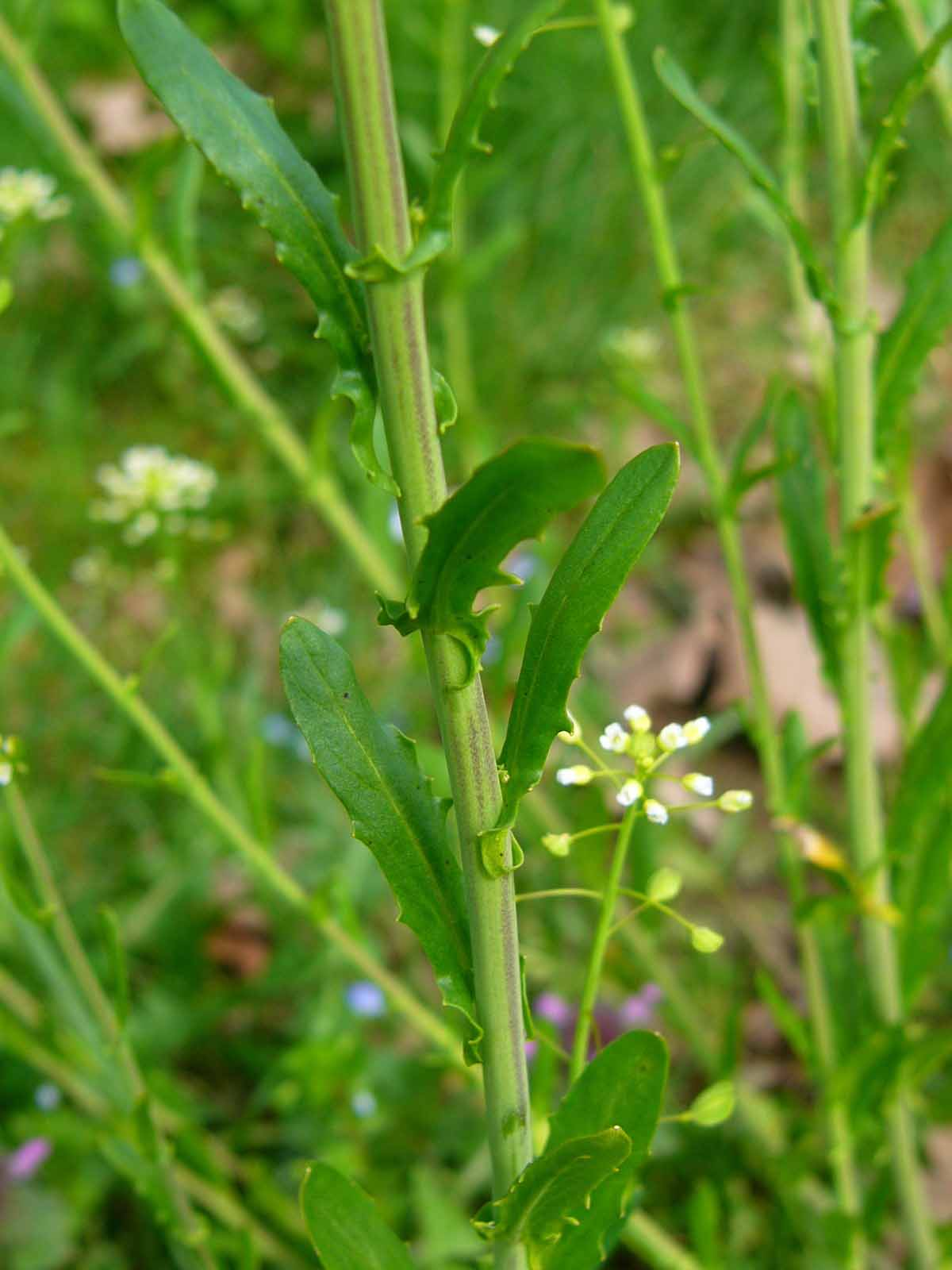
Stem and leaves

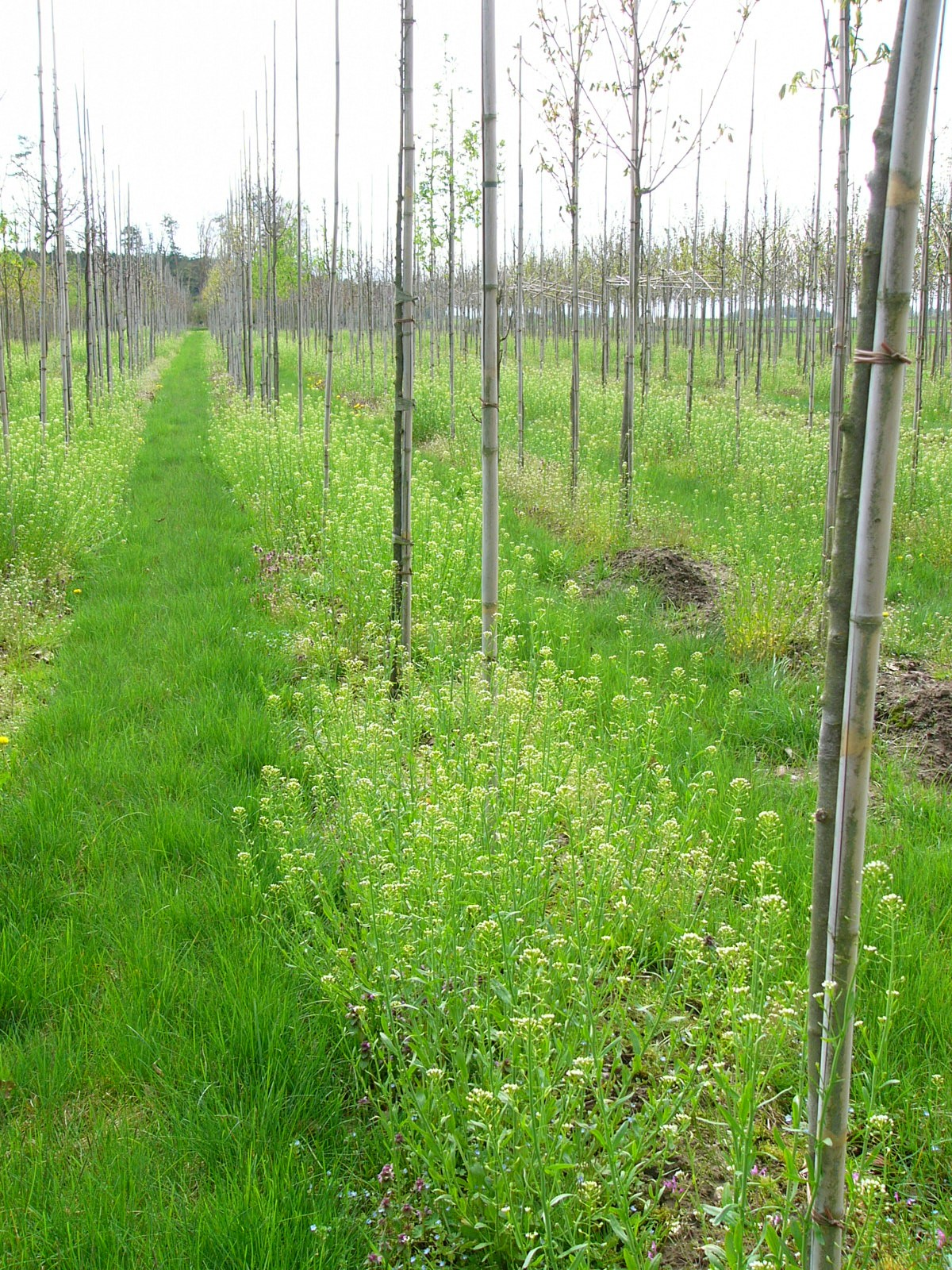
In a nursery
