= Arcata–Eureka Airport =

Regional airport in Humboldt County, California

California Redwood Coast – Humboldt County Airport

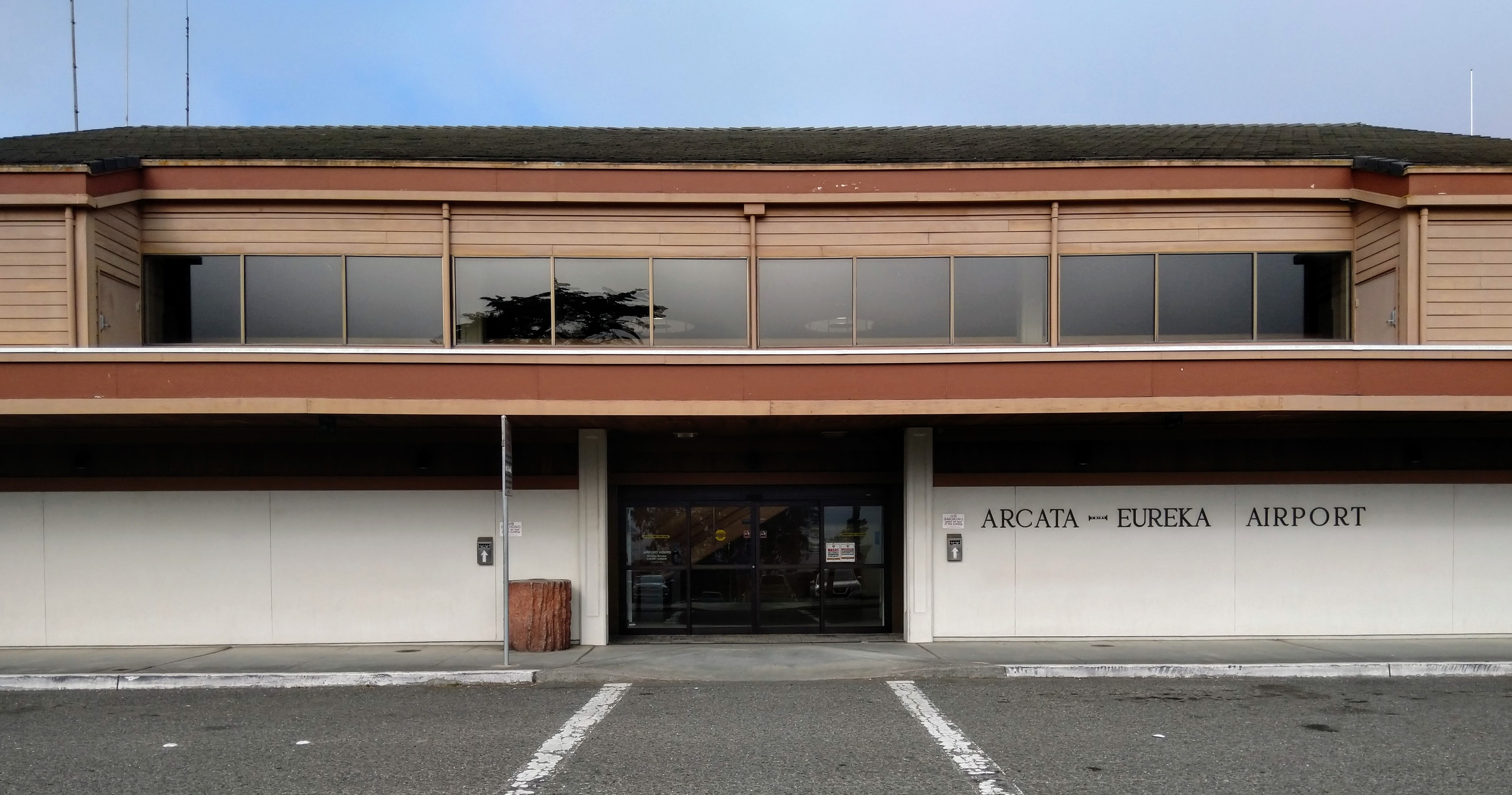
- IATA: ACV; ICAO: KACV; FAA LID: ACV

Summary
- Airport type: Public
- Owner: Humboldt County
- Operator: Humboldt County Department of Aviation
- Serves: Humboldt County, California
- Location: McKinleyville, California
- Elevation AMSL: 222 ft (68 m)
- Coordinates: 40°58′40″N 124°06′30″W
- Website: https://www.flyacv.com/

Maps
- FAA Airport Diagram
- Interactive map of California Redwood Coast – Humboldt County Airport

Runways
| Direction | Length | | Surface |
| Direction | ft | m | Surface |
|---|---|---|---|
| 14/32 | 6,046 | 1,843 | Asphalt |
| 01/19 | 4,501 | 1,372 | Asphalt |

Statistics (2025)
- Total Passengers: 268,000
- Based aircraft: 27
- Sources: FAA, Humboldt County

California Redwood Coast – Humboldt County Airport(IATA: ACV, ICAO: KACV, FAA LID: ACV), also known as Arcata–Eureka Airport and Arcata Airport, is in Humboldt County, California, United States, 8 miles (13 km) north of Arcata and 15 miles (24 km) north of Eureka, in McKinleyville.

The National Plan of Integrated Airport Systems for 2011–2015 categorized it as a Nonhub primary commercial service airport. The airport is a federally designated port of entry for civil aircraft arriving in the United States. The airport is the site of the command center for and primary facilities of the United States Coast Guard Air Station Humboldt Bay, which provides rescue and law enforcement for the region north of the San Francisco Bay Area.

== History ==
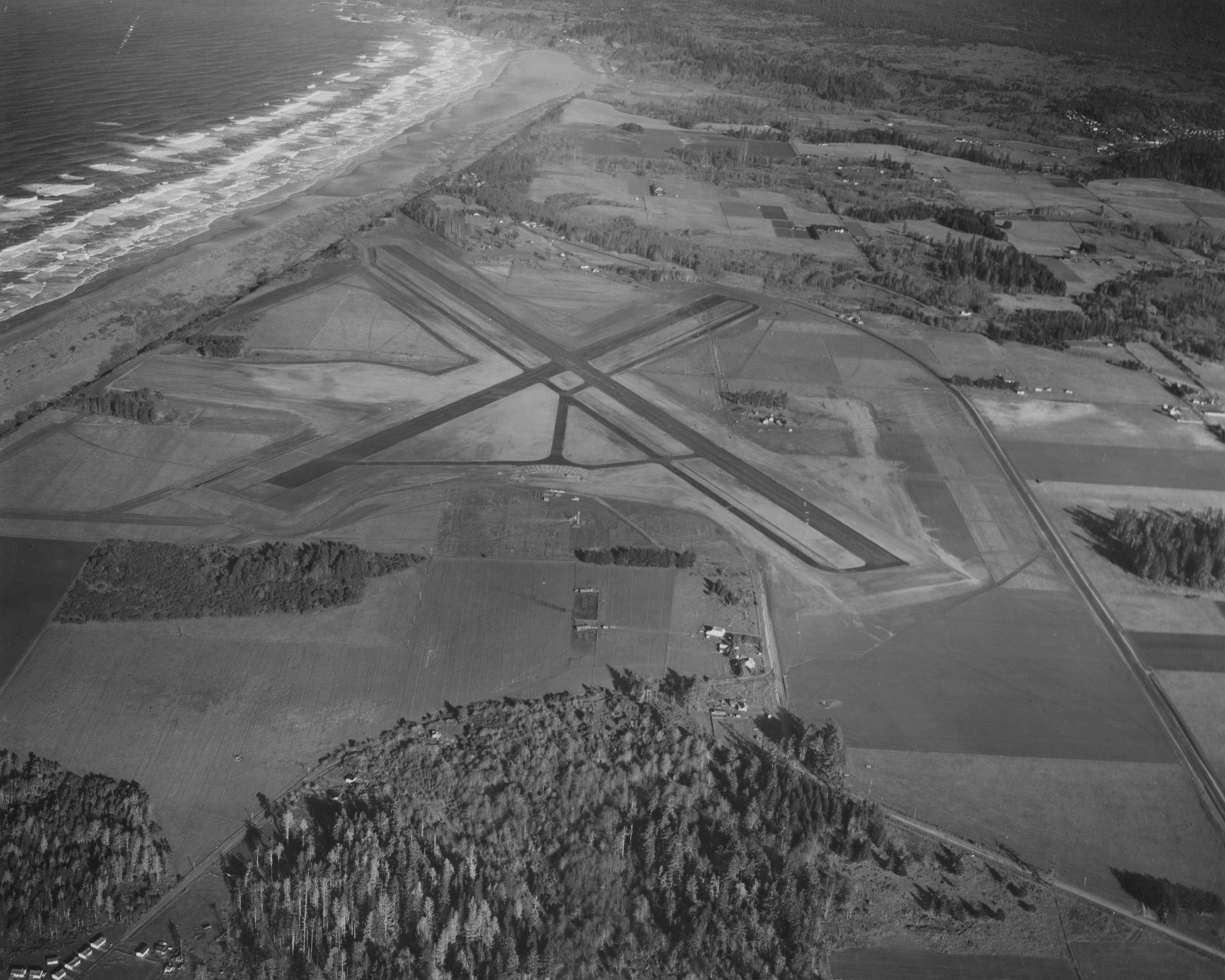
Arcata Naval Auxiliary Air Station December 25th, 1942

The airport was built by the United States Navy during World War II to test defogging systems. It operated in support of the Naval Air Station Alameda as the Arcata Naval Auxiliary Air Station (NAAS) and was headquarters for the Eureka section of naval local defense forces for the 12th Naval District.

In December 1947 a Southwest Airways Douglas DC-3 made the world's first blind landing by a scheduled commercial airliner using ground-controlled approach radar, instrument landing system and Fog Investigation and Dispersal Operation (FIDO) oil-burners next to the runway. By the following year the airline had made 1,200 routine instrument landings at the often fog-shrouded airport.

== Facilities ==
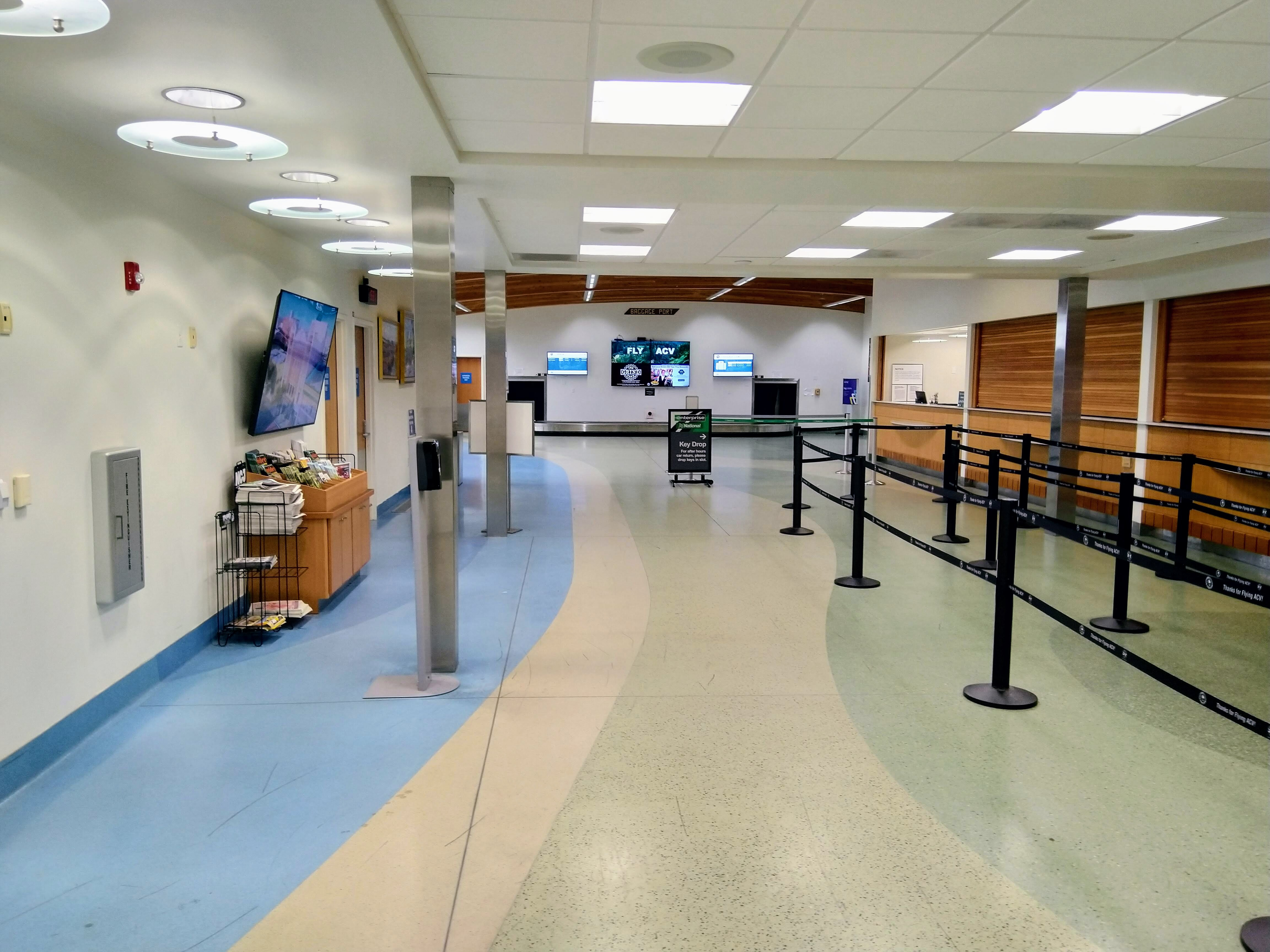
Arrivals area in the passenger terminal

The airport covers 745 acres (301 ha) at an elevation of 222 feet (68 m). It has two asphalt runways: 14/32 is 6,046 by 150 feet (1,843 by 46 m) and 01/19 is 4,501 by 150 feet (1,372 by 46 m).

The airport is under the jurisdiction of the California Coastal Commission and major changes to the airport such as rezoning or fencing require its approval.

The airport is the site for the US Coast Guard's Air Station-Sector Humboldt Bay. As a hub for general aviation, it provides 17 county-owned hangars, a large multi-purpose hangar and tiedown spaces for transient parking.

The approach path for runway 32 passes over Central Avenue. The glare of the strobe lights that direct planes to the runway were a hazard for drivers, especially during rain when the strobes' intensity increased and the road reflected the blinking lights. Baffles were installed on the strobes which block the lights from shining on the road while still guiding aircraft.

In the year ending May 31, 2019, the airport had 42,174 aircraft operations, averaging 116 per day: 61% military, 25% general aviation, and 14% airline. 24 aircraft at the time were based at the airport: 18 single-engine, 3 multi-engine, and 3 helicopters.

== Airlines and destinations ==
=== Passenger ===
| Airlines | Destinations |
|---|---|
| Alaska Airlines | Seattle/Tacoma |
| Breeze Airways | Burbank, Las Vegas |
| United Express | Denver, Los Angeles, San Francisco |

Destinations map
Destinations from Arcata–Eureka Airport
Red = Year-round destination
Green = Seasonal destination
Blue = Future destination

=== Cargo ===
| Airlines | Destinations |
|---|---|
| FedEx Feeder | Sacramento |

== Statistics ==
=== Top destinations ===
Busiest routes from ACV (February 2025 – January 2026)
| Rank | City | Passengers | Airline |
|---|---|---|---|
| 1 | San Francisco, California | 71,340 | United |
| 2 | Denver, Colorado | 23,930 | United |
| 3 | Los Angeles, California | 21,010 | United |
| 4 | Burbank, California | 17,750 | Avelo |

=== Airline market share ===
Largest airlines at ACV (February 2025 – January 2026)
| Rank | Airline | Passengers | Share |
|---|---|---|---|
| 1 | SkyWest Airlines | 231,000 | 86.70% |
| 2 | Avelo Airlines | 35,350 | 13.30% |

=== Annual traffic ===
| Year | Passengers |
|---|---|
| 2002 | 64,000 |
| 2003 | 180,000 |
| 2004 | 191,000 |
| 2005 | 215,000 |
| 2006 | 206,000 |
| 2007 | 210,000 |
| 2008 | 211,000 |
| 2009 | 204,000 |
| 2010 | 184,000 |
| 2011 | 139,000 |
| 2012 | 120,000 |
| 2013 | 112,000 |
| 2014 | 103,000 |
| 2015 | 108,000 |
| 2016 | 138,000 |
| 2017 | 130,000 |
| 2018 | 137,000 |
| 2019 | 169,000 |
| 2020 | 76,000 |
| 2021 | 187,000 |
| 2022 | 238,000 |
| 2023 | 234,000 |
| 2024 | 265,000 |
| 2025 | 268,000 |

== Current airline service ==
Scheduled flights are operated by SkyWest Airlines flying as United Express on a code sharing basis on behalf of United Airlines with three or four nonstop flights per day to San Francisco SFO on Canadair CRJ-200 and Embraer 175 regional jets as well one nonstop flight per day to both Los Angeles LAX and Denver International Airport.

Daily nonstop service to Denver International Airport (DEN) began on June 7, 2019.

Service increased significantly since 2015, with new destinations (LAX, DEN, BUR, and LAS) and passenger departures have increased 56%.

On May 19, 2021, new nonstop scheduled passenger service to Hollywood Burbank Airport (BUR) operated by Avelo Airlines was launched with Boeing 737-800 mainline jetliners, the largest aircraft type serving the airport at the time. Avelo added service to Las Vegas Harry Reid International Airport in November 2021. The service ended on May 2, 2022, resumed on September 8, 2023, and ended again January 8, 2024. Service was again restarted; however, it ended on October 20, 2025. Avelo does not serve Arcata at all as of April 2026.

On July 17, 2025, Breeze Airways announced it would establish service to BUR on March 26, 2026, with a connecting no plane change flight to Provo/Salt Lake City. On November 4, 2025, Breeze Airways announced they would establish service to Las Vegas, the other destination Avelo once offered.

In August 2022, Alaska Airlines announced a possible reintroduction of service to Seattle Tacoma International Airport or Portland International Airport. On October 20, 2022, the airline cited a potential delay due to the ongoing pilot shortage. On October 24, 2025, Alaska Airlines announced they would be reintroducing service to Seattle on April 8, 2026 which was confirmed by Humboldt County.

== Past airline service ==
ACV was previously served by several airlines.

- Eureka Aero (mid-1970s) (Eureka; Crescent City, California)
- Air Oregon (early 1980s) (San Francisco; Sacramento, California; Portland, Oregon; Medford, Oregon; Eugene, Oregon; North Bend, Oregon)
- American Eagle (San Jose, California)
- Pacific Air Lines and predecessor Southwest Airways (San Francisco)
- Pacific Southwest Airlines (PSA) (San Francisco)
- Horizon Air (from 1994 to 2011) (Redding, California; Portland, Los Angeles and briefly Seattle, Washington)
- Delta Connection (2008–2010) operated by SkyWest Airlines (Salt Lake City, Utah)
- Hughes Airwest and predecessor Air West (Crescent City, Medford, San Francisco, Eugene, Los Angeles, Portland and Seattle)
- Republic Airlines (1979–1986) (San Francisco and other destinations)
- United Airlines (San Francisco)
- WestAir operating as United Express (San Francisco)
- Arcata Flying Service (early 1980s) (Redding, Portland, and Oakland, California).
- In 2016 and part of 2017, PenAir offered service to Portland International (PDX) and Redding, California (RDD) with 30 passenger Saab 340Bs.
- American Airlines started flights to Phoenix Sky Harbor International Airport on June 3, 2021, but ended them on August 15, 2022.
- Aha Airlines started flights to Reno-Tahoe International Airport on November 11, 2021, but ended on March 30, 2022.

== Past jet service ==
- Pacific Air Lines flew Boeing 727-100s nonstop to San Francisco and direct to Burbank.
- Pacific Southwest Airlines (PSA) flew BAe 146-200s nonstop to San Francisco and direct to Los Angeles.
- WestAir (operating code sharing service as United Express on behalf of United Airlines) flew BAe 146-200s nonstop to San Francisco.
- United Airlines flew Boeing 737-200s to San Francisco.
- SkyWest (operating code sharing service as the Delta Connection on behalf of Delta Air Lines) flew Canadair CRJ-200s to Salt Lake City.
- Hughes Airwest (previously Air West) flew Douglas DC-9-10s and McDonnell Douglas DC-9-30s nonstop to San Francisco and direct to Los Angeles; Phoenix, Arizona; Tucson, Arizona; Portland; and Seattle. At one point, Hughes Airwest DC-9s flew direct, no change of plane DC-9 service to Mazatlán, Mexico and Guadalajara, Mexico via San Francisco, Los Angeles and Tucson. Predecessor Air West operated Boeing 727-100s, Douglas DC-9-10s and McDonnell Douglas DC-9-30s nonstop to San Francisco.
- Republic Airlines, which was the successor to Hughes Airwest, operated McDonnell Douglas DC-9-30s nonstop to San Francisco with direct, no change of plane DC-9 service to Los Angeles, Las Vegas, Phoenix, Tucson, Memphis, Tennessee, and Tampa, Florida during the early 1980s.

The first jets scheduled to ACV were Pacific Air Lines Boeing 727-100s in 1967; Pacific also served ACV with Fairchild F-27 turboprops.

== Ground transportation ==
- The U.S. Route 101 freeway is accessible to the airport via the Arcata Airport exit.
- Redwood Transit System
- Door-to-door airport shuttle service, taxis, and rental cars can be arranged at the airport.

== Other local airports ==
- Eureka Municipal Airport
- Kneeland Airport
- Murray Field
- Rohnerville Airport
