= Noccaea cypria =

Scientific classification
- Kingdom: Plantae
- Clade: Tracheophytes
- Clade: Angiosperms
- Clade: Eudicots
- Clade: Rosids
- Order: Brassicales
- Family: Brassicaceae
- Genus: Noccaea
- Species: N. cypria

Binomial name
- Noccaea cypria (Bornm.) F.K.Mey.

Synonyms
- Thlaspi cyprium Bornm.

Species of flowering plant

Noccaea cypria, the Cyprus penny-cress, is a perennial herb, flowering from February to May. This herb is a nickel hyperaccumulator with a recorded accumulation rate of 52,120 mg/kg of dry weight.

== Habitat ==
Moist rocky slopes and near streams on igneous rocks at 900–1900 metres elevation.

== Distribution ==
Endemic to Cyprus, very common in the Troödos forest, but occurs in other areas as well: Khionistra, Prodromos, Kryos Potamos, Almyrolivadho, Pashia Livadhi, Papoutsa, Saranti, Lagoudhera, Platania, Kionia.
