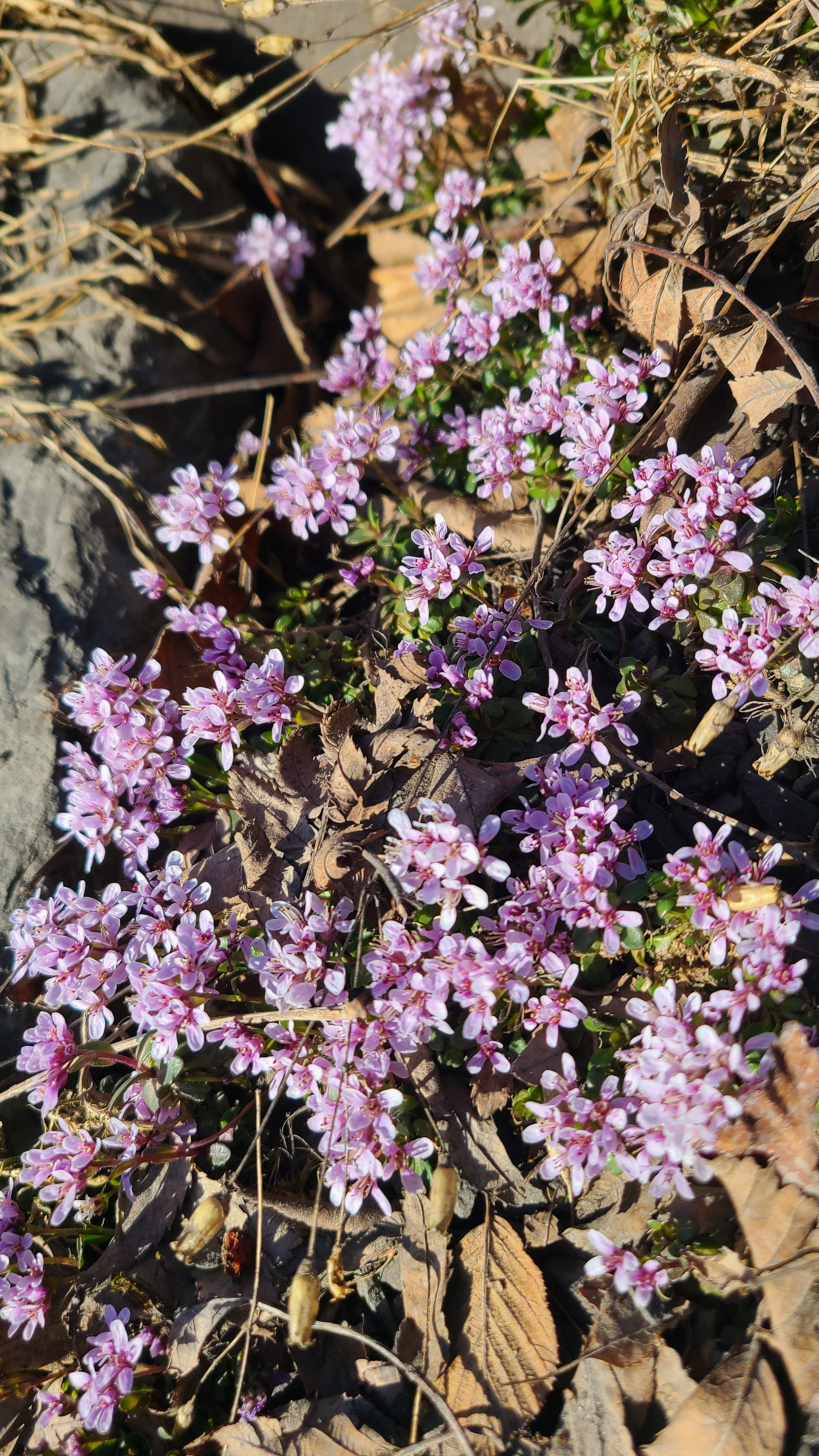

Scientific classification
- Kingdom: Plantae
- Clade: Tracheophytes
- Clade: Angiosperms
- Clade: Eudicots
- Clade: Rosids
- Order: Brassicales
- Family: Brassicaceae
- Genus: Noccaea
- Species: N. rotundifolia

Binomial name
- Noccaea rotundifolia (L.) Moench

Synonyms
- Synonymy: Crucifera rotundifolia E.H.L.Krause; Hutchinsia rotundifolia (L.) W.T.Aiton; Iberidella rotundifolia (L.) Hook.f.; Iberis rotundifolia L. (1753) (basionym); Iberis repens Lam.; Lepidium rotundifolium (L.) All.; Noccaea rotundifolia subsp. intermedia F.K.Mey.; Thlaspi cepaeifolium subsp. rotundifolium (L.) Greuter & Burdet; Thlaspi limosellifolium Reut. ex Rouy & Foucaud; Thlaspi repens Maire; Thlaspi rotundifolium (L.) Gaudin; Thlaspi rotundifolium f. albiflorum (Bolzon) Bolzon; Thlaspi rotundifolium subf. albiflorum Bolzon; Thlaspi rotundifolium var. oligospermum Gaudin

= Noccaea rotundifolia =

Species of flowering plant in the mustard family

Noccaea rotundifolia is a hardy perennial flowering plant in the family Brassicaceae. It is a subshrub native to the Alps, ranging from eastern France to Slovenia. It is capable surviving in alpine conditions. It has been sold for cultivation in rock gardens.

== Description ==
The plant has a basal rosette out of which grows one or several short, unbranched stems that have small, rounded leaves and end in dense racemes of small pink flowers.
