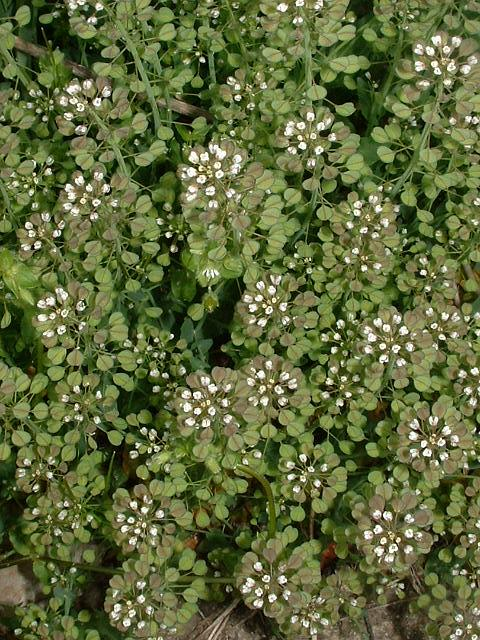

Scientific classification
- Kingdom: Plantae
- Clade: Tracheophytes
- Clade: Angiosperms
- Clade: Eudicots
- Clade: Rosids
- Order: Brassicales
- Family: Brassicaceae
- Genus: Noccaea
- Species: N. perfoliata

Binomial name
- Noccaea perfoliata (L.) Al-Shehbaz

Synonyms
- Synonymy: Crucifera perfoliata (L.) E.H.L.Krause; Kandis perfoliata (L.) Kerguélen; Microthlaspi perfoliatum (L.) F.K.Mey.; Pterotropis impropera (Jord.) Fourr.; Pterotropis martialis (Jord.) Fourr.; Thlaspi finitimum Dvořáková; Thlaspi improperum Jord.; Thlaspi inornatum Schott; Thlaspi martiale Jord.; Thlaspi micranthum Boiss. & C.I.Blanche; Thlaspi neglectum Crép.; Thlaspi perfoliatum L. (1753) (basionym); Thlaspi perfoliatum subsp. improperum (Jord.) P.Fourn.; Thlaspi perfoliatum proles improperum (Jord.) Rouy & Foucaud; Thlaspi perfoliatum var. macrophyllum Willk.; Thlaspi perfoliatum var. microcarpum Boiss.; Thlaspi perfoliatum subsp. neglectum (Crép.) Nyman; Thlaspi perfoliatum var. neglectum (Crép.) T.Durand ex Thell.; Thlaspi perfoliatum f. praecox Bolzon; Thlaspi perfoliatum var. rotundatum Boiss.; Thlaspi perfoliatum var. simplicissimum DC.; Thlaspi perfoliatum var. stylatum Post; Thlaspi posteriflorum Jord.; Thlaspi pratulorum Gand.; Thlaspi revellieri Boreau; Thlaspi tineanum A.Huet ex Ball; Thlaspidium cordatum Bubani

= Noccaea perfoliata =

Species of plant

Noccaea perfoliata is a species of flowering plant in the family Brassicaceae. It is an annual native to southern, central, and southeastern Europe, North Africa, and western and central Asia from the eastern Mediterranean to the Altai, Xinjiang, and Pakistan.

== Sources ==
This article incorporates text from a free content work. Licensed under CC0 (license statement/permission). Text taken from Thlaspi perfoliatum. Encyclopedia of Life.
