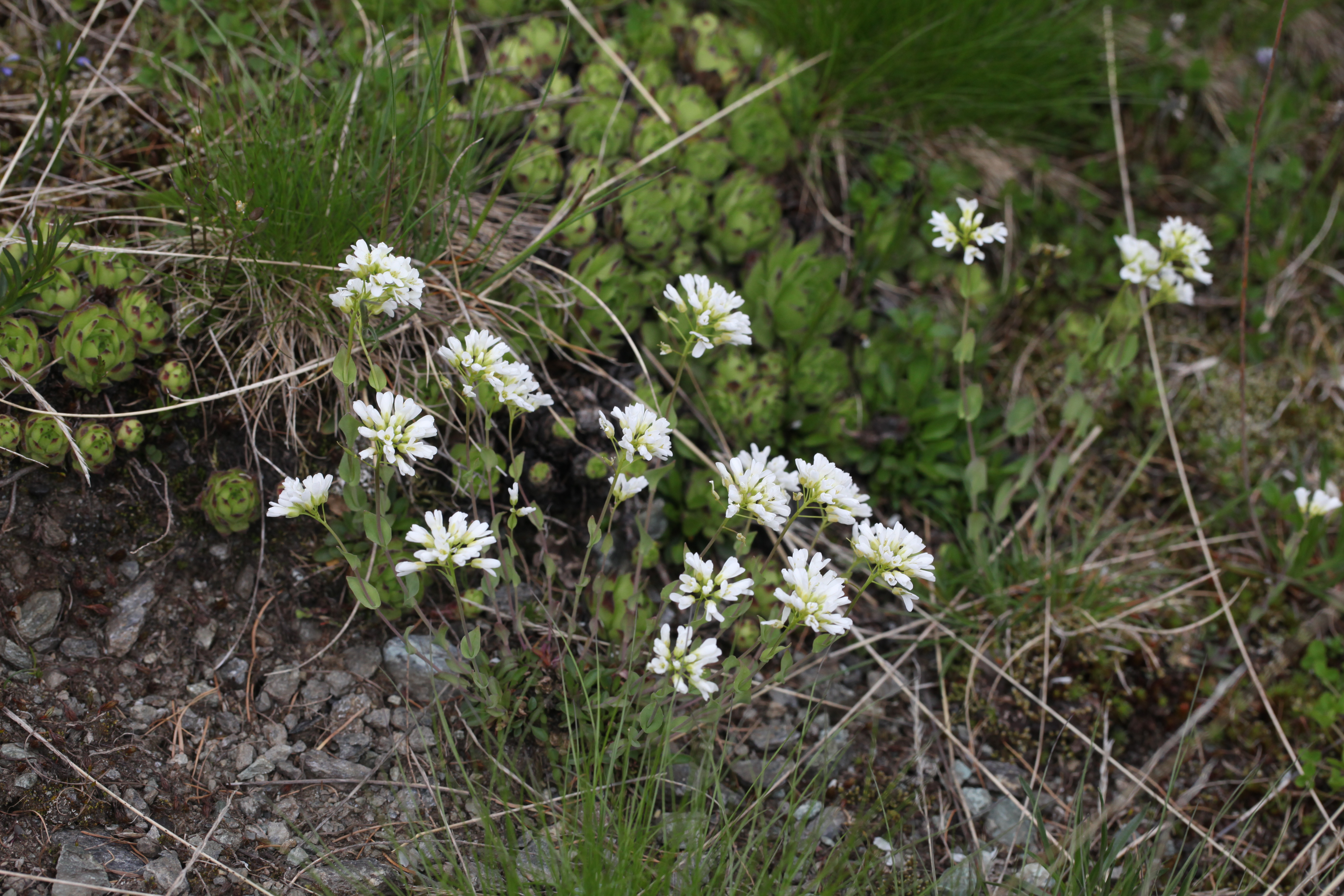

Scientific classification
- Kingdom: Plantae
- Clade: Tracheophytes
- Clade: Angiosperms
- Clade: Eudicots
- Clade: Rosids
- Order: Brassicales
- Family: Brassicaceae
- Genus: Noccaea
- Species: N. alpestris

Binomial name
- Noccaea alpestris (Jacq.) Kerguélen

Synonyms
- List: Thlaspi alpestre Jacq.; Noccaea crantzii F.K.Mey.; Thlaspi alpinum (Crantz) Crantz; Thlaspi montanum subsp. alpinum (Crantz) Bonnier & Layens; Thlaspi montanum var. alpinum Crantz; Thlaspi subapterum Freyn

= Noccaea alpestris =

Species of flowering plant

Noccaea alpestris is a species of flowering plant belonging to the family Brassicaceae.
