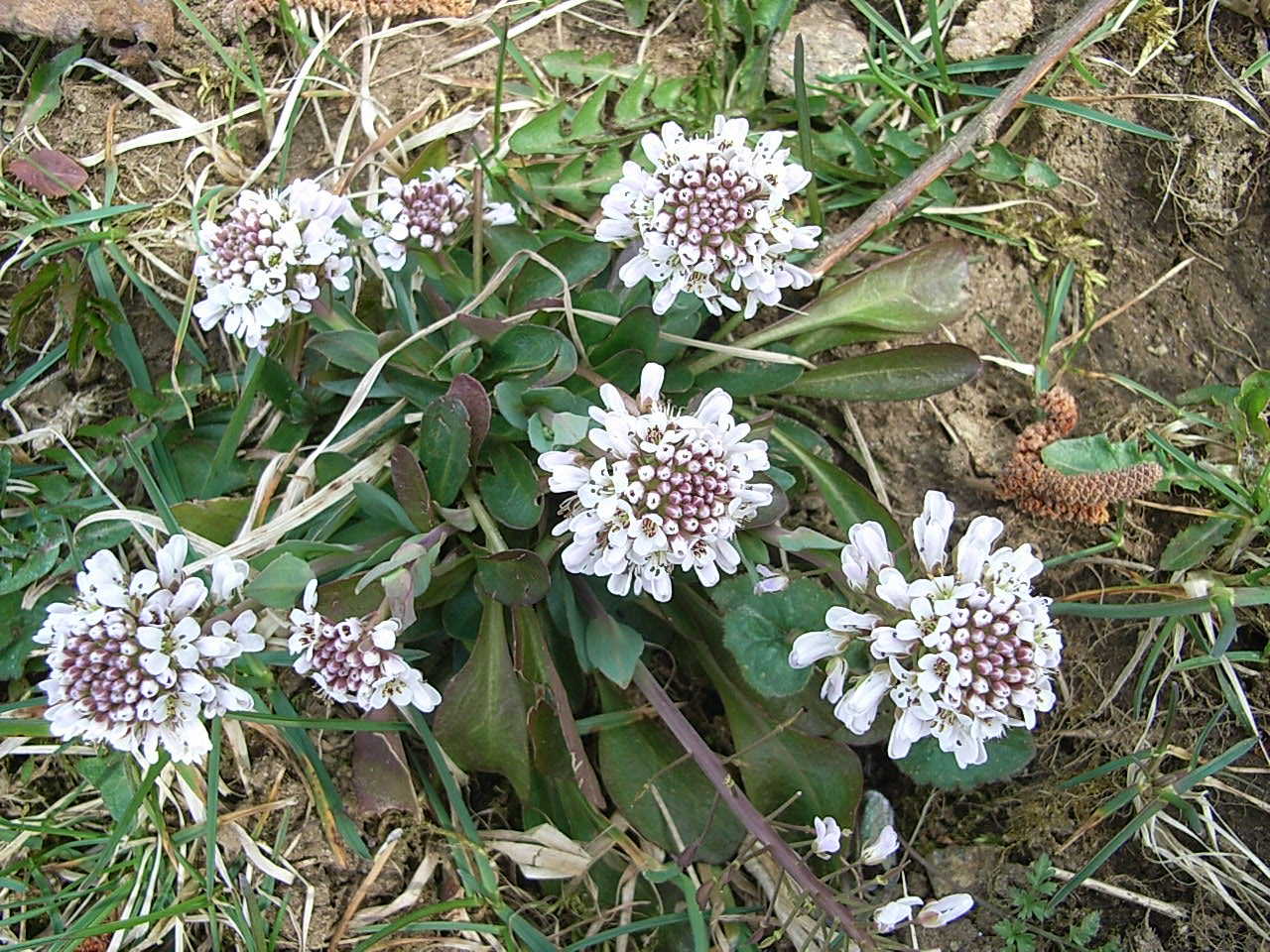

Scientific classification
- Kingdom: Plantae
- Clade: Tracheophytes
- Clade: Angiosperms
- Clade: Eudicots
- Clade: Rosids
- Order: Brassicales
- Family: Brassicaceae
- Genus: Noccaea
- Species: N. caerulescens

Binomial name
- Noccaea caerulescens (J.Presl & C.Presl) F.K.Mey.

Synonyms
- List: Thlaspi alpestre (L.) L.; Thlaspi alpestre Vill.; Thlaspi alpestre var. tunense C.G.Westerl.; Thlaspi caerulescens J.Presl & C.Presl; Crucifera coerulescens (J.Presl & C.Presl) E.H.L.Krause; Noccaea occitanica (J.Presl & C.Presl) F.K.Mey.; Noccaea brachypetala (Jord.) F.K.Mey.; Thlaspi alpestre subsp. brachypetalum (Jord.); Thlaspi brachypetalum Jord.; Noccaea salisii (Brügger) F.K.Mey.; Pterotropis lereschii Fourr.; Thlaspi arnaudiae Jord. ex Boreau; Thlaspi brachypetalum subsp. salisii (Brügger) O.Schwarz; Thlaspi brachypetalum proles salticola (Jord.) Rouy & Foucaud; Thlaspi brachypetalum proles verlotii (Jord.) Rouy & Foucaud; Thlaspi nemoricola Jord.; Thlaspi perfoliatum subsp. virgatum (Godr.) Bonnier & Layens; Thlaspi rhaeticum Jord.; Thlaspi salisii Brügger; Thlaspi salticola Jord.; Thlaspi suecicum Jord.; Thlaspi sylvestre proles arnaudiae (Jord. ex Boreau) Rouy & Foucaud; Thlaspi verlotii Jord.; Thlaspi virgatum Godr.; Thlaspi vulcanorum Lamotte

= Noccaea caerulescens =

Species of plant

Noccaea caerulescens (previously Thlaspi caerulescens), the alpine penny-cress or alpine pennygrass, is a flowering plant in the family Brassicaceae. It is found in Scandinavia and Europe.

== Description ==
Noccaea caerulescens is a low biennial or perennial plant that has small basal rosettes of stalked elliptic–lanceolate leaves with entire margins. The one or more flowering stems have small stalkless, alternate leaves clasping the stem. The inflorescence is a dense raceme which continues to lengthen after flowering. The individual flowers are regular, with white or pinkish petals and are about 5 mm (0.2 in) wide. Each has four sepals, four petals, six stamens (four long and two short) with violet anthers, and a single carpel. The fruit is many-seeded and narrowly spatulate and has a notched tip. This plant flowers in late spring.

== Distribution and habitat ==
In Europe it is found in Finland and Sweden, in all but the most northerly regions. It is also found in the Alps, the Massif Central, the Pyrenees, eastern Norway, southern Germany, and northern England. It is a plant of dry hillside meadows, forest margins, banks, gardens, lawns, pastures, field margins, yards and bare places.

== Phytoremediation ==
Alpine pennycress has been cited in phytoremediation to have special phytoextractional properties and is known to absorb cadmium with very good results and in certain instances is said to have absorbed zinc as well. Leaves accumulate up to 380 mg/kg Cd. Its ability to accumulate zinc can be inhibited by high concentrations of other metals in the growth medium, such as copper.[7] [D.J. Walker, M.P. Bernal (2004) Water, Air, & Soil Pollution 151(1-4): 361-372]
