= Murray Field =

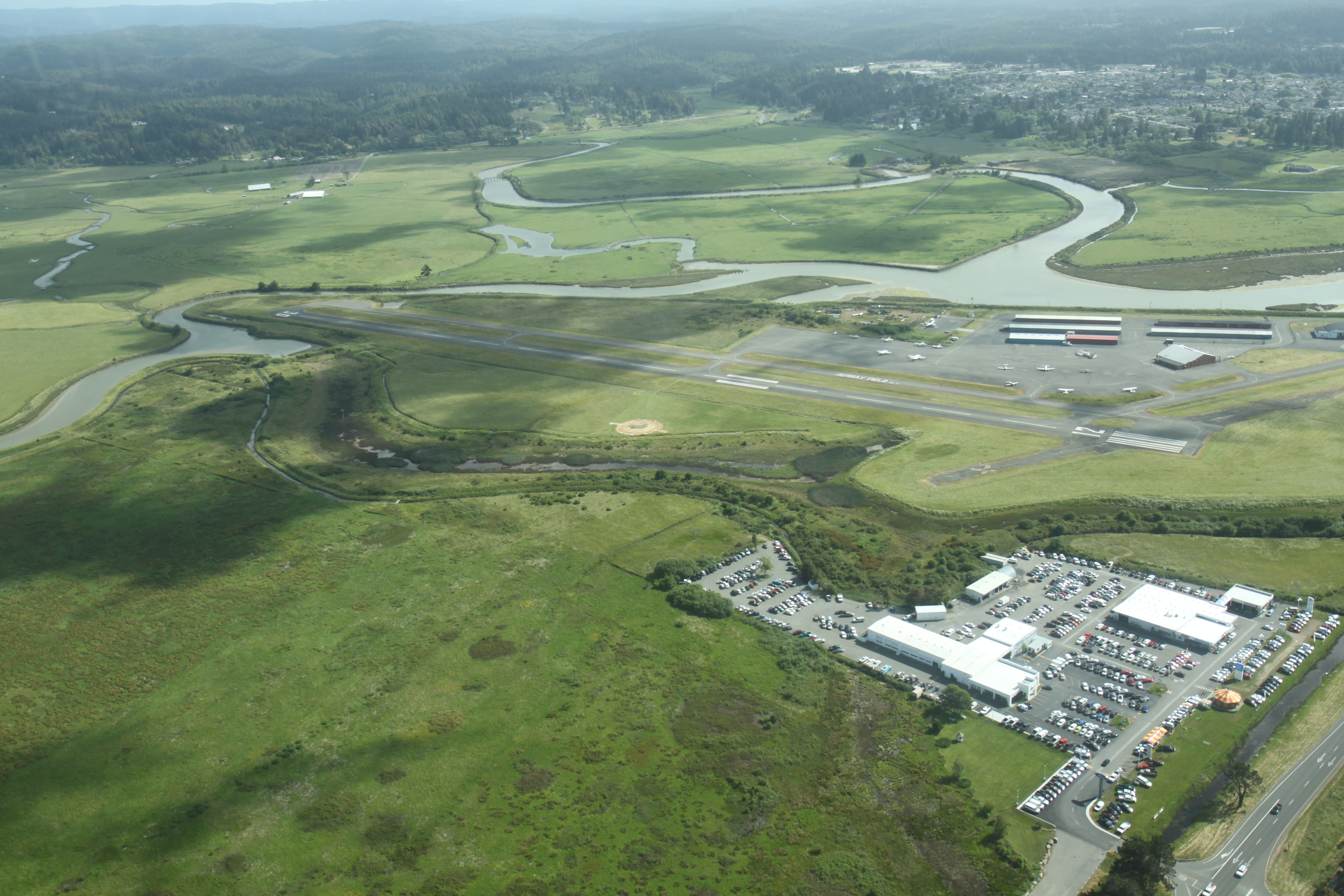
- IATA: EKA; ICAO: KEKA; FAA LID: EKA

Summary
- Airport type: Public
- Owner: Humboldt County
- Location: Eureka, California
- Elevation AMSL: 7 ft / 2 m
- Coordinates: 40°48′12″N 124°06′46″W

Map
- Interactive map of Murray Field

Runways
Direction	Length		Surface
Direction	ft	m	Surface
12/30	3,000	914	Asphalt

Statistics (2007)
- Aircraft operations: 65,450
- Based aircraft: 59
- Source: Federal Aviation Administration

Murray Field (IATA: EKA, ICAO: KEKA, FAA LID: EKA) is a county-owned public airport, located adjacent to Humboldt Bay within Eureka, California in Humboldt County. Most of its use is general aviation, but UPS flights stop for package delivery.

== History ==
Murray Field was established in 1919 by pilot Dayton Murray, Senior, and was later named for him after the county acquired the field in the 1930s. The airport is built on filled land. In 1976, the airport had scheduled passenger airline service operated by Eureka Aero Industries, a commuter air carrier that operated Cessna 402 twin prop aircraft.

== Facilities and aircraft ==
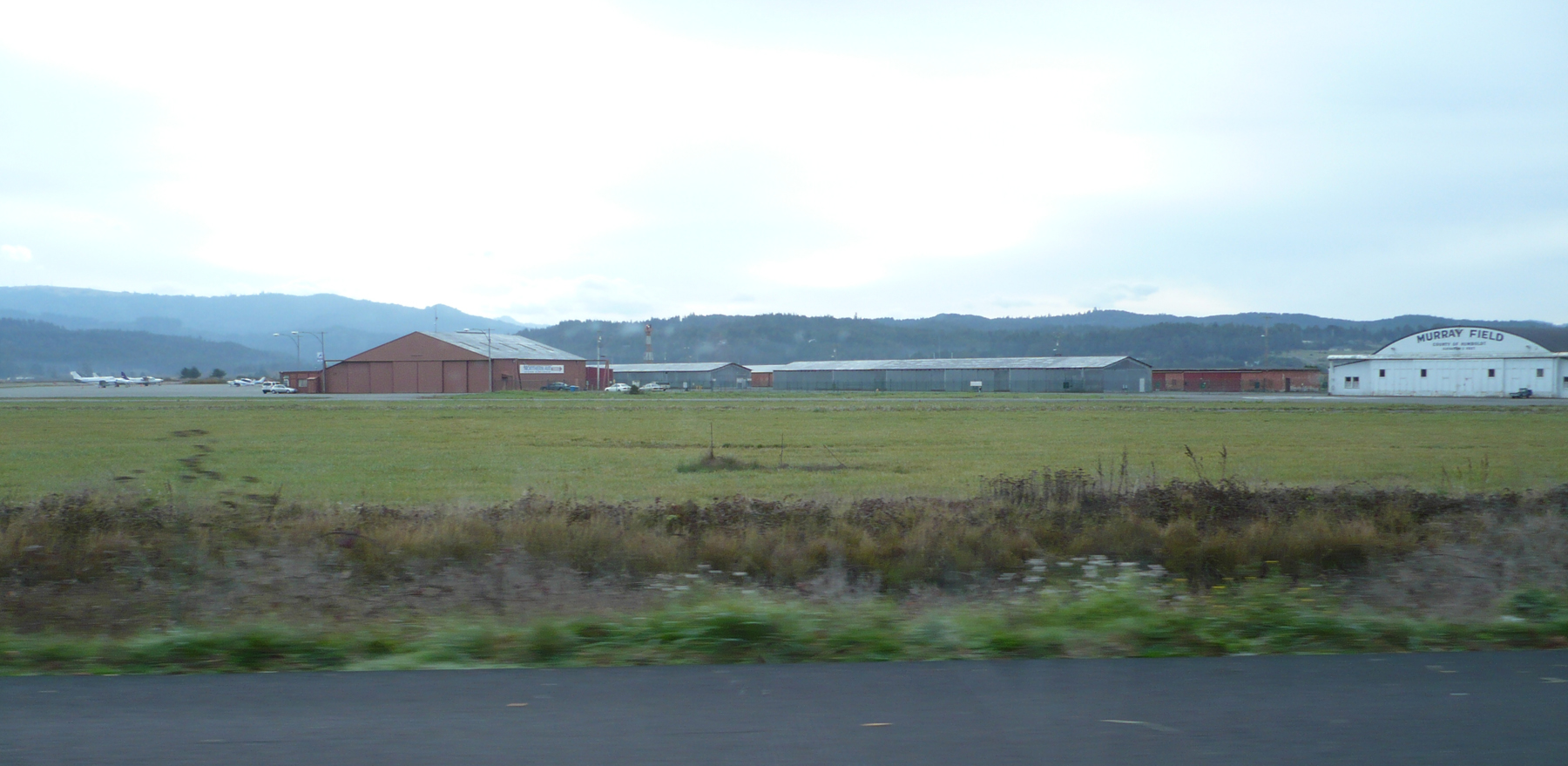
Murray Field view from US 101

Murray Field covers 131 acres (53 ha) at 7 feet (2.1 m) above mean sea level on reclaimed land east of Humboldt Bay. Its one runway, 12/30, is 3,011 by 75 feet (918 by 23 m) asphalt. Medium Intensity Runway Lights (MIRL) are the only airport lighting. Runways 12 and 30 have Visual Approach Slope Indicators (VASI) and a parallel taxi-way. The original runway 7-25 was shut down as substandard in 1997.

It has aircraft engine and airframe repair service, as well as a Civil Air Patrol office which is not currently being used. United Postal Service and Federal Express Cessna Caravan aircraft used the airfield. Piston engine aircraft fuel is not available but work to make it available is underway. Local fixed wing air ambulance providers also use the airfield. There was once a restaurant, but it has closed permanently.

In 2007 the airport had 65,450 aircraft operations, average 179 per day: 99% general aviation, <1% air taxi and <1% military. In 2005 101 aircraft were based at the airport: 90 single-engine, 11 multi-engine.

== Other local airports ==
- Arcata-Eureka Airport
- Eureka Municipal Airport
- Kneeland Airport
