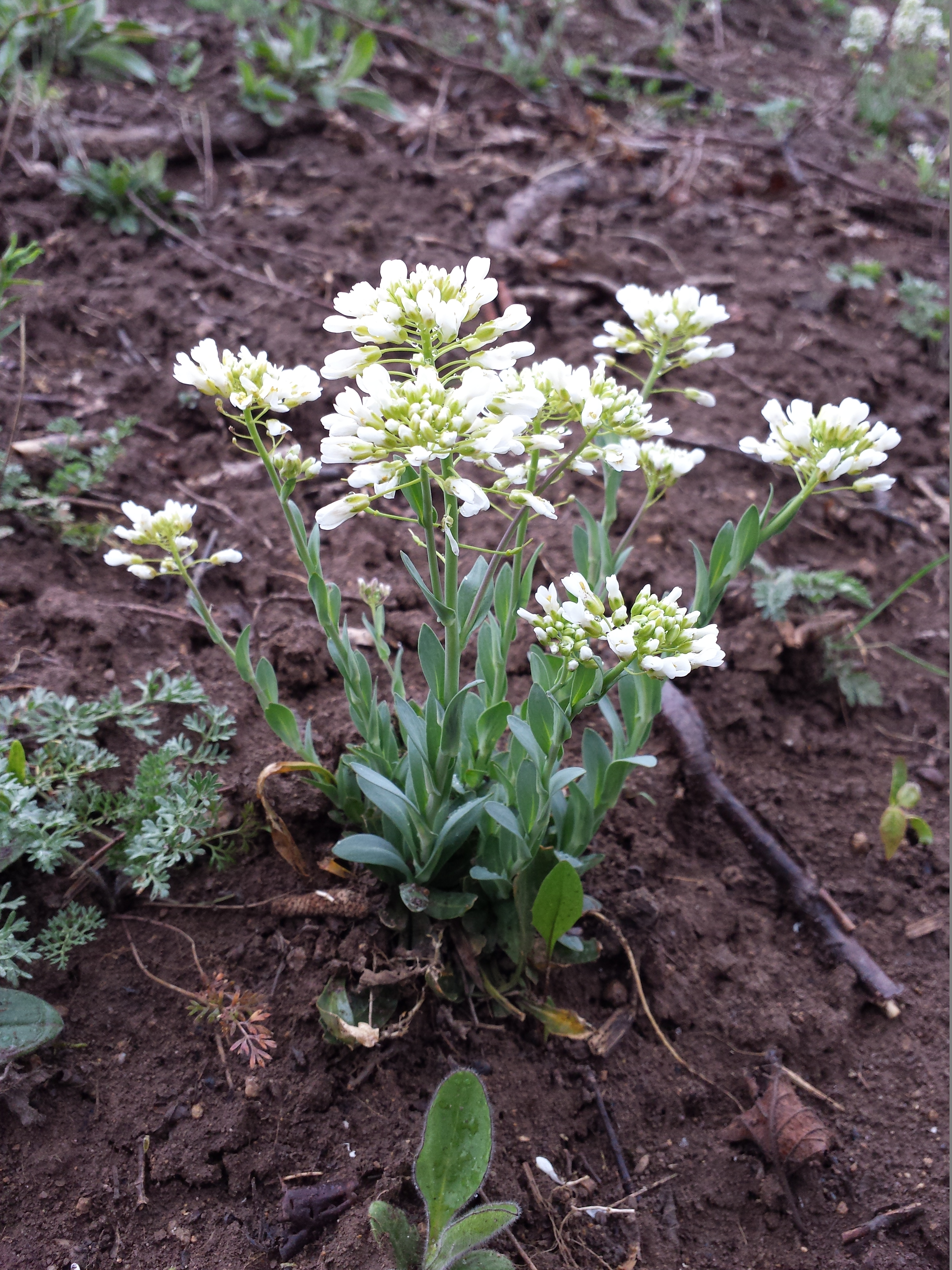
- Noccaea goesingensis
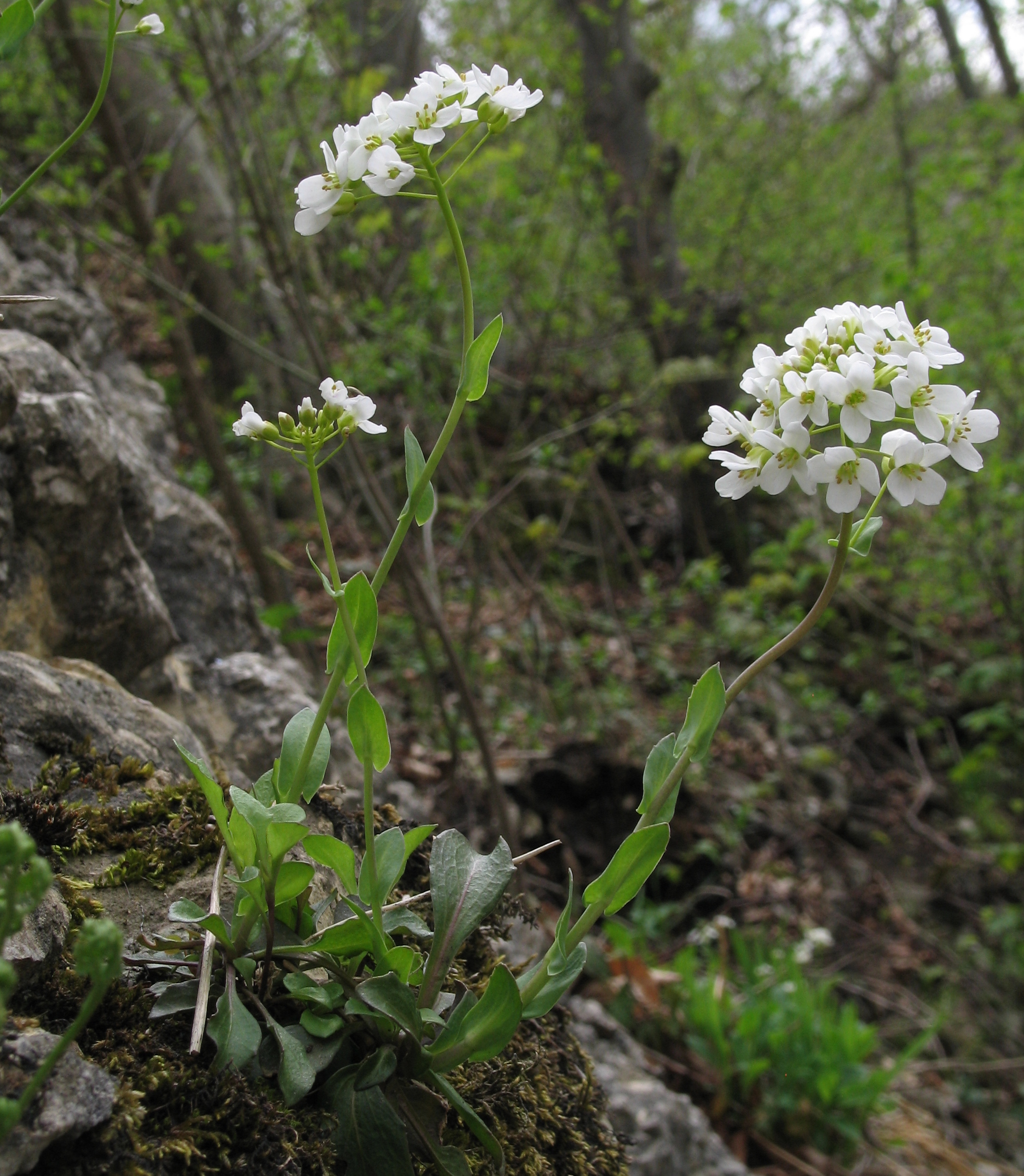
- Noccaea montana

Scientific classification
- Kingdom: Plantae
- Clade: Embryophytes
- Clade: Tracheophytes
- Clade: Spermatophytes
- Clade: Angiosperms
- Clade: Eudicots
- Clade: Rosids
- Order: Brassicales
- Family: Brassicaceae
- Tribe: Coluteocarpeae
- Genus: Noccaea; Moench

Species
- See text

Synonyms
- List: Apterigia Galushko; Atropatenia F.K.Mey.; Brossardia Boiss.; Callothlaspi F.K.Mey.; Coluteocarpus Boiss.; Eunomia DC.; Friedrichkarlmeyeria T.Ali & Thines; Hutchinsia W.T.Aiton; Iberidella Boiss.; Ihsanalshehbazia T.Ali & Thines; Kandis Adans.; Kotschyella F.K.Mey.; Lagowskia Trautv.; Masmenia F.K.Mey.; Microthlaspi F.K.Mey.; Neurotropis (DC.) F.K.Mey.; Pseudosempervivum (Boiss.) Grossh.; Pterotropis Fourr.; Raparia F.K.Mey.; Sichuania Y.Z.Zhao; Syrenopsis Jaub. & Spach; Thlaspiceras F.K.Mey.; Vania F.K.Mey.

= Noccaea =

Genus of Brassicaceae plants

Noccaea is a genus of flowering plants in the family Brassicaceae, native to temperate areas of western North America, southern South America, northern Africa, Europe and Asia.

== Species ==
Currently accepted species include:

- Noccaea abchasica (F.K.Mey.) Al-Shehbaz
- Noccaea aghrica (P.H.Davis & Kit Tan) Firat & Özüdogru
- Noccaea ali-atahanii Güzel, Özüdoğru, Kayıkçı & Özgisi
- Noccaea alpestris (Jacq.) Kerguélen
- Noccaea amani (Post) F.K.Mey.
- Noccaea andersonii (Hook.f. & Thomson) Al-Shehbaz
- Noccaea angustifolia F.K.Mey.
- Noccaea annua (K.Koch) F.K.Mey.
- Noccaea antitaurica (F.K.Mey.) Al-Shehbaz
- Noccaea apterocarpa (Rech.f. & Aellen) Al-Shehbaz & Menke
- Noccaea arctica (A.E.Porsild) Holub
- Noccaea atila-ocakii Özgişi
- Noccaea atlantica (Batt.) Al-Shehbaz
- Noccaea aucheri (Boiss.) Özüdoğru & Al-Shehbaz
- Noccaea banatica (R.Uechtr.) F.K.Mey.
- Noccaea bellidifolia (Griseb.) F.K.Mey.
- Noccaea birolmutlui Özgisi & Özüdogru
- Noccaea boeotica F.K.Mey.
- Noccaea boissieri (Bornm.) D.A.German
- Noccaea borealis F.K.Mey.
- Noccaea bornmuelleri (Rech.f.) Al-Shehbaz
- Noccaea bourgaei (Boiss.) D.A.German
- Noccaea bovis (F.K.Mey.) Al-Shehbaz
- Noccaea brevistyla (DC.) Steud.
- Noccaea bulbosa (Spruner ex Boiss.) Al-Shehbaz
- Noccaea caerulescens (J.Presl & C.Presl) F.K.Mey.
- Noccaea caespitosa (Boiss.) Al-Shehbaz & Menke
- Noccaea camlikensis Aytaç, Nordt & Parolly
- Noccaea campylophylla (F.K.Mey.) Al-Shehbaz
- Noccaea cappadocica (Boiss. & Balansa) Al-Shehbaz
- Noccaea capricornuta (F.K.Mey.) Al-Shehbaz
- Noccaea cariensis (Carlström) Parolly, Nordt & Aytaç
- Noccaea cepaeifolia (Wulfen) Rchb.
- Noccaea cilicica (Schott & Kotschy ex Boiss.) Al-Shehbaz
- Noccaea cochleariformis (DC.) Á.Löve & D.Löve
- Noccaea cochlearioides (Hook.f. & Thomson) Al-Shehbaz
- Noccaea cornuticarpa (Naqshi) Al-Shehbaz
- Noccaea corymbosa (J.Gay) F.K.Mey.
- Noccaea cretica (Degen & Jáv.) F.K.Mey.
- Noccaea cypria (Bornm.) F.K.Mey.
- Noccaea dacica (Heuff.) F.K.Mey.
- Noccaea densiflora (Boiss. & Kotschy) F.K.Mey.
- Noccaea dolichocarpa (Zohary) Al-Shehbaz
- Noccaea eburneosa F.K.Mey.
- Noccaea edinensium F.K.Mey.
- Noccaea eigii (Zohary) Al-Shehbaz
- Noccaea elegans (Boiss.) Al-Shehbaz
- Noccaea epirota (Halácsy) F.K.Mey.
- Noccaea erratica (Jord.) Sennikov
- Noccaea fendleri (A.Gray) Holub
- Noccaea ferganensis (N.Busch) Czerep.
- Noccaea flagellifera (O.E.Schulz) Al-Shehbaz
- Noccaea freynii (N.Busch) Czerep.
- Noccaea gardeziana F.K.Mey.
- Noccaea germanii Al-Shehbaz
- Noccaea goesingensis (Halácsy) F.K.Mey.
- Noccaea graeca (Jord.) F.K.Mey.
- Noccaea granatensis (Boiss. & Reut.) R.Kr.Singh, Deroliya & Sanjeet Kumar
- Noccaea × gremliana (Thell.) F.K.Mey.
- Noccaea griffithiana (Boiss.) F.K.Mey.
- Noccaea haussknechtii (Boiss.) F.K.Mey.
- Noccaea huber-morathii (F.K.Mey.) Al-Shehbaz
- Noccaea iberidea (Boiss.) Al-Shehbaz & Menke
- Noccaea iranica Al-Shehbaz
- Noccaea jankae (A.Kern.) F.K.Mey.
- Noccaea japonica (H.Boissieu) F.K.Mey.
- Noccaea jaubertii (Hedge) Al-Shehbaz
- Noccaea klimesii Al-Shehbaz
- Noccaea kovatsii (Heuff.) F.K.Mey.
- Noccaea kurdica (Hedge) Al-Shehbaz
- Noccaea leblebicii (Gemici & Görk) Raus
- Noccaea libanotica F.K.Mey.
- Noccaea lilacina (Boiss. & A.Huet) Al-Shehbaz
- Noccaea limosellifolia (Reut. ex Burnat) F.K.Mey.
- Noccaea lutescens (Velen.) F.K.Mey.
- Noccaea maassoumii (Mozaff.) Al-Shehbaz
- Noccaea macrantha (Lipsky) F.K.Mey.
- Noccaea magellanica (Pers.) Holub
- Noccaea mediterraneo-orientalis (T.Ali & Thines) R.Kr.Singh & Sanjeet Kumar
- Noccaea mexicana (Standl.) Holub
- Noccaea meyeri Al-Shehbaz
- Noccaea microphylla (Boiss. & Orph.) F.K.Mey.
- Noccaea microstyla (Boiss.) F.K.Mey.
- Noccaea minima (Ard.) F.K.Mey.
- Noccaea montana (L.) F.K.Mey.
- Noccaea mummenhoffiana Özüdoğru & Al-Shehbaz
- Noccaea natolica (Boiss.) Al-Shehbaz
- Noccaea nepalensis Al-Shehbaz
- Noccaea nevadensis (Boiss. & Reut.) F.K.Mey.
- Noccaea ochroleuca (Boiss. & Heldr.) F.K.Mey.
- Noccaea oppositifolia (Pers.) Al-Shehbaz & Menke
- Noccaea orbiculata (Steven ex DC.) Al-Shehbaz
- Noccaea oxyceras (Boiss.) Al-Shehbaz
- Noccaea papillosa (Boiss.) F.K.Mey.
- Noccaea papyracea (Boiss.) Khosravi, Mumm. & Mohsenz.
- Noccaea parviflora (A.Nelson) Holub
- Noccaea perfoliata (L.) Al-Shehbaz
- Noccaea phrygia (Bornm.) F.K.Mey.
- Noccaea platycarpa (Fisch., C.A.Mey. & N.Busch) Al-Shehbaz
- Noccaea praecox (Wulfen) F.K.Mey.
- Noccaea pulvinata (F.K.Mey.) Al-Shehbaz
- Noccaea pumila (Steven) Steud.
- Noccaea rechingeri (F.K.Mey.) Al-Shehbaz
- Noccaea rhodopensis F.K.Mey.
- Noccaea rostrata (N.Busch) Al-Shehbaz
- Noccaea rosularis (Boiss. & Balansa) Al-Shehbaz
- Noccaea rotundifolia (L.) Moench
- Noccaea rubescens (Schott & Kotschy ex Tchich.) F.K.Mey.
- Noccaea sarmatica F.K.Mey.
- Noccaea sempervivum (Boiss. & Balansa) Özüdoğru & Al-Shehbaz
- Noccaea sintenisii (Hausskn. ex Bornm.) F.K.Mey.
- Noccaea stenocarpa (Boiss.) Al-Shehbaz
- Noccaea stenoptera (Boiss. & Reut.) F.K.Mey.
- Noccaea stilosa (Ten.) Rchb.
- Noccaea swatensis F.K.Mey.
- Noccaea sylvarum-cedri (T.Ali & Thines) R.Kr.Singh & Sanjeet Kumar
- Noccaea sylvia (Gaudin) F.K.Mey.
- Noccaea szowitsiana (Boiss.) Al-Shehbaz
- Noccaea tatianae (Bordz.) F.K.Mey.
- Noccaea tenuis (Boiss. & Buhse) F.K.Mey.
- Noccaea thlaspidioides (Pall.) F.K.Mey.
- Noccaea triangularis (F.K.Mey.) Al-Shehbaz
- Noccaea trinervia (DC.) Steud.
- Noccaea tymphaea (Hausskn.) F.K.Mey.
- Noccaea umbellata (F.K.Mey.) Al-Shehbaz
- Noccaea valerianoides (Rech.f.) F.K.Mey.
- Noccaea venusta (Schischk.) D.A.German
- Noccaea versicolor (Stoj. & Kitan.) F.K.Mey.
- Noccaea vesicaria (L.) Al-Shehbaz
- Noccaea violascens (Schott & Kotschy) F.K.Mey.
- Noccaea viridisepala (Podp.) F.K.Mey.
- Noccaea wendelboi (Rech.f.) F.K.Mey.
- Noccaea yunnanensis (Franch.) Al-Shehbaz
- Noccaea zaffranii F.K.Mey.
- Noccaea zangezurica (Tzvelev) Al-Shehbaz
