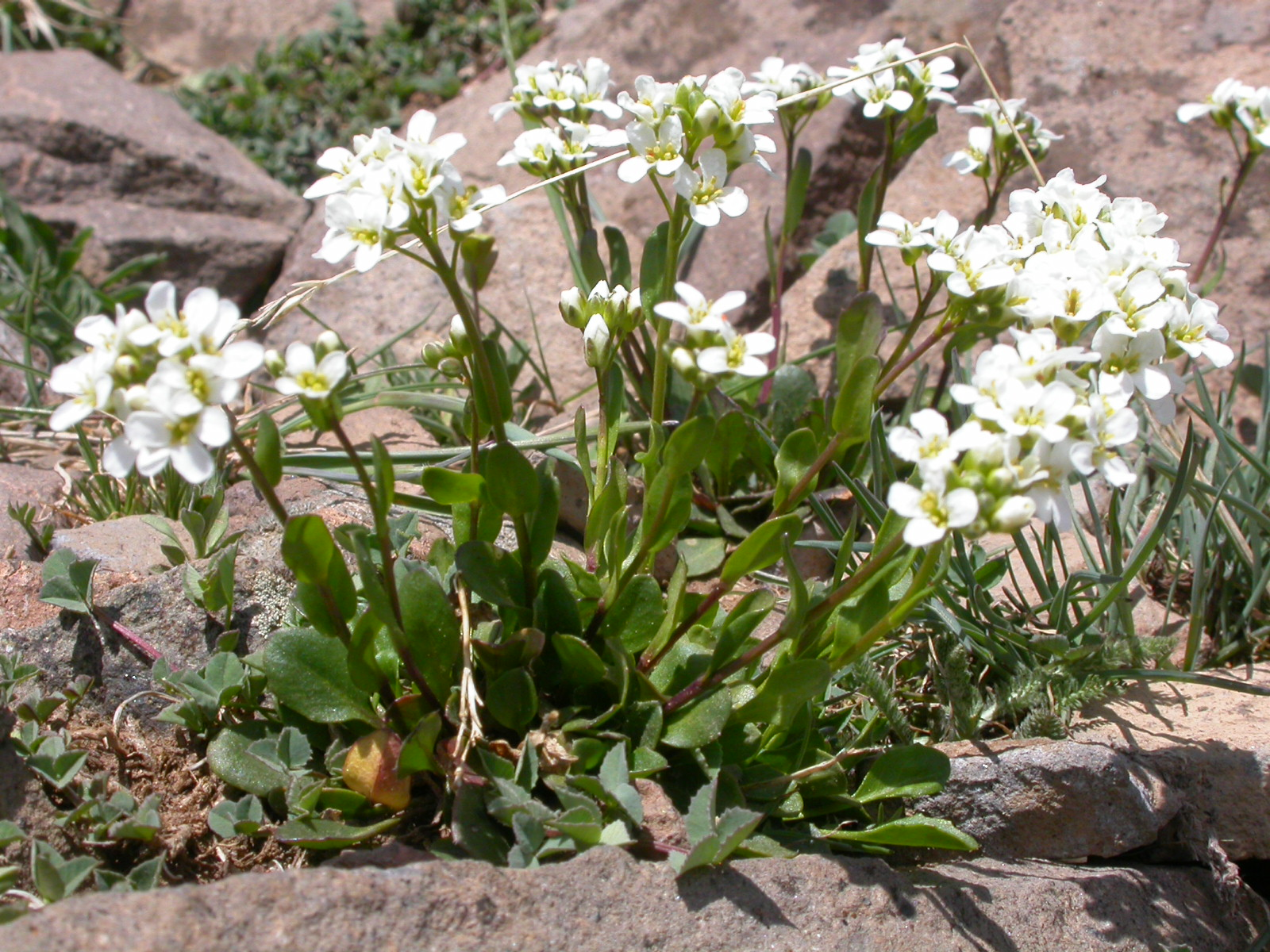

Conservation status
- Secure (NatureServe)

Scientific classification
- Kingdom: Plantae
- Clade: Tracheophytes
- Clade: Angiosperms
- Clade: Eudicots
- Clade: Rosids
- Order: Brassicales
- Family: Brassicaceae
- Genus: Noccaea
- Species: N. fendleri

Binomial name
- Noccaea fendleri (A.Gray) Holub

Subspecies
- Noccaea fendleri subsp. californica (S.Watson) Al-Shehbaz & M.Koch; Noccaea fendleri subsp. fendleri; Noccaea fendleri subsp. glauca (A.Nelson) Al-Shehbaz & M.Koch; Noccaea fendleri subsp. idahoense (Payson) Al-Shehbaz & M.Koch; Noccaea fendleri subsp. siskiyouense (P.K.Holmgren) Al-Shehbaz & M.Koch
- Range of Noccaea fendleri within the United States

Synonyms
- List: Iberis badensis L. (1755); Noccaea coloradensis (Rydb.) Holub (1998); Noccaea glauca (A.Nelson) Holub (1998); Thlaspi aileeniae Rollins (1984); Thlaspi alpestre var. californicum (S.Watson) Jeps. (1925); Thlaspi alpestre var. glaucum A.Nelson (1896); Thlaspi alpestre var. purpurascens (Rydb.) Ostenf. (1910); Thlaspi australe A.Nelson (1945); Thlaspi californicum S.Watson (1882); Thlaspi coloradense Rydb. (1901); Thlaspi fendleri A.Gray (1853); Thlaspi fendleri var. coloradense (Rydb.) Maguire (1942); Thlaspi fendleri var. glaucum (A.Nelson) C.L.Hitchc. (1964); Thlaspi fendleri var. hesperium (Payson) C.L.Hitchc. (1964); Thlaspi fendleri var. idahoense (Payson) C.L.Hitchc. (1964); Thlaspi fendleri var. tenuipes Maguire (1942); Thlaspi fendleri var. typicum Maguire (1942); Thlaspi glaucum (A.Nelson) A.Nelson (1898); Thlaspi glaucum subsp. californicum (S.Watson) Munz (1958); Thlaspi glaucum var. hesperium Payson (1926); Thlaspi glaucum var. pedunculatum Payson (1926); Thlaspi glaucum var. typicum Payson (1926); Thlaspi hesperium (Payson) G.N.Jones (1936); Thlaspi idahoense Payson (1926); Thlaspi idahoense var. aileeniae (Rollins) Rollins (1993); Thlaspi montanum var. californicum (S.Watson) P.K.Holmgren (1971); Thlaspi montanum var. fendleri (A.Gray) P.K.Holmgren (1971); Thlaspi montanum var. idahoense (Payson) P.K.Holmgren (1971); Thlaspi montanum var. siskiyouense P.K.Holmgren (1971); Thlaspi nuttallii Rydb. (1902); Thlaspi prolixum A.Nelson (1945); Thlaspi purpurascens Rydb. (1902); Thlaspi stipitatum A.Nelson (1945)

= Noccaea fendleri =

Western North American species of flowering plant in the cabbage family

Noccaea fendleri more commonly known as wild candytuft and alpine pennycress is a wildflower in the mustard family from western North America. It grows in mountains from northern Mexico to the northern United States. It blooms early in the spring and provides nectar to butterflies.

== Description ==
Noccaea fendleri is a small perennial plant. They range in size from just 1 centimeter to as much as 45 centimeters in height, but are most often 4–32 centimeters tall. The stems may be without branches or be branched near their ends. Very often it will grow as a clump of plants, but may also be a single rosette.

Plants have more basal leaves, ones that grow directly from the base of the plant, than ones on their stems. Leaves are dark green in color and have smooth edges, but are sometimes slightly purple. The leaf surface is smooth, without hairs, and sometimes covered in a waxy coating (glaucous). The shape of the basal leaves are quite variable and may be narrow and grass like (blade linear), a narrow rectangle with rounded corners (oblong leaf), resemble a spear head (oblanceolate), somewhat egg shaped (ovate leaf), be shaped like a teardrop with the stem the narrow end (obovate), or be shaped like a spoon (spatulate). They are also variable in size, 4–30 millimeters long and 2–20 millimeters wide. Leaves are attached to the base of the plant by a small stem (a petiole 0.4–7.3 centimeters long. The leaves on the stems are attached alternately to them and the bases of the leaves partially surround the stems (a clasping leaf). Each stem may have from two to twenty-one leaves.

The species blooms early in the spring, though this varies by local climate and they may bloom from April to August for the most common subspecies. Its flowers usually have white petals and yellow centers, but the flowers sometimes are tinged slightly purple or pink. The petal length is 4.2–13 millimeters long by 1–4.9 millimeters wide.

The fruit is a type of pod called a silicle, two fused carpels that will split open when ripe. They have a range of possible shapes including teardrop shaped (obovate), heart shaped attached at the tip (obcordate), triangular with nearly equal sides (obdeltate), and round with a point (elliptic). The seeds are egg shaped, brown in color, and 1.1–2 millimeters long.

== Taxonomy ==
Noccaea fendleri has a long and complicated taxonomic history. The autonymic name of one of its subspecies, Noccaea fendleri subsp. fendleri, was described and named Iberis badensis by Carl Linnaeus in 1755. Thereafter it was frequently described in the pennycress genus, Thlaspi. It received its current classification and name in 1998 from the botanist Josef Ludwig Holub. As of 2024 this is the classification used in Plants of the World Online, World Flora Online, and the Flora of North America.

=== Subspecies ===
As of 2024 there are five recognized subspecies:

==== Noccaea fendleri subsp. californica ====
This subspecies is distinguished by its elliptic seed pods. It is a rare plant, only known from serpentinite rock outcrops in the Kneeland Prairie area of Humboldt County, California.

==== Noccaea fendleri subsp. fendleri ====
The autonymic subspecies has 4–6 seeds in each fruit, like subspecies glauca. It has longer petals, typically 6.5-11 millimeters and its racemes are usually compact. It grows in the US states of Arizona, New Mexico, and Texas and in northern Mexico.

==== Noccaea fendleri subsp. glauca ====
Subspecies glauca, like fendleri, has 4–6 seeds in each fruit, but has shorter petals. Usually they are 4–7 millimeters long and a more loose and open raceme. This subspecies is a known hyperaccumulator of nickel, with the heavy metal being concentrated in all parts of the plant including the reproductive parts and nectar. It is the most widespread and common of the five subspecies.

==== Noccaea fendleri subsp. idahoense ====
This subspecies has narrower leaves than others, grass like (linear) or like a narrow spear head (narrowly oblanceolate). It has a restricted range and is only found in central Idaho in Blaine, Boise, Custer, Elmore, and Valley counties at elevations of 2100–3700 meters. It is also known by the common name "Idaho candytuft".

==== Noccaea fendleri subsp. siskiyouense ====
This subspecies has 2–4 seeds in each fruit and leaf stems that are much longer than the basal leaves, usually two or three times longer, but sometimes as much as four times longer. It is only found in Curry, Douglas, and Josephine counties in south west Oregon.

=== Names ===
The species was scientifically named by Asa Gray to honor Augustus Fendler, who collected some of the specimens that were used in his 1853 description of it as Thlaspi fendleri. This species is known in English as "alpine pennycress", "mountain pennycress", "wild candytuft", and "Fendler's pennycress".

== Range and habitat ==
Noccaea fendleri is native to western North America from Washington state and Montana in the US to Chihuahua, Coahuila, and Sonora in northern Mexico.

It grows in alpine and montane ecosystems and prefers rocky slopes and forest openings. The most common of its subspecies, glauca, can be found at elevations of 300–4400 meters.

== Cultivation ==
Wild candytuft is used in native plant gardens for its butterfly attracting white flowers. They are winter hardy in USDA zones 2–8 and are adaptable to many soil types. They also will grow in full sun or shade. They tolerate drought conditions by going dormant.
