= H2 Hinde Tree =

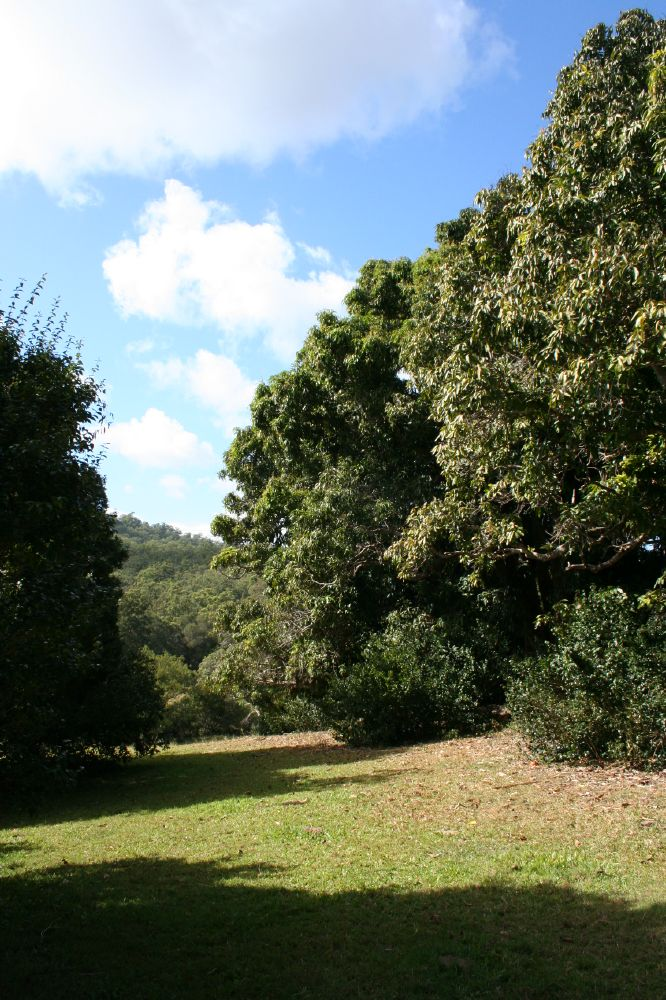
- H2 Hinde Tree, 2008

- Location within Queensland Location within Australia
- 28.0437°S 153.2877°E
- Location: Colliston, 926 Gilston Road, Gilston, City of Gold Coast, Queensland, Australia

Queensland Heritage Register
- Official name: The H2 HINDE TREE (Macadamia integrifolia) on Colliston
- Type: state heritage
- Designated: 14 August 2008
- Reference no.: 602649
- Significant period: 1960s onwards
- Significant components: trees of social, historic or special significance

The H2 Hinde Tree is a heritage-listed tree of the species Macadamia integrifolia at Colliston, 926 Gilston Road, Gilston, City of Gold Coast, Queensland, Australia. It was added to the Queensland Heritage Register on 14 August 2008.

== History ==
The H2 Hinde tree is located on Colliston, a former farm in the Gold Coast hinterland about nine kilometres southwest of Nerang in the Gilston district. It is the parent of a variety (see note below) of the species Macadamia integrifolia and was probably planted in the 1920s. It was registered by the Queensland Department of Agriculture and Stock in 1960 as a scion wood (see note below) and in the two decades after that time, a significant number of commercial orchards in the State propagated trees using material from this tagged parent tree, it being one of only two Australian-developed varieties to have then achieved such a status. The macadamia nut industry is the largest based on an indigenous Australian food crop and since the mid-1990s this country has become the world's largest exporter of the nuts.

Note. The horticultural use of the term "variety" refers to selected clones usually propagated by grafting. A parent tree is a genetically unique plant that is selected for specific traits, in the case of macadamias these include: strong tree growth, low incidence of pests and diseases, low incidence of stick-tights and premature germination of nuts, reduced years to bearing, high kernel quality and desirable market requirements.

Note. The term "scion wood" refers to the part of a tree that is grafted onto the roots or stem of another, known as the rootstock. This grafted branch or bud transmits the flowering or fruiting characteristics of the variety from which it is taken. With macadamia trees grafting is the only method, reliable and speedy enough by commercial standards, of growing a plant that will exhibit the sought after nut bearing characteristics, as they do not always grow true-to-type when propagated from seeds or seedlings.

Colliston was selected by Michael James Hinde in 1879 when land along the upper reaches of the Nerang River was being opened to closer settlement. In 1882 he married Alice Batten, the daughter of a Crown Land Ranger living at Pimpama. According to family lore, it was while he was walking to visit her before they married that he came across some native macadamia nut seedlings, uprooted them and re-planted them on Colliston. Otherwise he practiced small-scale farming and eked out a difficult living for himself and what was to become a large family of eight children, his enterprise emulating the nature of many other farms in the Albert Shire. He was resourceful in his efforts to cultivate new crops and test their worthiness as saleable products. Some of his crop choices reflected those made by many other farmers in the area, including maize and arrowroot in the early years, and turning to oranges in the early twentieth century. Like many others he established a small dairy. In lean times he harvested fruits growing wild on his property, such as raspberries, gooseberries and tomatoes, and caught fish in the river and fowl in the scrub. He planted a vineyard, and practiced apiary. Following his death in 1937 Colliston passed to his eldest son, who engaged a niece and her husband, William Hill, to manage the farm.

Also according to family lore, when his orange trees began to decline (probably in the 1920s), Michael Hinde started to cultivate macadamia trees between them, using material from the native trees he had planted in the early 1880s. A member of the family Proteaceae, series Folliculares and tribe Grevillea, which includes hakea and banksia, the genus Macadamia is divided into tropical and subtropical species. The three main varieties of subtropical macadamia - Macadamia tetraphylla, Macadamia integrifolia, and Macadamia ternifolia - are indigenous to the coastal rainforests of southeastern Queensland and northern New South Wales. Of these only the first two bear edible nuts.

There is some dispute as to which explorer, Allan Cunningham or Ludwig Leichhardt, was the first to encounter macadamia trees in the wild; however none disagree that it was rediscovered in 1857 in the form of a single tree without fruit by Dr Ferdinand von Mueller, Royal Botanist at Melbourne, and Walter Hill, Superintendent of the Brisbane Botanic Gardens, in forest growing along the Pine River. After Mueller returned south, Hill continued to collect samples from the wild, and it was only by accident that he discovered that one species in his collection produced edible, flavoursome nuts. In 1858 Mueller named the new genus in honour of John Macadam, MD, then Secretary of the Philosophic Institute of Victoria to which he presented its discovery; and in the same year Hill planted the first cultivated macadamia at his Botanical Gardens. Hill actively promoted the species throughout Queensland and the world, distributing material wherever he could. However, the proper distinction between the two species that bear edible nuts - M. tetraphylla and M. integrifolia - was not scientifically established until 1954.

According to historical research conducted by Ian McConachie (see note below), following the 1857 "discovery", early settlers were discussing and cultivating macadamias for the quality of the nuts, despite the fact that their scrub-felling practices were destroying many native tree stands. From this time, botanical interest, as well as the delicacy of flavour and texture of the nut, meant seedlings and nuts were rapidly being removed from their native habitats, often to other parts of the world. For example, material was taken from the Mount Bauple area to Hawaii in the 1880s, and specimen trees were being grown at the University of California by the late 1870s and in France by 1890. Along with private individuals and enthusiasts, the New South Wales and Queensland governments distributed macadamia seed widely.

Note. Ian McConachie was made a Member of the Order of Australia in 2006 for his contributions to the macadamia industry as a grower and exporter. He has also had a long involvement with the Australian Macadamia Society Ltd, particularly with its Technical Advisory Committee and has been instrumental in furthering knowledge of the genus and establishing the Macadamia Conservation Trust, which aims to protect remaining native trees.

Macadamia trees, or their nuts, had many different names during this period: in New South Wales they were called Bush Nuts or Mullimbimby Nuts; further north they were called Queensland Nuts or Bauple Nuts (or Bopple and Popple); and in all areas they were known as Australia Nut, Poplar and Nut Oak. Aboriginal groups in each of the localities where the nuts were found wild had named them: boombera was common in New South Wales, the Pine River groups called them burrawang; and in most of Queensland they were called kendel or kindal kindal.

The first Australian commercial macadamia orchards were established in New South Wales from the late 1870s. It was not until 1910 that the first small orchard was planted in Queensland near Coolum. Others in the North Coast hinterland followed. During the first twenty years of the twentieth century both State Departments of Agriculture were actively acquiring knowledge about the crop and assessing its commercial potential, however the issue of cracking the generally thick shells enclosing the edible kernels thwarted development of the industry.

A fledgling cottage macadamia industry emerged in Queensland during the 1920s and 1930s; as a June 1923 article from the Queensland Agricultural Journal suggests: "a considerable acreage has recently been placed under nuts in the State". Around this time a small orchard of approximately 30 macadamia trees, including the tree under discussion here, was established at Colliston, although some experimental plantings may have occurred earlier. The general public was greatly interested in the nuts, evidenced by a 1930s estimation of the large number of trees being grown in backyards; 20,000 in Brisbane and 30,000 between Grafton and Maryborough.

From 1931 the Queensland Department of Agriculture and Stock began to promote macadamia tree cultivation as an adjunct to other farming activities. By November 1933 southeast Queensland growers were having success planting macadamia trees between banana plants, in anticipation that the macadamias would become commercially viable when the bananas began to decline. Reflecting this surge in the industry, the Australian Nut Association was established in 1932 to foster the wider growing of macadamia nuts, although it failed after ten years. Notably for the H2 Hinde macadamia trees growing on Colliston, in 1939 William Hill, then manager of Colliston, and Michael Hinde's brother George, provided assistance with a Queensland Agricultural Journal article identifying where the trees grew wild in the Gilston district and discussing their potential for commercial growing. This was to begin a long association between the managers of Colliston and the author of the article, John McGregor Wills, the State's Senior Advisor in Horticulture who became a great supporter of the commercial potential of the nut.

After World War II the commercial cropping of macadamia trees in Queensland was given renewed attention by its Department of Agriculture and Stock through the methodical survey, selection and experimental propagation of scion and stock material. In 1948 Colliston was visited again by JM Wills to assess the trees growing there. He tagged the trees and took away a range of material, which was investigated in trials, some of which were conducted at the Maroochy Horticultural Experiment Station outside Nambour from the 1950s and into the 1970s. The macadamia varieties Wills identified at Colliston were among other scion woods discussed in an Advisory Leaflet (No. 614) issued by the Division of Plant Industry and published in the Queensland Agricultural Journal in July 1961. The three types of trees that were growing on the property were assigned cultivar names and registered in 1960 as scion wood with the Department of Agriculture and Stock, as follows: H1 Colliston, H2 Hinde and H3 Stevenson. H1 and H3 were of the Macadamia tetraphylla rough-shelled variety, H1 being thin-shelled and H3 hard. H2 Hinde was of the Macadamia integrifolia variety, the shells of which are smooth and of medium thickness. One of its chief distinguishing features is a small indentation in the shell casing.

The H2 Hinde tree is the sole surviving of the three macadamia trees on Colliston that were tagged in 1948 by John McGregor Wills, and finally registered as scion wood and assigned cultivar names in 1960. Of the three originally tagged trees, only the H2 variety was used for commercial purposes. The H2 Hinde tree on Colliston is the parent from which all other clones of this variety have been propagated.

Concerted efforts had been made to develop a viable macadamia nut industry in Hawaii, and it was these successes that spurred developments in the Australian industry. During the 1950s and early 1960s visits to Australia were made by a number of leading US macadamia scientists through the auspices of the California Macadamia Society and Colliston's H-series trees were visited and sampled for testing in Hawaii. Australia did not develop a reliable grafting method until 1958.

During the initial surveys and trials of the 1940s and 1950s, when both Queensland and News South Wales government agriculture departments were visiting Colliston, the H2 Hinde proved itself to be a heavy-bearing Australian variety. When commercial interests began to invest in the industry during the early 1960s, led by the Colonial Sugar Refining Company, the H2 Hinde, only one other Australian cultivar, and a number of Hawaiian cultivars were deemed most suitable for commercial cultivation; the H2 being most appropriate for locations with a temperate climate. From the 1960s and into the 1980s the H2 Hinde as an Australian variety was widely cultivated in the country's commercial macadamia orchards, most notably in New South Wales, and to a lesser extent in Queensland where CSR and its preferences for Hawaiian cultivars predominated. This situation did not change until it was determined that the Hawaiian cultivars did not yield as highly in Australia and further research had to be done to develop more home-grown varieties. This work was led by the Australian Macadamia Society, which was formed out of Queensland in 1974, under the auspices of its Technical Advisory Committee (established in 1980), and the monies it levied from members. A survey of Australian growers revealed that the H2 Hinde was still considered a major variety in 1983. And when varietal performance trials were being conducted a decade later, the H2 Hinde was deemed an industry standard. Currently the two States equally share Australia's world-dominating macadamia export market, but large plantings in Queensland will ensure it becomes the major future producer.

When the commercial orchard trees of the H2 Hinde variety had reached the end of their economic or bearing lives (as distinct from their natural life spans) in the 1980s, they were replaced with trees grown from other scion woods that had been extensively trialled and found to possess a number of desirable characteristics, most notably imperviousness to certain fungal infections. However over the past twenty years the H2 Hinde has been the dominant variety kept by nurseries, with probably 90% of all grafted trees for commercial purposes using it as rootstock. It was its vulnerability to fungal disease that destroyed the small orchard of which the remaining, tagged H2 Hinde tree had been part. Of the two other macadamia cultivars grown on Colliston and registered with the Queensland Department of Agriculture and Stock in 1960, only the H1 Colliston survives.

== Description ==
A single H2 Hinde tree survives from the small macadamia orchard originally planted on Colliston sometime in the 1920s (another H2 tree on the site was planted after grafting trials conducted in the 1950s). What remains of the farm is an almost 11.5 hectares (28 acres) parcel of land situated between the Nerang River and Gilston Road, within 500 metres (1,600 ft) of the Hinze Dam wall and Advancetown Lake in the Gold Coast hinterland. The town centre of Nerang is approximately nine kilometres to the north-east.

The H2 Hinde (Macadamia integrifolia) tree is situated in a corridor of trees running north to south that divides the block in two in this area. It is approximately eight metres tall and has a metal tag painted with orange over one of its main branches, apparently put there by JM Wills during his survey work for the Queensland Department of Agriculture and Stock in 1948 and identifying it as a parent tree. The H1 and H3 macadamia trees were located between five and ten metres to the south. None of the H3 Stevenson trees survive. The remaining H1 Colliston is located about two metres to the east of the outhouse.

== Heritage listing ==
The H2 Hinde Tree (Macadamia integrifolia) on Colliston was listed on the Queensland Heritage Register on 14 August 2008 having satisfied the following criteria.

The place is important in demonstrating the evolution or pattern of Queensland's history.

The H2 Hinde tree (Macadamia integrifolia), c. 1920, which survives on Colliston is significant to the commercial development of the Australian macadamia nut industry, particularly its establishment phase from the 1960s to the 1980s. Only two Australian-grown varieties of macadamia received official endorsement and gained popularity with commercial orchards throughout this State, as well as New South Wales, following extensive experimentation on a range of scion and stock material conducted by the Queensland Department of Agriculture and Stock in the late 1940s and throughout the 1950s. The H2 Hinde at Colliston is the parent tree of one of these two varieties. Since World War II, due to determined efforts on the part of government and commercial groups, the macadamia nut industry has become Australia's largest bush foods industry and dominates the world macadamia export market. The H2 Hinde tree cultivated at Colliston has played a key role in this success, first as scion wood, and in the last twenty years, as the parent of most rootstock used to propagate the large majority of commercial orchard macadamia trees in Australia.
