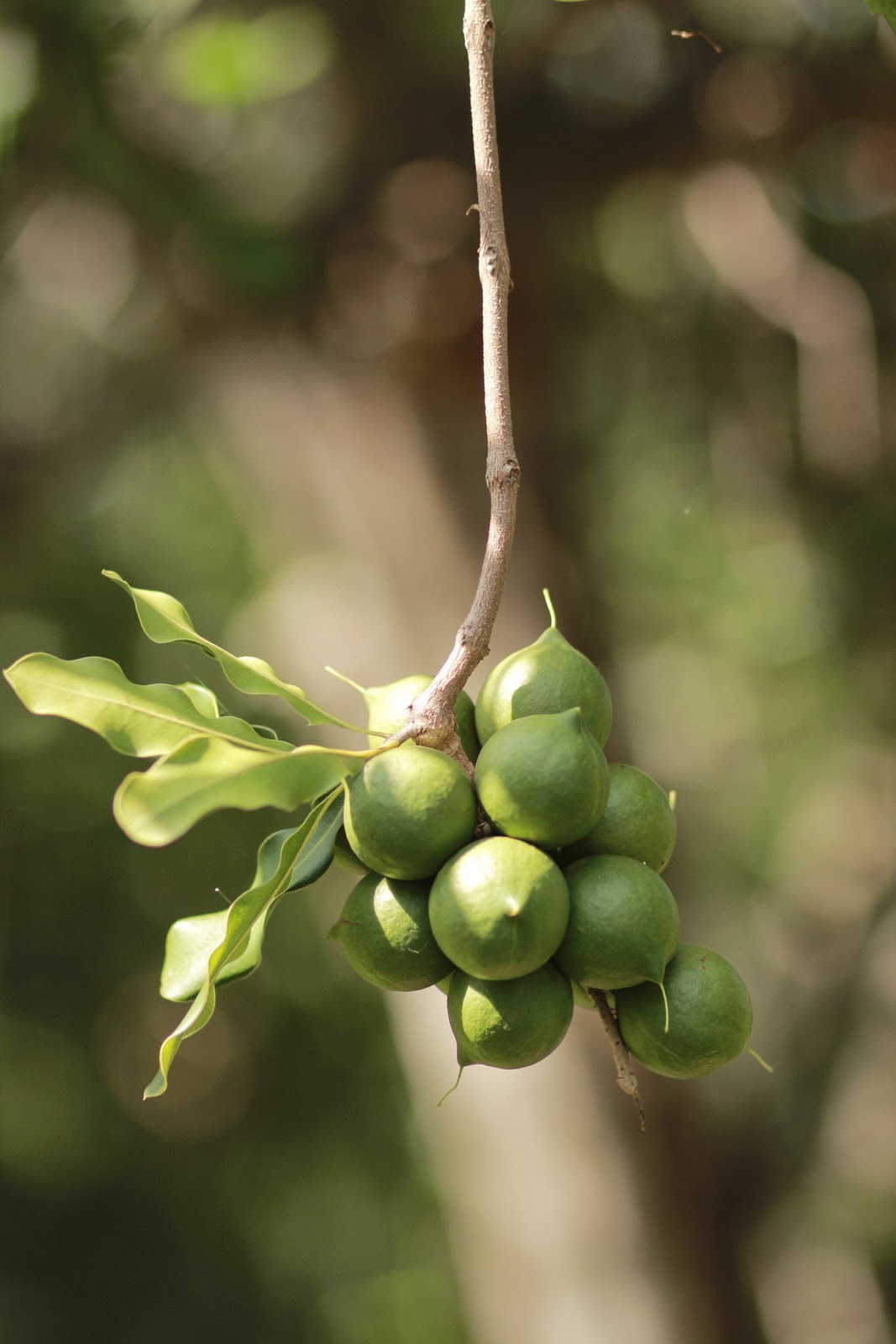
- Macadamia nuts

Scientific classification
- Kingdom: Plantae
- Clade: Tracheophytes
- Clade: Angiosperms
- Clade: Eudicots
- Order: Proteales
- Family: Proteaceae
- Subfamily: Grevilleoideae
- Tribe: Macadamieae
- Subtribe: Macadamiinae
- Genus: Macadamia; F.Muell.

Type species
- Macadamia integrifolia Maiden & Betche

Species
- Macadamia integrifolia Maiden & Betche; Macadamia jansenii C.L.Gross & P.H.Weston; Macadamia ternifolia F.Muell.; Macadamia tetraphylla L.A.S.Johnson

= Macadamia =

Genus of plants indigenous to Australia

Macadamia is a genus of four species of trees in the flowering plant family Proteaceae. They are indigenous to Australia—specifically, northeastern New South Wales and central and southeastern Queensland. Two species of the genus are commercially important for their fruit, the macadamia nut /ˌmækəˈdeɪmiə/ (or simply macadamia). Global production in 2025 was 344,000 tonnes (379,000 short tons). Other names include Queensland nut, bush nut, maroochi nut or bauple nut. It was an important source of bushfood for the Aboriginal peoples.

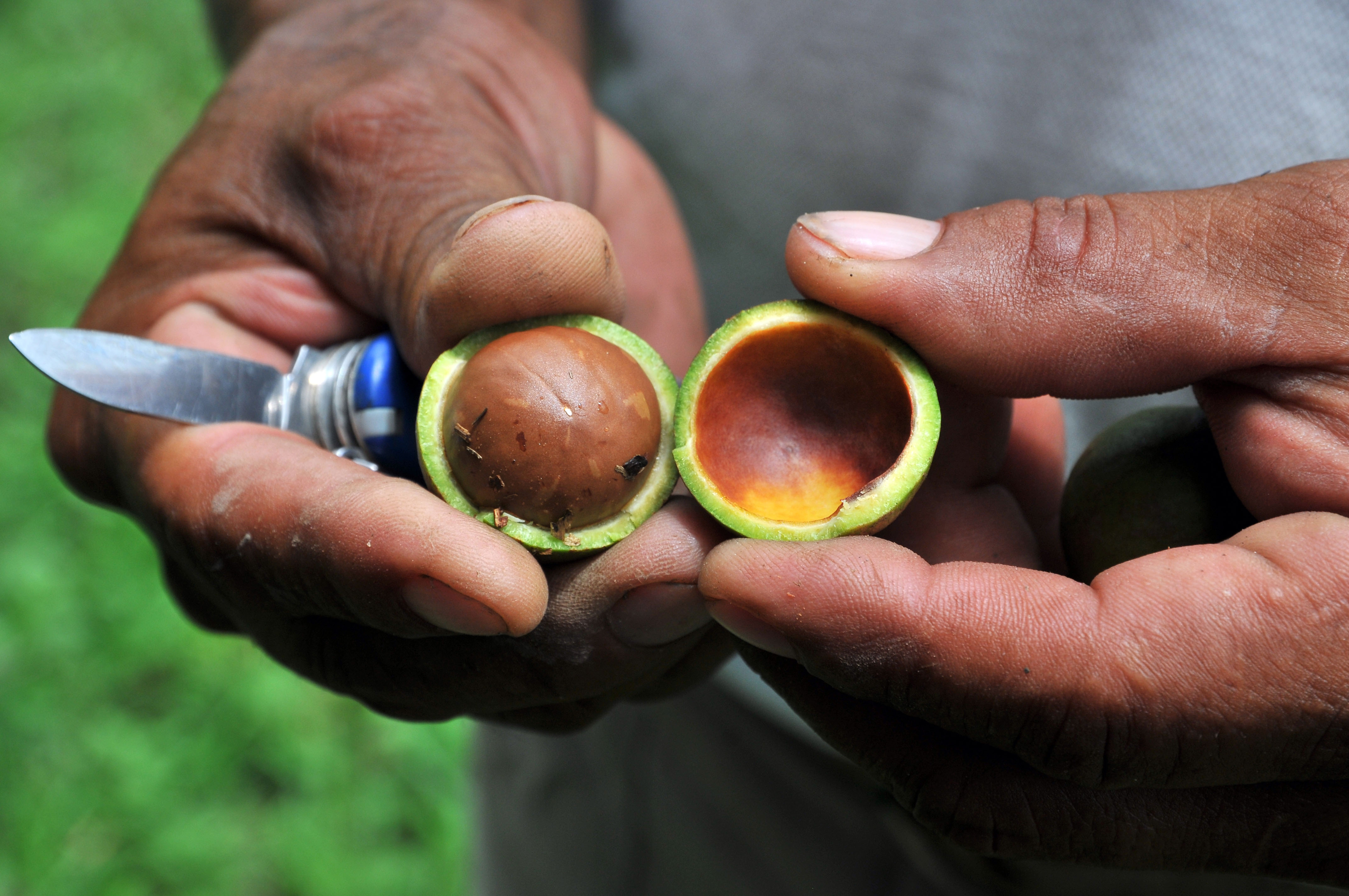
Fresh macadamia nut with husk or pericarp cut in half

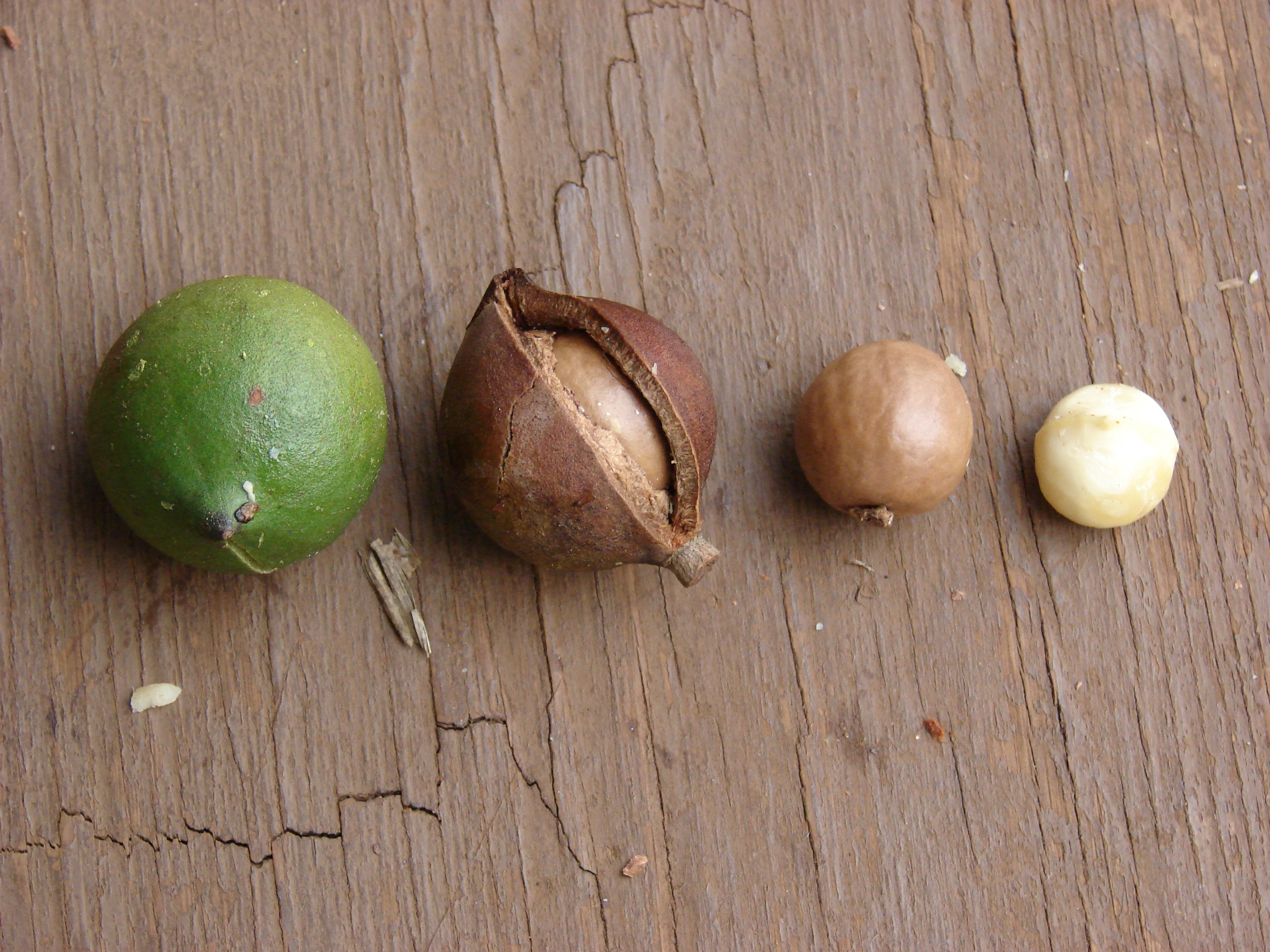
Stages of a Macadamia integrifolia nut: unripe, ripe, husk peeled, deshelled

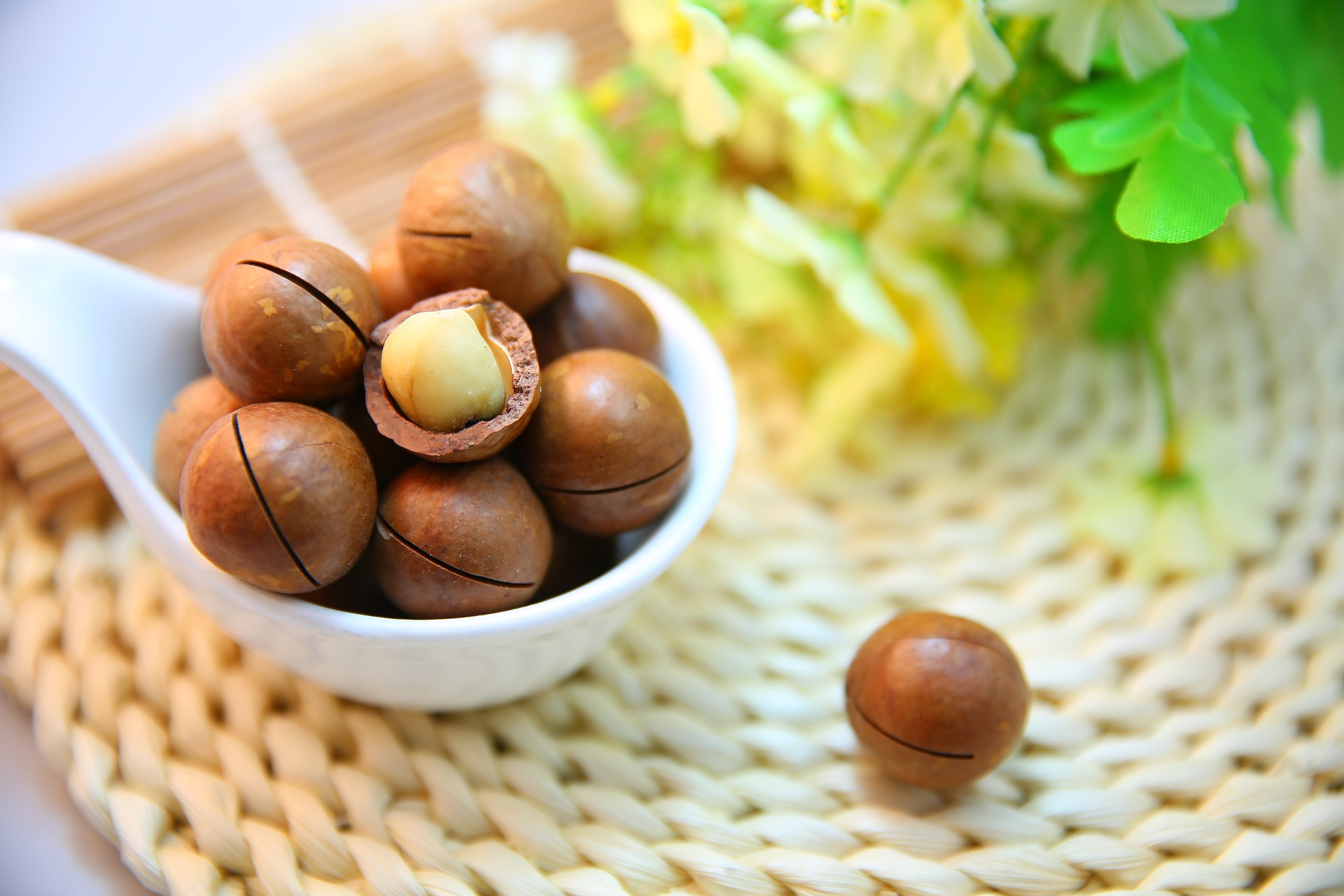
Roasted macadamia nuts with sawn nutshell, one cracked open

The nut was first commercially produced on a wide scale in Hawaii, where Australian seeds were introduced in the 1880s, and which for more than a century was the world's largest producer. South Africa has been the world's largest producer of the macadamia since the 2010s.

The macadamia is the only widely grown food plant that is native to Australia.

== Description ==
Macadamia is a genus of evergreen trees that grows 2–12 m (7–40 ft) tall.

The leaves are arranged in whorls of three to six, lanceolate to obovate or elliptic in shape, 60–300 mm (2 1/2–12 in) long and 30–130 mm (1 1/8–5 1/8 in) broad, with an entire or spiny-serrated margin. The flowers are produced in a long, slender, and simple raceme 50–300 mm (2–12 in) long, the individual flowers 10–15 mm (3/8–9/16 in) long, white to pink or purple, with four tepals. The fruit is a hard, woody, globose follicle with a pointed apex containing one or two seeds. The nutshell ("coat") is particularly tough and requires around 2000 N to crack. The shell material is five times harder than hazelnut shells and has mechanical properties similar to aluminum. It has a Vickers hardness of 35.

== Taxonomy ==
=== Species ===
Image	Scientific name	Distribution
	Macadamia integrifolia Maiden & Betche	south east Queensland and extreme adjacent northern New South Wales
	Macadamia jansenii C.L.Gross & P.H.Weston	Queensland
	Macadamia ternifolia F.Muell.	Queensland
	Macadamia tetraphylla L.A.S.Johnson	extreme south east Queensland and northern New South Wales

Nuts from M. jansenii and M. ternifolia contain cyanogenic glycosides. The other two species are cultivated for the commercial production of macadamia nuts for human consumption.

Previously, more species with disjunct distributions were named as members of this genus Macadamia. Genetics and morphological studies published in 2008 show they have separated from the genus Macadamia, correlating less closely than thought from earlier morphological studies. The species previously named in the genus Macadamia may still be referred to overall by the descriptive, non-scientific name of macadamia.

Formerly included in the genus
Lasjia P.H.Weston & A.R.Mast, formerly Macadamia until 2008

- Lasjia claudiensis (C.L.Gross & B.Hyland) Peter H. Weston & A.R.Mast; synonym, base name: Macadamia claudiensis C.L.Gross & B.Hyland
- Lasjia erecta (J.A.McDonald & R.Ismail) P.H.Weston & A.R.Mast; synonym, base name: Macadamia erecta J.A.McDonald & R.Ismail
  A tree endemic to the island of Sulawesi, Indonesia. First described by science in 1995.
- Lasjia grandis (C.L.Gross & B.Hyland) P.H.Weston & A.R.Mast; synonym, base name: Macadamia grandis C.L.Gross & B.Hyland
- Lasjia hildebrandii (Steenis) P.H.Weston & A.R.Mast; synonym, base name: Macadamia hildebrandii Steenis
  Another species endemic to Sulawesi.
- Lasjia whelanii (F.M.Bailey) P.H.Weston & A.R.Mast; synonyms: base name: Helicia whelanii F.M.Bailey, Macadamia whelanii (F.M.Bailey) F.M.Bailey

Catalepidia Peter H. Weston, formerly Macadamia until 1995

- Catalepidia heyana (F.M.Bailey) P.H.Weston; synonyms: base name: Helicia heyana F.M.Bailey, Macadamia heyana (F.M.Bailey) Sleumer

Virotia L.A.S.Johnson & B.G.Briggs, formerly Macadamia until the first species renaming began in 1975 and comprehensive in 2008

- Virotia angustifolia (Virot) P.H.Weston & A.R.Mast; synonym, base name: Macadamia angustifolia Virot
- Virotia francii (Guillaumin) P.H.Weston & A.R.Mast; synonym, base name: Roupala francii Guillaumin
- Virotia leptophylla (Guillaumin) L.A.S.Johnson & B.G.Briggs (1975 type species); synonym, base name: Kermadecia leptophylla Guillaumin
- Virotia neurophylla (Guillaumin) P.H.Weston & A.R.Mast; synonyms: base name: Kermadecia neurophylla Guillaumin, Macadamia neurophylla (Guillaumin) Virot
- Virotia rousselii (Vieill.) P.H.Weston & A.R.Mast; synonym, base name: Roupala rousselii Vieill
- Virotia vieillardi (Brongn. & Gris) P.H.Weston & A.R.Mast; synonym, base name: Roupala vieillardii Brongn. & Gris

=== Etymology ===
The German-Australian botanist Ferdinand von Mueller gave the genus the name Macadamia in 1857 in honour of the Scottish-Australian chemist, medical teacher, and politician John Macadam, who was the honorary Secretary of the Philosophical Institute of Victoria beginning in 1857.

== Cultivation ==
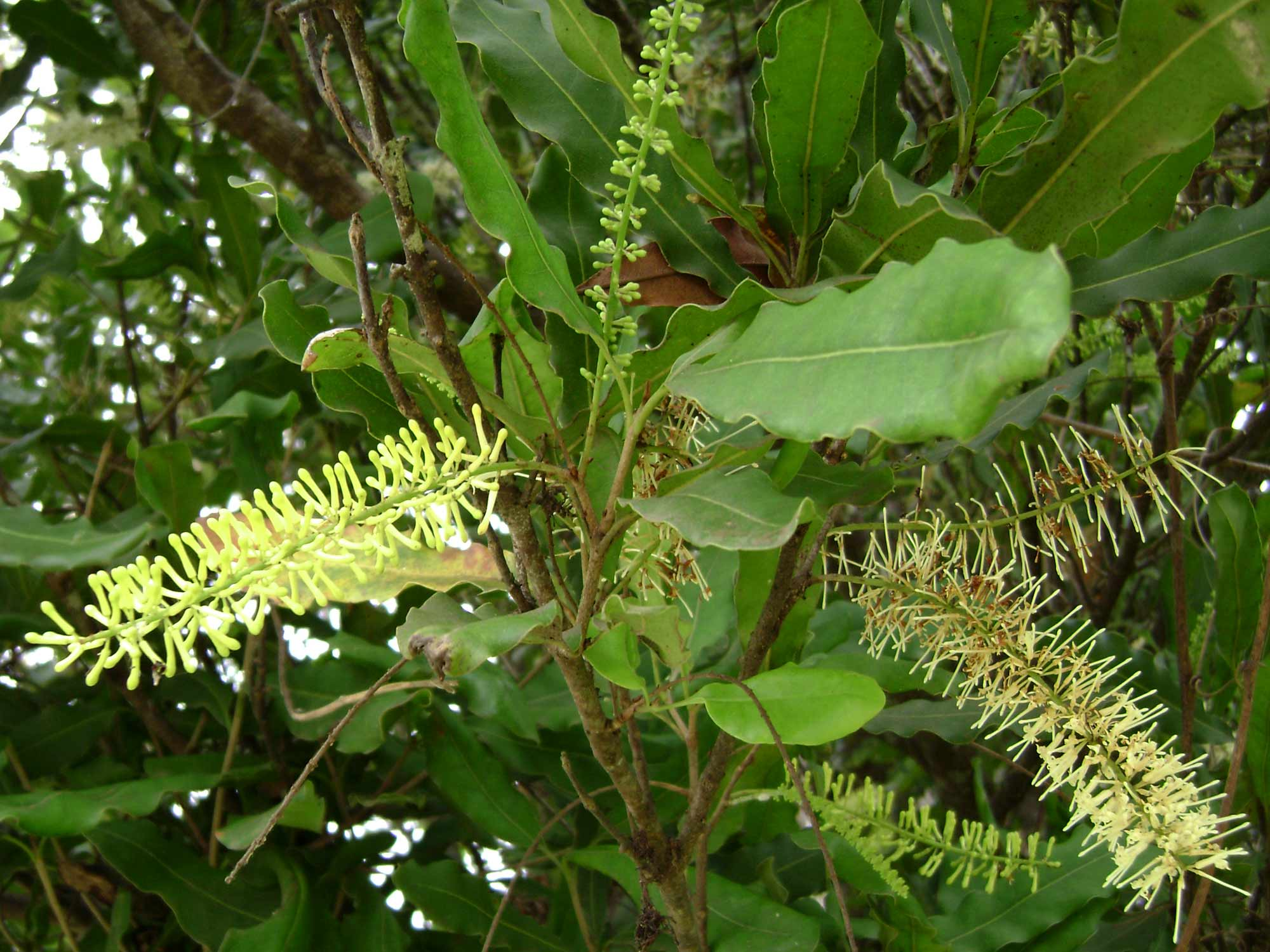
Macadamia integrifolia flowers

The macadamia tree is usually propagated by grafting. It does not begin to produce commercial quantities of seeds until it is 7–10 years old, but once established, it may continue bearing for over 100 years. Macadamias prefer fertile, well-drained soils, a rainfall of 1,000–2,000 mm (40–80 in), and temperatures not falling below 10 °C (50 °F) (although once established, they can withstand light frosts), with an optimum temperature of 25 °C (80 °F). The roots are shallow, and trees can be blown down in storms; like most Proteaceae, they are also susceptible to Phytophthora root disease. As of 2019, the macadamia nut is the most expensive nut in the world, which is attributed to the slow harvesting process.

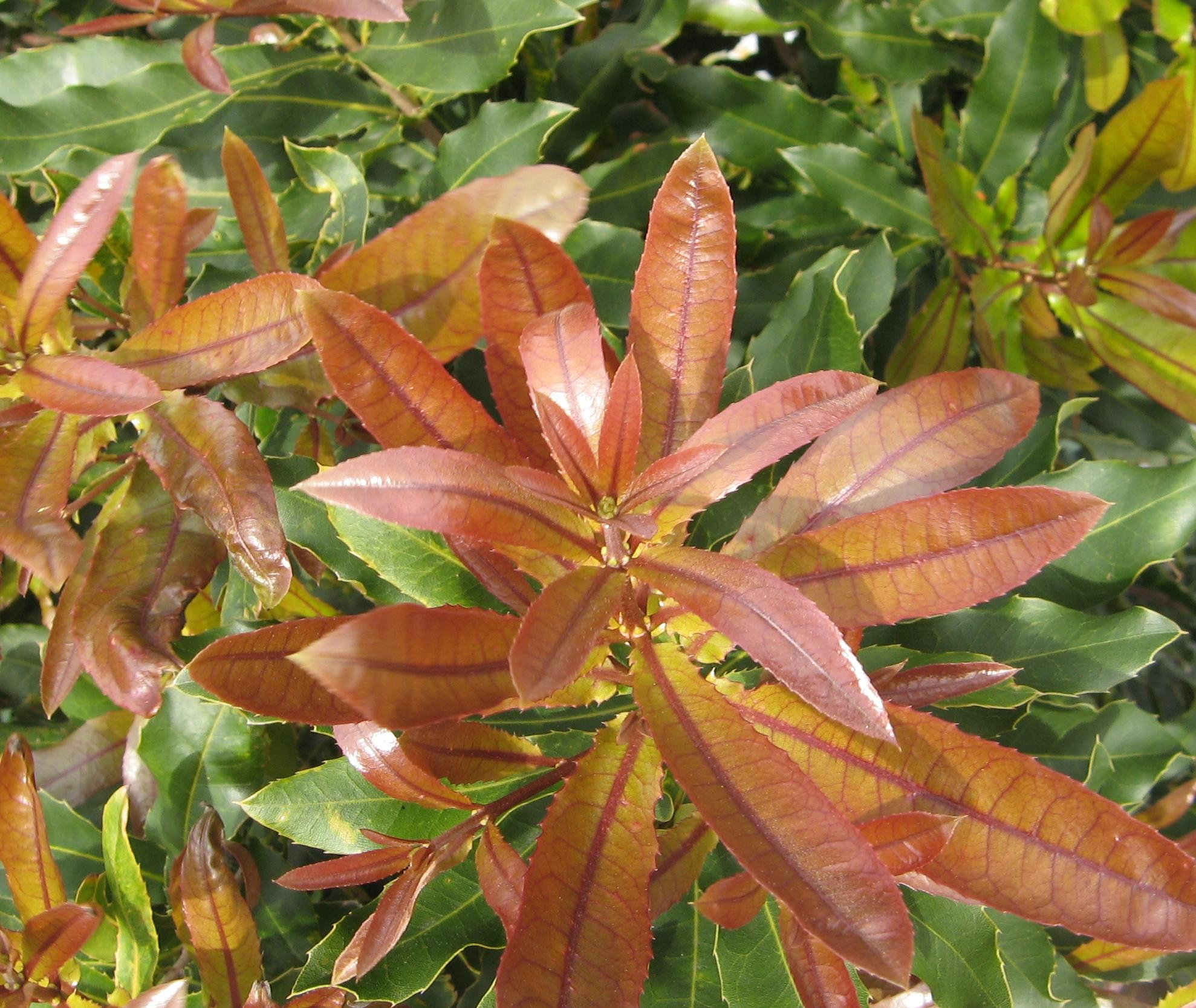
Macadamia 'Beaumont' in new growth

=== Cultivars ===
==== Beaumont ====
A Macadamia integrifolia / M. tetraphylla hybrid commercial variety is widely planted in Australia and New Zealand; Dr. J. H. Beaumont discovered it. It is high in oil but is not sweet. New leaves are reddish, and flowers are bright pink, borne on long racemes. It is one of the quickest varieties to come into bearing once planted in the garden, usually carrying a useful crop by the fourth year and improving from then on. It crops prodigiously when well pollinated. The impressive, grape-like clusters are sometimes so heavy they break the branchlets to which they are attached. Commercial orchards have reached 18 kg (40 lb) per tree by eight years old. On the downside, the macadamias do not drop from the tree when ripe, and the leaves are a bit prickly when one reaches into the tree's interior during harvest. Its shell is easier to open than that of most commercial varieties.

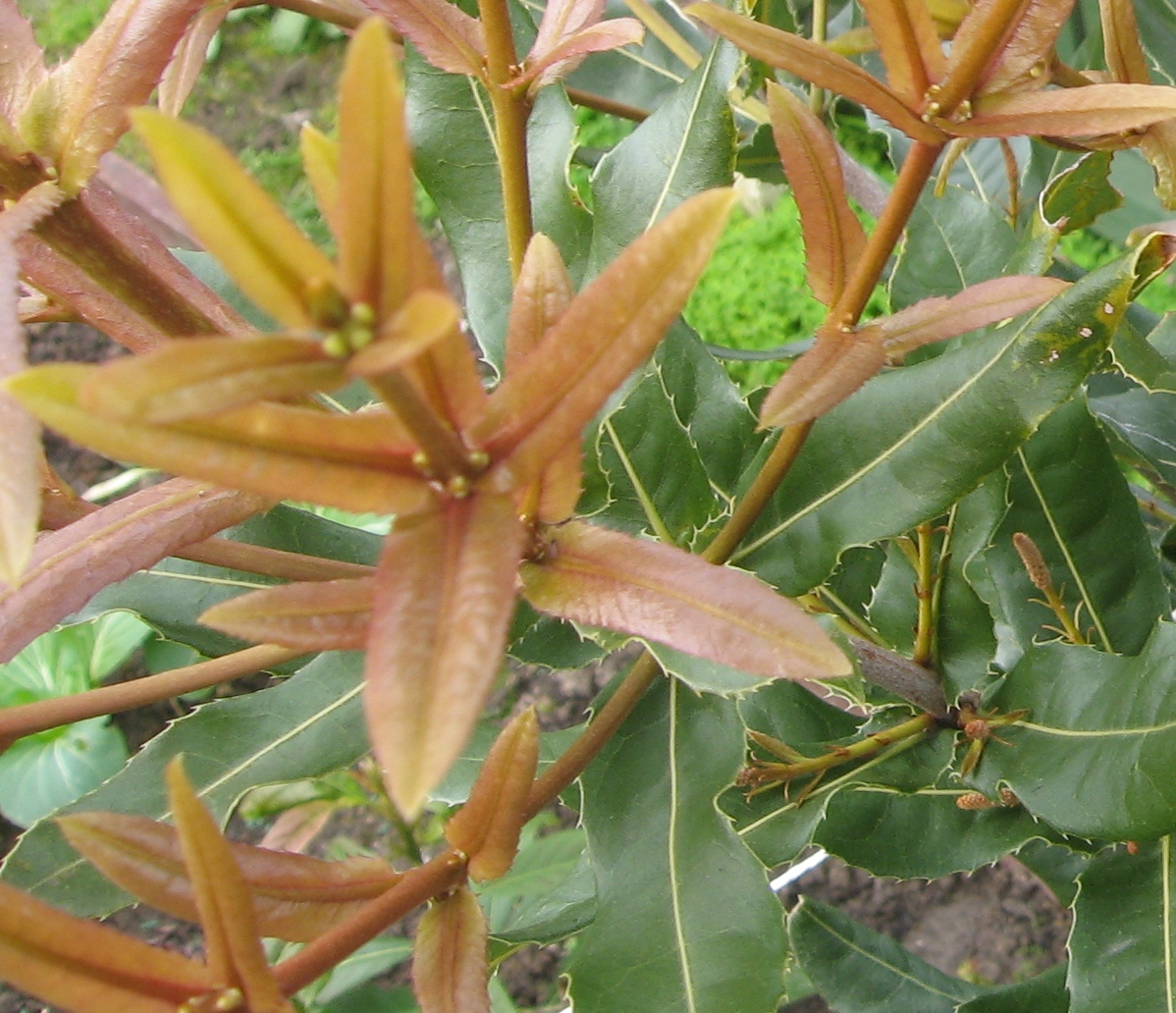
Macadamia 'Maroochy' new growth

==== Maroochy ====
A pure M. tetraphylla variety from Australia, this strain is cultivated for its productive crop yield, flavour, and suitability for pollinating 'Beaumont.'

==== Nelmac II ====
A South African M. integrifolia / M. tetraphylla hybrid cultivar, it has a sweet seed, which means it must be cooked carefully so that the sugars do not caramelise. The sweet seed is usually not fully processed, as it generally does not taste as good, but many people enjoy eating it uncooked. It has an open micropyle (hole in the shell), which may let in fungal spores. The crack-out percentage (ratio of nut meat to the whole nut by weight) is high. Ten-year-old trees average 22 kg (50 lb) per tree. It is a popular variety because of its pollination of 'Beaumont,' and the yields are almost comparable.

==== Renown ====
A M. integrifolia / M. tetraphylla hybrid, this is a rather spreading tree. On the plus side, it is high-yielding commercially; 17 kg (37 lb) from a 9-year-old tree has been recorded, and the nuts drop to the ground. However, they are thick-shelled, with not much flavour.

== Production ==
In 2024, South Africa was the leading producer of macadamia nuts, with 87,000 tonnes, up from 77,000 tonnes in 2023 and 54,000 tonnes out of global production of 211,000 tonnes in 2018. Macadamia is commercially produced in many countries of East Africa, Southeast Asia, South America, Australia, and North America having Mediterranean, temperate or tropical climates.

=== History ===
The first commercial orchard of macadamia trees was planted in the early 1880s by Rous Mill, 12 km (7.5 mi) southeast of Lismore, New South Wales, consisting of M. tetraphylla. Besides the development of a small boutique industry in Australia during the late 19th and early 20th centuries, macadamia was extensively planted as a commercial crop in Hawaii from the 1920s onward. Macadamia seeds were first imported into Hawaii in 1882 by William H. Purvis, who planted seeds that year at Kapulena. The Hawaiian-produced macadamia established the well-known seed internationally, and in 2017, Hawaii produced over 22,000 tonnes.

In 2019, researchers collected samples from hundreds of trees in Queensland and compared their genetic profiles to samples from Hawaiian orchards. They determined that essentially all the Hawaiian trees must have descended from a small population of Australian trees from Gympie, possibly just a single tree. This lack of genetic diversity in the commercial crop puts it at risk of succumbing to pathogens (as has happened in the past to banana cultivars). Growers may seek to diversify the cultivated population by hybridizing with wild specimens.

=== Shelling ===
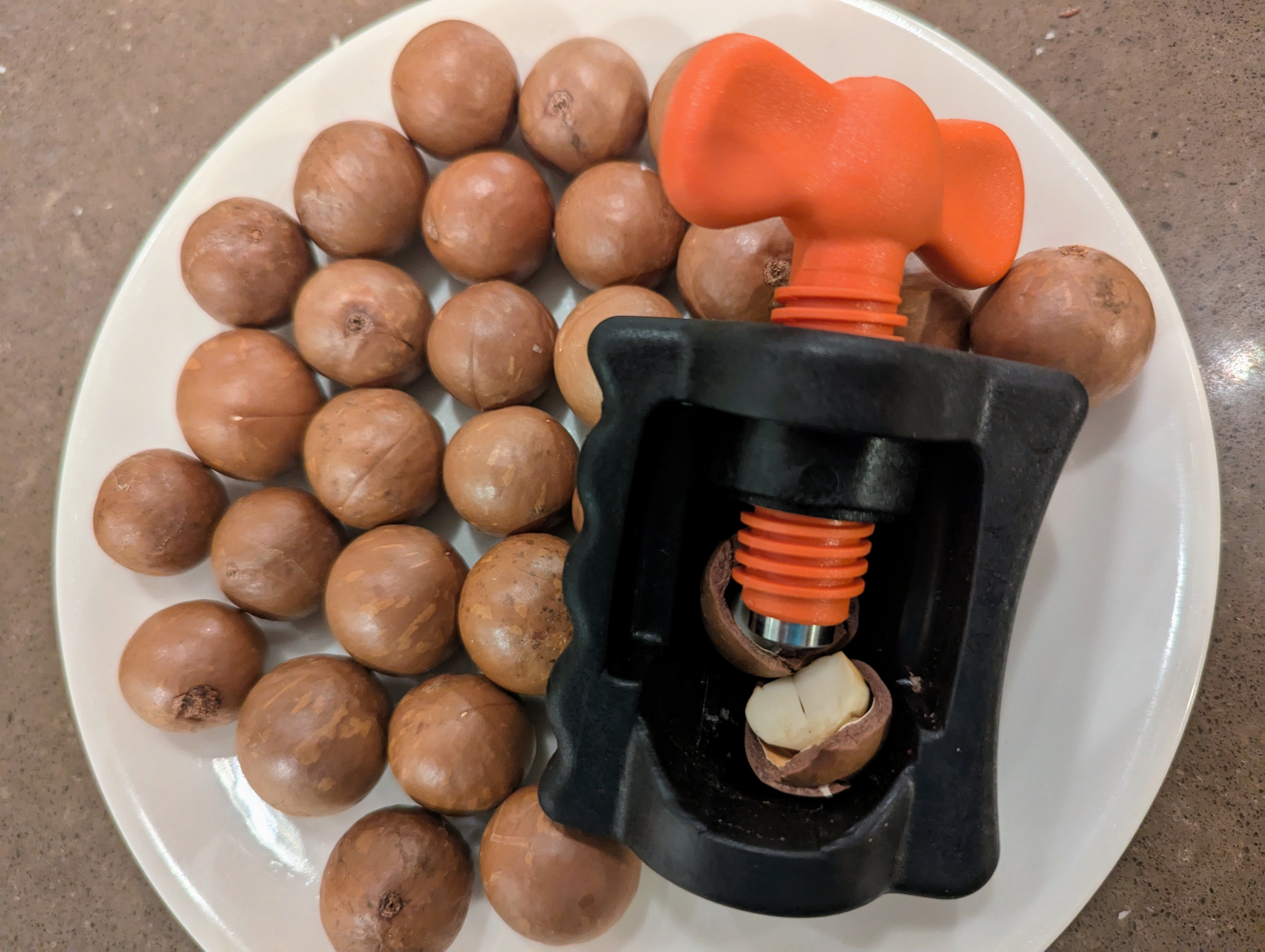
Screw-type macadamia nut cracker on a plate of unshelled macadamias

Macadamias are the world's hardest edible nut to crack. Since ordinary nutcrackers apply insufficient force, various types of specialist macadamia nut crackers are available, many of which apply force to the micropyle, visible as a white dot, to fracture the shell.

For commercial scale deshelling, rotating steel rollers are used. In South Africa, the average crack-out rate, meaning the ratio of usable nut to discarded shell, is 27.6% nut to 72.4% waste.

== Toxicity ==
Nuts from M. jansenii and M. ternifolia contain cyanogenic glycosides.

=== Allergen ===
Macadamia allergy is a type of food allergy to macadamia nuts which is relatively rare, affecting less than 5% of people with tree nut allergy in the United States. Macadamia allergy can cause mild to severe allergic reactions, such as oral allergy syndrome, urticaria, angioedema, vomiting, abdominal pain, asthma, and anaphylaxis. Macadamia allergy can also cross-react with other tree nuts or foods that have similar allergenic proteins, such as coconut, walnut, hazelnut, and cashew. The diagnosis and management of macadamia allergy involves avoiding macadamia nuts and their derivatives, reading food labels carefully, carrying an epinephrine auto-injector in case of severe reactions, and consulting a doctor for further testing and advice.

=== Toxicity in dogs and cats ===
Macadamias are toxic to dogs. Ingestion may result in macadamia toxicity marked by weakness and hind limb paralysis with the inability to stand, occurring within 12 hours of ingestion. It is not known what makes macadamia nuts toxic in dogs. Depending on the quantity ingested and the size of the dog, symptoms may also include muscle tremors, joint pain, and severe abdominal pain. In high doses of toxin, opiate medication may be required for symptom relief until the toxic effects diminish, with full recovery usually within 24 to 48 hours.

Macadamias are also toxic to cats, causing tremors, paralysis, joint stiffness, and high fever.

== Uses ==
=== Nutrition ===
Macadamia nuts, raw
Nutritional value per 100 g (3.5 oz)
- Energy: 3,080 kJ (740 kcal)
- Carbohydrates: 13.8 g
- Sugars: 4.57 g
- Dietary fiber: 8.6 g
- Fat: 75.8 g
- Saturated: 12 g
- Monounsaturated: 59 g
- Polyunsaturated: 1.5 g
- Protein: 7.9 g
Vitamins and minerals
Vitamins	Quantity %DV^{†}
Thiamine (B1)	100% 1.195 mg
Riboflavin (B2)	12% 0.162 mg
Niacin (B3)	15% 2.473 mg
Pantothenic acid (B5)	15% 0.76 mg
Vitamin B6	16% 0.275 mg
Folate (B9)	3% 11 μg
Vitamin C	1% 1.2 mg
Vitamin E	4% 0.54 mg
Minerals	Quantity %DV^{†}
Calcium	7% 85 mg
Iron	21% 3.69 mg
Magnesium	31% 130 mg
Manganese	178% 4.1 mg
Phosphorus	15% 188 mg
Potassium	12% 368 mg
Zinc	12% 1.30 mg
- Other constituents: Quantity
- Water: 1.4 g
- Link to USDA Database entry
- ^{†}Percentages estimated using US recommendations for adults, except for potassium, which is estimated based on expert recommendation from the National Academies.

Raw macadamia nuts are 1% water, 14% carbohydrates, 76% fat, and 8% protein (table). In a reference amount of 100 g (3.5 oz), macadamia nuts provide 740 kilocalories of food energy, and are a rich source (20% or more of the Daily Value, DV) of thiamine, iron, magnesium, and manganese, with other B vitamins and dietary minerals in moderate amounts (table).

Raw macadamia nuts have a high amount of monounsaturated fats (59% of total fat content) and contain the saturated fatty acid, palmitic acid (reference in table).

=== Other uses ===
The trees are also grown as ornamental plants in subtropical regions for their glossy foliage and attractive flowers. The flowers produce a well-regarded honey. The wood is used decoratively for small items. Macadamia species are used as food plants by the larvae of some Lepidoptera species, including Batrachedra arenosella.

Macadamia seeds are often fed to hyacinth macaws in captivity. These large parrots are among the few animals, other than humans, capable of cracking the shell and removing the seed.

== Modern history ==
1828
Allan Cunningham was the first European to encounter the macadamia plant in Australia.
1857–1858
German-Australian botanist Ferdinand von Mueller named the genus Macadamia after his friend John Macadam, a noted scientist and secretary of the Philosophical Institute of Australia.
1858
'Bauple nuts' were discovered in Bauple, Queensland; they are now known as macadamia nuts.
Walter Hill, superintendent of the Brisbane Botanic Gardens (Australia), observed a boy eating the kernel without ill effect, becoming the first nonindigenous person recorded to eat macadamia nuts.
1860s
King Jacky, an aboriginal elder of the Logan River clan, south of Brisbane, Queensland, was the first known macadamia entrepreneur in his tribe and he regularly collected and traded the macadamias with settlers.
1866
Tom Petrie planted macadamias at Yebri Creek (near Petrie) from nuts obtained from Aboriginals at Buderim.
1882
William H. Purvis introduced macadamia nuts to Hawaii as a windbreak for sugar cane.
1888
The first commercial orchard of macadamias was planted at Rous Mill, 12 km from Lismore, New South Wales, by Charles Staff.
1889
Joseph Maiden, an Australian botanist, wrote, "It is well worth extensive cultivation, for the nuts are always eagerly bought."
1910
The Hawaiian Agricultural Experiment Station encouraged the planting of macadamias on Hawaii's Kona District as a crop to supplement coffee production in the region.
1916
Tom Petrie begins trial macadamia plantations in Maryborough, Queensland, combining macadamia with pecans to shelter the trees.
1922
Ernest van Tassel formed the Hawaiian Macadamia Nut Co. in Hawaii.
1925
Tassel leased 75 acres (30 ha) on Round Top in Honolulu and began Nutridge, Hawaii's first macadamia seed farm.
1931
Tassel established a macadamia-processing factory on Puhukaina Street in Kakaako, Hawaii, selling the nuts as Van's Macadamia Nuts.
1937
Winston Jones and J. H. Beaumont of the University of Hawaiʻi's Agricultural Experiment Station reported the first successful grafting of macadamias, paving the way for mass production.
1946
A large plantation was established in Hawaii.
1953
Castle & Cooke added a new brand of macadamia nuts called "Royal Hawaiian," which was credited with popularizing the nuts in the U.S.
1991
A fourth macadamia species, Macadamia jansenii, was described, being first brought to the attention of plant scientists in 1983 by Ray Jansen, a sugarcane farmer and amateur botanist from South Kolan in Central Queensland.
1997
Australia surpassed the United States as the major producer of macadamias.
2012–2015
South Africa surpassed Australia as the largest producer of macadamias.
2014
The manner in which macadamia nuts were served on Korean Air Flight 86 from John F. Kennedy International Airport in New York City led to a "nut rage incident", which gave the nuts high visibility in South Korea and marked a sharp increase in consumption there.

== See also ==
- Macadamia oil
- Bush tucker
