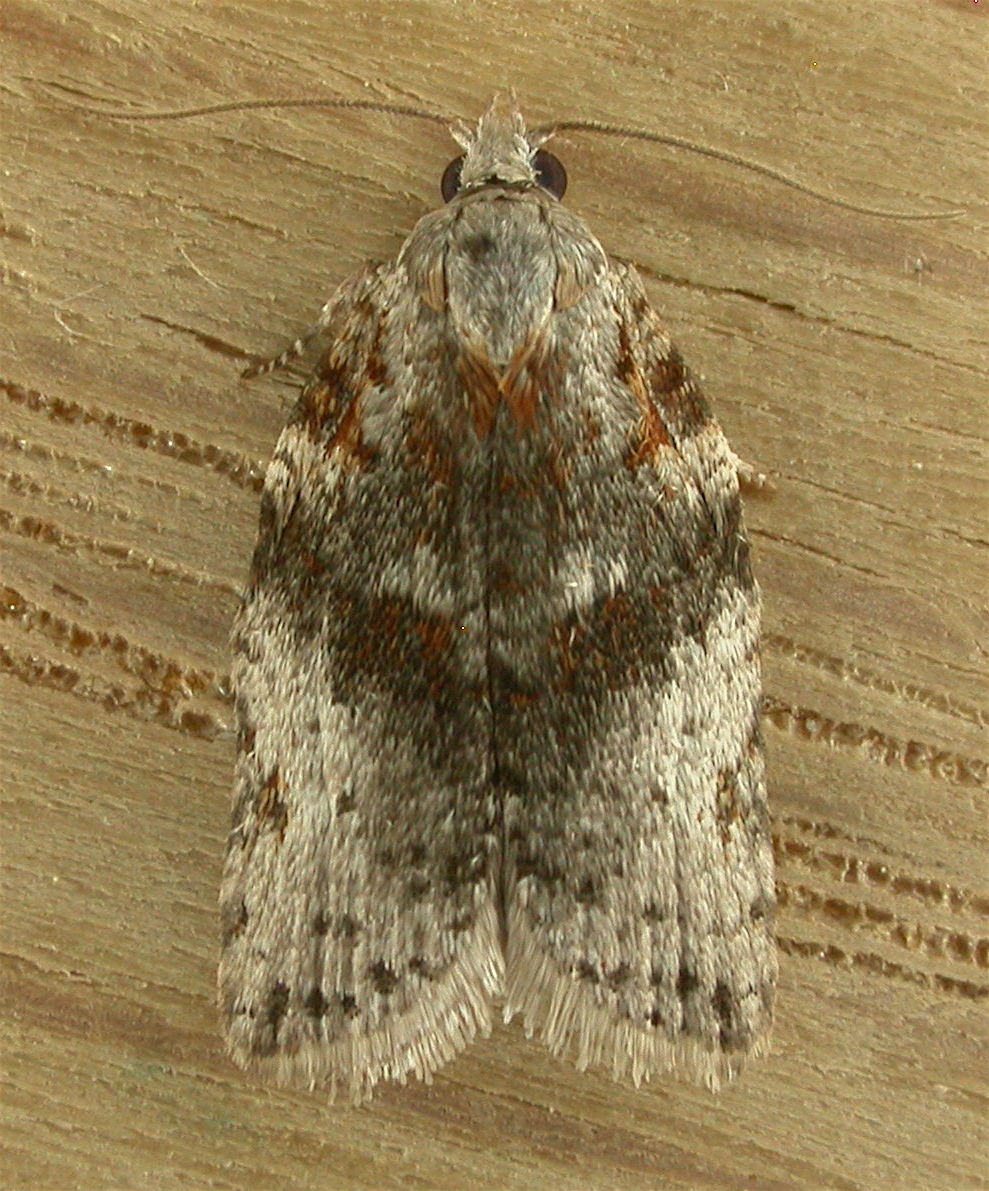

Scientific classification
- Kingdom: Animalia
- Phylum: Arthropoda
- Class: Insecta
- Order: Lepidoptera
- Family: Tortricidae
- Genus: Isotenes
- Species: I. miserana

Binomial name
- Isotenes miserana (Walker, 1863)

Synonyms
- Teras miserana Walker, 1863; Teras absumptana Walker, 1866

= Isotenes miserana =

Species of moth

Isotenes miserana (orange fruit borer (Note: also spelled 'fruitborer')) is a species of moth of the family Tortricidae. It is found in the Northern Territory, Queensland, New South Wales and Victoria. This species has been introduced to New Zealand.

The wingspan is about 20 mm.

The larvae are considered a pest for flowers and fruit of a wide variety of agricultural plants and fruit trees, including Citrus sinensis, Persea americana, Macadamia integrifolia, Litchi chinensis, Vitis vinifera and Morus species.
