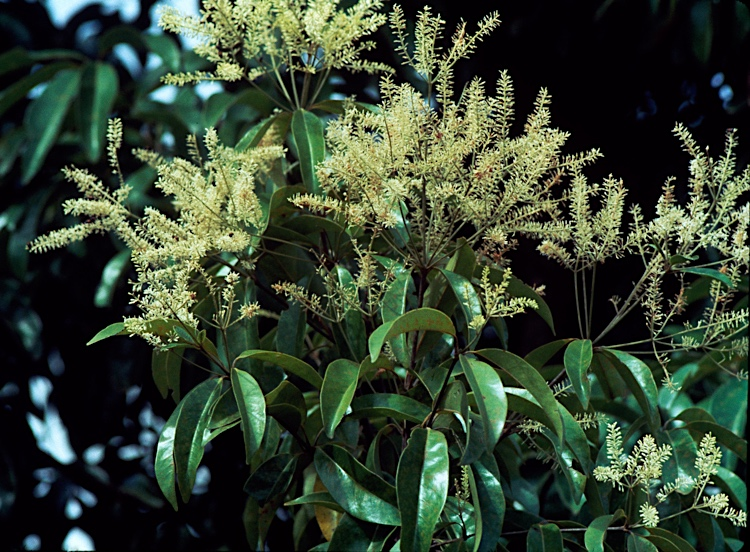
- Foliage and flowers

Conservation status
- Least Concern (NCA)

Scientific classification
- Kingdom: Plantae
- Clade: Tracheophytes
- Clade: Angiosperms
- Clade: Eudicots
- Order: Proteales
- Family: Proteaceae
- Genus: Lasjia
- Species: L. whelanii

Binomial name
- Lasjia whelanii (F.M.Bailey) P.H.Weston & A.R.Mast

Synonyms
- Helicia whelanii F.M.Bailey; Macadamia whelanii (F.M.Bailey) F.M.Bailey

= Lasjia whelanii =

Species of plant endemic to Australia

Lasjia whelanii, also known as Whelan's silky oak, Whelan's nut oak or Whelan's macadamia, is a species of large forest tree in the protea and waratah family Proteaceae that is endemic to north-eastern Queensland, Australia.

== History ==
The tree was first described in 1889 by Queensland's colonial botanist Frederick Manson Bailey as a species of Helicia, which in 1901 he moved to Macadamia, but was transferred in 2008, in a paper in the American Journal of Botany by Peter Weston and Austin Mast, to the new genus Lasjia.

== Description ==
The dark green leaves grow up to 21 cm (8.3 in) long by 6 cm (2.4 in) wide, with four or five leaves in each whorl. The white flowers grow as inflorescences. The globular fruits are about 5 cm (2.0 in) in diameter, with the seeds strongly cyanogenetic (cyanide producing) and poisonous to humans. It produces a useful timber, suitable for construction work.

== Distribution and habitat ==
The species occurs in the Wet Tropics of Queensland, in well-developed lowland tropical rainforest, from near sea level to an altitude of 650 m (2,130 ft).
