= Isotenes melanoclera =

Scientific classification
- Kingdom: Animalia
- Phylum: Arthropoda
- Class: Insecta
- Order: Lepidoptera
- Family: Tortricidae
- Genus: Isotenes
- Species: I. melanoclera

Binomial name
- Isotenes melanoclera Meyrick, 1938

Species of moth

Isotenes melanoclera is a species of moth of the family Tortricidae. It is found on New Guinea.
