= Isotenes rhodosphena =

Scientific classification
- Domain: Eukaryota
- Kingdom: Animalia
- Phylum: Arthropoda
- Class: Insecta
- Order: Lepidoptera
- Family: Tortricidae
- Genus: Isotenes
- Species: I. rhodosphena

Binomial name
- Isotenes rhodosphena Diakonoff, 1952

Species of moth

Isotenes rhodosphena is a species of moth of the family Tortricidae. It is found on New Guinea.
