= Isotenes thaumasia =

Scientific classification
- Domain: Eukaryota
- Kingdom: Animalia
- Phylum: Arthropoda
- Class: Insecta
- Order: Lepidoptera
- Family: Tortricidae
- Genus: Isotenes
- Species: I. thaumasia

Binomial name
- Isotenes thaumasia Diakonoff, 1948

Species of moth

Isotenes thaumasia is a species of moth of the family Tortricidae. It is found on Java in Indonesia.
