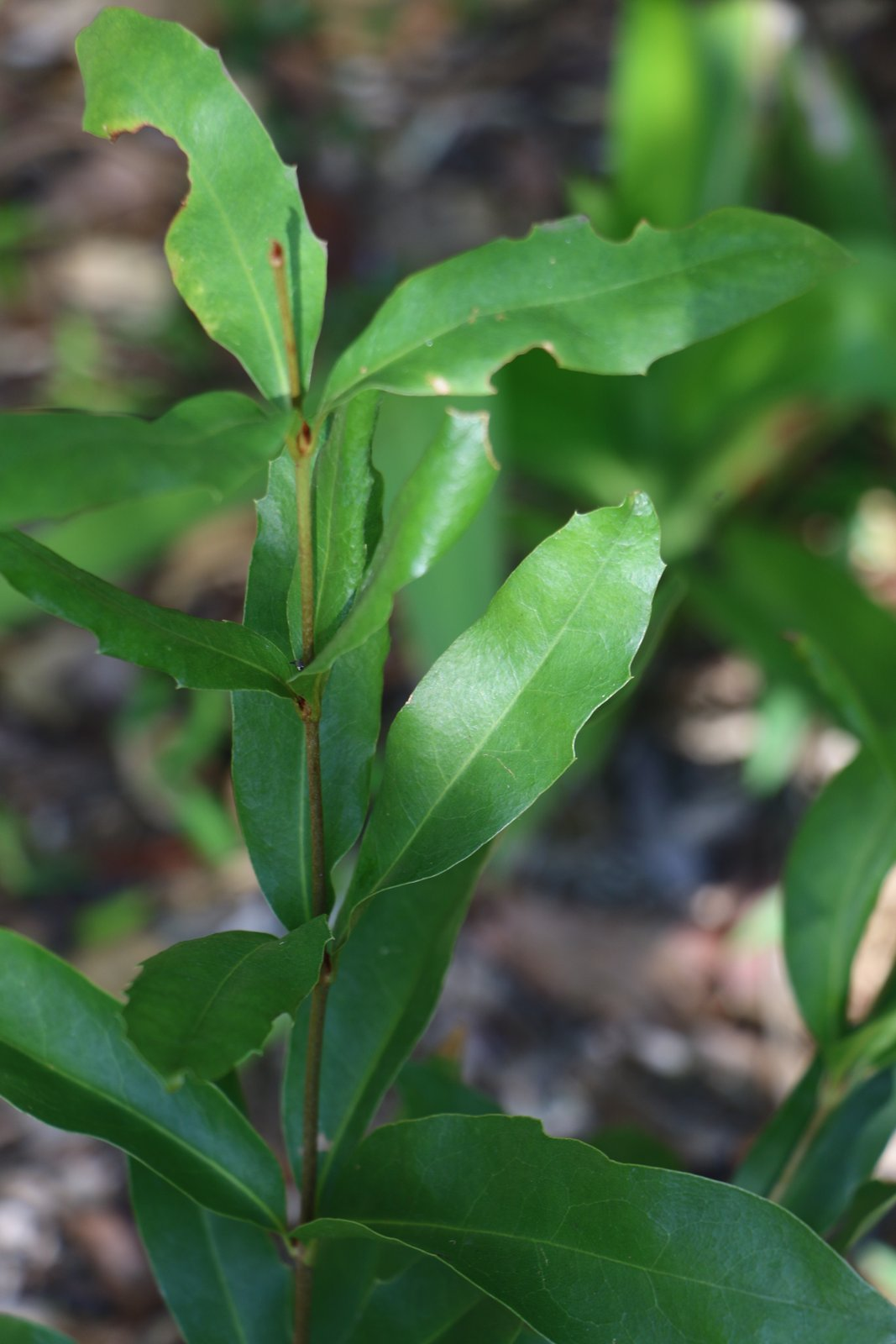

Scientific classification
- Kingdom: Plantae
- Clade: Tracheophytes
- Clade: Angiosperms
- Clade: Eudicots
- Order: Proteales
- Family: Proteaceae
- Genus: Macadamia
- Species: M. jansenii

Binomial name
- Macadamia jansenii C.L.Gross & P.H.Weston

= Macadamia jansenii =

Species of tree native to Queensland, Australia

Macadamia jansenii is an endangered and poisonous tree in the flowering plant family Proteaceae, native to Queensland in Australia. It was only described as a new species in 1991, being first brought to the attention of plant scientists in 1983 by Ray Jansen, a sugarcane farmer and amateur botanist from South Kolan in Central Queensland. Closely related to the cultivated and recently domesticated macadamia nut, it has small 11–16 mm diameter nuts that have a smooth, hard, brown shell enclosing a cream, globulose kernel that is bitter and inedible. In the wild it grows as a multi-stemmed 6–9 m (20–30 ft) tall evergreen tree, with leaves having entire margins and generally in whorls of 3. An extremely rare species, it was discovered as a single population of around 60 plants in the wild in Eastern Australia. In 2018 about 60 new mature Macadamia jansenii trees were located, although a quarter of these were destroyed in the bush fires of 2019.

Sequencing of the genome was carried out, as knowing the genotype of wild crop relatives is critical to diversification of crop genetics to ensure food security, producing a 751 Mb reference genome assembled to 14 chromosomes. This is a potential model to study the diversity of a whole species, helping understand the impact of small population size and the associated genetic bottlenecks. Currently there are only around 100 known trees in existence in the wild, all growing in Bulburin National Park, near Miriam Vale in Queensland, although an insurance population propagated from cuttings has been established at the Tondoon Botanic Gardens, near Gladstone.

== See also ==
- Macadamia nuts
