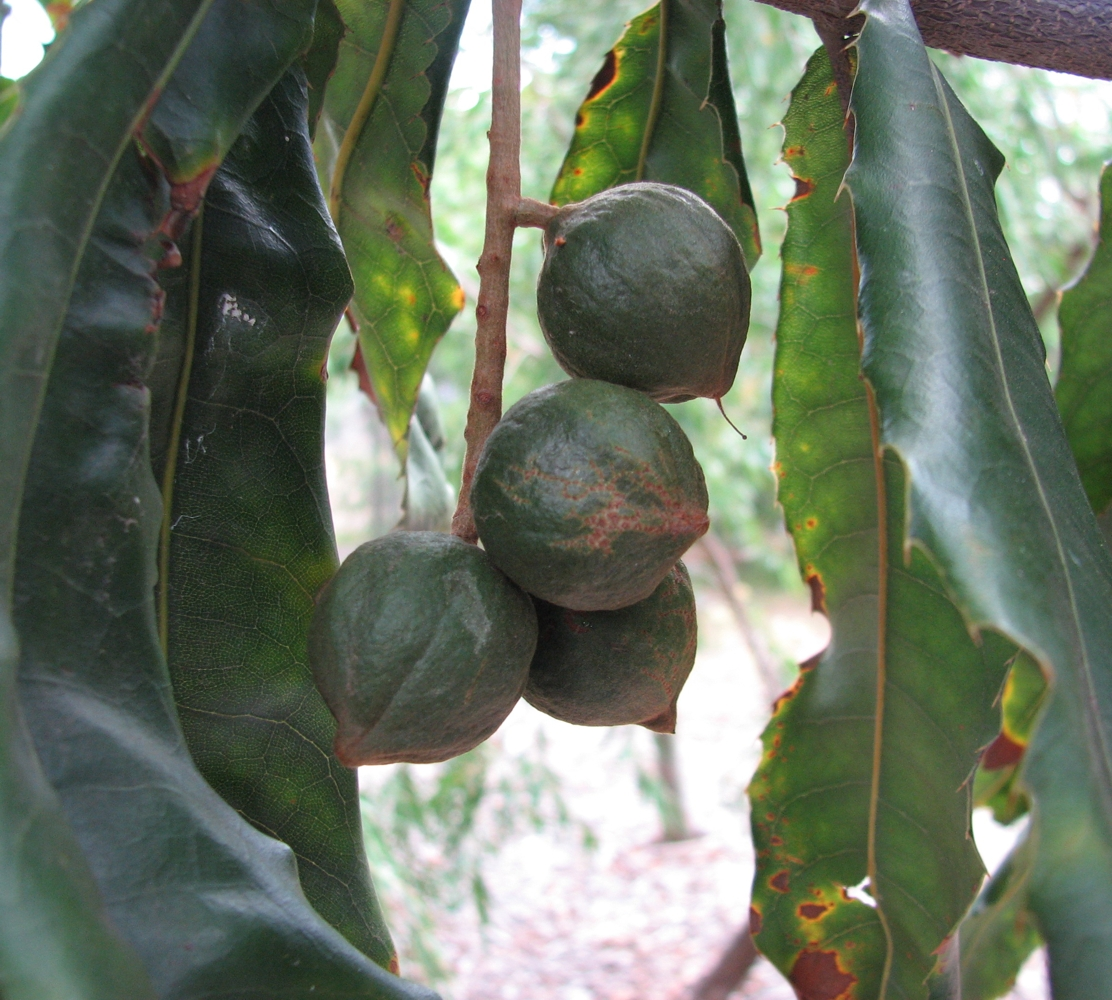
- Foliage and fruits

Conservation status
- Endangered (IUCN 3.1)

Scientific classification
- Kingdom: Plantae
- Clade: Embryophytes
- Clade: Tracheophytes
- Clade: Spermatophytes
- Clade: Angiosperms
- Clade: Eudicots
- Order: Proteales
- Family: Proteaceae
- Genus: Macadamia
- Species: M. tetraphylla

Binomial name
- Macadamia tetraphylla L.A.S.Johnson

= Macadamia tetraphylla =

Species of tree native to Australia

Macadamia tetraphylla is a tree species in the family Proteaceae native to Australia. Common names include macadamia nut, bauple nut, prickly macadamia, Queensland nut, rough-shelled bush nut and rough-shelled Queensland nut.

== Description ==
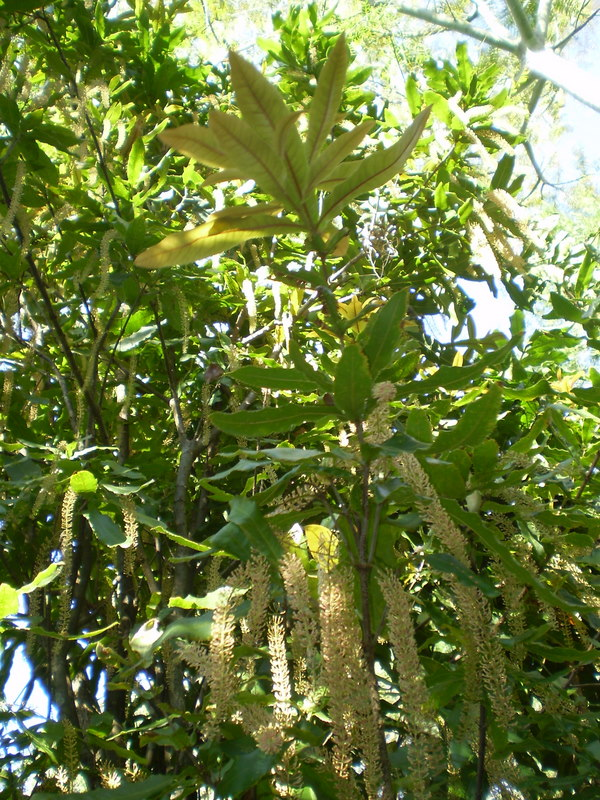
Flower and branch

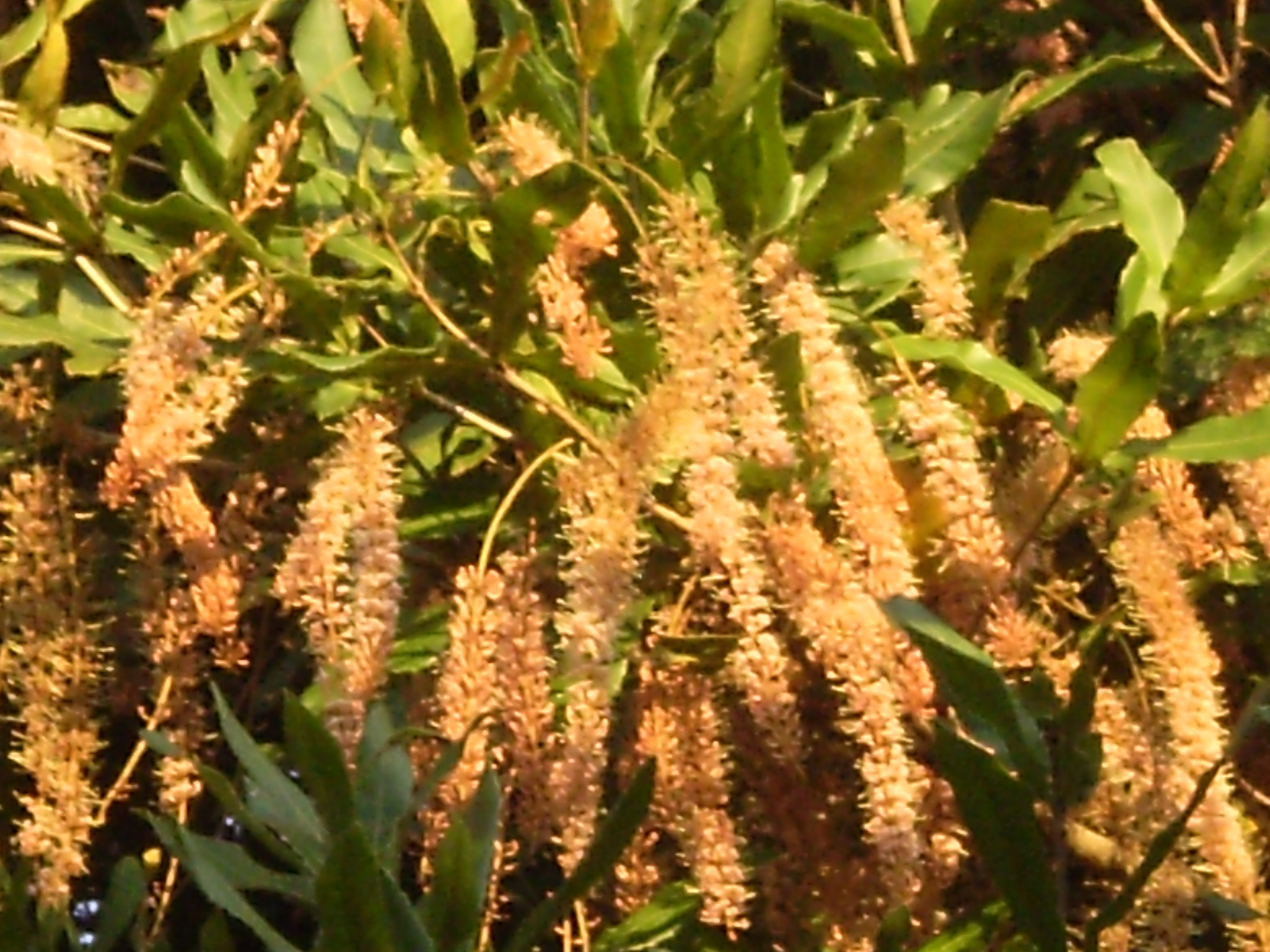
Pink flowers

The species has dense foliage and grows up to 18 metres (59 ft) in height. The leaves have toothed margins and are 7 to 25 centimetres (3 to 10 in) long. As the species name tetraphylla implies, it usually has four leaves more or less equally spaced around each leaf node, whereas the other main commercial species, Macadamia integrifolia, has a variable leaf number but usually three. It has long, pendant white to creamy pink to purple flowers, followed by woody, rounded fruits which are 2 to 3 cm (3/4 to 1 1/4 in) in diameter and contain edible seeds. As one common name implies, the shell of this species is often dimpled or "rough shelled" as compared to the integrifolia, which has a smooth shell and white flowers.

== Distribution ==
Macadamia tetraphylla is native to southern Queensland and northern New South Wales in Australia.

== Cultivation ==
=== Production ===
It has been introduced to Mexico where it has done well in the states of Michoacán and Jalisco and has become an important export crop.

Hawaii is the largest exporter of this crop worldwide.

Both species of macadamia have not done well in the pure tropics, with no fully successful plantations less than 15 degrees from the equator. Major plantations in Costa Rica, at 10 degrees north, are said to produce much less than in Hawaii at 19 to 22 degrees north, in one case 20% the production. Plantations in Guatemala at 15 degrees north are successful. However, individual seedling trees have produced well in the pure tropics and need to be selected. One grower noted that M. integrifolia flowers in Costa Rica have no aroma, leading to low and erratic pollination.

=== Sugar content ===
The species has a higher sugar content than M. integrifolia, leading to problems of burning when baked in cookies and other desserts, thus most commercial macadamias are from M. integrifolia to assure conformity of roasting and baking results. Many M. tetraphylla or hybrids of tetraphylla and integrifolia are grown in home orchards. The higher sugar content of M. tetraphylla is preferred by some, especially for eating raw.

=== First modern Australian native food crop ===
Macadamia tetraphylla was the first Australian native food plant to be grown by non-indigenous Australians as a commercial crop. The first commercial plantation of macadamia trees were planted in the early 1880s by Charles Staff at Rous Mill, 12 km southeast of Lismore, New South Wales, consisting of M. tetraphylla. Seedlings from the original plantation were used as rootstock for grafted modern varieties well into the 20th century. This original plantation was finally cleared and replaced with grafted modern varieties in the 1990s.

Ironically, even as the macadamia has spread worldwide in commercial agriculture, it is now listed as a vulnerable species in its native Australia due to habitat loss and degradation. The loss and impoverishment of its habitat has resulted from clearance of lowland rainforest for agriculture and urban development; invasive weeds; and poorly-designed fire management systems.

== Nutrition ==
Like many other nuts, as well as olives, macadamia nuts are high in monounsaturated fatty acids (containing approximately 86%). Monounsaturated fatty acids have been linked to reduced cholesterol in the blood.

In 2017, the U.S. Food and Drug Administration (FDA) approved the following "qualified" health claim for manufacturers of macadamia products to cite, acknowledging that it was not an "authorized" FDA health claim (normally backed by widespread scientific consensus):

Supportive but not conclusive research shows that eating 1.5 ounces per day of macadamia nuts, as part of a diet low in saturated fat and cholesterol and not resulting in increased intake of saturated fat or calories may reduce the risk of coronary heart disease.
