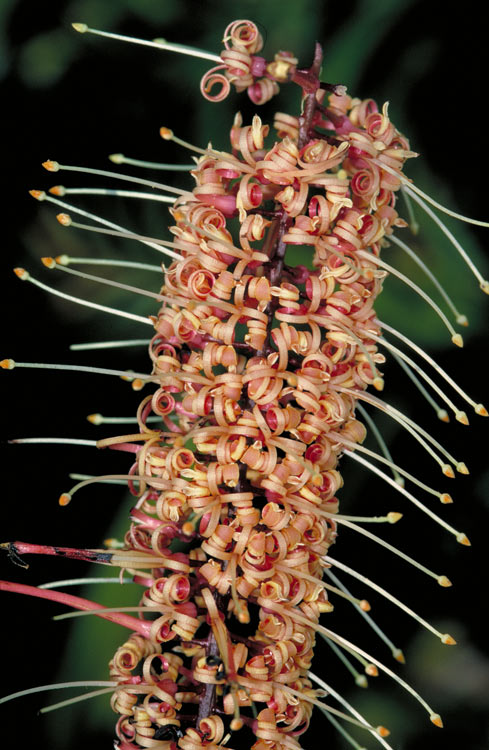
- Inflorescence

Conservation status
- Least Concern (NCA)
- Least Concern (IUCN 3.1)

Scientific classification
- Kingdom: Plantae
- Clade: Tracheophytes
- Clade: Angiosperms
- Clade: Eudicots
- Order: Proteales
- Family: Proteaceae
- Subfamily: Grevilleoideae
- Tribe: Macadamieae
- Subtribe: Malagasiinae
- Genus: Catalepidia; P.H.Weston
- Species: C. heyana

Binomial name
- Catalepidia heyana (F.M.Bailey) P.H.Weston

Synonyms
- Helicia heyana F.M.Bailey Macadamia heyana (F.M.Bailey) Sleumer

= Catalepidia =

Genus of plants endemic to Australia

Catalepidia is a monotypic genus in the family Proteaceae which is endemic to Queensland, Australia. The sole described species is Catalepidia heyana, commonly known as Hey's nut oak. It is a medium sized tree growing up to about 18 m (59 ft) tall, and is found only in upland rainforest above 600 m (2,000 ft) on granite soils, ranging from the Windsor Tableland to the Atherton Tableland.

== Taxonomy ==
The species was first formally described by Frederick Manson Bailey, and published in 1901 in his book "The Queensland Flora". His description was based on plant material collected by himself in 1889 from Palm Camp on Mount Bellenden Ker. Bailey placed the new species in the genus Helicia, and named it Helicia heyana. In 1955 the species was transferred to the genus Macadamia by Dutch botanist Hermann Otto Sleumer and finally to the newly erected genus Catalepidia by Peter Henry Weston in 1995.

=== Etymology ===
The genus name Catalepidia was coined by Weston from the Greek words katá (low) and lepís (a scale), which refers to the cataphylls at the base of the shoots. The species epithet heyana was given in honour of Reverend Nicholas Hey of Mapoon.

== Conservation ==
This species has been assessed as least concern by both the Queensland Government Department of Environment and Science, and the International Union for Conservation of Nature. The IUCN states the reason for their least concern assessment is "the overall population is generally stable, and it is not suspected to be threatened by any major threat".
