= Lasjia erecta =

Scientific classification
- Kingdom: Plantae
- Clade: Tracheophytes
- Clade: Angiosperms
- Clade: Eudicots
- Order: Proteales
- Family: Proteaceae
- Genus: Lasjia
- Species: L. erecta

Binomial name
- Lasjia erecta (J.A.McDonald & R.Ismail) P.H.Weston & A.R.Mast, 2008

Synonyms
- Macadamia erecta J.A.McDonald & R.Ismail, 1995

Species of plant endemic to Indonesia

Lasjia erecta is a species of forest tree in the protea family that is endemic to the island of Sulawesi, Indonesia. Its closest relative is Lasjia hildebrandii, also a Sulawesi endemic.

== History ==
The tree was first described in 1995 as a species of Macadamia, but was transferred in 2008, in a paper in the American Journal of Botany by Peter Weston and Austin Mast, to the new genus Lasjia.

== Description ==
The species grows to about 14 m (46 ft) height, with a straight trunk up to 70 cm (28 in) in diameter. The leaves are consistently 4-whorled, 4–9 cm (1.6–3.5 in) long by 1.5–4.2 cm (0.6–1.7 in) wide. The creamy-green flowers appear in erect terminal inflorescences. The round fruits are 2.5–3 cm (1.0–1.2 in) in diameter.

== Distribution and habitat ==
The species has been recorded from the province of Southeast Sulawesi, including the adjacent island of Kabaena, as well as from Lore Lindu National Park in Central Sulawesi. It grows on ultramafic soils at altitudes of 900–1,700 m (3,000–5,600 ft).
