= Isotenes ornata =

Scientific classification
- Domain: Eukaryota
- Kingdom: Animalia
- Phylum: Arthropoda
- Class: Insecta
- Order: Lepidoptera
- Family: Tortricidae
- Genus: Isotenes
- Species: I. ornata

Binomial name
- Isotenes ornata Diakonoff, 1952

Species of moth

Isotenes ornata is a species of moth of the family Tortricidae. It is found in Papua New Guinea.
