= Isotenes crobylota =

Scientific classification
- Kingdom: Animalia
- Phylum: Arthropoda
- Class: Insecta
- Order: Lepidoptera
- Family: Tortricidae
- Genus: Isotenes
- Species: I. crobylota

Binomial name
- Isotenes crobylota (Meyrick, 1910)

Synonyms
- Harmologa crobylota Meyrick, 1910

Species of moth

Isotenes crobylota is a species of moth of the family Tortricidae. It is found on New Guinea.
