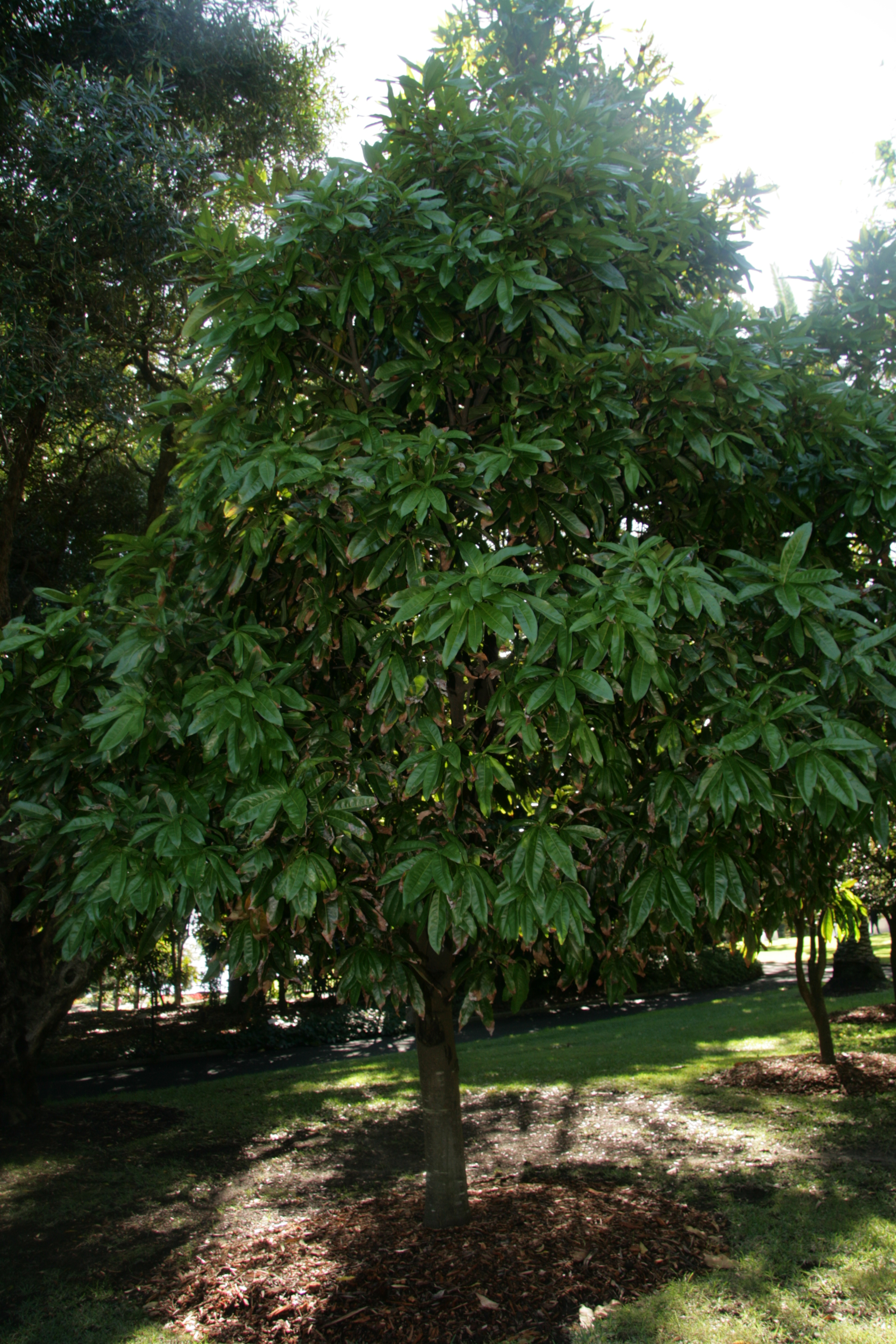
- In the Royal Botanic Garden, Sydney

Scientific classification
- Kingdom: Plantae
- Clade: Tracheophytes
- Clade: Angiosperms
- Clade: Eudicots
- Order: Proteales
- Family: Proteaceae
- Genus: Lasjia
- Species: L. grandis

Binomial name
- Lasjia grandis (C.L.Gross & B.Hyland) P.H.Weston & A.R.Mast, 2008

Synonyms
- Macadamia grandis C.L.Gross & B.Hyland, 1993

= Lasjia grandis =

Species of plant endemic to Australia

Lasjia grandis, also known as the satin silky oak or Barong nut, is a species of forest tree in the protea family that is endemic to north-eastern Queensland, Australia. Its conservation status is considered to be Vulnerable under Queensland's Nature Conservation Act 1992.

== History ==
The tree was first described in 1993 in the journal Australian Systematic Botany by Caroline Gross and Bernard Hyland as a species of Macadamia, but was transferred in 2008 in the American Journal of Botany by Peter Weston and Austin Mast to the new genus Lasjia.

== Description ==
The leaves are 8–23 cm (3.1–9.1 in) long by 2–6 cm (0.8–2.4 in) wide. The terminal buds are covered in rust-brown coloured hairs. The cream to yellow flowers grow as inflorescences with curved bracts. The globular fruits are 5–6 cm (2.0–2.4 in) in diameter.

== Distribution and habitat ==
The species occurs in lowland tropical rainforest in the China Camp (Bloomfield) region from near sea level to an altitude of 450 m.
