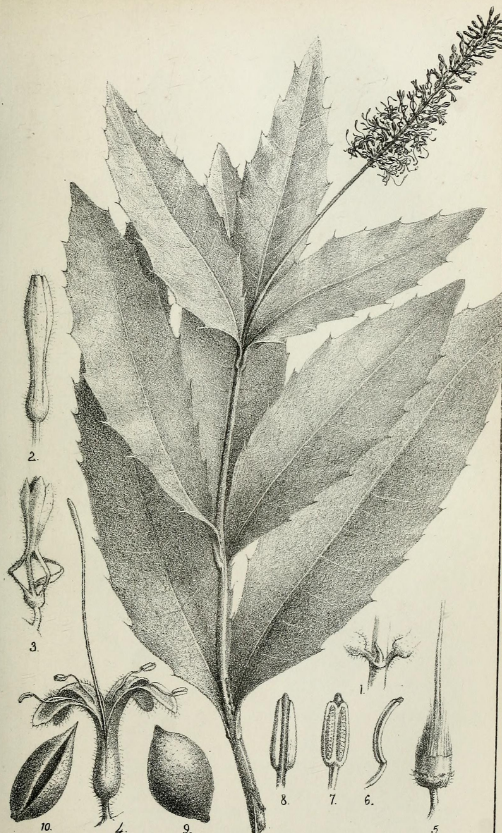
- Artist L. Becker
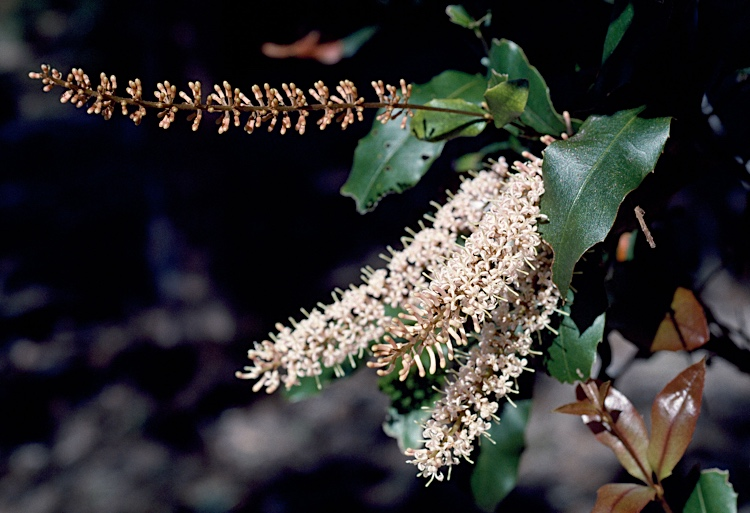
- Foliage and flowers

Conservation status
- Endangered (IUCN 3.1)

Scientific classification
- Kingdom: Plantae
- Clade: Tracheophytes
- Clade: Angiosperms
- Clade: Eudicots
- Order: Proteales
- Family: Proteaceae
- Genus: Macadamia
- Species: M. ternifolia

Binomial name
- Macadamia ternifolia F.Muell.

Synonyms
- Helicia ternifolia F.Muell. Macadamia ternifolia F.Muell. var. ternifolia Macadamia ternifolia var. typica Domin nom. inval. Macadamia minor F.M.Bailey; Macadamia lowii F.M.Bailey

= Macadamia ternifolia =

Species of tree

Macadamia ternifolia (common names: small-fruited Queensland nut, gympie nut) is a tree in the flowering plant family Proteaceae, native to Queensland in Australia, and is listed as vulnerable under the EPBC Act.

Macadamia ternifolia is a small multi-stemmed tree which grows up to 8 m tall. The narrowly ovate adult leaves are in whorls of three on a stalk which is 4–10 mm long. Each leaf is 9–12.5 cm long, 2–3.5 cm wide and is dull above and paler below. They are stiff, smooth and leathery, with slightly undulating margins and points at the tip. The midrib is prominent below, and slightly sunken above. Inflorescence is simple on a stem 5–18 cm long, with pink tepals 6–8.5 mm long, and filaments 4–7 mm long which are joined to the tepals for 0.5–6 mm and anthers 1–2 mm long. The ovaries 0.4–1 mm long and the style 5–10 mm long, and give rise to fruit which is 14–22 mm long and 13–22 mm wide. The seeds are globose to broadly ovoid and about 16 mm long and 12 mm wide and have a smooth shell about 1 mm thick.

== See also ==
- Macadamia nuts
