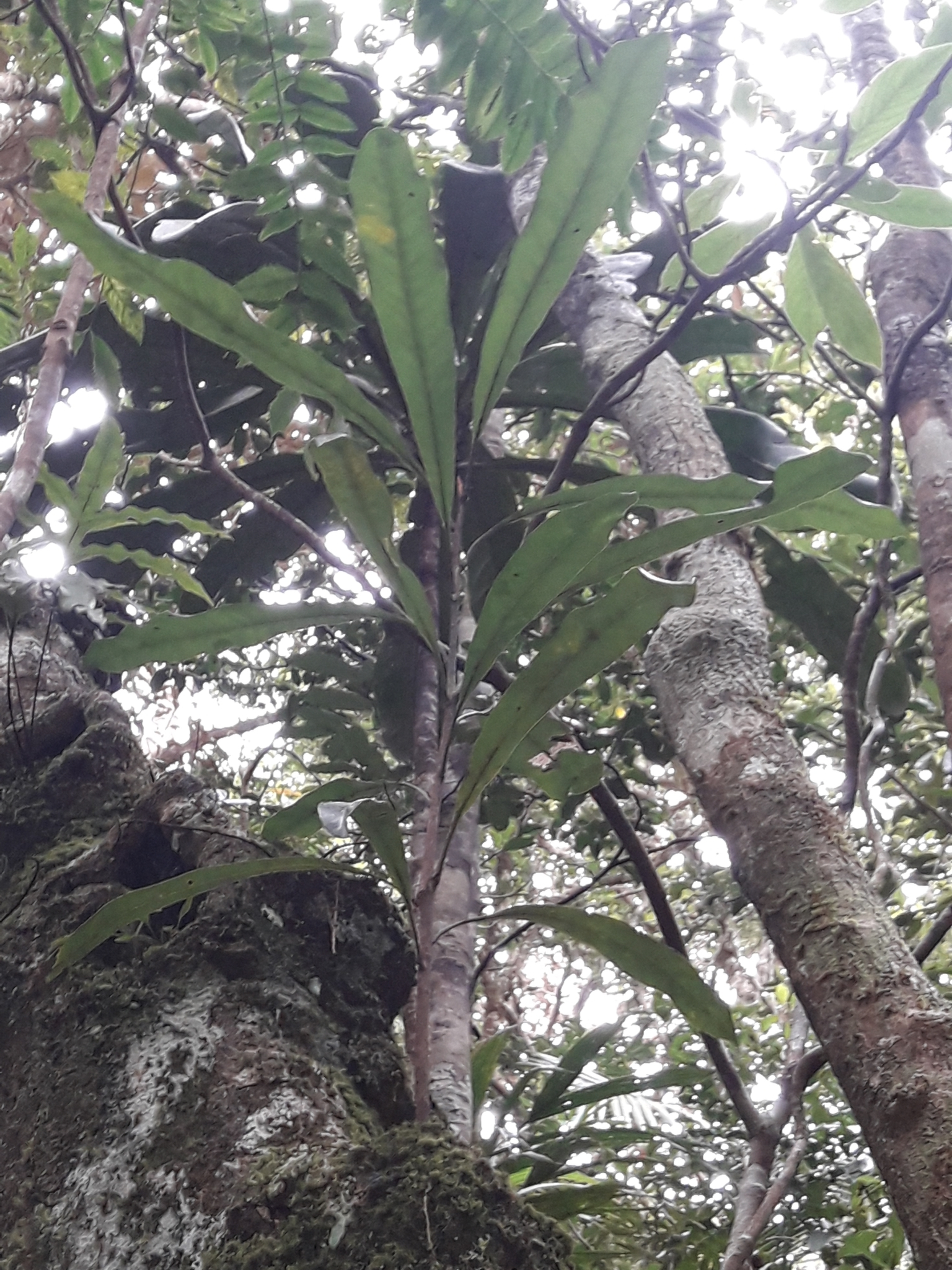
- Virotia francii

Scientific classification
- Kingdom: Plantae
- Clade: Tracheophytes
- Clade: Angiosperms
- Clade: Eudicots
- Order: Proteales
- Family: Proteaceae
- Subfamily: Grevilleoideae
- Tribe: Macadamieae
- Subtribe: Virotiinae
- Genus: Virotia; L.A.S.Johnson & B.G.Briggs

= Virotia =

Genus of plants endemic to New Caledonia

Virotia is a genus of six species of flowering plants in the family Proteaceae. The genus is endemic to New Caledonia with six species that were once placed in Macadamia. Its closest relatives are the Australian Athertonia and the Asian Heliciopsis. The genus is named after Robert Virot, pioneer of ecological studies in New Caledonia and author of a monograph of New Caledonian Proteaceae.

== Species ==
- Virotia angustifolia (Virot) P.H.Weston & A.R.Mast (basionym: Macadamia angustifolia Virot)
- Virotia francii (Guillaumin) P.H.Weston & A.R.Mast (basionym: Roupala francii Guillaumin)
- Virotia leptophylla (Guillaumin) L.A.S.Johnson & B.G.Briggs (basionym: Kermadecia leptophylla Guillaumin)
- Virotia neurophylla (Guillaumin) P.H.Weston & A.R.Mast (basionym: Kermadecia neurophylla Guillaumin)
- Virotia rousselii (Vieill.) P.H.Weston & A.R.Mast (basionym: Roupala rousselii Vieill)
- Virotia vieillardi (Brongn. & Gris) P.H.Weston & A.R.Mast (basionym: Roupala vieillardii Brongn. & Gris)
