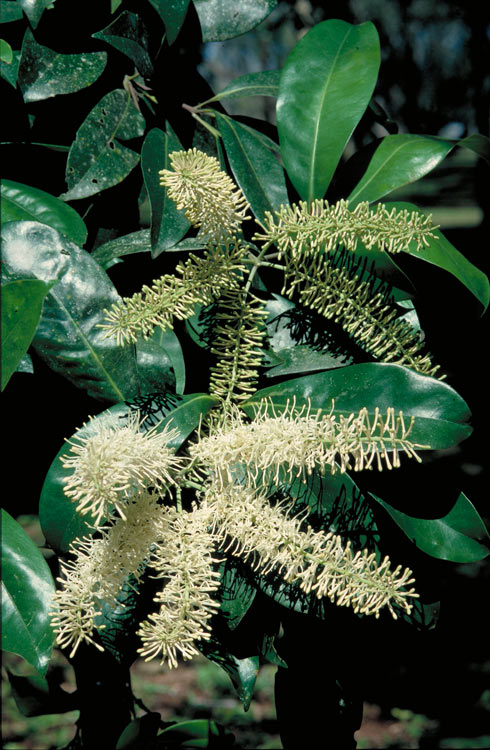

Conservation status
- Vulnerable (EPBC Act)

Scientific classification
- Kingdom: Plantae
- Clade: Tracheophytes
- Clade: Angiosperms
- Clade: Eudicots
- Order: Proteales
- Family: Proteaceae
- Genus: Lasjia
- Species: L. claudiensis

Binomial name
- Lasjia claudiensis (C.L.Gross & B.Hyland) P.H.Weston & A.R.Mast, 2008

Synonyms
- Macadamia claudiensis C.L.Gross & B.Hyland, 1993

= Lasjia claudiensis =

Species of plant endemic to Australia

Lasjia claudiensis is a species of tree in the protea family that is endemic to the Cape York Peninsula of Far North Queensland in north-eastern Australia. It is listed as Vulnerable under Queensland's Nature Conservation Act 1992 as well as Australia's Environment Protection and Biodiversity Conservation Act 1999.

== History ==
The tree was first described in 1993 in the journal Australian Systematic Botany by Caroline Gross and Bernard Hyland as a species of Macadamia, but was transferred in 2008 in the American Journal of Botany by Peter Weston and Austin Mast to the new genus Lasjia, of which it is the type species.

== Description ==
The thick, leathery leaves are 11.5–26 cm (4.5–10.2 in) long by 4–13.5 cm (1.6–5.3 in) wide. The terminal buds and young shoots are covered in rust-brown coloured hairs. The flowers grow as inflorescences with curved bracts. The globular fruits are 5–7 cm (2.0–2.8 in) in diameter.

== Distribution and habitat ==
The species occurs in monsoon forest and gallery forest on the Cape York Peninsula from near sea level to an altitude of 100 m (330 ft).
