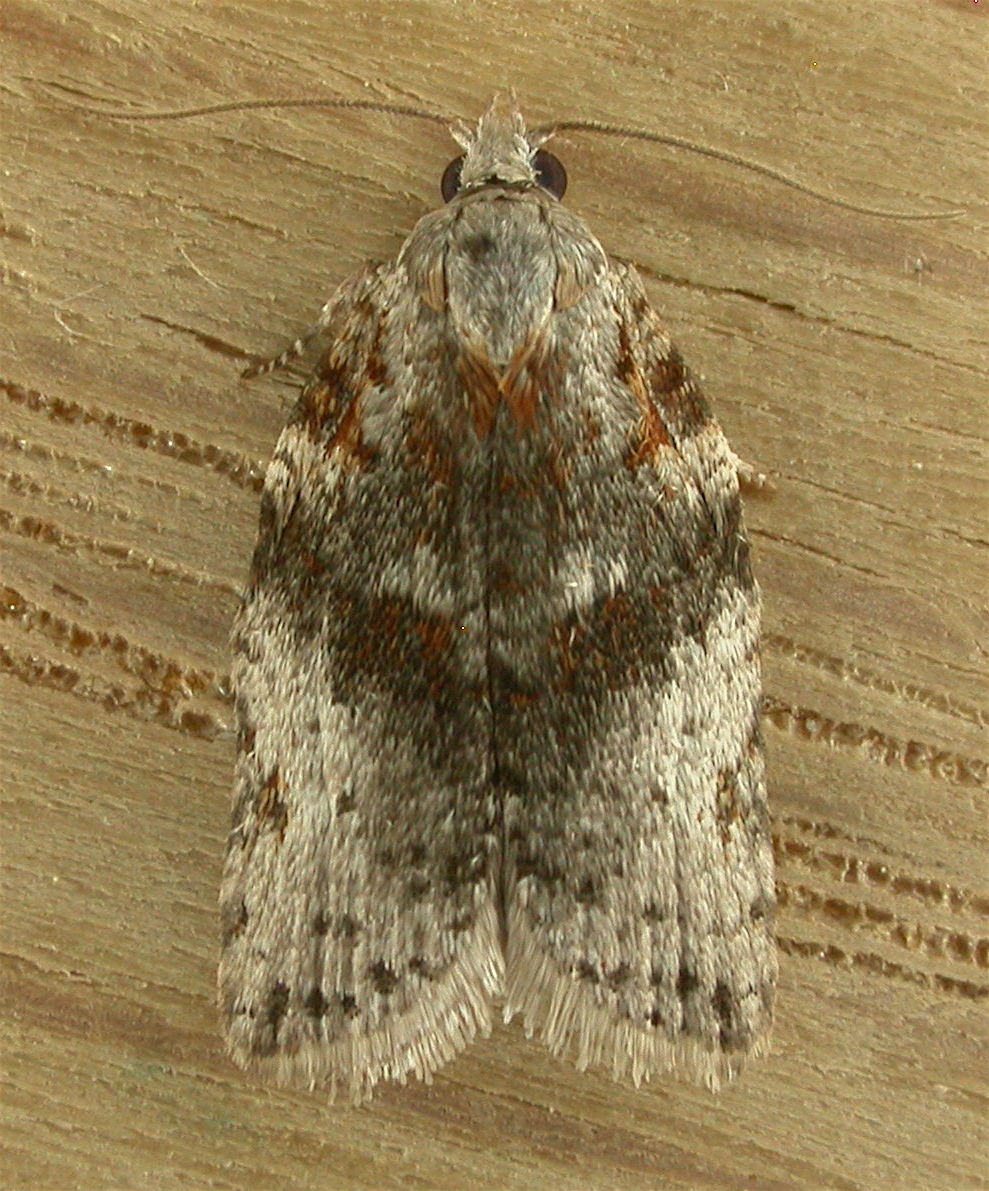
- Isotenes miserana

Scientific classification
- Domain: Eukaryota
- Kingdom: Animalia
- Phylum: Arthropoda
- Class: Insecta
- Order: Lepidoptera
- Family: Tortricidae
- Tribe: Archipini
- Genus: Isotenes; Meyrick, 1938

Species
- See text

Synonyms
- Piliscophora Diakonoff, 1939

= Isotenes =

Genus of tortrix moths

Isotenes is a genus of moths belonging to the family Tortricidae.

== Species ==
- Isotenes anisa Diakonoff, 1983
- Isotenes athliopa (Meyrick, 1938)
- Isotenes clarisecta Diakonoff, 1952
- Isotenes crobylota (Meyrick, 1910)
- Isotenes cryptadia Diakonoff, 1948
- Isotenes epiperca Diakonoff, 1944
- Isotenes erasa Diakonoff, 1952
- Isotenes eurymenes (Meyrick, 1930)
- Isotenes inae Diakonoff, 1948
- Isotenes latitata Razowski, 2013
- Isotenes marmorata Diakonoff, 1952
- Isotenes megalea Diakonoff, 1952
- Isotenes melanoclera Meyrick, 1938
- Isotenes melanopa Diakonoff, 1952
- Isotenes melanotes Diakonoff, 1952
- Isotenes mesonephela Diakonoff, 1952
- Isotenes miserana (Walker, 1863)
- Isotenes ornata Diakonoff, 1952
- Isotenes prosantes Diakonoff, 1952
- Isotenes pudens Diakonoff, 1952
- Isotenes punctosa Diakonoff, 1952
- Isotenes rhodosphena Diakonoff, 1952
- Isotenes sematophora Diakonoff, 1952
- Isotenes syndesma Razowski, 2013
- Isotenes tetrops (Diakonoff, 1944)
- Isotenes thaumasia Diakonoff, 1948
