= Isotenes eurymenes =

Scientific classification
- Kingdom: Animalia
- Phylum: Arthropoda
- Class: Insecta
- Order: Lepidoptera
- Family: Tortricidae
- Genus: Isotenes
- Species: I. eurymenes

Binomial name
- Isotenes eurymenes (Meyrick, 1930)

Synonyms
- Tortrix eurymenes Meyrick, 1930

Species of moth

Isotenes eurymenes is a species of moth of the family Tortricidae. It is found in Papua, Indonesia, on New Guinea.
