= Isotenes cryptadia =

Scientific classification
- Domain: Eukaryota
- Kingdom: Animalia
- Phylum: Arthropoda
- Class: Insecta
- Order: Lepidoptera
- Family: Tortricidae
- Genus: Isotenes
- Species: I. cryptadia

Binomial name
- Isotenes cryptadia Diakonoff, 1948

Species of moth

Isotenes cryptadia is a species of moth of the family Tortricidae. It is found on the Maluku Islands of Indonesia.
