= Lasjia hildebrandii =

Scientific classification
- Kingdom: Plantae
- Clade: Tracheophytes
- Clade: Angiosperms
- Clade: Eudicots
- Order: Proteales
- Family: Proteaceae
- Genus: Lasjia
- Species: L. hildebrandii

Binomial name
- Lasjia hildebrandii (Steenis) P.H.Weston & A.R.Mast, 2008

Synonyms
- Macadamia hildebrandii Steenis, 1952

Species of plant endemic to Indonesia

Lasjia hildebrandii, also known as Celebes nut, Sulawesi nut, Sulawesi macadamia or Hildebrand's macadamia, is a species of forest tree in the protea family that is endemic to the island of Sulawesi, Indonesia. Its closest relative is Lasjia erecta, also a Sulawesi endemic.

== History ==
The tree was first described in 1952 by Dutch botanist Van Steenis as a species of Macadamia, but was transferred in 2008, in a paper in the American Journal of Botany by Peter Weston and Austin Mast, to the new genus Lasjia.

== Description ==
The species grows to about 14 m (46 ft) in height by 10 m (33 ft) across. It produces edible nuts.

== Distribution and habitat ==
The species occurs on the large Wallacean island of Sulawesi (formerly Celebes) in Indonesia, on well-drained soils in or near lowland tropical rainforest.
