= Isotenes inae =

Scientific classification
- Domain: Eukaryota
- Kingdom: Animalia
- Phylum: Arthropoda
- Class: Insecta
- Order: Lepidoptera
- Family: Tortricidae
- Genus: Isotenes
- Species: I. inae

Binomial name
- Isotenes inae Diakonoff, 1948

Species of moth

Isotenes inae is a moth of the family Tortricidae first described by Alexey Diakonoff in 1948. It is found in Nepal, India, Thailand, Vietnam, Taiwan and Indonesia (Sumatra, Java, Sulawesi and Seram). The habitat consists of lower and upper montane forests.
