= Isotenes athliopa =

Scientific classification
- Kingdom: Animalia
- Phylum: Arthropoda
- Class: Insecta
- Order: Lepidoptera
- Family: Tortricidae
- Genus: Isotenes
- Species: I. athliopa

Binomial name
- Isotenes athliopa (Meyrick, 1938)

Synonyms
- Harmologa athliopa Meyrick, 1938

Species of moth

Isotenes athliopa is a species of moth of the family Tortricidae. It is found in Papua New Guinea.
