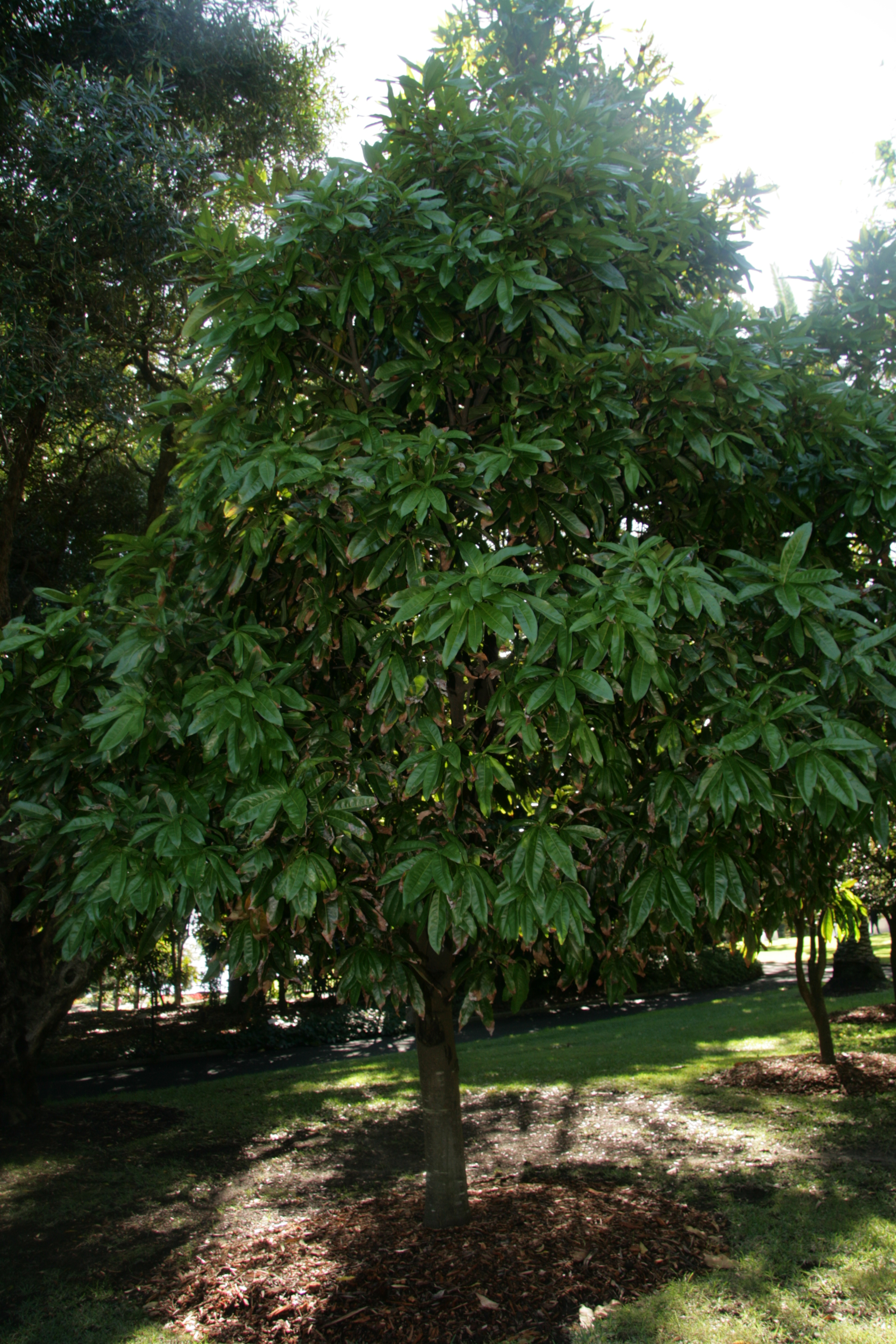
- Lasjia grandis, planted in the Royal Botanic Gardens, Sydney

Scientific classification
- Kingdom: Plantae
- Clade: Tracheophytes
- Clade: Angiosperms
- Clade: Eudicots
- Order: Proteales
- Family: Proteaceae
- Subfamily: Grevilleoideae
- Tribe: Macadamieae
- Subtribe: Macadamiinae
- Genus: Lasjia; P.H.Weston & A.R.Mast

Type species
- Lasjia claudiensis (C.L.Gross & B.Hyland) P.H.Weston & A.R.Mast

= Lasjia =

Genus of trees

Lasjia is a genus of six species of trees of the family Proteaceae. Three species grow naturally in northeastern Queensland, Australia, and three species in Sulawesi, Indonesia. Descriptively they are the tropical or northern macadamia trees group. Lasjia species characteristically branched compound inflorescences differentiate them from the Macadamia species, of Australia, which have characteristically unbranched compound inflorescences and only grow naturally about 1,000 km (620 mi) further to the south, in southern and central eastern Queensland and in northeastern New South Wales.

The Bama aboriginal Australian peoples in the late 1800s Bellenden Ker Range rainforests (north east Queensland) taught European–Australian scientists of L. whelanii trees bearing the large seeds "extensively used for food". One of those scientists, colonial botanist Frederick M. Bailey, collected and in 1889 formally published a scientific description of specimens of them under the name Helicia whelanii and later again in 1901 as a species of Macadamia. Of these five Lasjia species, it was the first to receive a European–Australian scientific name.

== Names and classification ==
Genetics studies published in 2008 by Austin Mast and colleagues show they have separated from the genus Macadamia, correlating less closely than previously thought from morphological studies. The ancestors of Lasjia appear to have diverged just under 30 million years ago in the Oligocene epoch from a lineage which has given rise to the Australian genus Macadamia, the South African species Brabejum stellatifolium, Australian rainforest species Nothorites megacarpus, and South American genus Panopsis.

The genus name was coined from the initials of Lawrence Alexander Sidney Johnson (LASJ), who had done much pioneering work on the Proteaceae. The type species is Lasjia claudiensis. L. claudiensis and L. grandis were only formally scientifically described as recently as 1993 under the genus Macadamia, with botanists making field collections of scientific specimens only since about 1948. Genetics studies published in 2008 reported L. whelanii as the earliest offshoot within the genus.

== Species ==
- Lasjia claudiensis (C.L. Gross & B. Hyland) P.H. Weston & A.R. Mast - ne Queensland
- Lasjia erecta (J.A. McDonald & R. Ismail) P.H. Weston & A.R. Mast - Sulawesi
- Lasjia grandis (C.L. Gross & B. Hyland) P.H.Weston & A.R.Mast - ne Queensland
- Lasjia hildebrandii (Steenis) P.H.Weston & A.R.Mast - Sulawesi
- Lasjia whelanii (F.M. Bailey) P.H. Weston & A.R. Mast - ne Queensland
- Lasjia griseifolia (Utteridge & Brambach) - Sulawesi

== Descriptions and natural distributions ==
All species grow naturally into trees, with whorled, simple adult leaves with smooth margins (unserrated, spineless) and bearing their flowers in branched compound inflorescences generally at the ends of the foliage or sometimes from older branches under the foliage. The fruits of L. claudiensis, L. grandis, L. hildebrandii, and L. whelanii have thin inner shells (testae) of about 1–2 mm (0.04–0.08 in) unlike the well-known macadamia nuts' thicker woody inner shells.

Lasjia claudiensis and L. grandis have significantly larger fruits and seeds; they have fruit diameters of 6.5 ± 1.5 cm (2.6 ± 0.6 in) and 5–7 cm (2.0–2.8 in), respectively, and seeds diameters of 5.5–6.5×5 cm long (2.2–2.6×2.0 in) and 3–4 cm (1.2–1.6 in), respectively.

Lasjia claudiensis is endemic to the Iron Range region of Cape York Peninsula, far north Queensland, in more seasonally dry rainforests and gallery forests, from about 0 to 600 m (0 to 1,969 ft) altitude. L. claudiensis has the Australian national conservation status listing of "vulnerable" in the Australian government Environment Protection and Biodiversity Conservation Act 1999 (EPBC), and the Queensland official state conservation status of "vulnerable" species in the Queensland government Nature Conservation Act 1992.

Lasjia grandis grows naturally only in the rainforests of the Wet Tropics region of northeastern Queensland, from about 0 to 460 m (0 to 1,509 ft) altitude. L. grandis trees received their name for growing to the largest size of the macadamia group, of up to about 40 m (130 ft), with trunks up to 120 cm (47 in) diameter, with some having buttresses. L. grandis has an official Queensland state conservation status of "vulnerable" species in the Queensland government Nature Conservation Act 1992.

Lasjia whelanii grows naturally only in the rainforests of the Wet Tropics region of northeastern Queensland, from about 0 to 700 m (0 to 2,297 ft) altitude.

Lasjia hilderbrandii and L. erecta are endemic to Sulawesi (Indonesia) and its smaller adjacent islands, and there's even less published knowledge of them. Up to the date of 1995, all populations of L. hilderbrandii were found below 450 m (1,480 ft) altitude, except one specimen collection. A collection beyond Sulawesi was made in west Sumatra, although whether its origin was natural and a significant extension of range or a recently introduced plant, was unconfirmed in 1995. Up to 1995, all populations found of L. erecta were between 900 and 1,700 m (3,000 and 5,600 ft) altitude. Therefore, as far as was known in 1995, the two species have separate habitats and geographic distributions (allopatric). The two species clearly have a close evolutionary relationship with many characteristics in common, endemic to the Sulawesi region, the flower structures in whorls of racemes at the ends of uppermost branches and the whorled leaves with smooth margins. The distinctive characteristics of L. erecta of short and erect flower structures and of smaller leaves in whorls of four compare to the characteristics of L. hildebrandii of flower structures longer and arching or pendulous and of larger leaves in whorls of five to seven.

== Uses for foods ==
Peoples of Sulawesi (Indonesia) make foods from the uncertain and inconclusively toxic or nontoxic seeds of L. hildebrandii, according to incomplete English language documentation.

Umpila and related peoples in the Iron Range region make use of L. claudiensis and Bama peoples of the Wet Tropics region also make use of L. grandis, apparently knowing them well for their uses and regarding their distributions, respectively. Only in recent decades has English-language botanical science recognised, described, and published brief documentation about these two species, with more learning or field work required to record their full distributions and uses. The few documents available are the brief journal paper formally scientifically describing these two species, the published archaeological work of Nicky Horsfall's journal papers and PhD and the reports of the 1889 Archibald Meston expedition; the latter two bodies of work were undertaken in the Bellenden Ker Range region.
