= Isotenes syndesma =

Scientific classification
- Kingdom: Animalia
- Phylum: Arthropoda
- Class: Insecta
- Order: Lepidoptera
- Family: Tortricidae
- Genus: Isotenes
- Species: I. syndesma

Binomial name
- Isotenes syndesma Razowski, 2013

Species of moth

Isotenes syndesma is a species of moth of the family Tortricidae first described by Józef Razowski in 2013. It is found on Seram Island in Indonesia. The habitat consists of lower montane forests.

The wingspan is about 20 mm.

== Etymology ==
The species name is derived from Greek desma (meaning a fascia) and syn (meaning together).
