= Virotia neurophylla =

Conservation status
- Vulnerable (IUCN 3.1)

Scientific classification
- Kingdom: Plantae
- Clade: Tracheophytes
- Clade: Angiosperms
- Clade: Eudicots
- Order: Proteales
- Family: Proteaceae
- Genus: Virotia
- Species: V. neurophylla

Binomial name
- Virotia neurophylla (Guillaumin) P. H. Weston & A. R. Mast

Synonyms
- Kermadecia neurophylla Guillaumin; Macadamia neurophylla (Guillaumin) Virot

Species of plant endemic to New Caledonia

Virotia neurophylla (previously Macadamia neurophylla) is a species of plant in the family Proteaceae. It is endemic to New Caledonia. It is threatened by habitat loss. It has recently been transferred to the genus Virotia, which is also endemic to New Caledonia.
