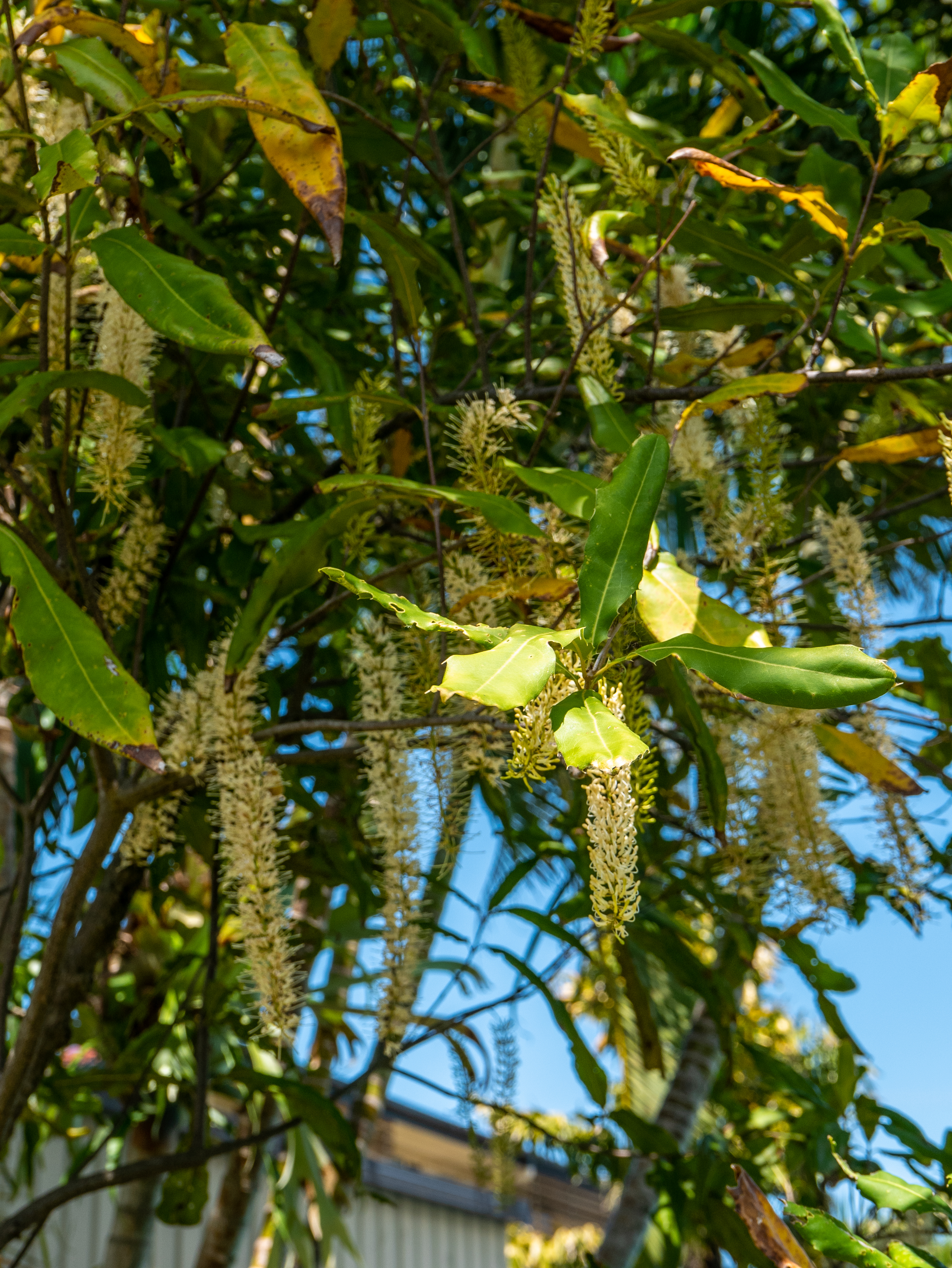
- Inflorenscences and foliages of Macadamia integrifolia at Geebung, Queensland
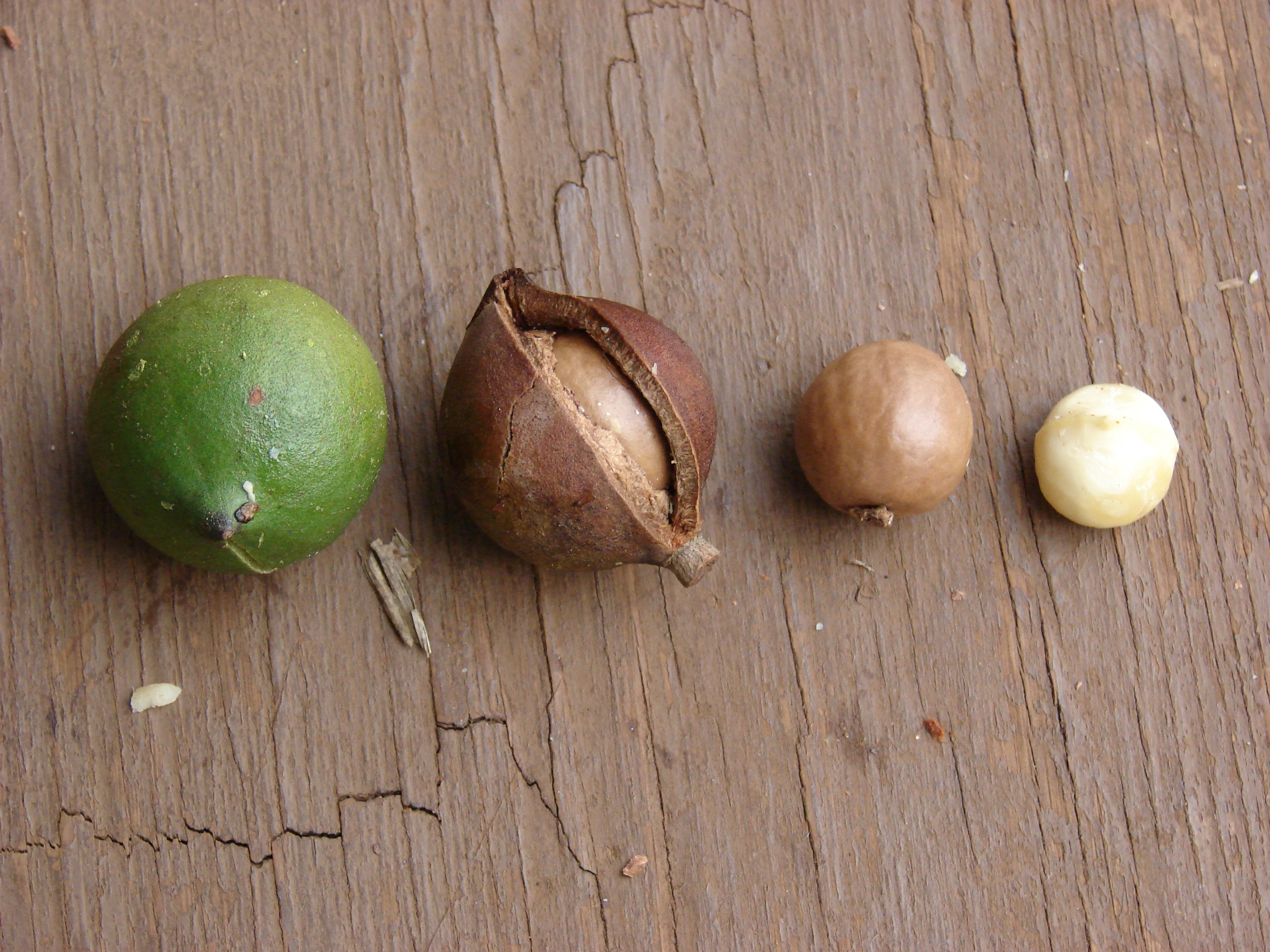
- Different stages of Macadamia integrifolia nut

Conservation status
- Vulnerable (IUCN 3.1)

Scientific classification
- Kingdom: Plantae
- Clade: Embryophytes
- Clade: Tracheophytes
- Clade: Spermatophytes
- Clade: Angiosperms
- Clade: Eudicots
- Order: Proteales
- Family: Proteaceae
- Genus: Macadamia
- Species: M. integrifolia

Binomial name
- Macadamia integrifolia Maiden & Betche

= Macadamia integrifolia =

Species of flowering plant native to Australia

Macadamia integrifolia is a small to medium-sized tree native to Australian rainforests. Common names include macadamia, smooth-shelled macadamia, bush nut, Queensland nut, Bauple nut and nut oak.

== Description ==
Macadamia integrifolia trees grow to 15 metres (49 ft) in height.

The leaves are simple, oblong in shape, glossy, entire with wavy leaf margins and are 20 centimetres (8 in) long and 10 cm (3.9 in) wide. The flowers are white or pink followed by woody, edible rounded fruits which are 2–3.5 cm (0.8–1.4 in) in diameter.

== Distribution and habitat ==
It is native to rainforests in southeast Queensland and extreme adjacent northern New South Wales, Australia.

It has been introduced to Mexico and has done well in the states of Michoacán and Jalisco.

The trees will survive in hardiness zones 10 and 11.

== Ecology ==
The trees in Australia can be affected by fungal pathogens from the Neopestalotiopsis genus and the Pestalotiopsis genus (both of the Sporocadaceae family); they both cause flower blight.

== Uses ==
This tree is rarely cultivated for ornamental purposes.

== See also ==
- Macadamia

== Other sources ==
- "Macadamia integrifolia". Australian Plant Name Index (APNI), IBIS database. Canberra, Australian Capital Territory: Centre for Plant Biodiversity Research, Australian Government.
- G. J. Harden. "New South Wales Flora Online: Macadamia integrifolia". Royal Botanic Gardens & Domain Trust, Sydney, Australia.
