= Hyperaccumulator =

Category of plant

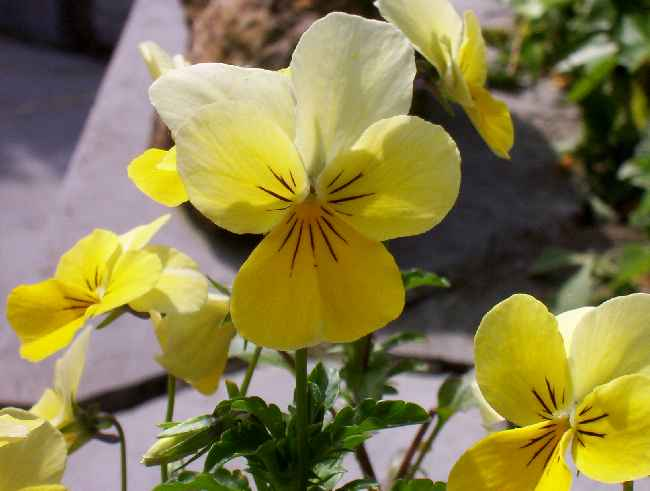
Viola lutea subsp. calaminaria, also known as the zinc violet, grows in soils high in zinc.

A hyperaccumulator is a category of metallophyte that is capable of growing in soil or water with a higher concentration of metals, absorbing the metals through its roots and storing it in its foliage. The metals are concentrated at levels that are toxic to closely related species not adapted to growing on the metalliferous soils. Approximately 85-90% of hyperaccumulators are obligate metallophytes.

Compared to non-hyperaccumulating species, hyperaccumulator roots extract the metal from the soil at a higher rate, transfer it more quickly to their shoots, and store large amounts in leaves and roots. The ability to hyperaccumulate toxic metals compared to related species has been shown to be due to differential gene expression and regulation of the same genes in both plants. Hyperaccumulators are regularly discussed within the context of phytoremediation, although their commercialization remains aspirational. 450 plant species, including the model organisms Arabidopsis and Brassicaceae, have demonstrated the capacity to uptake and sequester metals such as Arsenic (As), Gold (Au), Cobalt (Co), Iron (Fe), Copper (Cu), Cadmium (Cd), Chromium (Cr), Lead (Pb), Mercury (Hg), Selenium (Se), Manganese (Mn), Nickel (Ni), Zinc (Zn), Thallium (Tl), and Molybdenum (Mo) in 100–1000 times the concentration found in sister species or populations.

== Metallophytes ==
A metallophyte is a type of plant capable of surviving in metal-rich soil. Metallophytes are classified as metal indicators, excluders, or hyperaccumulators. Such plants range between obligate metallophytes and facultative metallophytes. Obligate metallophytes can only survive in the presence of heavy metals while facultative metallophytes can tolerate such conditions but are not confined to them.

== Hyperaccumulators ==
=== Table of hyperaccumulators ===
Plant Species	Common Name	Metal Accumulated	Obligate or Facultative
Alyssum murale	Yellow Tuft	Ni	Facultative
Astragalus	Astragalus	Se	
Biscutella laevigata	Buckler Mustard	Tl	Facultative
Brassica juncea	Mustard Greens	Au, Pb	
Deschampsia cespitosa	Tufted Hairgrass	Pb, Cd, Zn	
Eleocharis acicularis	Needle Spikerush	Cu, Zn, Cd, As	
Erato polymnioides	Ghost Plant	Hg	
Haumaniastrum robertii	Robert's Haumaniastrum	Co	
Helianthus annus	Common Sunflower	Cd, Ni, Pb, Cr, As	
Iberis intermedia	Candytuft	Tl	
Medicago sativa	Alfalfa	Au	
Populus nigra	Poplar	Cd, Ni, Pb, Cr	
Pteris vittata	Chinese Brake	Cr, Hg	Facultative
Pycnandra acuminata	Sève bleue	Ni	
Salix smithiana	Smith's Willow	Cd, Ni, Pb, Cr	
Salix viminalis	Basket Willow	Cd, Zn, Cu	
Solanum lycopersicum	Tomato	Cr	
Stanleya pinnata	Desert Prince’s-plume	Se	
Virotia neurophylla		Mn	
Xylorhiza	Mojave-aster	Se	
Zea mays	Maize	Cd, Ni, Pb, Cr	

Note that it is under debate as to whether Allium, Amaranthus, Iris, Lonicera, Rorippa, Salsola and Solanum are truly hyperaccumulators or metallophytes at all as their hyperaccumulation was recorded in labs, not nature.

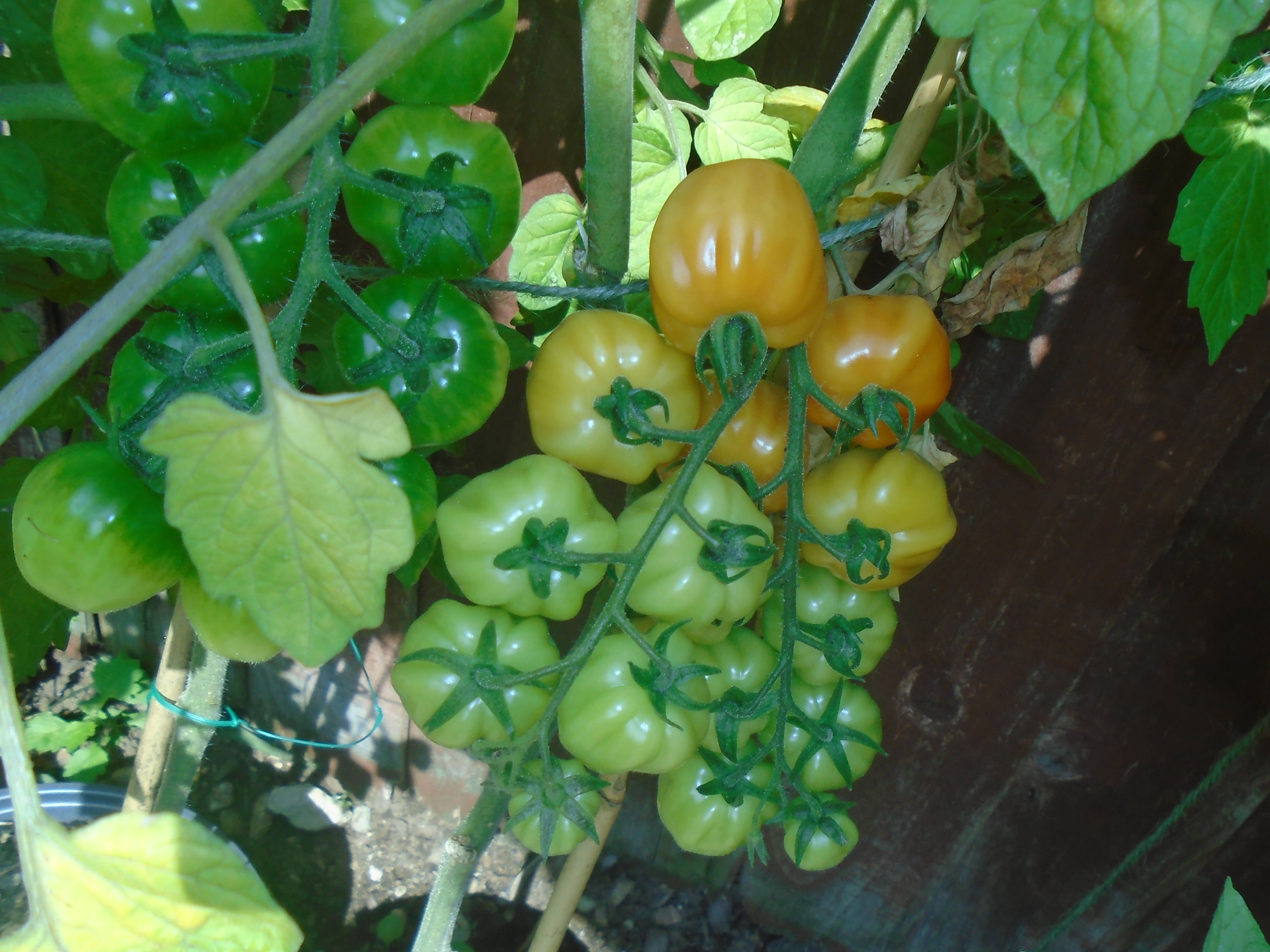
Solanum lycopersicum, commonly known as tomato plant

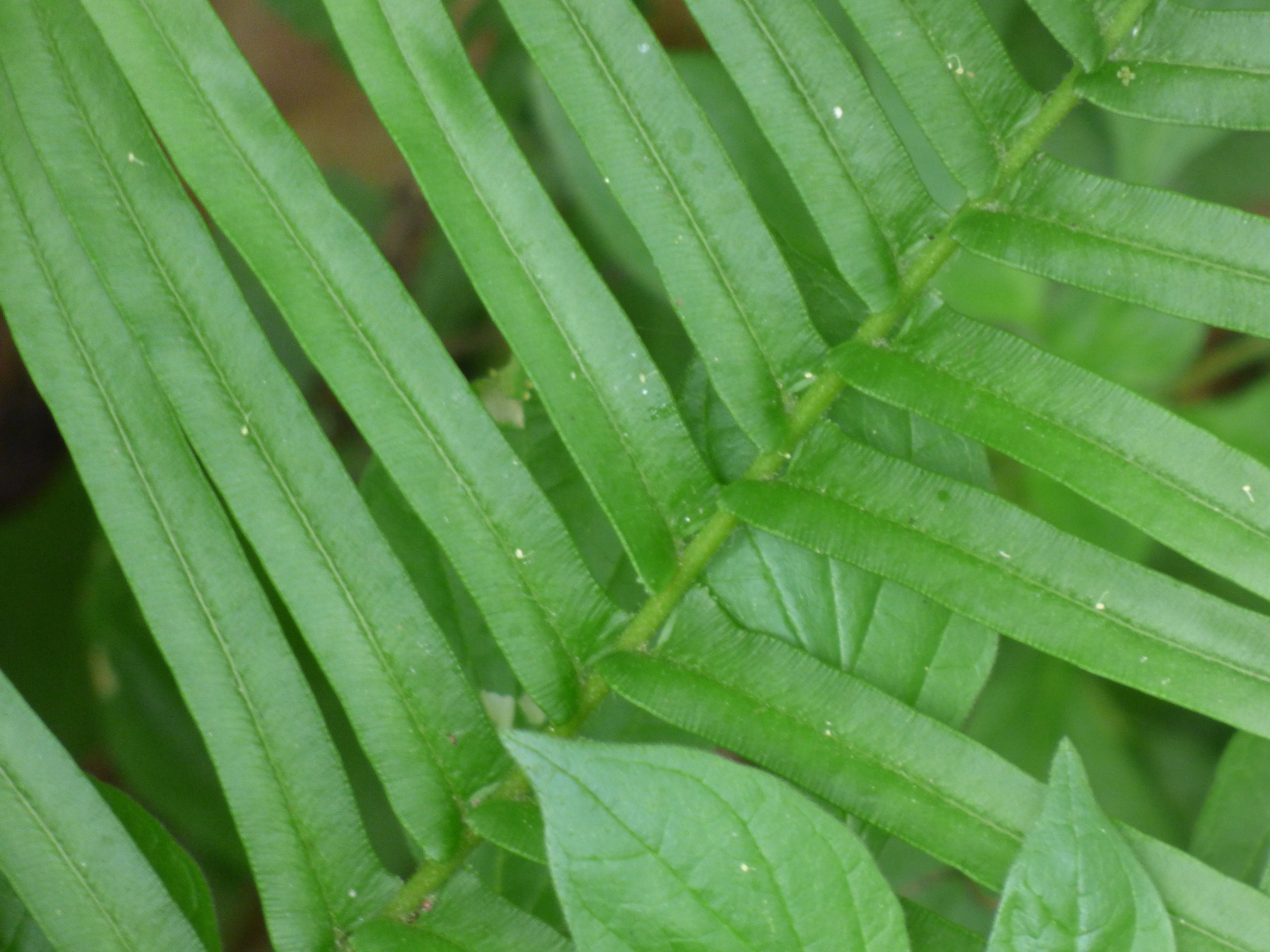
Pteris vittata, commonly known as the Chinese Brake

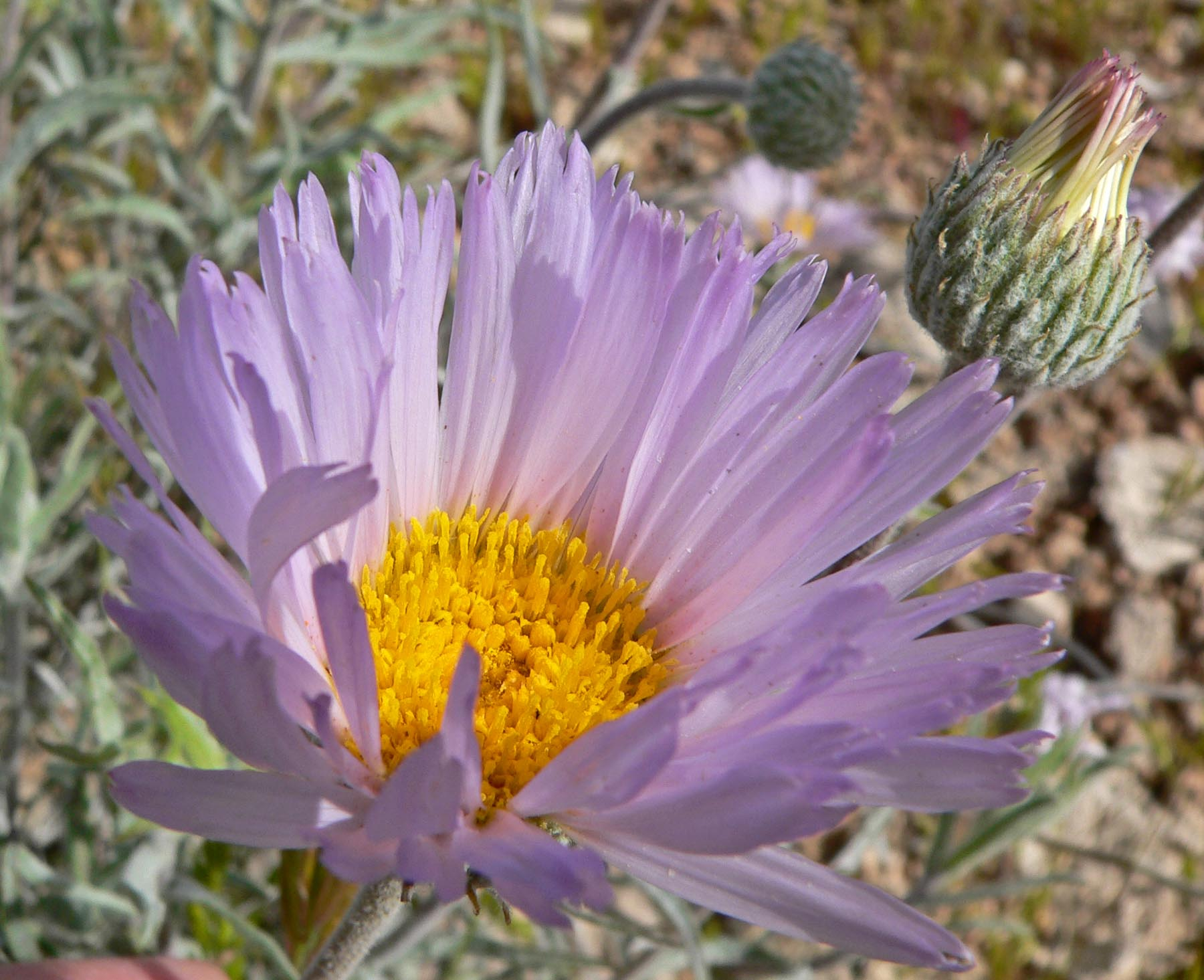
Xylorhiza, commonly known as Mojave-aster

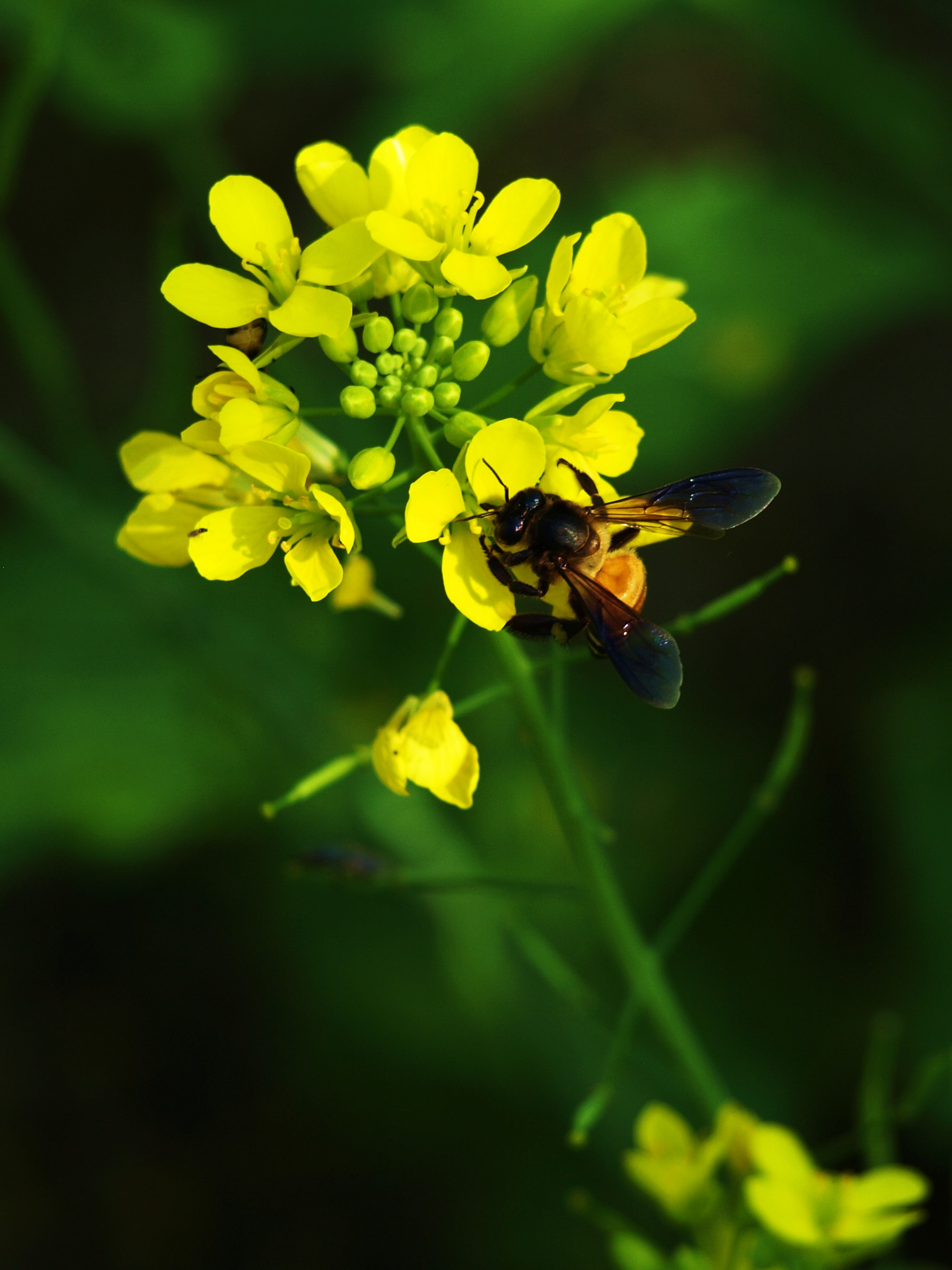
Brassica juncea, commonly known as Mustard Greens

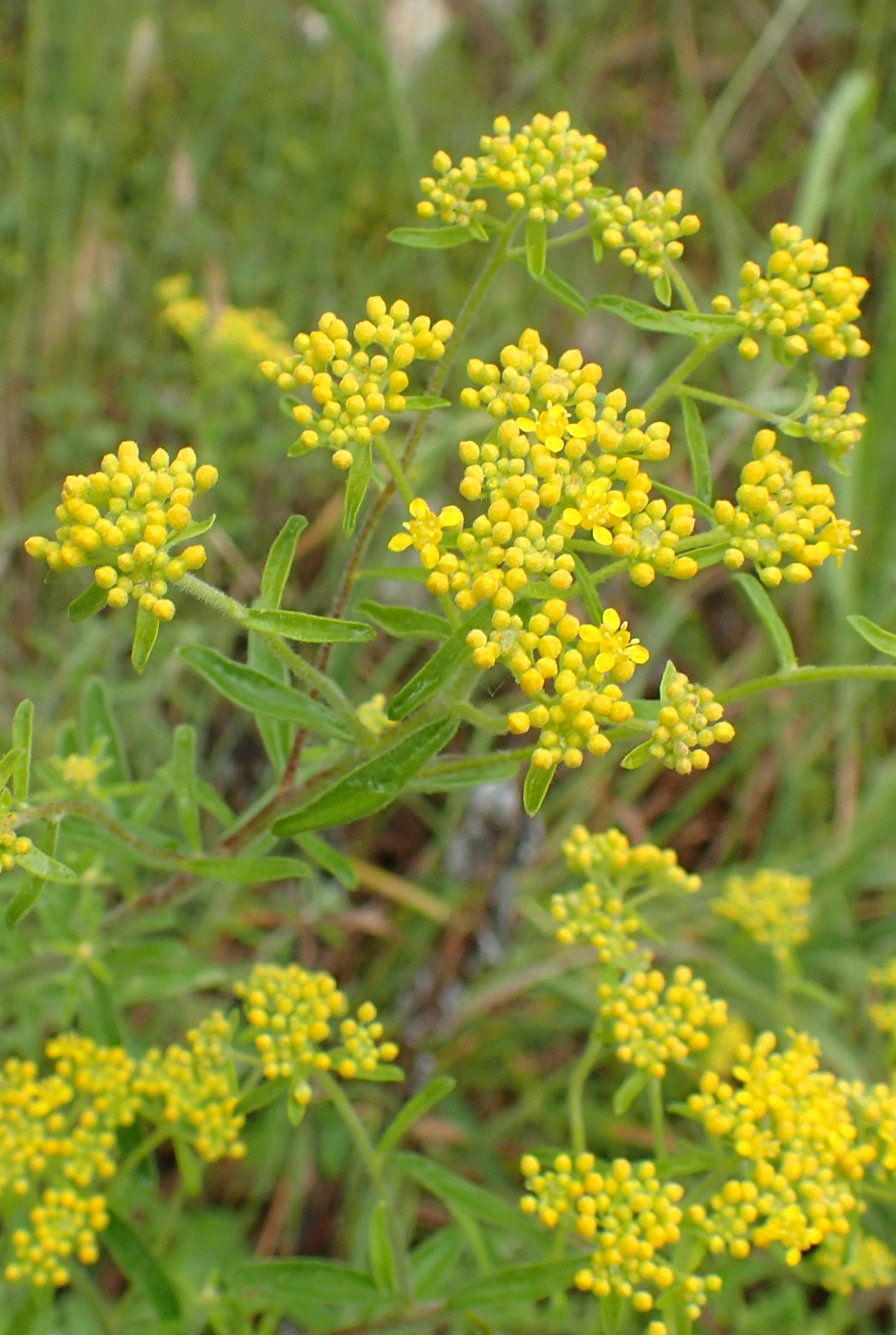
Alyssum murale, commonly known as Yellow Tuft

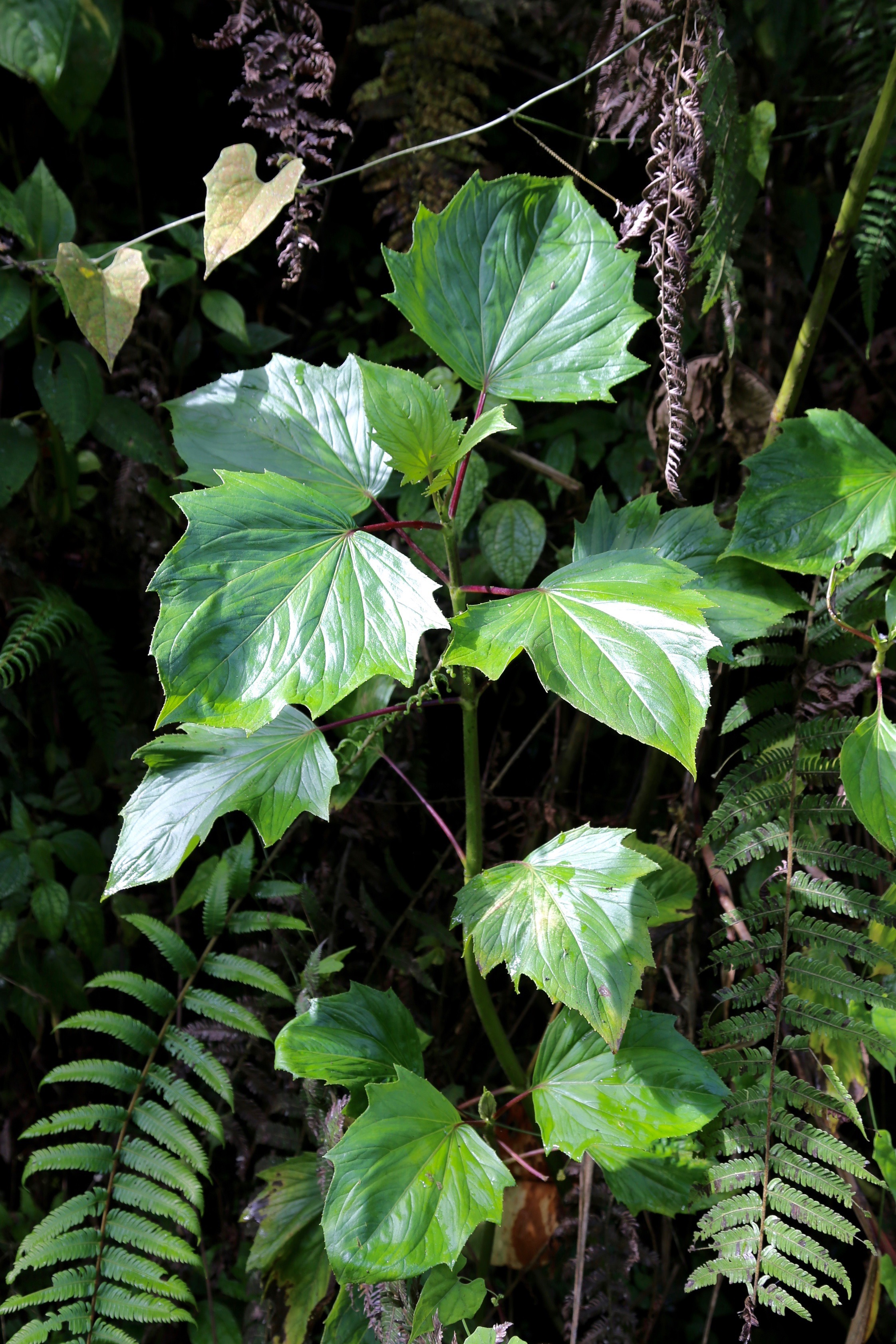
Erato polymnioides, commonly known as Ghost Plant

=== Applications of hyperaccumulators ===
Cartoon for phytoremediation of metal-contaminated soil (violet and yellow = heavy metals) by a hyperaccumulator. The metal ions are moved from the soil to the leaves of the plant. In the case of phytomining, the leaves would be harvested to recover the valuable metals.

==== Phytoremediation ====
Hyperaccumulating plants are of interest in the context of phytoremediation: to detoxify contaminated soils. Phytoextraction is a subprocess of phytoremediation in which plants remove metal ions from soil or water. Phytoextraction could in principle be used to remove contaminants from an ecosystem. For example, water hyacinth have been demonstrated to remove arsenic from water. Cadmium accumulation has also received attention as this metal is usually toxic.

Caesium-137 and strontium-90 were removed from a pond using sunflowers after the Chernobyl accident.

The remediation of metal-contaminated soils recognizes that metals cannot be degraded, they must be removed. Organic pollutants can be, and are generally the major targets for phytoremediation. Field trials support the feasibility of using plants for environmental cleanup.

==== Phytomining ====
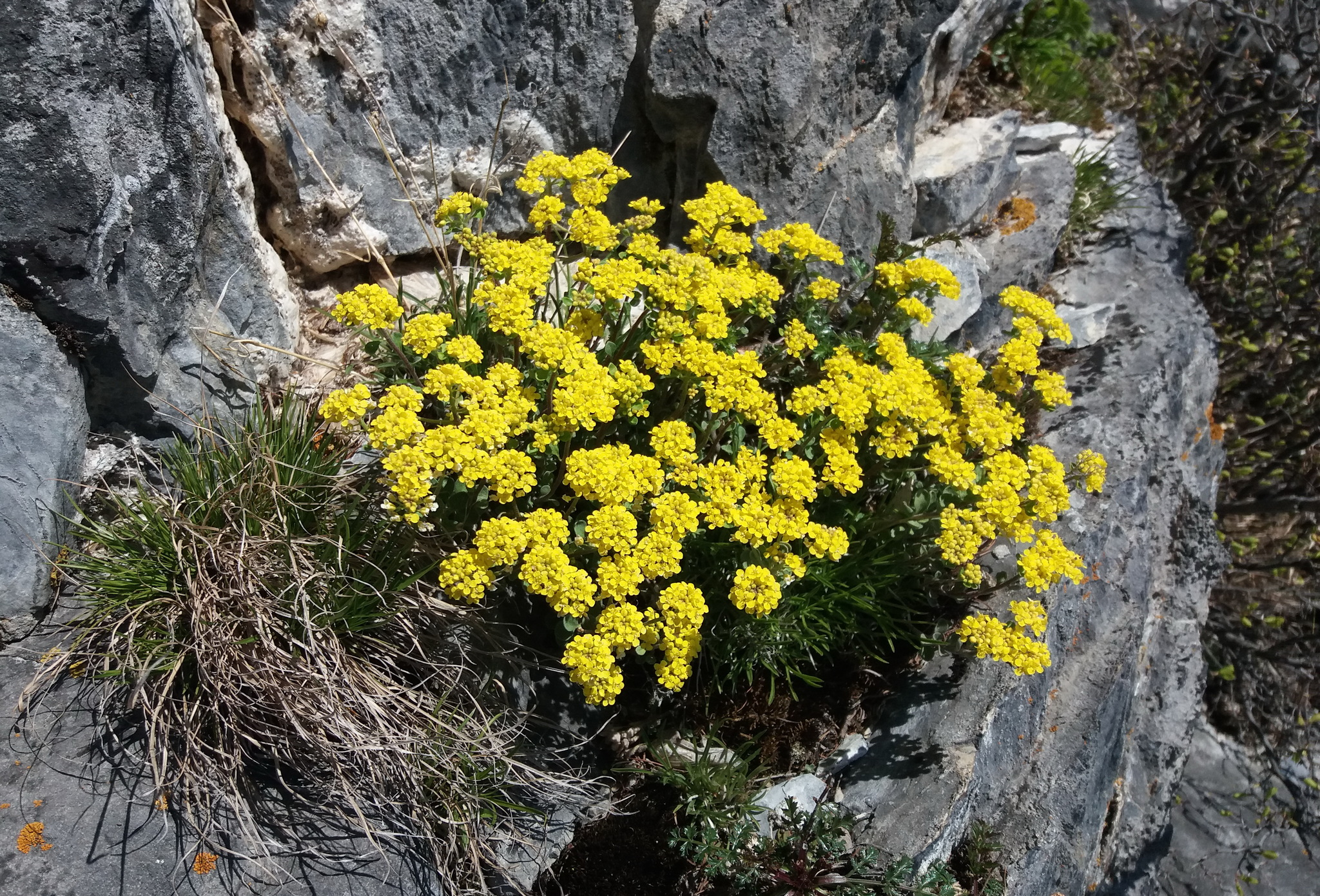
Odontarrhena plants are hyperaccumulators of nickel

Phytomining, sometimes called agromining, is the concept of extracting heavy metals from the soil using hyperaccumulating plants. Once the hyperaccumulation has proceeded to some extent, the metals are collected from the plant matter and then refined for sale or disposed of.

Phytomining typically follows three steps: 1) Phytoextraction, where metals are sequestered from soil into plants; 2) Enrichment, where plant biomass is eliminated and heavy metals are enriched as solids; 3) Extraction, where the solid remains are processed into more accessible forms.

Phytomining would, in principle, minimize environmental effects compared to conventional mining. Phytomining could also remove low-grade heavy metals from mine waste. A 2021 review concluded that the commercial viability of phytomining was "limited" because it is a slow and inefficient process. Its purpose is either: (i) gathering the metals for economic use (ii) gathering toxic metals to improve the soil.

Phytomining was proposed in 1983 by Rufus Chaney, a USDA agronomist. He and Alan Baker, a University of Melbourne professor, first tested it in 1996. They, as well as Jay Scott Angle and Yin-Ming Li, filed a patent on the process in 1995 which expired in 2015.

Several startups are investigating the process for mining surface-available heavy metals. In 2025, Genomines received 45 million dollars of Series A funding to commercialize nickel phytomining from mine tailings. The French company Econick and the Albanian company MetalPlant both have nickel phytomining projects. As of mid-2024, MetalPlant had extracted less than a kilo of usable nickel, using Odontarrhena plants.

=== Physiological advantage for hyperaccumulation ===
The biological advantage of hyperaccumulation may be that the toxic levels of heavy metals in leaves deter herbivores or increase the toxicity of other anti-herbivory metabolites. The plant defense hypothesis, "the elemental defense hypothesis", provided by Poschenrieder, suggested that the expression of these genes assist in antiherbivory or pathogen defenses by making tissues toxic to organisms attempting to feed on that plant. Another hypothesis, "the joint hypothesis", provided by Boyd, suggests that expression of these genes assists in systemic defense. The benefit for a plant to hyperaccumulate may be that root-to-shoot transport system drives hyper-accumulation by creating a metal deficiency response in roots. Additionally, hyperaccumulator plants introduced outside their native ranges can threaten native plant communities. Alyssum murale and A. corsicum, nickel hyperaccumulators native to the Mediterranean region and southern Europe, were introduced to Josephine County, Oregon in the 1990s for experimental phytomining. The plants escaped their cultivation areas and spread into surrounding serpentine habitats. In 2009, both species were designated as noxious weeds in Oregon.

=== T. caerulescens ===
As a hyperaccumulator variously of Cd, Pb, and Zn, T. caerulescens, pennycress, has received particular attention. Its leaves accumulate up to 380 mg/kg Cd. On the other hand, the presence of copper seems to impair its growth. It is found mostly in Zn/Pb-rich soils, as well as serpentines and non-mineralized soils. When grown on mildly polluted soils, a closely related species, Thlaspi ochroleucum, is a heavy metal-tolerant plant, but it accumulates much less Zn in the shoots than T. caerulescens. Thus, T. ochroleucum is a non-hyperaccumulator and of the same family T. caerulescens is a hyperaccumulator. The transfer of Zn from roots to shoots varied significantly between these two species. T. caerulescens had much higher shoot/root Zn concentration levels than T. ochroleucum, which always had higher Zn concentrations in the roots. When Zn was withheld, the amount of Zn previously accumulated in the roots in T. caerulescens decreased even more than in T. ochroleucum, with a concomitantly greater rise in the amount of Zn in the shoots. The decreases in Zn in roots may be mostly due to transport to shoots, since the volume of Zn in shoots increased during the same time span.

=== Genetic basis of hyperaccumulation ===
An overexpression of a Zn transporter gene, ZNT1, in root and shoot tissue is an essential component of the Zn hyperaccumulation trait in T. caerulescens. This increased gene expression has been shown to be the basis for increased Zn^{2+} uptake from the soil in T. caerulescens roots, and it is possible that the same process underpins the enhanced Zn^{2+} uptake into leaf cells.The proteins are coded by genes in the ZIP family, however other families such as the HMA (heavy metal ATPase), MATE, YSL and MTP families have also been observed to be involved. The ZIP gene family encodes Cd, Mn, Fe and Zn transporters. The ZIP family plays a role in supplying Zn to metalloproteins.

In one study on Arabidopsis, it was found that the metallophyte Arabidopsis halleri expressed a member of the ZIP family that was not expressed in a non-metallophyte sister species. This gene was an iron-regulated transporter (IRT-protein) that encoded several primary transporters involved with cellular uptake of cations above the concentration gradient. When this gene was transformed into yeast, hyperaccumulation was observed. This suggests that overexpression of ZIP family genes that encode cation transporters is a characteristic genetic feature of hyperaccumulation. Another gene family that has been observed ubiquitously in hyperaccumulators are the ZTP and ZNT families. A study on T. caerulescens identified the ZTP family as a plant specific family with high sequence similarity to other zinc transporter. Both the ZTP and ZNT families, like the ZIP family, are zinc transporters. It has been observed in hyperaccumulating species, that these genes, specifically ZNT1 and ZNT2 alleles are chronically overexpressed.

AhHMHA3 is expressed in hyperaccumulating individuals. AhHMHA3 has been identified to be expressed in response to and aid of Zn detoxification. In another study, using metallophytic and non-metallophytic Arabidopsis populations, back crosses indicated pleiotropy between Cd and Zn tolerances. This response suggests that plants are unable to detect specific metals, and that hyperaccumulation is likely a result of an overexpressed Zn transportation system.

One of the most well-documented HMAs is HMA4, which belongs to the Zn/Co/Cd/Pb HMA subclass and is localized at xylem parenchyma plasma membranes. HMA4 is upregulated when plants are exposed to high levels of Cd and Zn, but it is downregulated in its non-hyperaccumulating relatives. Also, when the expression of HMA4 is increased there is a correlated increase in the expression of genes belonging to the ZIP (Zinc regulated transporter Iron regulated transporter Proteins) family.

=== Genetic Engineering of Hyperaccumulators ===
Genetic engineering has been used to research potential improvements towards hyperaccumulation efficiency and species resistance to biological side effects of metal uptake. Methods have included engineering overexpression of pollutant degrading enzymes or proteins associated with heavy metal transportation pathways, and transgenesis, where genes from hyperaccumulators are inserted into the genome of other hyperaccumulators to target specific metals or metals previously inaccessible to that species.

For example, Sedum plumbizinicicola is a hyperaccumulator of Cd using the heavy metal transporter genes SpHMA2, SpHMA3, and SpNramp6. In 2023, Yang et al. inserted these genes into Brassica napus, or Rapeseed plants, resulting in high uptake efficiency and sequestration of Cd compared to the wild-type rapeseed.

Transgenic phytoextractors theoretically function to combine favorable traits like high biomass production with hyperaccumulation, showing the potential to improve the speed of phytoremediation. However, research reports often do not include long term data of artificial phytoextraction by transgenic plants to see if they can actually survive their entire life cycle intaking hyperaccumulator-levels of contaminants. Site implementation of transgenic plants for phytoremediation is also controversial, due to how these plants could negatively impact native biodiversity.

=== Molecular pathway ===
Often hyperaccumulation is the result of promiscuous zinc binding, i.e. protein-based sequestrants, transporters, etc with a high affinity for zinc that will bind other metal ions. Metals ions in solution are susceptible to extraction. For example, ligands secreted by plant - phytosiderophores, organic acids, or carboxylates -can selectively binds certain ions.

== Metal Excluders ==
A metal excluder is a category of metallophyte that absorbs metals at only their roots.

Plant Species	Common Name	Metal Accumulated
Bidens pilosa	Cobblers Pegs	As, Cd
Silene paradoxa	Dover Catchfly	As, Cd, Co, Cr, Cu, Fe, Mn, Ni, Pb, Zn

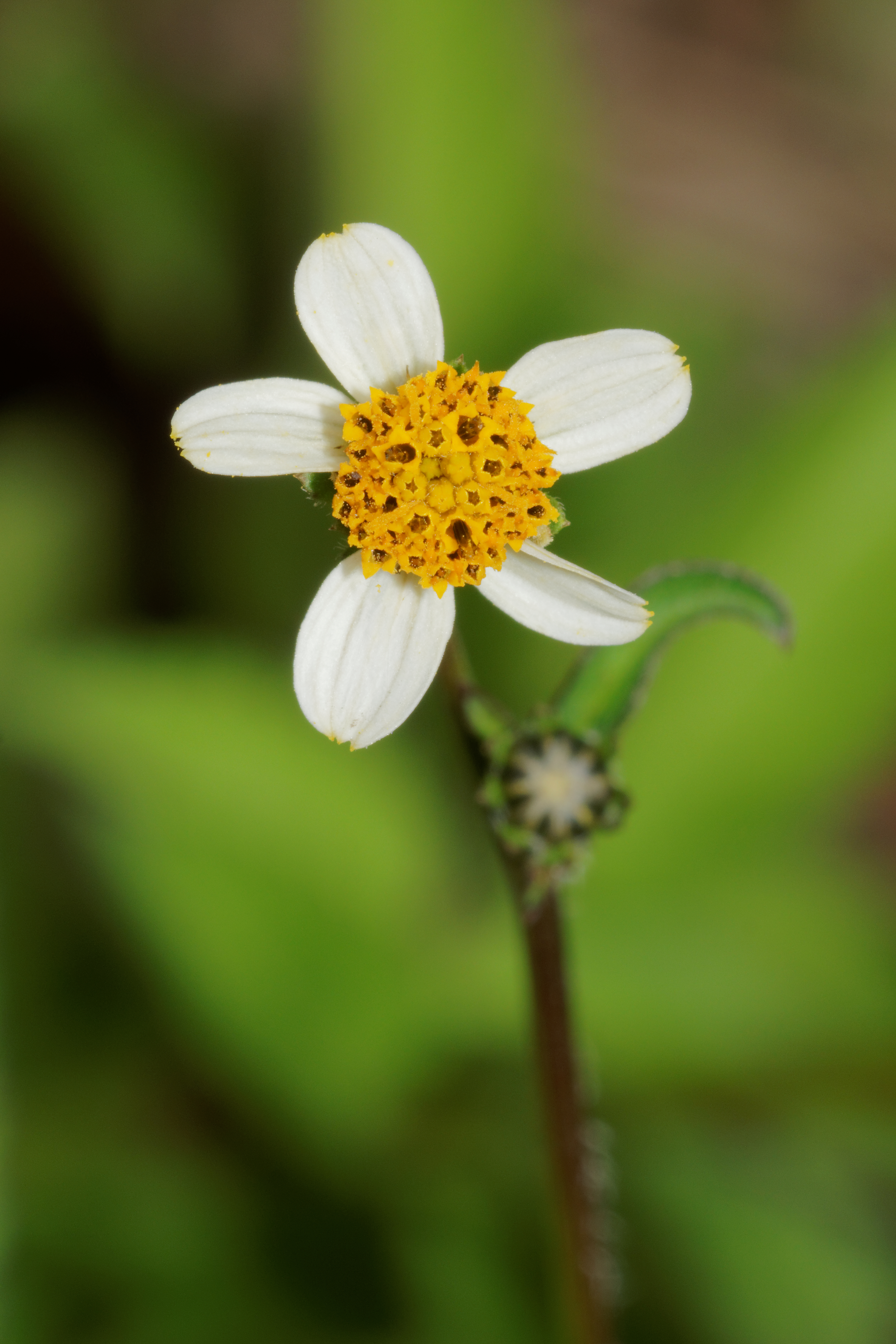
The flowering plant Bidens pilosa of the daisy family Asteraceae

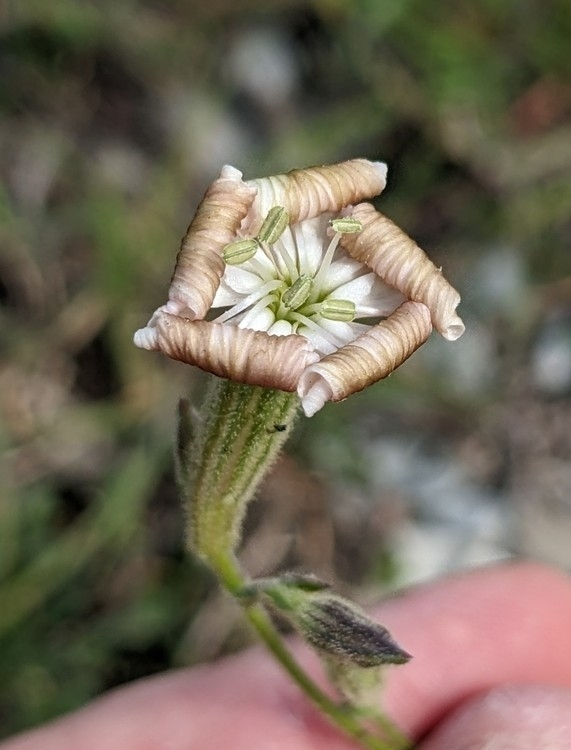
The flowering plant Silene paradoxa, or Dover Catchyfly, of the Caryophyllaceae family

== Metal Indicators ==
A metal indicator is a metallophyte that accumulates heavy metal concentration in shoots and leaves.While good at absorbing metals, they eventually succumb to the metals' toxicity.

Plant Species	Common Name	Metal Accumulated
Chara baltica	Stonewort	Pb, Cd, Hg, Ni
Cladophora spp.	Blanket Weed	Pb, Cd, Hg, Ni
Coccotylus truncatus		Pb, Cd, Hg, Ni
Fucus serratus	Toothed Wrack	Cd, Co, Cr, Cu, Fe, Ni, Pb, Zn
Furcellaria lumbricalis	Irish Moss	Pb, Cd, Hg, Ni
Patella vulgata	Common Limpet	Cd, Co, Cr, Cu, Fe, Ni, Pb, Zn
Polysiphonia fucoides	Red Seaweed	Pb, Cd, Hg, Ni
Ricinus communis	Castor Bean	Ni
Stuckenia pectinata	Sago Pondweed	Pb, Cd, Hg, Ni
Zannichellia palustris	Horned Pondweed	Pb, Cd, Hg, Ni

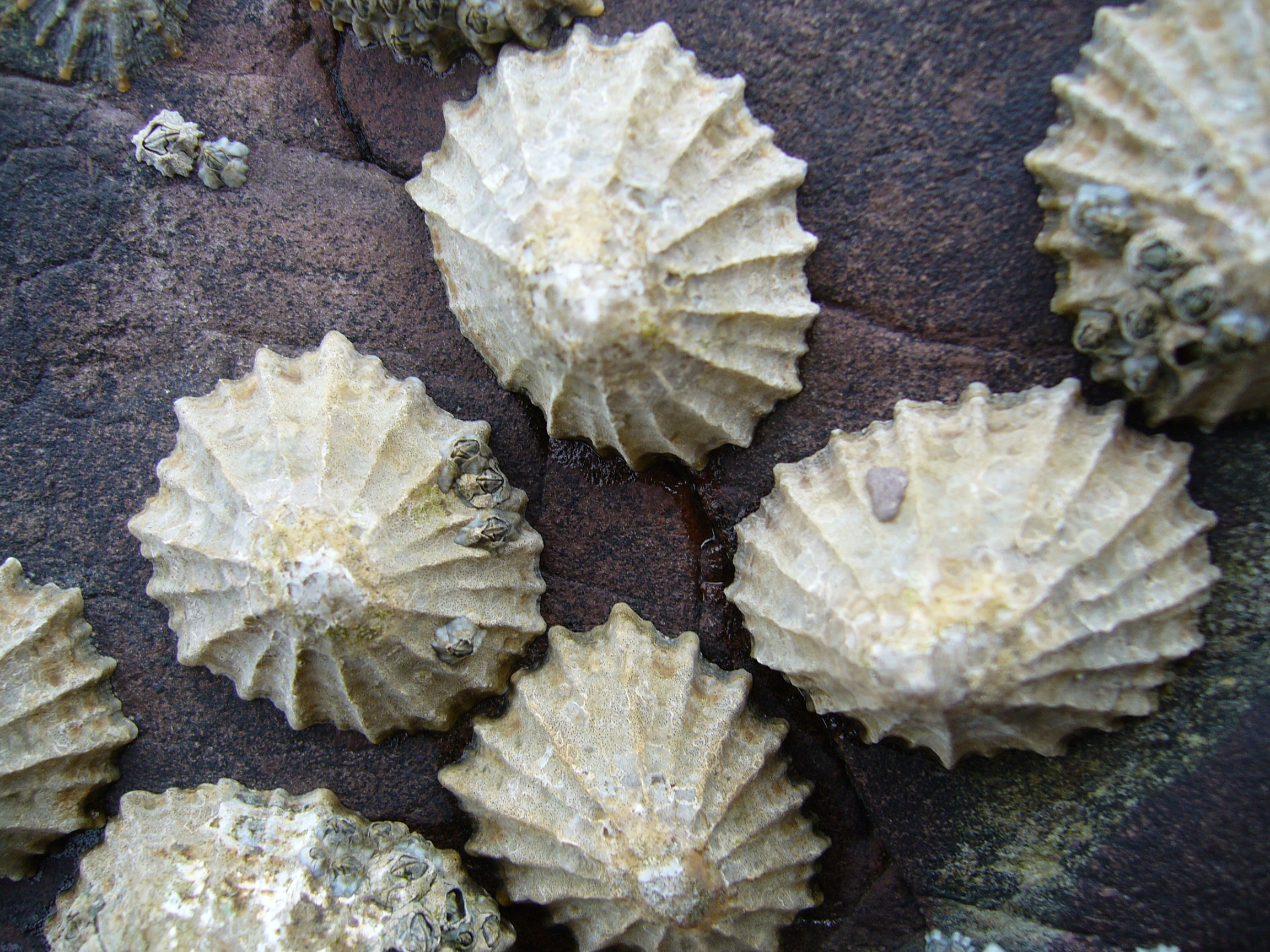
Patella vulgata, a species of sea snail commonly known as the common limpet of the family Patellidae

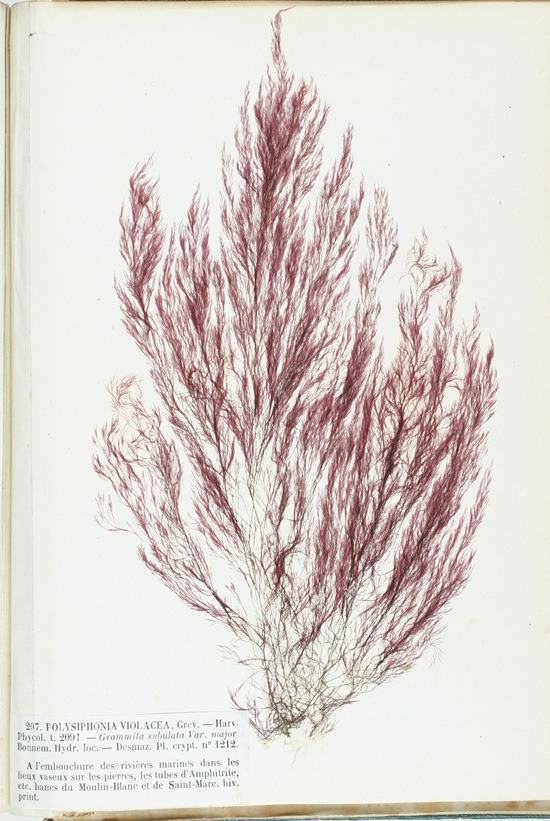
Polysiphonia fucoides, a small seaweed commonly known as red seaweed

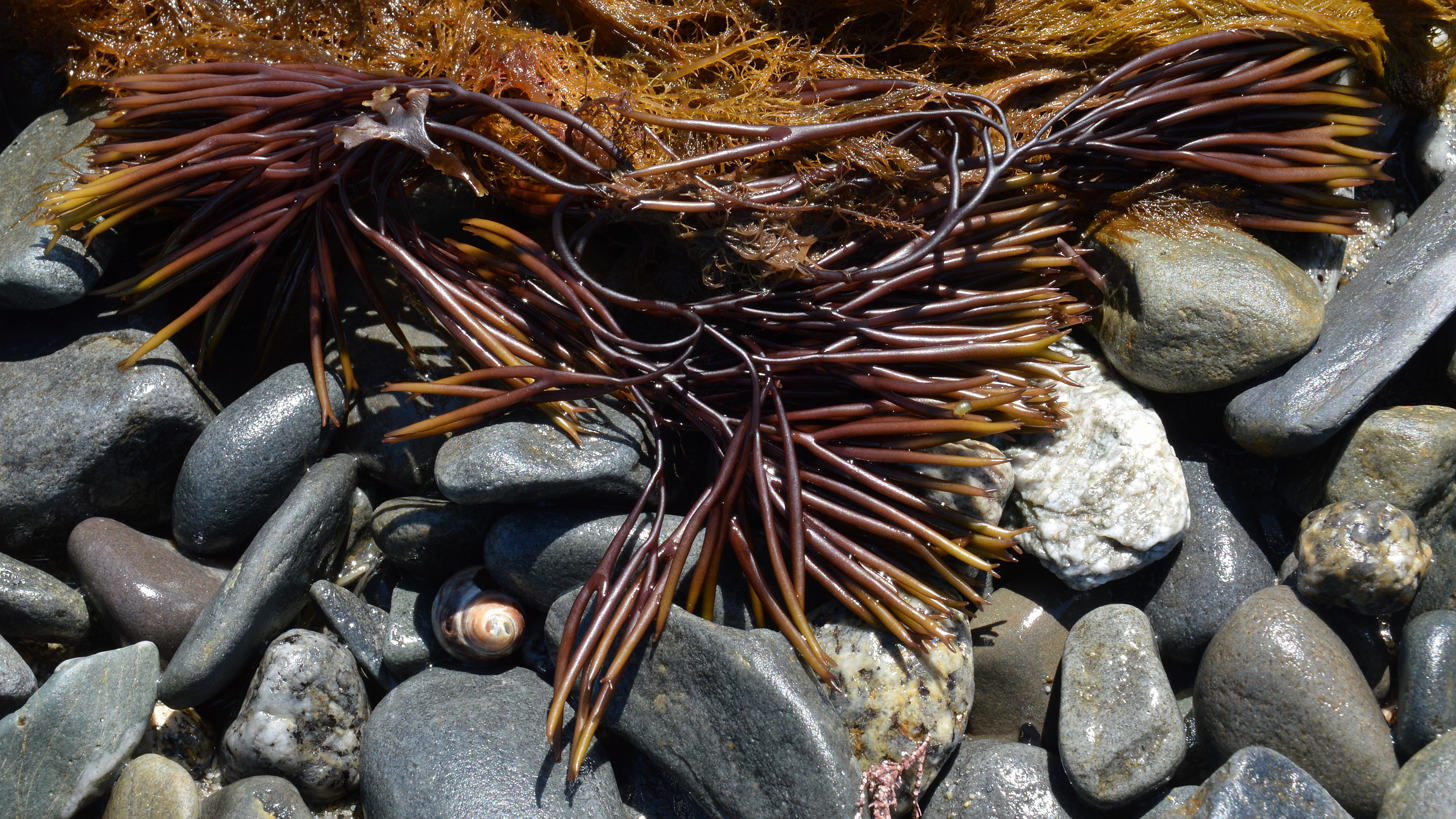
Furcellaria lumbricalis, a red algae commonly known as Irish Moss

== Other Examples ==
Alpine pennycress (Thlaspi caerulescens), the zinc violet (Viola calaminaria), spring sandwort (Minuartia verna), sea thrift (Armeria maritima), Cochlearia, common bent (Agrostis capillaris), and plantain (Plantago lanceolata).

== See also ==
- Biohydrometallurgy
  - Calaminarian grassland
- Chara baltica
- Cladophora socialis
- Coccotylus
- Furcellaria
- Polysiphonia
- Stuckenia pectinata
- Zannichellia palustris
- List of hyperaccumulators
- Phytoremediation
