= Schinia jaegeri =

Scientific classification
- Domain: Eukaryota
- Kingdom: Animalia
- Phylum: Arthropoda
- Class: Insecta
- Order: Lepidoptera
- Superfamily: Noctuoidea
- Family: Noctuidae
- Genus: Schinia
- Species: S. jaegeri

Binomial name
- Schinia jaegeri G. H. Sperry, 1940

Synonyms
- Chlorocleptria jaegeri

Species of moth

Schinia jaegeri is a moth of the family Noctuidae. It is found in southern California and northern Baja California.

The wingspan is about 27 mm.

The larvae feed on Xylorhiza orcuttii and Xylorhiza cognata.
