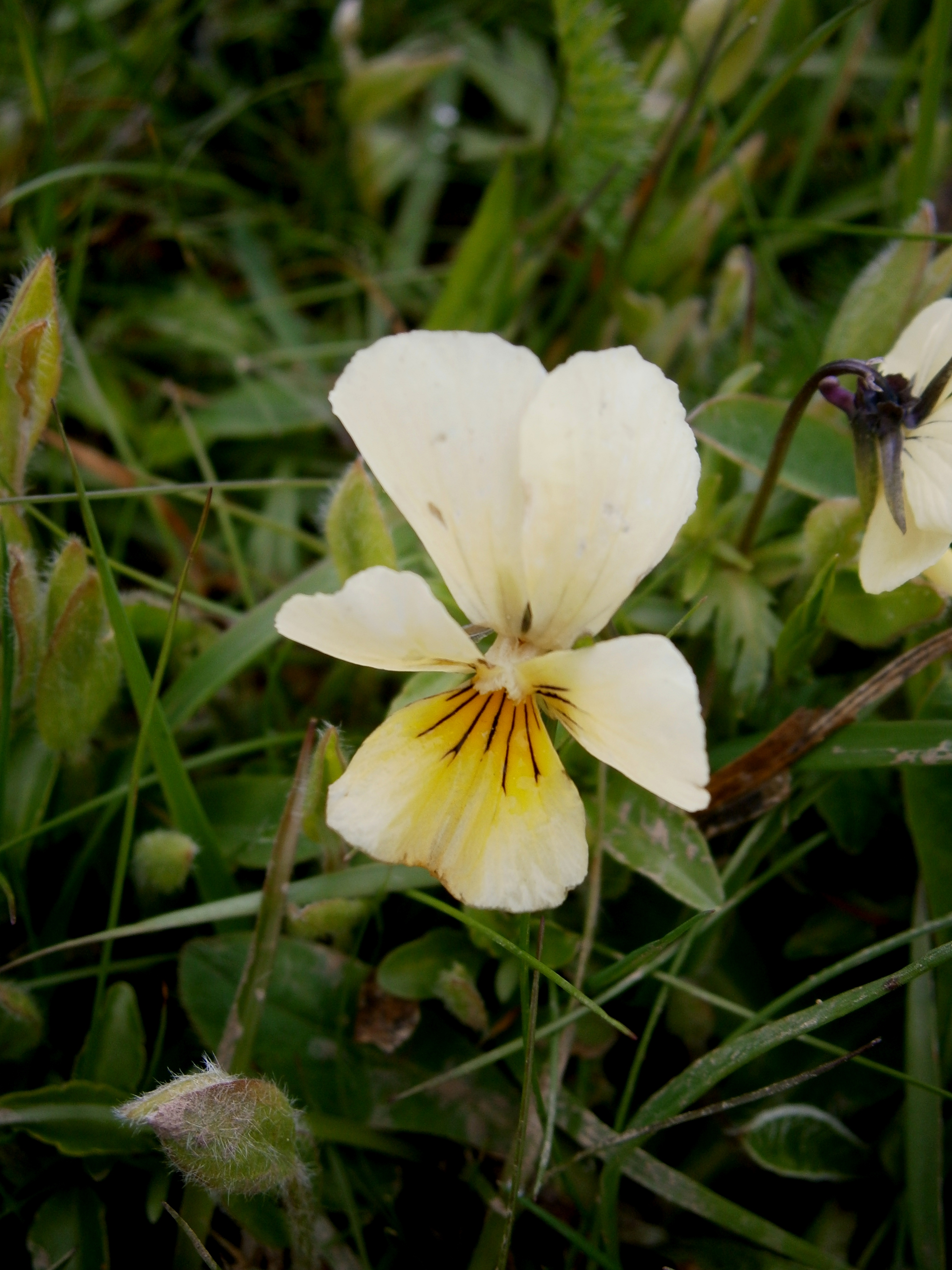

Scientific classification
- Kingdom: Plantae
- Clade: Embryophytes
- Clade: Tracheophytes
- Clade: Spermatophytes
- Clade: Angiosperms
- Clade: Eudicots
- Clade: Rosids
- Order: Malpighiales
- Family: Violaceae
- Genus: Viola
- Species: V. lutea

Binomial name
- Viola lutea Huds.

= Viola lutea =

Mountain pansy

Species of flowering plant

Viola lutea, the mountain pansy, is a species of flowering plant in the Viola genus of the viola family, Violaceae. This evergreen perennial grows in Europe, from the British Isles to the Balkans.

== Description ==
Viola lutea is a compact plant with bright oval green leaves, growing to a height of around 20 centimetres (8 in). Its flowers are 20–35 mm (0.8–1.4 in) in diameter, and are typically golden yellow, although some individuals may have blue, purple or blotched flowers instead.

== Taxonomy ==
Viola lutea was first described by William Hudson in his 1762 Flora Anglica.

The Latin specific epithet lutea means "yellow".

=== Infraspecifics ===
V. lutea subsp. lutea is native to central and north-western Europe, from the British Isles to Austria; another subspecies occurs further east, from Hungary to the Balkans.

Two particular infraspecifics are V. lutea subsp. calaminaria which occurs in the southernmost Netherlands and eastern Belgium, and V. lutea var. westfalica, which only occurs at an extremely small locality near Blankenrode in East Westphalia, Germany. Both taxa have relatively recently evolved to take advantage of the local pollution left over after centuries of mining for metals in these locations. The subspecies calaminaria grows in areas where the mine tailings for zinc ore have been dumped, and the variety westfalica grows on heaps of lead ore waste. Both taxa have managed to become the dominant plant species in their extremely small habitats.

== Distribution ==
Within Great Britain, Viola lutea is found only in upland areas north of a line drawn between the Severn and Humber estuaries; it ranges in altitude from 200 metres (660 ft) in Derbyshire to 1,070 m (3,500 ft) in Breadalbane. In Ireland, its distribution is more scattered geographically, and ranges vertically from sea level in County Clare to 380 m (1,250 ft) in the Wicklow Mountains.

== Cultivation ==
Viola lutea is cultivated as an ornamental plant, for a position in full sun or partial shade with rich soil.

It is the main progenitor for the common cultivated garden pansy, V. × wittrockiana. This hybrid was created by gardeners in Britain in the early 19th century.
