= Metal tolerance =

Metal tolerance may refer to:

- The standard tolerance to metals that all organisms possess through metal homeostasis
- The extreme tolerance to metals exhibited by hyperaccumulator species
