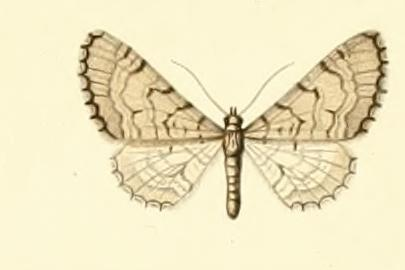
- Adult
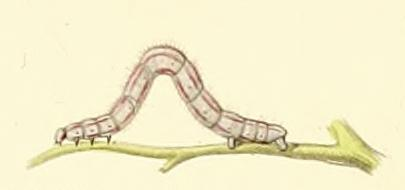
- Larva

Scientific classification
- Kingdom: Animalia
- Phylum: Arthropoda
- Class: Insecta
- Order: Lepidoptera
- Family: Geometridae
- Genus: Eupithecia
- Species: E. silenicolata

Binomial name
- Eupithecia silenicolata Mabille, 1867

= Eupithecia silenicolata =

Species of moth

Eupithecia silenicolata is a moth in the family Geometridae. It is found from southern Europe (southern France, central Italy and the Balkan Peninsula) and Morocco to western Asia (Turkey, Russia and the Caucasus), Iran and Pakistan. In the north, the range extends to southern Switzerland, Austria and northern Italy.

The wingspan is about 22 mm. Adults are on wing from May to June and again from July to August in two generations per year.

The larvae feed on Silene species which are related to Silene nutans, especially Silene paradoxa. The species overwinters in the pupal stage.

== Subspecies ==
- Eupithecia silenicolata silenicolata
- Eupithecia silenicolata perdistincta Wehrli, 1933 (Lebanon)
- Eupithecia silenicolata soultanabadi Brandt, 1941 (Iran)
- Eupithecia silenicolata zengoensis Fazekas, 1979
