= Xylorhiza =

Xylorhiza is the scientific name of two genera of organisms and may refer to:

- Xylorhiza (beetle), a genus of insects in the family Cerambycidae
- Xylorhiza (plant), a genus of plants in the family Asteraceae
