= Xylorhiza cronquistii =

Scientific classification
- Kingdom: Plantae
- Clade: Tracheophytes
- Clade: Angiosperms
- Clade: Eudicots
- Clade: Asterids
- Order: Asterales
- Family: Asteraceae
- Genus: Xylorhiza
- Species: X. cronquistii

Binomial name
- Xylorhiza cronquistii S. L. Welsh & N. D. Atwood

Synonyms
- Machaeranthera cronquistii (S. L. Welsh & N. D. Atwood) Cronquist

Species of flowering plant

Xylorhiza cronquistii, common name Cronquist's woody-aster, is a plant species endemic to the Kaiparowits Plateau in Grand Staircase–Escalante National Monument in Kane County, Utah at elevations of 1900–2100 m.

Xylorhiza cronquistii is a subshrub up to 30 cm tall. Leaves are narrowly lanceolate, sometimes with small spines along the margins. Flowers are borne in heads containing 13-17 white ray flowers plus some yellow disc flowers.
