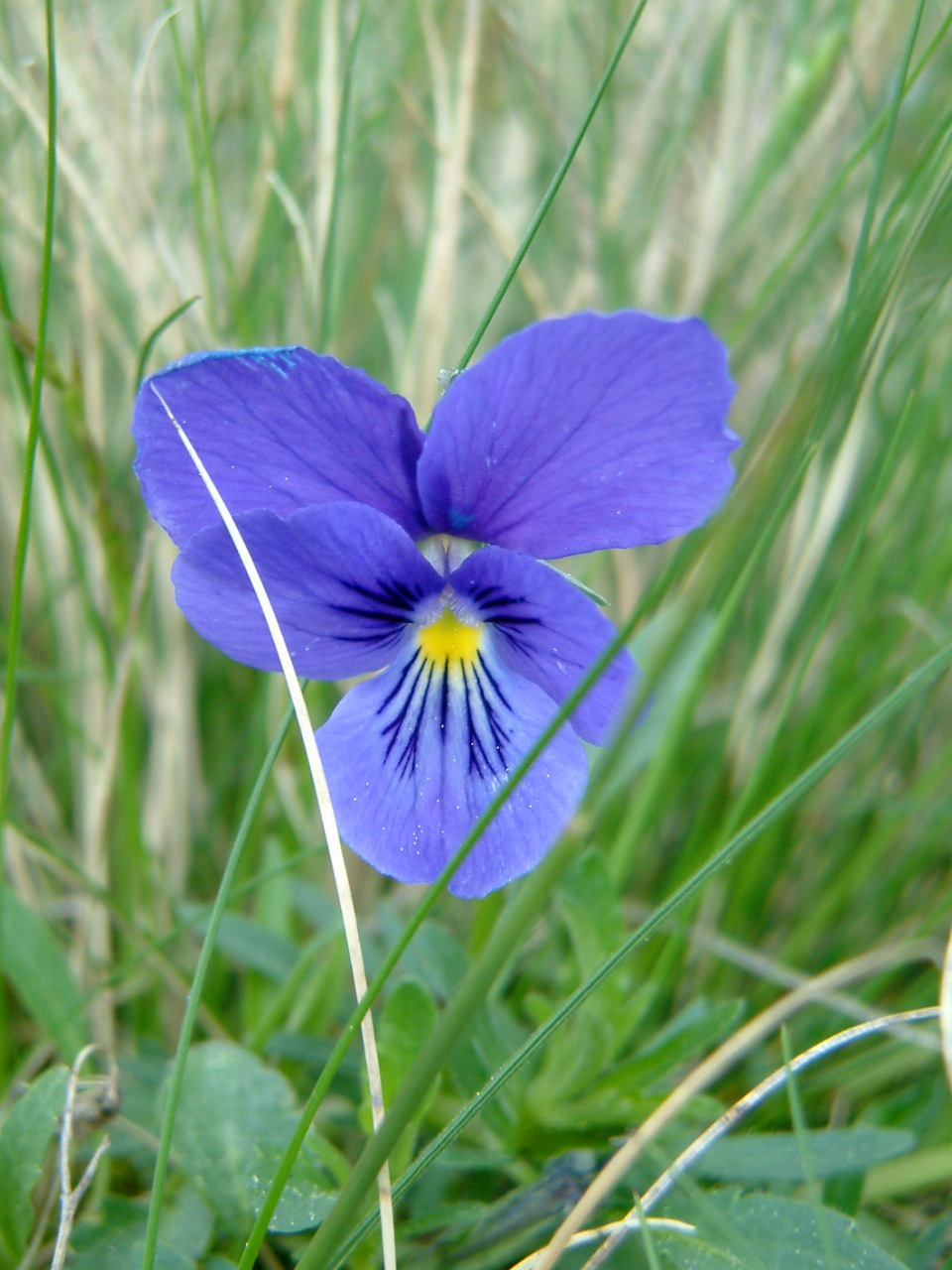

Scientific classification
- Kingdom: Plantae
- Clade: Tracheophytes
- Clade: Angiosperms
- Clade: Eudicots
- Clade: Rosids
- Order: Malpighiales
- Family: Violaceae
- Genus: Viola
- Species: V. (p.) lutea
- Variety: V. (p.) l. v. westfalica

Trinomial name
- Viola (plant) lutea var. westfalica A.A.H.Schulz

Synonyms
- Viola calaminaria var. westfalica W.Ernst; Viola calaminaria subsp. westfalica (W.Ernst) J.Heimans; Viola guestphalica Nauenb.

= Viola lutea var. westfalica =

Variety of plant

Viola lutea var. westfalica, also known as high calamine pansy, Westphalia pansy, or zinc pansy, is a variety of violet native to Westphalia, Germany. It is found in the wild only in the districts of Paderborn, Hoexter and Hochsauerlandkreis, although it is cultivated in other locations. These are industrial areas where much of the soil is contaminated with lead, zinc and other metals, which some Viola species are more able to tolerate than some other plants.

== Description ==
Viola lutea var. westfalica is in many ways similar to the yellow-flowered V. calaminaria, and was long treated as a variety of that species. Recent studies, however, suggest that it should be treated as a separate species.

It grows as an herb up to 15 cm (6 inches) tall. Flowers are blue-violet with darker blue streaks toward the center, with prominent yellow anthers.
