= Xylorhiza confertifolia =

Scientific classification
- Kingdom: Plantae
- Clade: Tracheophytes
- Clade: Angiosperms
- Clade: Eudicots
- Clade: Asterids
- Order: Asterales
- Family: Asteraceae
- Genus: Xylorhiza
- Species: X. confertifolia

Binomial name
- Xylorhiza confertifolia (Cronquist) T.J.Watson

Synonyms
- Machaeranthera confertifolia (Cronquist) Cronquist; Machaeranthera glabriuscula var. confertifolia Cronquist

Species of flowering plant

Xylorhiza confertifolia, the Henrieville woody-aster, is a rare species of flowering plant in the family Asteraceae, known only from Garfield and Kane counties in southern Utah. The common name for the species refers to the Town of Henrieville, in Garfield County. It grows on barren alkaline slopes and in open pinyon-juniper woodlands at elevations of 1,400–2,300 m (4,600–7,500 ft).

Xylorhiza confertifolia is a subshrub up to 20 cm (7.9 in) tall. Leaves are very narrow and linear, generally less than 2.5 mm (0.098 in) across. Flower heads are borne singly, with white ray and yellow disc flowers.
