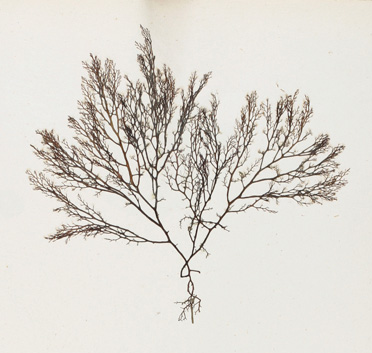

Scientific classification
- Clade: Archaeplastida
- Division: Rhodophyta
- Class: Florideophyceae
- Order: Ceramiales
- Family: Rhodomelaceae
- Genus: Vertebrata
- Species: V. fruticulosa

Binomial name
- Vertebrata fruticulosa (Wulfen) Kuntze

= Vertebrata fruticulosa =

Species of alga

Vertebrata fruticulosa(Boergeseniella fruticulosa (Wulfen) Kylin) is a small marine alga in the Division Rhodophyta.

== Description ==
Vertebrata fruticulosa is a small branched alga growing to 15 cm long. The erect axes are surrounded by 11 to 12 pericentral cells all of the same length. Cortication of small cells cover these branches. They are attached by rhizoids. Very similar to Vertebrata thuyoides and certain other species of Polysiphonia.

== Reproduction ==
There are male and female plants. Spermatangial branches grow near the apices of the young branches. Cystocarps are sessile. Tetraspores are formed near the ends of the branches distorting it into a spiral shape.

== Habitat ==
Epiphytic on other algae such as Corallina also on rock in rock pools in the littoral.

== Distribution ==
In the eastern Atlantic from the Shetland Isles, Britain, Ireland, Morocco and the Mediterranean.
