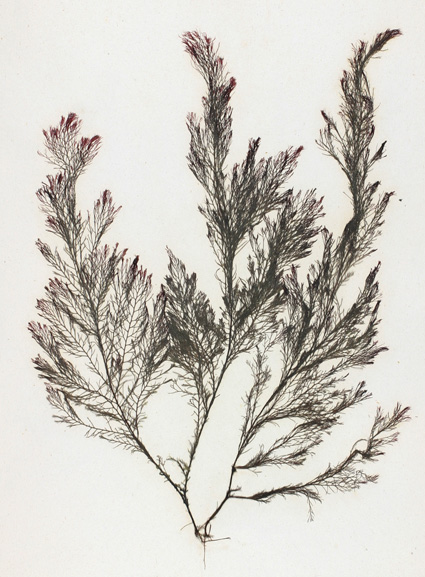

Scientific classification
- Clade: Archaeplastida
- Division: Rhodophyta
- Class: Florideophyceae
- Order: Ceramiales
- Family: Rhodomelaceae
- Genus: Polysiphonia
- Species: P. fucoides

Binomial name
- Polysiphonia fucoides (Hudson) Greville

= Polysiphonia fucoides =

Species of alga

Polysiphoides fucoides (Hudson) Greville (Vertebrata fucoides) is a common marine alga in the Division Rhodophyta.

== Description ==
Polysiphonia fucoides is a relatively small seaweed. It grows as branched, cylindrical tufts reaching 30 cm or more in length. The branches are themselves densely branched, the main branch usually distinct. It is attached by matted branches which produce rhizoids. The branches are composed of a central axes of cells surrounded by 11 to 21 pericentral cells all of the same length. Cortication is generally absent but may be formed on the major branches near the holdfast, with the cells growing down in grooves between the pericentral cells. The branching may resemble Vertebrata thuyoides, but the branches of B.thuyoides are corticated almost to the tips.

== Reproduction ==
The plants are dioecious. Spermatangial branchlets occur near the apices of the branches. Cystocarps are borne on short stalks. and tetrasporangia occur in series towards the apices of the branches.

== Habitat ==
On open rock, in pools in the littoral.

== Distribution ==
Generally distributed around Great Britain, Ireland, Isle of Man and the Channel Islands.
