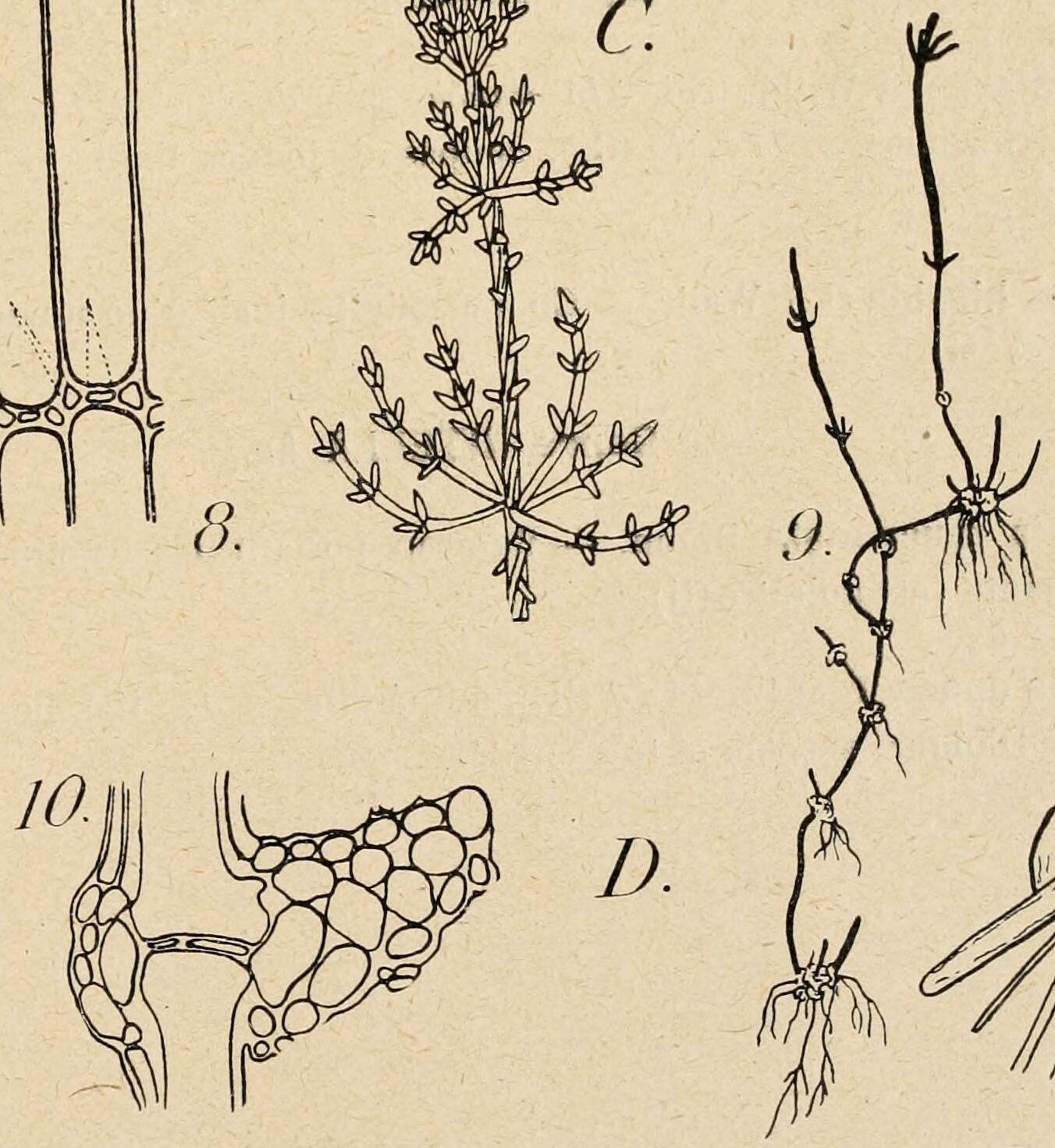
- D. C. baltica — 9 (G.). underground part. — 10 (G.), longitudinal section of a tuber. — Brackish water.

Scientific classification
- Clade: Viridiplantae
- (unranked): Charophyta
- Class: Charophyceae
- Order: Charales
- Family: Characeae
- Genus: Chara
- Species: C. baltica

Binomial name
- Chara baltica Bruzelius

= Chara baltica =

Species of alga

Chara baltica is a species of stonewort belonging to the family Characeae.

It is native to Europe.
