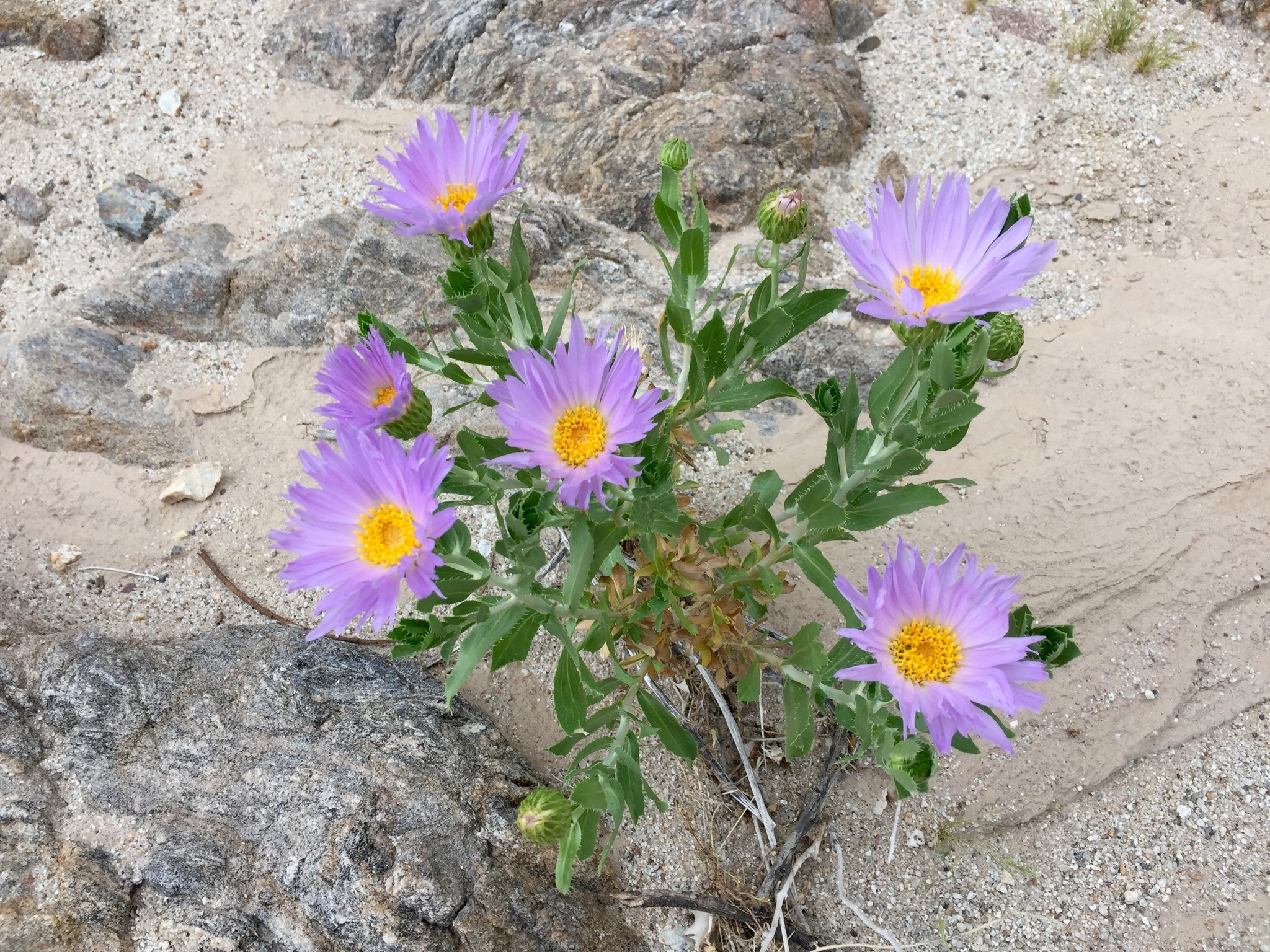
- San Diego County, California, 2017

Conservation status
- Vulnerable (NatureServe)

Scientific classification
- Kingdom: Plantae
- Clade: Tracheophytes
- Clade: Angiosperms
- Clade: Eudicots
- Clade: Asterids
- Order: Asterales
- Family: Asteraceae
- Genus: Xylorhiza
- Species: X. orcuttii

Binomial name
- Xylorhiza orcuttii (Vasey & Rose) Greene

Synonyms
- Aster orcuttii Machaeranthera orcuttii

= Xylorhiza orcuttii =

Species of flowering plant

Xylorhiza orcuttii is a perennial plant in the family Asteraceae known by the common name Orcutt's aster. It is native to southern California and northern Baja California, where it grows in scrubby habitat in the dry canyons of the Sonoran Desert. It often grows in rocky and sandy substrates, clay, and alkaline soils amongst cactus. It is a shrub with branching, mostly hairless stems that may reach 1.5 meters in length. The leaves are lance-shaped to oblong with smooth, toothed, or spiny edges. The inflorescence is a solitary flower head with up to 40 or more lavender or pale blue ray florets, each of which may measure over 3 centimeters in length. Flowering may begin as early as late fall or winter. The fruit is an achene which may be over a centimeter long, including its pappus of bristles.
