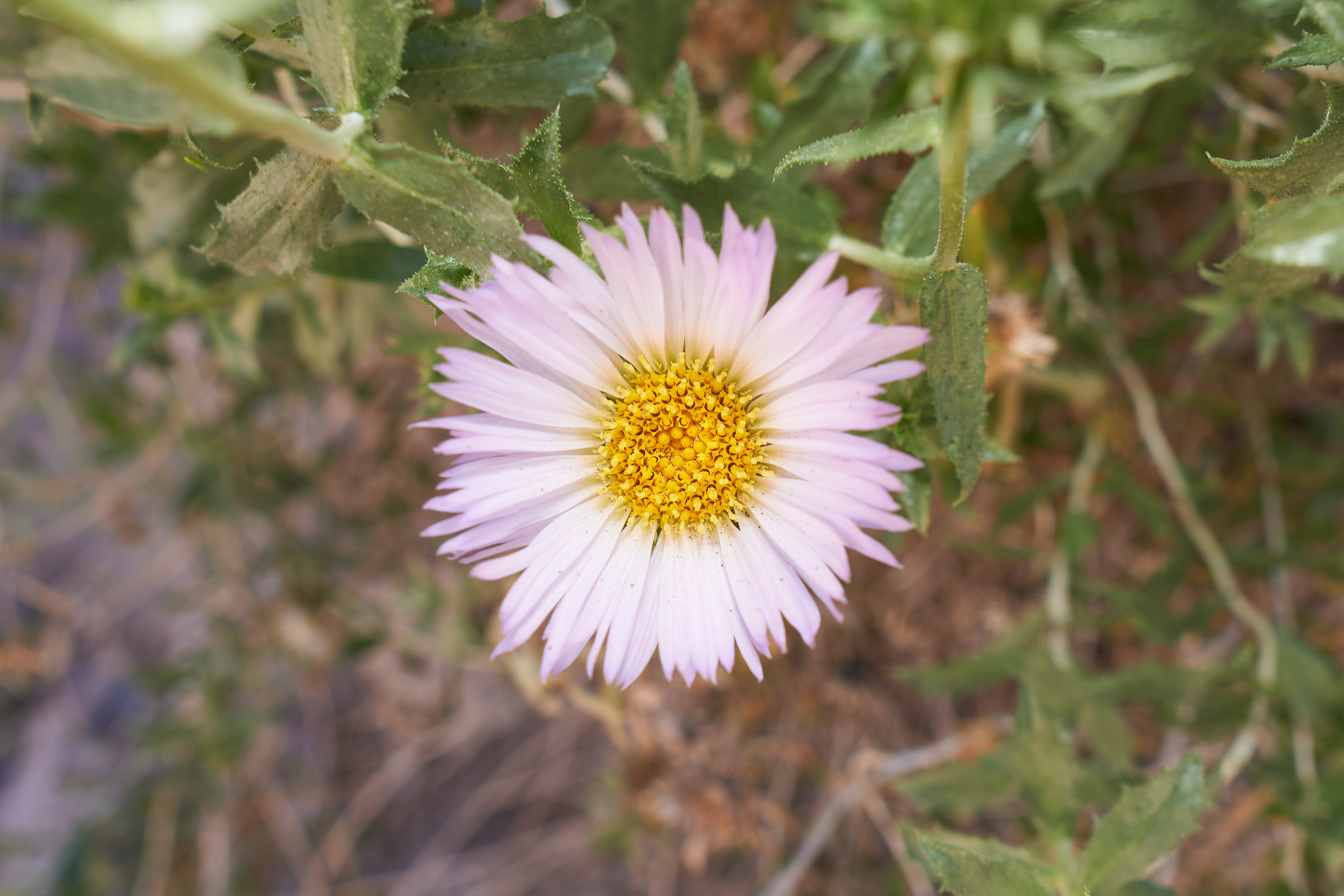

Conservation status
- Imperiled (NatureServe)

Scientific classification
- Kingdom: Plantae
- Clade: Tracheophytes
- Clade: Angiosperms
- Clade: Eudicots
- Clade: Asterids
- Order: Asterales
- Family: Asteraceae
- Genus: Xylorhiza
- Species: X. cognata

Binomial name
- Xylorhiza cognata (H.M.Hall) T.J.Watson

Synonyms
- Aster cognatus Aster standleyi Machaeranthera cognata Xylorhiza standleyi

= Xylorhiza cognata =

Species of flowering plant

Xylorhiza cognata is a rare species of flowering plant in the family Asteraceae known by the common names Mecca-aster and Mecca woodyaster.

== Distribution ==
The shrub is endemic to the Colorado Desert within southern California, in Riverside County and Imperial County. Most known populations are in the Mecca Hills and Indio Hills, located on the southeast side of the Coachella Valley and northeast of the Salton Sea.

It grows in arid canyons and bajadas/washes, below 400 metres (1,300 ft) within creosote bush scrub habitats of the Californian and northwestern Colorado Desert sub-region of the Sonoran Desert ecoregion of North America.

== Description ==
Xylorhiza cognata is a woody subshrub with branching stems that may approach 1.5 metres (4.9 ft) in height. They are hairy and glandular when new and lose their hairs with age. The leaves are lance-shaped to oval with smooth, toothed, or spiny 'holly-like' edges.

The inflorescence is a solitary flower head with up to 30 or more pale lavender to pale violet rays surrounding a yellow central disk. Each petal may measure over 2 centimeters in length. The flowering period is January to June.

The fruit is an achene which may be over a centimeter long, including its pappus of bristles.

=== Conservation ===
Xylorhiza cognata is a listed Endangered species on the California Native Plant Society Inventory of Rare and Endangered Plants. Threats to this species include recreational off-road and other vehicles, and potential property development projects.
