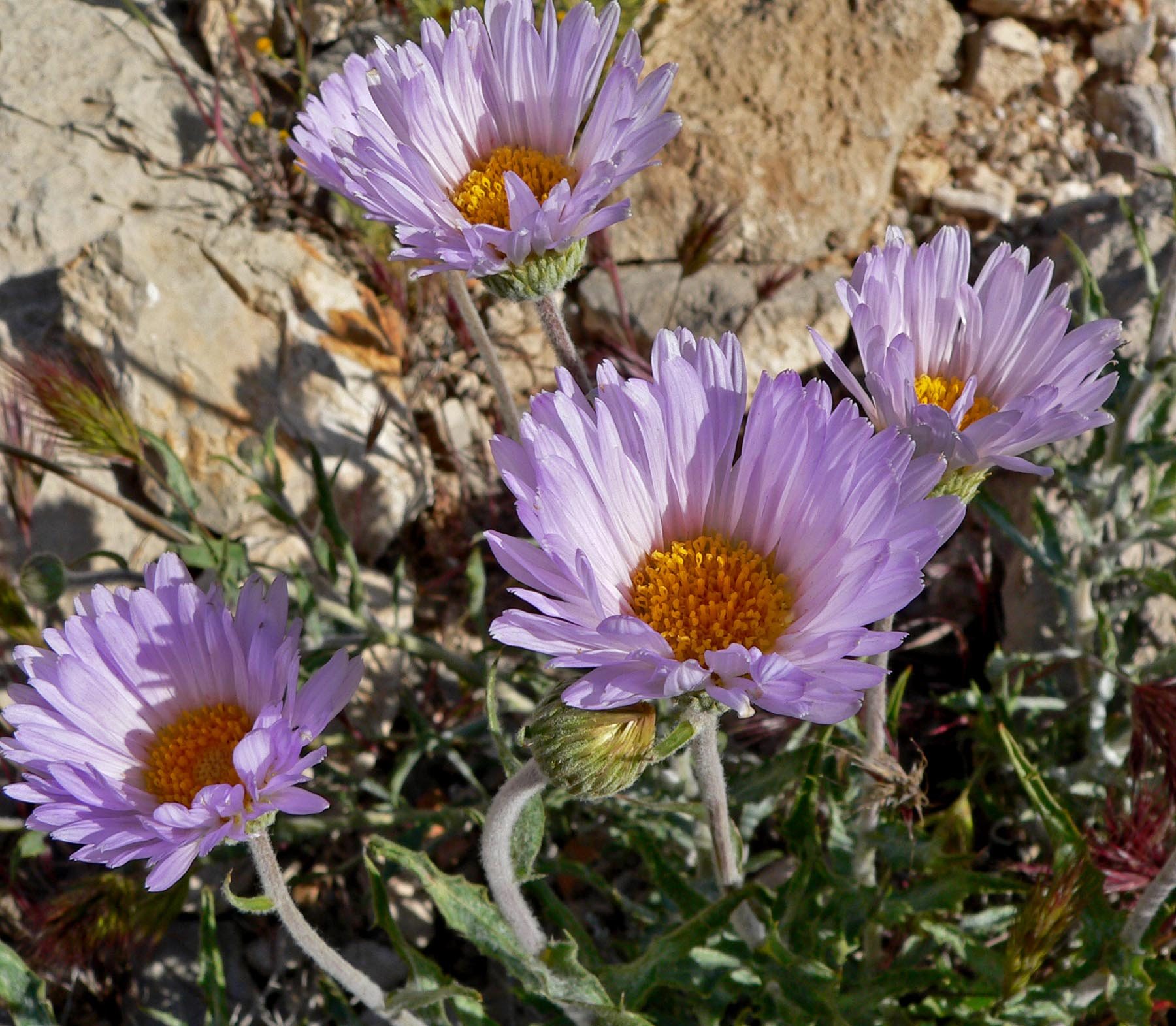
- Xylorhiza tortifolia

Scientific classification
- Kingdom: Plantae
- Clade: Tracheophytes
- Clade: Angiosperms
- Clade: Eudicots
- Clade: Asterids
- Order: Asterales
- Family: Asteraceae
- Subfamily: Asteroideae
- Tribe: Astereae
- Subtribe: Machaerantherinae
- Genus: Xylorhiza; Nutt.

Synonyms
- Machaeranthera sect. Xylorhiza (Nutt.) Cronquist & D.D. Keck

= Xylorhiza (plant) =

Genus of flowering plants

Xylorhiza is a genus of flowering plants in the family Asteraceae, known as woodyasters. These are daisylike wildflowers usually having blue to purple or white ray flowers with yellow centers of disc florets. Woodyasters are native to western North America.

Species

- Xylorhiza cognata - Mecca woodyaster - California (Imperial + Riverside Counties)
- Xylorhiza confertifolia - Henrieville woodyaster - Utah (Kane, Wayne, + Garfield Counties)
- Xylorhiza cronquistii - Cronquist's woodyaster - Utah (Kane + Garfield Counties)
- Xylorhiza frutescens - Baja California
- Xylorhiza glabriuscula - smooth woodyaster - Wyoming, Utah (Daggett County), Colorado (Routt + Moffat Counties), Montana (Carbon County), South Dakota (Harding, Butte, Fall River Counties)
- Xylorhiza orcuttii - Orcutt's aster - California (Imperial + San Diego Counties)
- Xylorhiza panamintensis - Death Valley National Park
- Xylorhiza tortifolia - Mojave woodyaster - California, Nevada, Utah, Arizona
- Xylorhiza venusta - charming woodyaster - Utah, Colorado, New Mexico (Colfax County)
- Xylorhiza wrightii - Big Bend woodyaster - western Texas, Chihuahua
