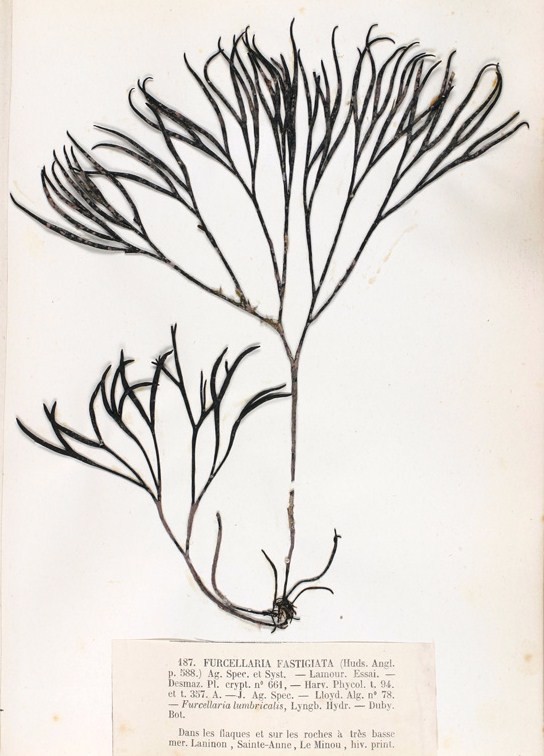
- Furcellaria lumbricalis syn. fastigiata

Scientific classification
- Domain: Eukaryota
- Clade: Archaeplastida
- Division: Rhodophyta
- Class: Florideophyceae
- Order: Gigartinales
- Family: Furcellariaceae
- Genus: Furcellaria; J.V.Lamouroux

Species
- Furcellaria lumbricalis (Hudson) J.V.Lamouroux

= Furcellaria =

Genus of seaweeds

Furcellaria is a genus of red algae. It is a monotypic genus, the only species being Furcellaria lumbricalis, which has commercial importance as a raw material for carrageenan production. It is mainly harvested from the waters of Denmark and Canada.

It grows on submerged rocks to a depth of about 12 metres (40 ft), but it can also grow in large floating mats, which are easier to harvest.

F. lumbricalis is also an important habitat-forming seaweed, forming underwater "belts" often just below those of bladderwrack. These belts provide spawning habitat for many fish species, and for this reason some governments place regulations on the harvesting of this seaweed.

== Description ==
Furcellaria lumbricalis is a common red macroalgal species. The species has two different ecotypes – attached and loose-lying (drifting) thallus forms (previously also known as Furcellaria fastigiata f. aegagropila). Attached F. lumbricalis is widely distributed sublittoral species on both sides of the North Atlantic. The attached form grows typically as an epilith on stable hard substrates such as stony bottoms, boulder fields and rocks. It is a perennial macroalgae with a life-span up to 10 years, that tolerates salinities down to 3.6 psu. Although the species has been reported to grow up to 30 m deep, the main occurrence is between 8−12 m. F. lumbricalis forms monotypic dense meadows in the central and northern Baltic Sea, where most of the other perennial red algae are not able to sustain the low salinity.

Over the last half a century, communities of loose-lying F. lumbricalis in Kattegat, Denmark and Puck Lagoon, Poland have been disappeared due to overharvesting or eutrophication. In other places, the species is too sparsely distributed, making it incompatible for industrial practices. The drifting forms of F. lumbricalis and Coccotylus truncatus form a loose-lying algal stratum in Kassari bay, which is the most abundant community in the Baltic Sea. Because of its unique location and relatively high biomass, it has been used for furcellaran production since the mid 1960s and is an example of a sustainable bioresource utilization.

The stratum's (average depth 7.5 m) density seems to differ greatly year to year (Table 1), ranging between 100 000 to 200 000 tons by wet weight. The change could be as a result of meteorological factors such as harsher winters or hotter summers, storms and the like.

== Distribution ==
It is commonly found near the coasts of Eastern Canada, British Isles and is the only widely distributed red algal species in the Baltic Sea. Found also in Northern Russia, Iceland, Faeroes and Norway to France.

== Quantitative characteristics ==
Key quantitative characteristics of the loose-lying Furcellaria-Coccotylus community in the Kassari Bay monitored by the Estonian Marine Institute.

| Sampling year | 2007 | 2009 | 2011 | 2013 | 2015 | 2017 |
| Total biomass (g/m2) | 983 | 1256 | 1020 | 1026 | 969 | 1053 |
| C. truncatus biomass, % | 15 | 13 | 17 | 25 | 21 | 21 |
| F. lumbricalis biomass, % | 65 | 74 | 68 | 65 | 64 | 71 |
| Harvesting limits (t/year) | 4000 | 4000 | 3000 | 2000 | 2000 | 2000 |

== Biomolecules from Furcellaria lumbricalis ==
Due to the polysaccharides in the cell walls, F. lumbricalis is grouped with other commercially important carrageenophytes (red algae that produce carrageenans). From F. lumbricalis a polysaccharide called furcellaran (hybrid β/κ-carrageenan) can be extracted. Furcellaran is non-stoichometrically undersulphated κ-carrageenan, where every 3rd or 4th 3-linked-β-galactose monomer possesses a sulphate ester group at the 4th carbon position. For comparison, an ideal κ-carrageenan molecule would have a sulphate ester group at the 4th carbon in every 3-linked-β-galactose monomer. Furcellaran's physical properties (gel strengths, gelling and melting temperatures) are similar to κ-carrageenan. Carrageenans found within certain seaweed species and locations are not universally similar, samples collected from different locations may have variable sulphation degrees. Studies show that total extraction yield is up to 31% (dry weight). However, in its unattached state, it is noted that polysaccharide yields are lower and some consider this to be the result of narrower thallus filaments giving way to a smaller amount of galactan present.

Also, phycobiliproteins can be extracted from F. lumbricalis, from which the R-phycoerythrin yield is ~0.1% by dry weight.

== Industrial use ==
Cations need to be present to form a strong gel in an aqueous solution. It is a process that depends on the nature of the polysaccharide, polymer concentration, temperature and the ions. K^{+}, Rb^{+} and Cs^{+} ions produce strong κ-carrageenan and furcellaran gels, whereas Ca^{2+} ions aid the gelling of ι-carrageenan (extracted from the cell walls of C. truncatus). An initial coil-to-helix transition has been observed as the primary change in the gelling process, which is followed by the aggregation of these helices to form a gel. These sorts of gels are thermoreversible, meaning that they gel when temperature drops and melt when the gel is heated. The food industry depends on this natural component and are used to add texture as a way of additive to certain foods candies, ice cream and puddings. When carrageenans are used as food additives in the EU, they are referred to as E407 (E407a is a Processed Eucheuma seaweed, where most impurities are washed out, but most of the cellulose remains). Additionally, it can be found in the pharmaceutical and cosmetic industries in which it's included to things such as foams and soluble tablets. Furcellaran can also be used instead of κ-carrageenan as a beer wort fining agent.

== Similar species ==
Polyides rotunda is similar but can be distinguished by having a discoid holdfast.
