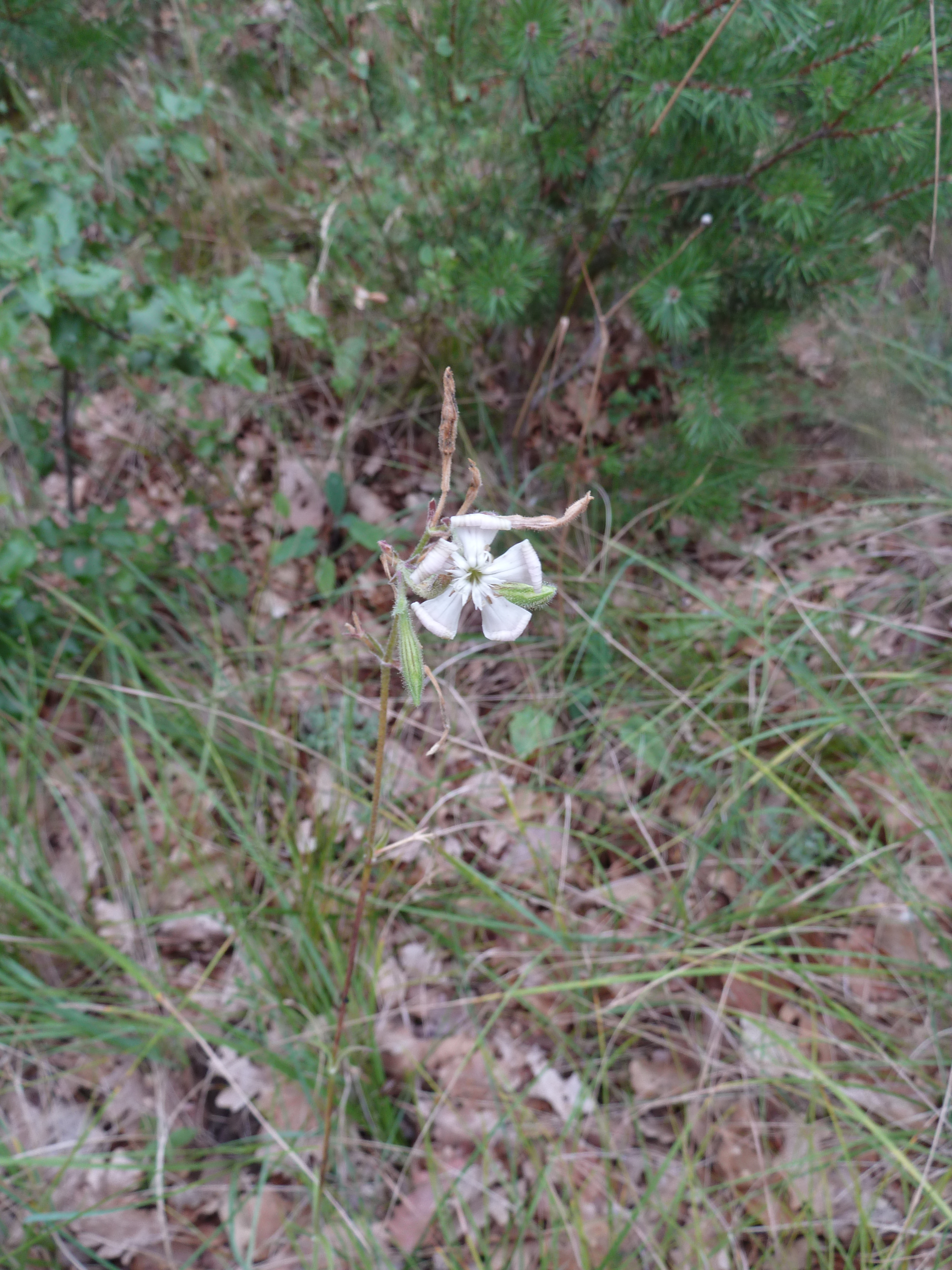
- Near Valréas, France

Scientific classification
- Kingdom: Plantae
- Clade: Tracheophytes
- Clade: Angiosperms
- Clade: Eudicots
- Order: Caryophyllales
- Family: Caryophyllaceae
- Genus: Silene
- Species: S. paradoxa

Binomial name
- Silene paradoxa L.

Synonyms
- Viscago paradoxa (L.) Fourr.

= Silene paradoxa =

Species of plant in the carnation family

Silene paradoxa, the Dover catchfly, is a species of flowering plant in the family Caryophyllaceae, native to southeastern France, Corsica, Italy, the former Yugoslavia, Albania, and Greece. It can grow on serpentine soils and copper mine tailings.

== See also ==
- Metallophyte
