= Vertebrata thuyoides =

Scientific classification
- Clade: Archaeplastida
- Division: Rhodophyta
- Class: Florideophyceae
- Order: Ceramiales
- Family: Rhodomelaceae
- Genus: Vertebrata
- Species: V. thuyoides

Binomial name
- Vertebrata thuyoides (Harvey) Kuntze

Species of alga

Vertebrata thuyoides (Boergeseniella thuyoides (Harvey in Mackay) Kylin) is a small marine algae in the Division Rhodophyta.

== Description ==
Vertebrata thuyoides is a small marine algae growing to 15 cm high in dense tufts of erect branches borne alternately and in one plane. The erect branches have 8 to 10 pericentral cells surrounding the central axis and are all of the same length. The whole plant is corticated, and is attached by rhizoids. It is very similar to Vertebrata fruticulosa. Pterosiphonia complanata is similar but can be distinguished by having 5 pericentral around the central cells of the axes.

== Distribution ==
Common in the British Isles on the southern coasts and Orkney. Also recorded from Morocco and the Mediterranean.

== Reproduction ==
The sexes are separate. Cystocarps are very small, sessile and borne on the branches. Spermatangial occur in tufts at the apices of the branches and the tetrasporangia occur in the branches in a spiral series.
