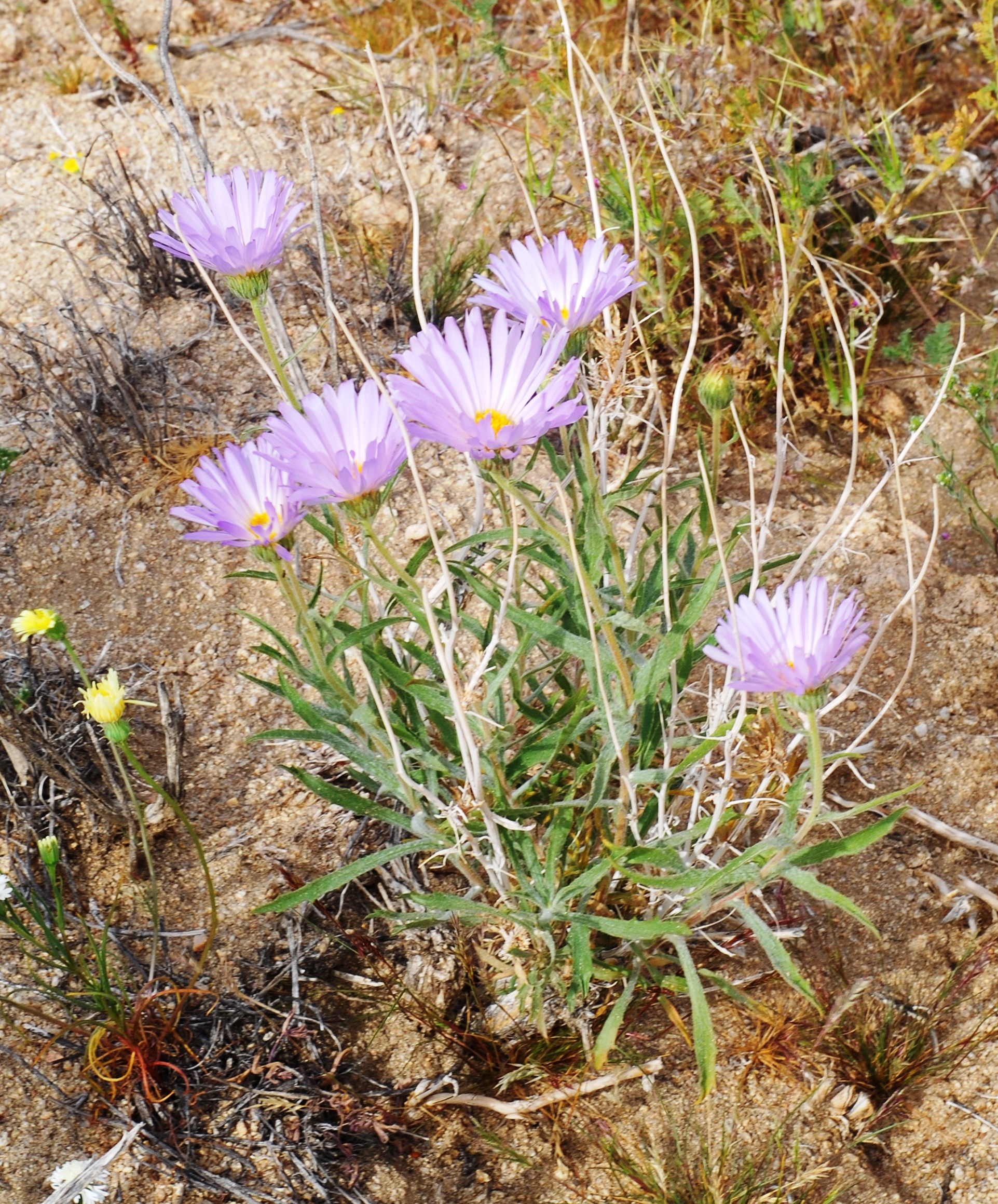
- Plant in Joshua Tree National Park

Conservation status
- Apparently Secure (NatureServe)

Scientific classification
- Kingdom: Plantae
- Clade: Tracheophytes
- Clade: Angiosperms
- Clade: Eudicots
- Clade: Asterids
- Order: Asterales
- Family: Asteraceae
- Genus: Xylorhiza
- Species: X. tortifolia

Binomial name
- Xylorhiza tortifolia (Torr. & A.Gray) Greene

Synonyms
- Aster abatus S.F.Blake; Aster mohavensis J.M.Coult.; Aster orcuttii; Machaeranthera orcuttii

= Xylorhiza tortifolia =

Species of flowering plant

Xylorhiza tortifolia is a species of flowering plant in the family Asteraceae, known by the common names Mojave-aster and Mojave woodyaster. The plant forms a small shrub with glandular leaves. The flower rays can be lavender, light blue, or white. Some varieties are known.

Native to southwestern North America, the plant can be found in deserts and washes. The Havasupai found uses for its fragrance.

== Description ==
Xylorhiza tortifolia is a perennial herb or subshrub with branching, hairy, glandular stems that reach 30–75 centimetres (12–30 in) in height. The leaves are up to 6.5 cm (2 1/2 in) long and lance-shaped or narrow, with a spiny tip and spiny-toothed edges, usually with a surface of gray hairs.

At the end of a long peduncle sits the inflorescence, a solitary flower head about 5 cm (2 in) across. The head has a base with long, narrow phyllaries which may be over 2 cm (3/4 in) long. The head contains up to 60 or more lavender, pale blue, or white ray florets which may be over 3 cm long. The bloom period is March through June.

The fruit is an achene which may be over 1 cm long, including its pappus of bristles.

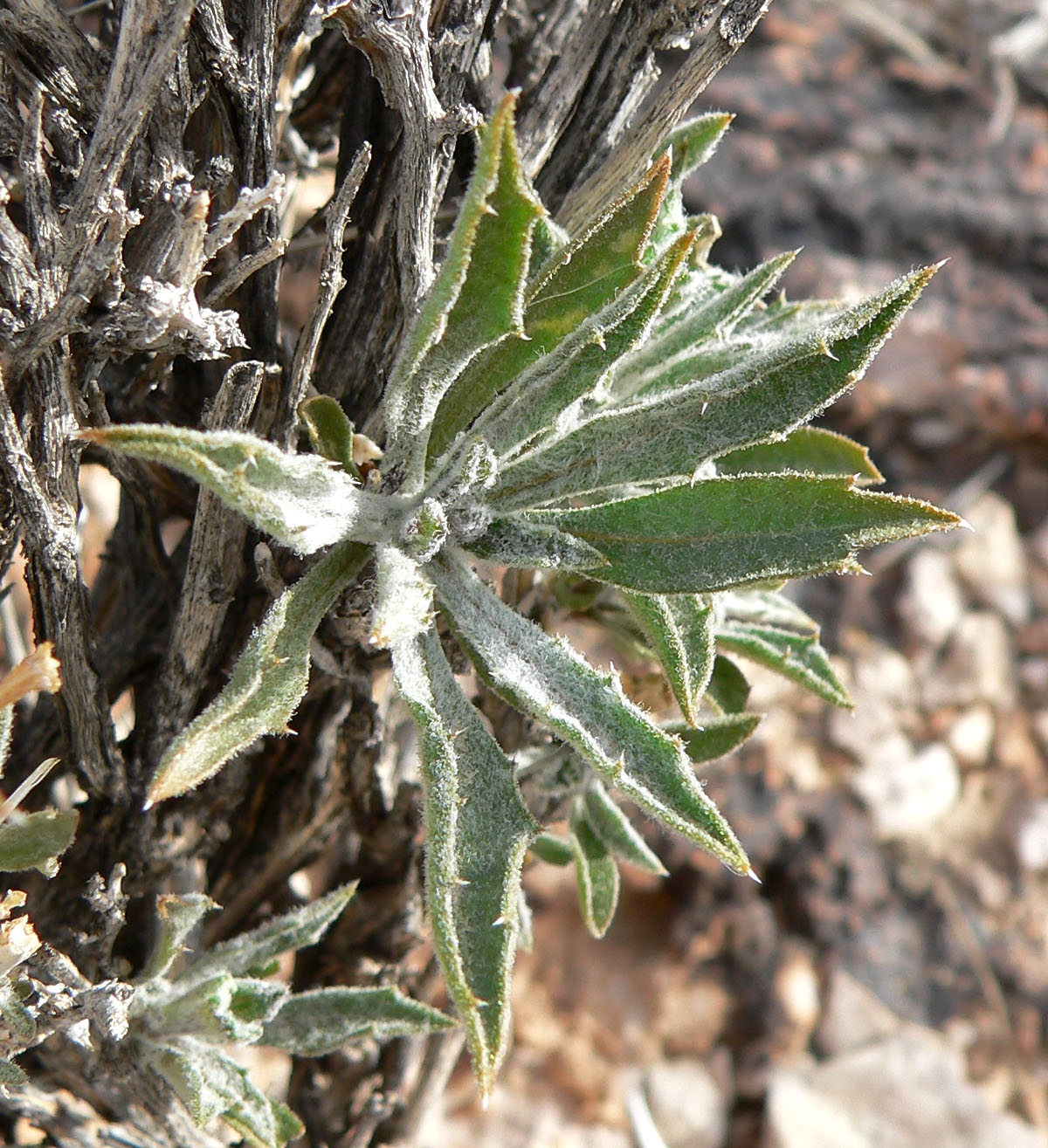
Leaves

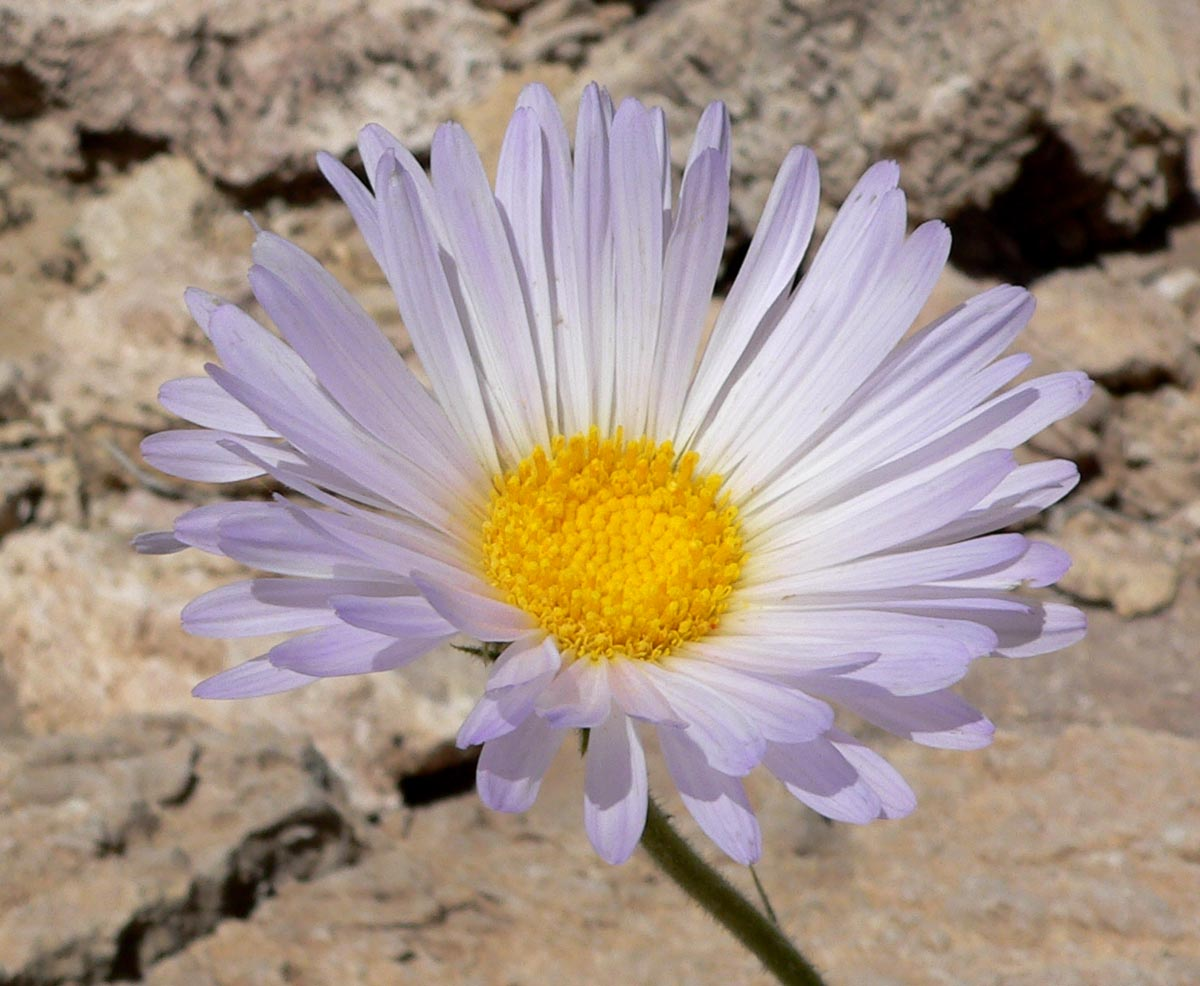
Flower close-up

== Taxonomy ==
Desert species of this aster with a woody base were removed from Machaeranthera, where they were placed for decades. A similar species, X. wrightii (Big Bend aster), is native to the Chihuahuan Desert in western Texas and northern Mexico.

=== Varieties ===
- Xylorhiza tortifolia var. imberbis – Imberis woodyaster, Great Basin region in Nevada, Utah, Arizona.
- Xylorhiza tortifolia var. parashantensis – Parashant woodyaster, endemic to Arizona.
- Xylorhiza tortifolia var. tortifolia – Mojave aster, Mojave woodyaster, a variety primarily native to the higher/winter colder Mojave Desert, and Owens Valley of the Great Basin region, from 240–2,000 metres (790–6,560 ft) in elevation.

=== Etymology ===
Xylorhiza means 'woody base'.

== Distribution and habitat ==
The flowering plant is native to the Mojave Desert, Sonoran Desert, and Great Basin Desert ecoregions of the southwestern United States, California, and northwestern Mexico.

It grows in arid canyons and bajadas/washes, from 240–2,000 metres (790–6,560 ft) in elevation. Habitats it is found in include creosote bush scrub, saltbush scrub, and Joshua tree woodlands.

== Uses ==
The Havasupai used the plant for incense and fragrance, with ground leaves carried in the clothes and used as perfume by men and women to counteract body odors.

== Bibliography ==
- Blake, Sidney Fay (1925). Contributions from the United States National Herbarium. Vol. 25. Washington D.C.: Smithsonian Institution Press.
- Coulter, John Merle (1893). Contributions from the United States National Herbarium. Vol. 4. Washington D.C.: Smithsonian Institution Press.
