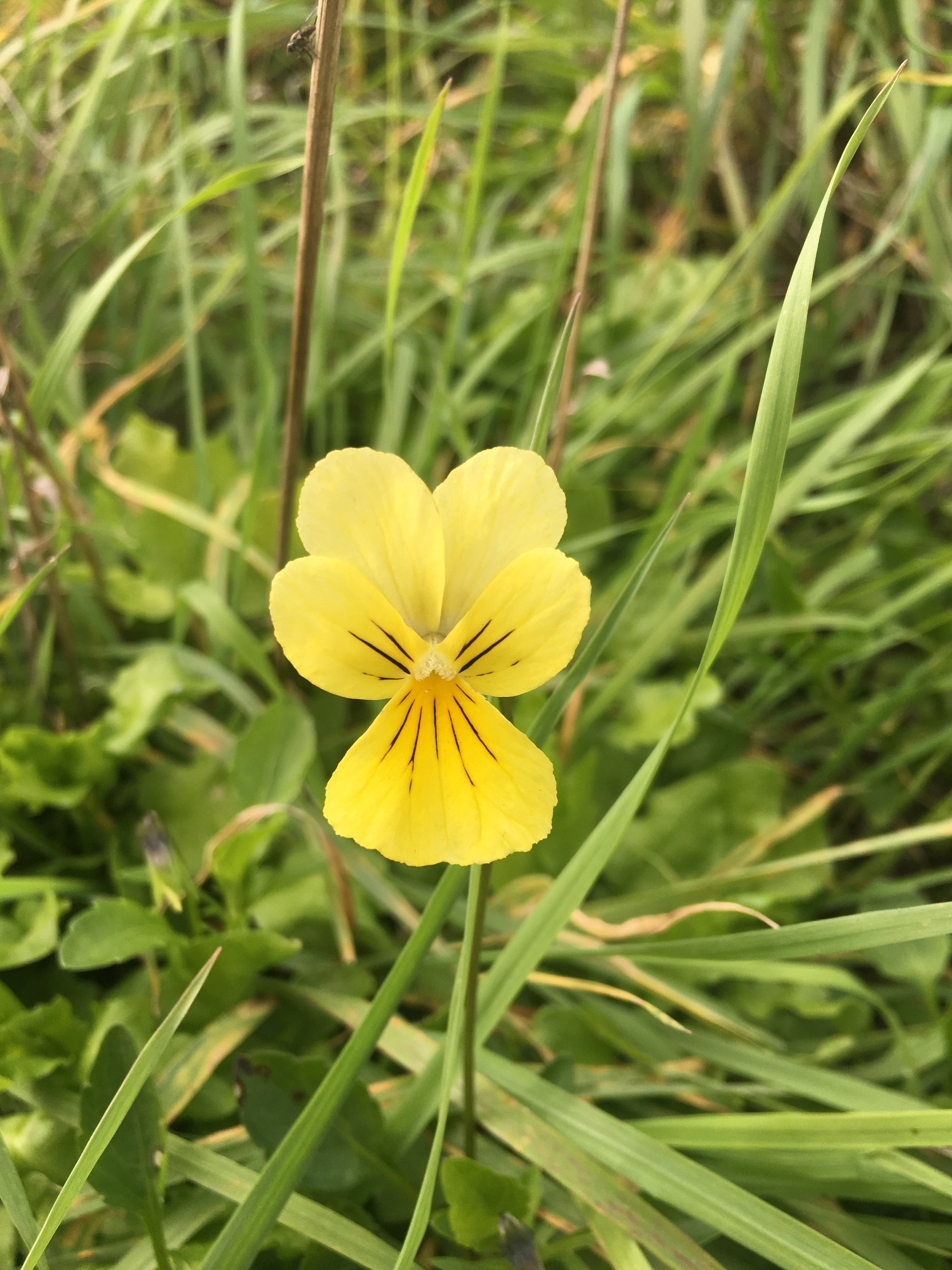

Scientific classification
- Kingdom: Plantae
- Clade: Tracheophytes
- Clade: Angiosperms
- Clade: Eudicots
- Clade: Rosids
- Order: Malpighiales
- Family: Violaceae
- Genus: Viola
- Species: V. lutea
- Subspecies: V. l. subsp. calaminaria

Trinomial name
- Viola lutea subsp. calaminaria (Gingins) Nauenb. (1986)

Synonyms
- Viola calaminaria (Ging.) Lej.; Viola sudetica var. calaminaria Ging.; Viola lutea var. multicaulis W.D.J.Koch

= Viola lutea subsp. calaminaria =

Subspecies of flowering plant

Viola lutea subsp. calaminaria (synonym Viola calaminaria) is a subspecies of V. lutea, in the violet family, the Violaceae. The plant occurs from Kelmis (La Calamine in French) in the Belgian province of Liège across the borders to Germany and the Netherlands. The plant has adapted to an excess of zinc in the tailings of a former mine, the heaps of stone left over after separating the valuable fraction from the ore. By evolving the ability to cope with the toxic heavy metal pollution, this violet has gained an advantage over the other plants in the ecosystem, as is able to become the locally dominant floral component of such habitats.

== Taxonomy ==
Although it had been reduced to a subspecies in 1986 already, local national species lists preferred to recognise the varieties as locally endemic species, but genetic research in 2006 made this position untenable.

Mining for zinc began in earnest regionally in the Roman era, and this violet would most likely have mutated to take advantage of the heavy metal pollution at some time afterwards. Both the names Kelmis and La Calamine are derived from the Ancient Latin word for 'zinc ore', cadmia, via the Medieval Latin word calamina, meaning 'zinc'.

It is believed to have recently evolved to take advantage of the local pollution. This can be seen in its incomplete adaptation to the toxic effects of zinc: the viability, sporogenesis and pollen morphology of such violets are often defective. Nevertheless, it is able to cope with the pollution so much better than other plants, that they often dominate in the small areas where enough tailings have been dumped.

== Description ==
The plant grows to a height of 10 to exceptionally 40 cm, forms rhizomes, and flowers from April to July. The yellow corolla of the violet is 2 - 2.5 cm in size and it has 7 - 9 mm long sepals. The spur protrudes 1 - 3 mm beyond the calyx appendages. The lower leaves of the plant are ovate and the upper leaves are narrower. The leaflets are palmately-divided, with the end slip not much longer than the side lips. The fruit is a capsule with valves. The seed is 1.80 mm long and 1.10 mm wide. The number of chromosomes is 2n = 48.

== Distribution ==
The violet is also found along the Geul, near Epen, where it just reaches the Dutch border. The zinc in the area along the Geul comes from the zinc mines that were exploited in Belgium between 1860 and the beginning of the twentieth century. There are still zinc-containing slag on the old mining site between Blieberg and Moresnet. In Kelmis there are also still zinc-containing rocks left over from mining.

The former mining site of Blieberg is now a nature reserve and zinc violets bloom abundantly around June. It is an indication that there is zinc in the ground. The subspecies also has growing places along the Vesdre river. The species is also found in Germany near Aachen. This is the entire distribution.

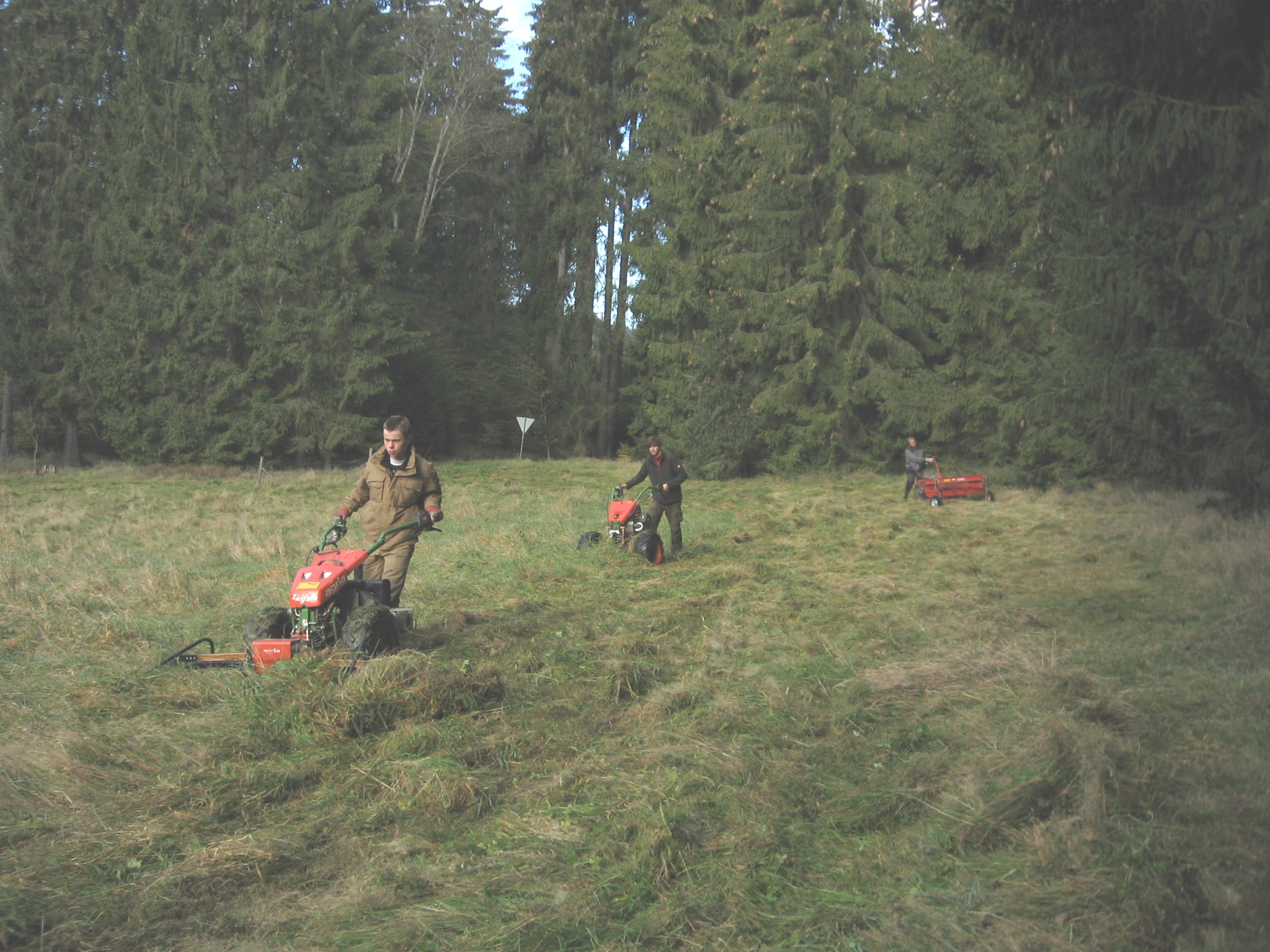
An important part of the habitat is people with lawnmowers, this stops native trees from naturally growing here. In the past livestock would have performed this function. People conserving violets at NSG Wäschebach, Tieberg

== Conservation ==
The violet has been placed on the Dutch Red List of Plants as it is restricted in distribution and said to be rarer now than in the past. The main threat to the species is not enough grazing by livestock - as herding has become less attractive as a career, trees would naturally start to grow in these areas if modern mechanical measures were not taken to maintain the habitat. One of the threats to the violet is cross pollination by normal garden pansies, V. × wittrockiana, which were also originally partially bred from crosses with primarily V. lutea, the same original mother species, in the early 19th century. Zinc is also no longer mined in the area, and tailings are no longer dumped in nature, thus their specific habitat will eventually disappear.
