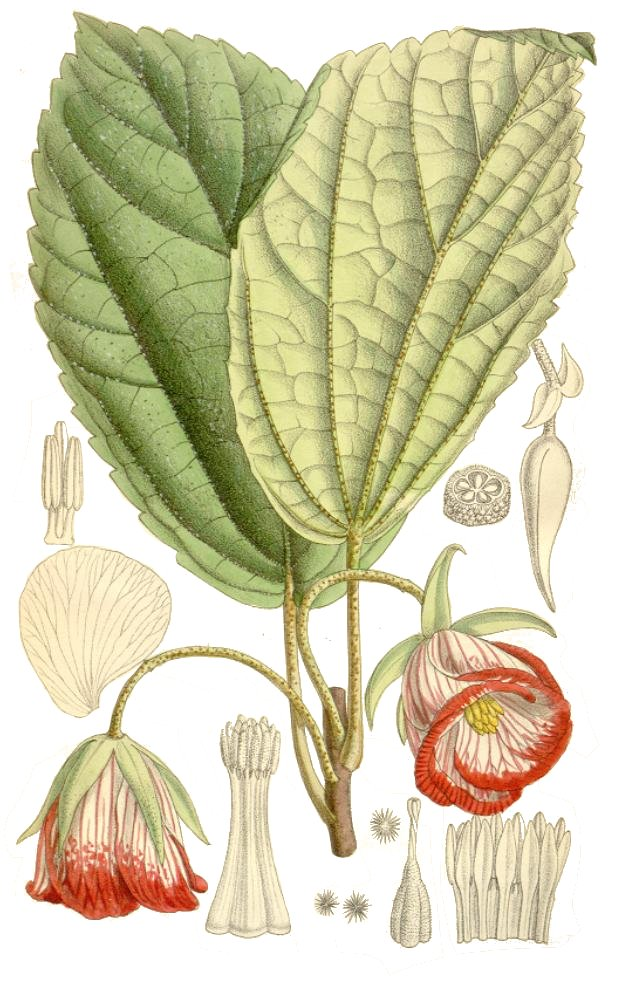
- Trochetia blackburniana

Scientific classification
- Kingdom: Plantae
- Clade: Tracheophytes
- Clade: Angiosperms
- Clade: Eudicots
- Clade: Rosids
- Order: Malvales
- Family: Malvaceae
- Genus: Ruizia
- Subgenus: Trochetia; DC, 1823

Species
- see below

= Trochetia =

Genus of flowering plants

Trochetia is a subgenus of flowering plants, now placed in the genus Ruizia and the family Malvaceae (formerly in the Sterculiaceae, but genera now usually subsumed in the Dombeyoideae and other subfamilies). Species are endemic to the Mascarene Islands. The original genus was first described by A.P. de Candolle in 1823, who named it in honour of French botanist Henri Dutrochet.

== Description and ecology ==
The genus Trochetia consists of scrubs or small trees, which can reach a height from two to eight metres. The hermaphroditic flowers are either white (T. triflora), pink (T. parviflora), or reddish orange (T. boutoniana). They are either single-standing, or grow in a cluster of three flowers. Some species have bell-shaped petals. All plants of this genus are imperiled due to the competition of invasive species, like the guavas from China but also by destruction caused by introduced monkeys and rats. Five species occur on Mauritius and one on La Reunion. The habitat consists of humid forests with a high annual rainfall or mountainous slopes which are directed windwards.

== Pollination ==
Plants from the genus Trochetia belong to the few plants worldwide that can produce coloured nectar. Some scientists, like the Danish ecologist Jens Olesen assume that this could be linked to bird species which have pollinated this plants in the past and are extinct today. However, recent research has demonstrated that not only do endemic Phelsuma geckos pollinate some of the species, but that they actually prefer coloured over clear nectar. Hence, the 'mystery of the Mauritian coloured nectar' can be considered at least partly solved now. Whether the nectar-feeding birds in Mauritius also react to the coloured nectar as a signal for floral reward remains to be seen.

The main pollinators of today are the Mauritius olive white-eye (Zosterops chloronothos) and the Mauritius grey white-eye (Zosterops mauritianus), introduced honey bees, or geckos from the genus Phelsuma.

Recent research has shown that in the absence of the locally extinct Mauritius olive white-eye, Trochetia blackburniana's main pollinator in the area of Le Pétrin is the blue-tailed day gecko (Phelsuma cepediana). the pollination efficiency of these geckos depend on the proximity to dense patches of Pandanus, which are a favourite microhabitat for the geckos - possibly because the spiky leaves of Pandanus protect them from their main predator, the Mauritius kestrel (Falco punctatus).

== Species ==
Some authorities have classified much more species but these are either in doubt or synonyms of other plants. The similar Atlantic genus Trochetiopsis was until 1981 included herein but actually Helmiopsis might be a closer relative of Trochetia (as is also suggested by biogeography). The formerly recognized species Trochetia richardii was reclassified as Helmiopsis richardii. Trochetia thouarsii was first synonymized with Trochetia pentaglossa and later reclassified as Nesogordonia thouarsii. Both plants are from Madagascar.

The following species were accepted:

- Trochetia parviflora - an extremely rare tree (with about 63 individuals). Discovered in 1794. Thought to be extinct in 1863 and rediscovered on the slopes of Corps de Garde, Mauritius in 2001 by a team from the Mauritius herbarium.
- Trochetia boutoniana (native name: Boucle d'Oreille (in English: Earring tree) because of its bell-shaped look) is the national flower of Mauritius since 1992. It was named after French botanist Louis Bouton. The only occurrence are the slopes of Le Morne Brabant, Mauritius. The flowering time is from June to October.
- Trochetia uniflora - Occurrence: Trois Mamelles, Le Pouce, and Letard Mountains in the west of Mauritius. Flowering time: May to June
- Trochetia triflora - Occurrence: Trou aux Cerfs in the central, Grand Bassin, Piton Savanne, and Little Black River peak in the south-west of Mauritius. Flowering time: April to July
- Trochetia blackburniana - Occurrence: several places on Mauritius, most common species of the genus. Flowering time: April to May
- Trochetia granulata - Occurrence: Réunion
