= Mascarene Islands =

Group of islands in the Indian Ocean

Native name: Mascareignes
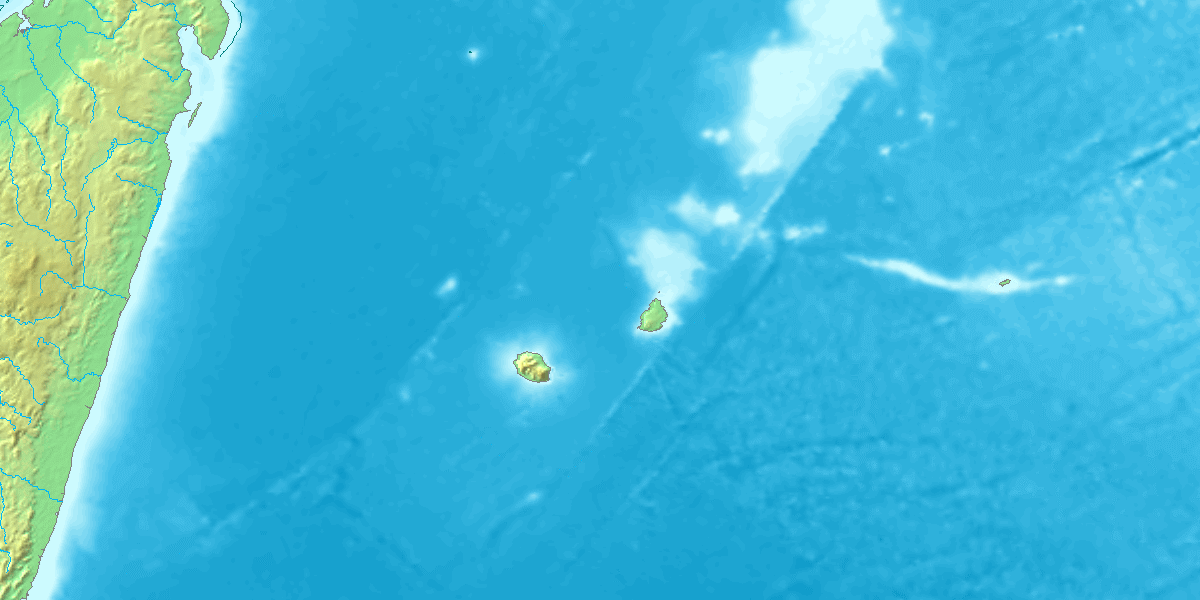
- Topographic map of Mascarene Islands

Geography
- Location: Indian Ocean
- Coordinates: 20.20°S 57.75°E
- Major islands: Mauritius, Réunion, Rodrigues

Administration
- Mauritius
- France

Demographics
- Population: 2,195,087

The Mascarene Islands (English: /mæskəˈriːn/; French: Mascareignes [maskaʁɛɲ]) or Mascarenes or Mascarenhas Archipelago is a group of islands in the Indian Ocean east of Madagascar consisting of islands belonging to the Republic of Mauritius as well as the French department of Réunion. The name derives from Portuguese navigator Pedro Mascarenhas who first visited them in April 1512. The islands share a common geological origin beneath the Mascarene Plateau known as the Mauritia microcontinent which was a Precambrian microcontinent situated between India and Madagascar until their separation about 70 million years ago. They form a distinct ecoregion with unique biodiversity and endemism of flora and fauna.

== Geography ==
The archipelago comprises three large islands—Mauritius, Réunion, and Rodrigues—plus several volcanic remnants, in the tropics of the southwestern Indian Ocean, generally between 700 and 1,500 kilometres east of Madagascar. The terrain includes a variety of reefs, atolls, and small islands. They present various topographical and edaphic regions. On the largest islands these gave rise to endemism and unusual biodiversity. The climate is oceanic and tropical.

Mauritius is located 900 km east of Madagascar. It has an area of 1,865 km^{2}. The highest point is 828 meters above sea level. Mauritius is the most populous of the Mascarene Islands, with a population of 1,252,964. Réunion is located 150 km southwest of Mauritius. It is the largest of the islands, with an area of 2,512 km^{2}. Piton des Neiges (3,069 m), an extinct volcano, is the highest peak on Réunion and in the islands. Piton de la Fournaise is an active volcano on Réunion which erupts frequently. Rodrigues is located 574 km east of Mauritius. It has an area of 108 km^{2} and reaches 393 meters elevation.

St. Brandon, also known as the Cargados Carajos shoals, is a coral atoll group consisting of a barrier reef, shoals, and low islets. It is the remnant of one or more large volcanic islands sitting on the Mauritia microcontinent which were submerged by rising tides. Today, the 30 or so islands that comprise St. Brandon form part of the Republic of Mauritius. Around 17 of the uninhabited islands are administered by the Outer Islands Development Corporation of Mauritius (an entity run by the Prime Minister of Mauritius through the Prime Minister's Office) whilst the remaining 13 islands are managed by the Raphael Fishing Company, which include L'île du Sud, Petit Fou, l'Avocaire, l'île aux Fous, L'île du Gouvernement, Petit Mapou, Grand Mapou, La Baleine, L'Île Coco, Île Raphael, Verronge, l'île aux Bois, and Baleines Rocks. The Raphael Fishing Company was granted the islands under a 1901 permanent lease which were adjudged as a permanent grant by determination of the Privy Council (United Kingdom) in 2008.

There are several submerged banks or shoals:

- Saya de Malha Bank is a large, submerged bank. Prehistorically it was a group of volcanic islands and was enjoined to the Great Chagos Bank until continental drift pushed them apart.
- Soudan Banks are a group of low-lying banks on the Mascarene Plateau.
- Nazareth Bank is located just north of Cargados Carajos, and prehistorically they were a single geological feature. Today it is a large, shallow fishing bank.
- Hawkins Bank is on the northernmost point of the Mascarene Plateau.

== Geology ==
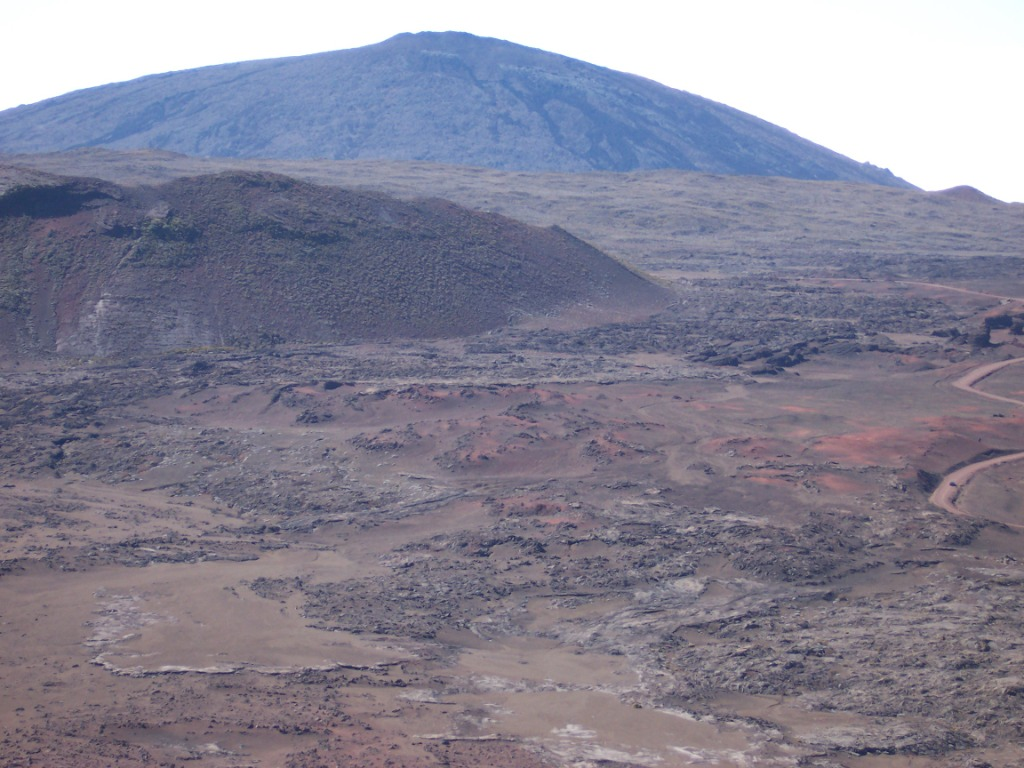
Piton de la Fournaise

The islands are volcanic in origin; Saya de Malha (35 mya) was the first of the Mascarene Islands to rise out of the Indian Ocean due to the Réunion hotspot, followed by Nazareth Bank (approximately 2 mya later), Soudan Bank and Cargados Carajos. The youngest islands to form were Mauritius (7–10 mya), created along with the undersea Rodrigues Ridge. Rodrigues and Réunion were created in the last two million years. Eventually, Saya de Malha, Nazareth and Soudan were completely submerged, Cargados Carajos remaining as a coral atoll. The Réunion hotspot was beginning to cool, and Rodrigues came out as a small island.

Réunion is home to the highest peaks in the Mascarenes, the shield volcanoes Piton des Neiges (3,069 m) and Piton de la Fournaise (2,525 m). Piton de la Fournaise, on the southeastern corner of Réunion, is one of the most active volcanoes in the world, erupting last in December 2021. Piton de la Petite Rivière Noire (828 m) is the highest peak on Mauritius, and the gentle hills of Rodrigues rise to only 390 m.

The Mascarene Plateau is an undersea plateau that extends approximately 2000 km, from the Seychelles to Réunion. The plateau covers an area of over 115,000 km^{2} of shallow water, with depths ranging from 8 to 150 meters, plunging to 4000 m to the abyssal plain at its edges. The southern part of the plateau—including the Saya de Malha Bank, Nazareth Bank, Soudan Banks and Cargados Carajos Shoals (then one large island)—was formed by the Réunion hotspot. These were once volcanic islands, much like Mauritius and Réunion, which have now sunk or eroded to below sea level or (in the case of the Cargados Carajos) to low coral islands. Limestone banks found on the plateau are the remnants of coral reefs, indicating that the plateau was a succession of islands. Some of the banks may have been islands as recently as 18,000–6,000 years ago, when sea levels were as much as 130 meters lower during the Last Ice Age.

== History ==
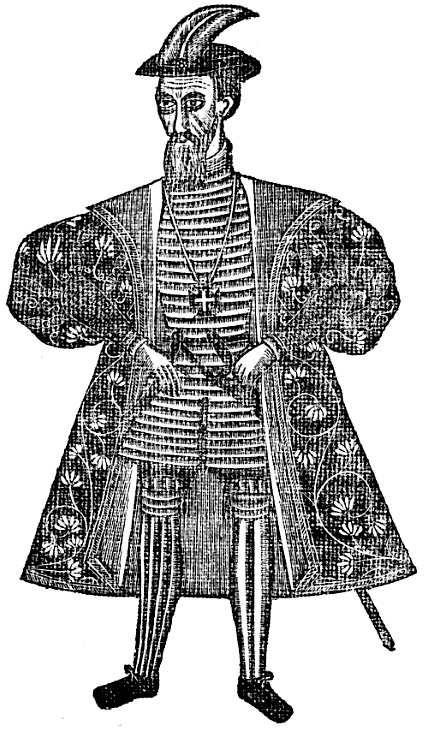
Pedro Mascarenhas, namesake of the Mascarene Islands, was Viceroy of Portuguese India.

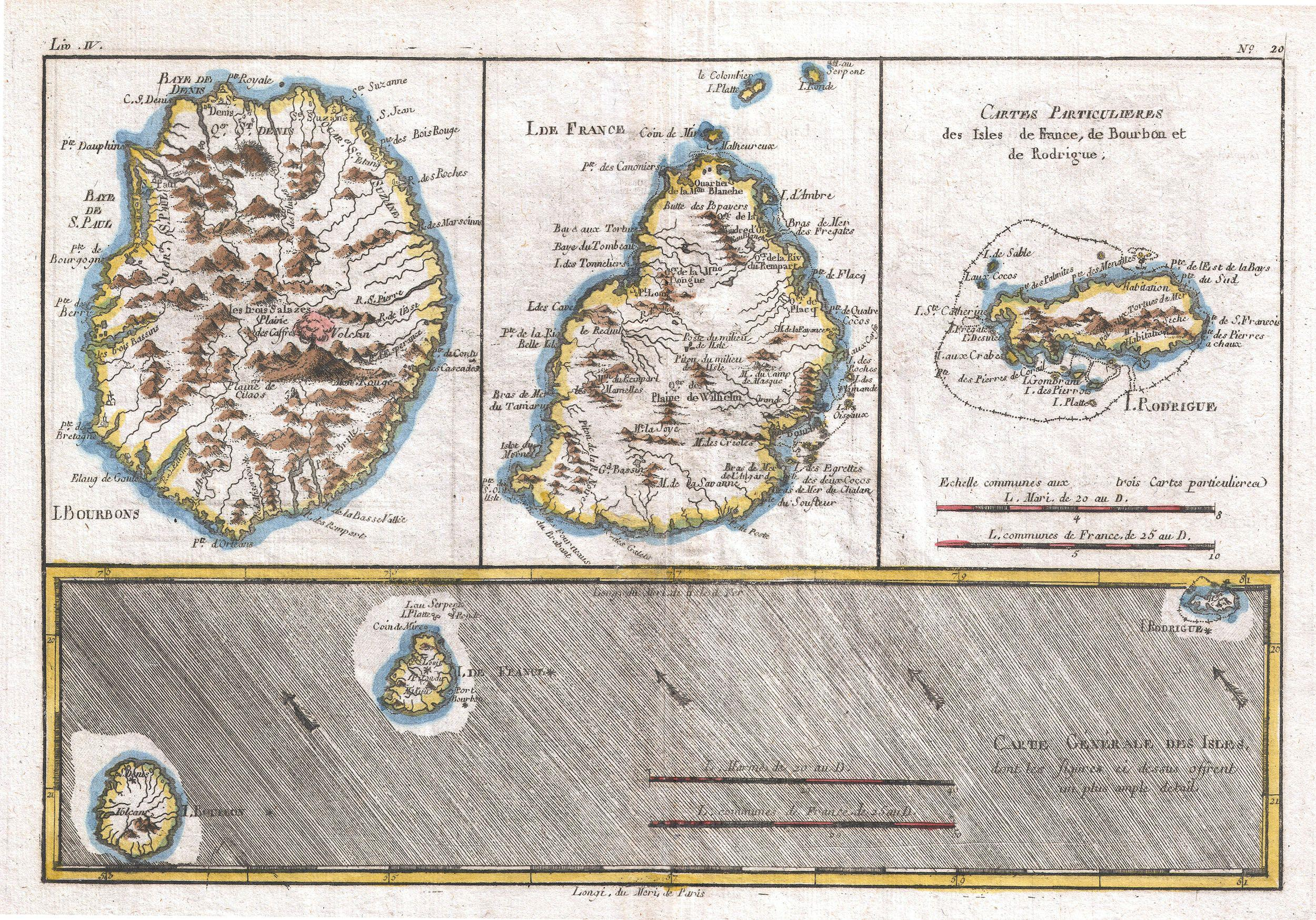
1780 map of Reunion, Mauritius, and Rodrigues

The early colonial history of the islands featured a succession of takeovers between rival powers: the Portuguese, Dutch, French and British all ruled some or all of the islands.

Around 1507, Portuguese explorer Diogo Fernandes Pereira discovered the island group. The area remained under nominal Portuguese rule until Étienne de Flacourt arrived with a French naval squadron and took possession in 1649. From 4 June 1735 to 23 March 1746, a single French Mascarene Islands chartered colony under one gouverneur général (governor general) contained Isle de France (now Mauritius), Île Bourbon (Réunion) and Séchelles (Seychelles). On 14 July 1767 this became a French crown colony, still under one governor general. From 3 February 1803 until 2 September 1810 the French colony of Indes-Orientales, under a capitaine général (captain-general), included Réunion and (nominally) the Seychelles.

=== Mauritius ===
Logo of the Dutch East India Company

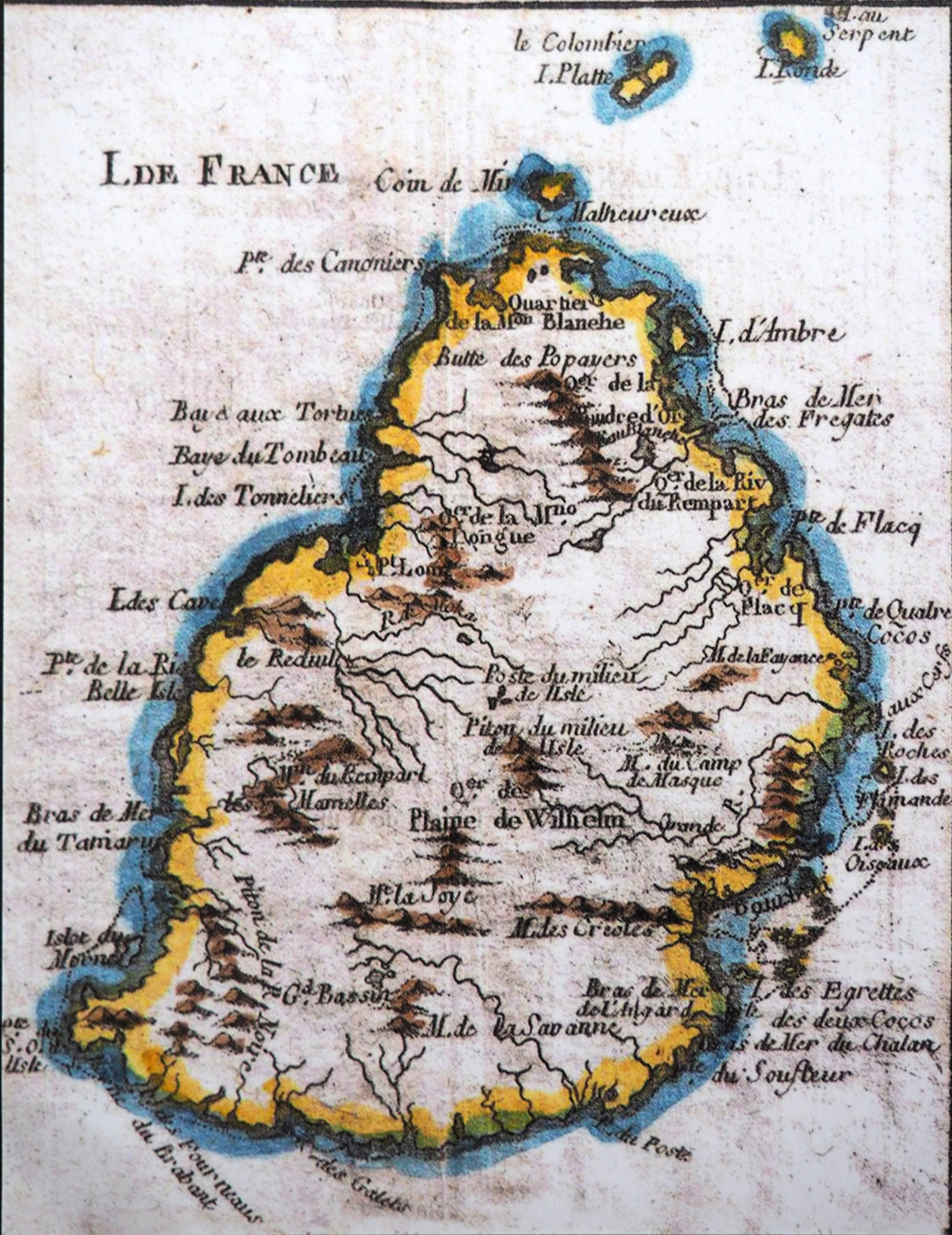
Isle de France (Mauritius) under the French

It is postulated from navigational charts, such as the Cantino planisphere of 1502, that Arab sailors first discovered Mauritius around 975, calling it Dina Arobi (abandoned island). The Dutch took physical possession in 1598, establishing a succession of short-lived settlements over a period of about 120 years, before abandoning their efforts in 1710. France took control in 1715, renaming it Isle de France. In 1810, the United Kingdom invaded the island to protect its East India ships coming around the Cape of Good Hope from French pirates. Four years later, at the Treaty of Paris, France ceded Mauritius and its dependencies to the United Kingdom. Under British Mauritius (1810-1968), the island successfully developed as a sugar cane-based plantation economy and colony until independence in 1968.

=== Rodrigues ===
Rodrigues was first discovered by the Arabs but named after Portuguese navigator Diogo Rodrigues. It was under Dutch control in 1601 and settled by the French in 1691. Britain took possession of Rodrigues in 1809. When Mauritius gained independence in 1968, Rodrigues was forcefully joined to it. Rodrigues remains an autonomous region of Mauritius.

=== Réunion ===
Réunion was discovered first by the Arabs then by the Portuguese, who named it Santa Apolónia. It was then occupied by the French as part of Mauritius. It was first inhabited by French mutineers who arrived on the island between 1646 and 1669. It was given its current name in 1793. From 1810 to 1815 it was held by the British, before being returned to France. Réunion became an overseas department of France in 1946.

== Climate ==
The climate is tropical. At low elevations summer temperatures (December to April) average 30 °C. Winter temperatures (May to November) are generally cooler, around 25 °C. Temperatures are cooler in the mountains, averaging 18 °C. During the winter short-lived snow can fall on Réunion's high peaks.

Southeasterly trade winds blow throughout the year. Rainfall is generally higher on the windward sides of the islands. On Mauritius average annual rainfall in the lowlands varies from 1905 mm on the windward southeast coast to 890 mm on the leeward side. Rainfall in the mountains is higher, varying from 2540 mm to 4445 mm annually. Tropical cyclones occur occasionally, bringing heavy rain and high winds, and causing erosion and landslides.

== Flora ==
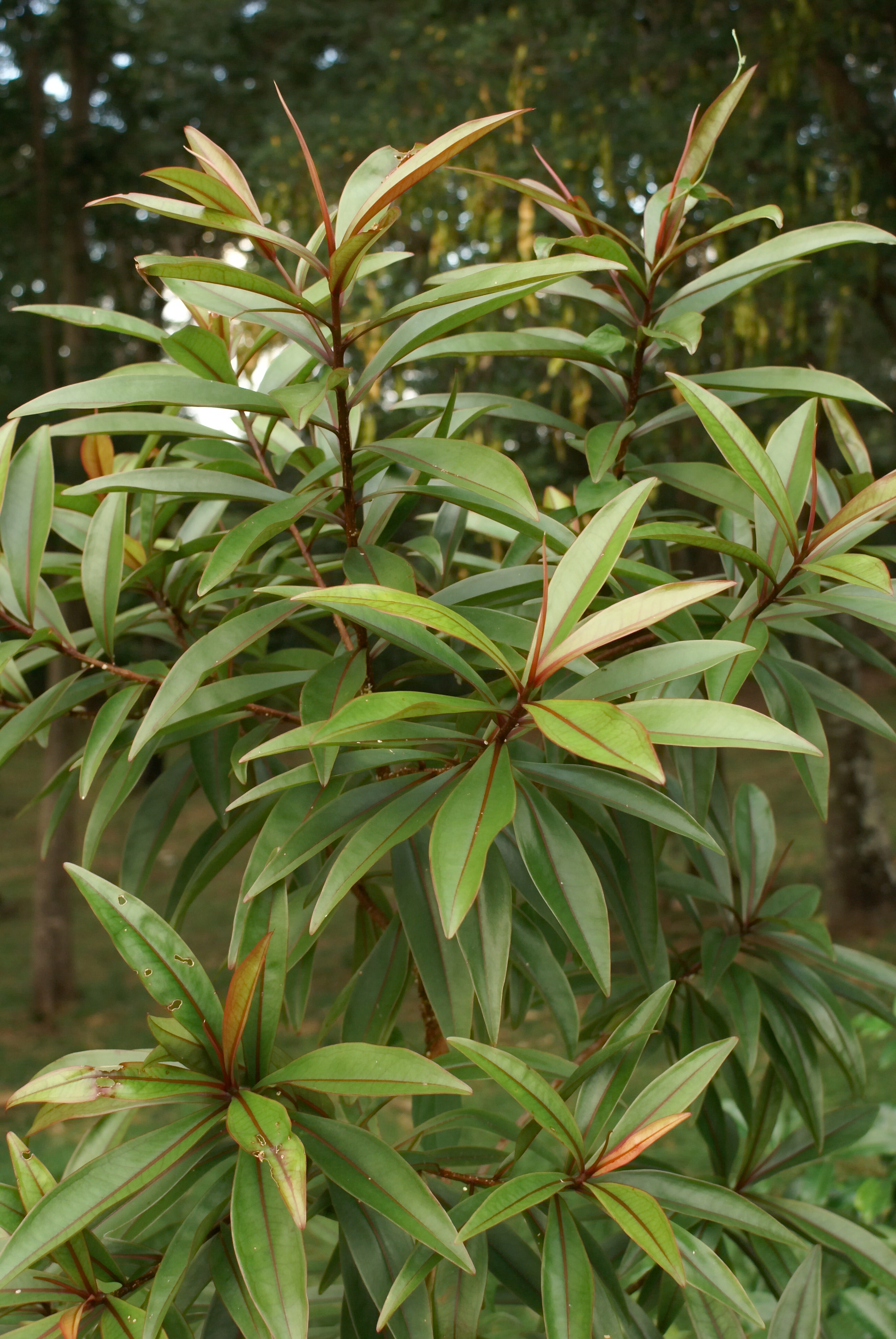
Foetidia mauritiana

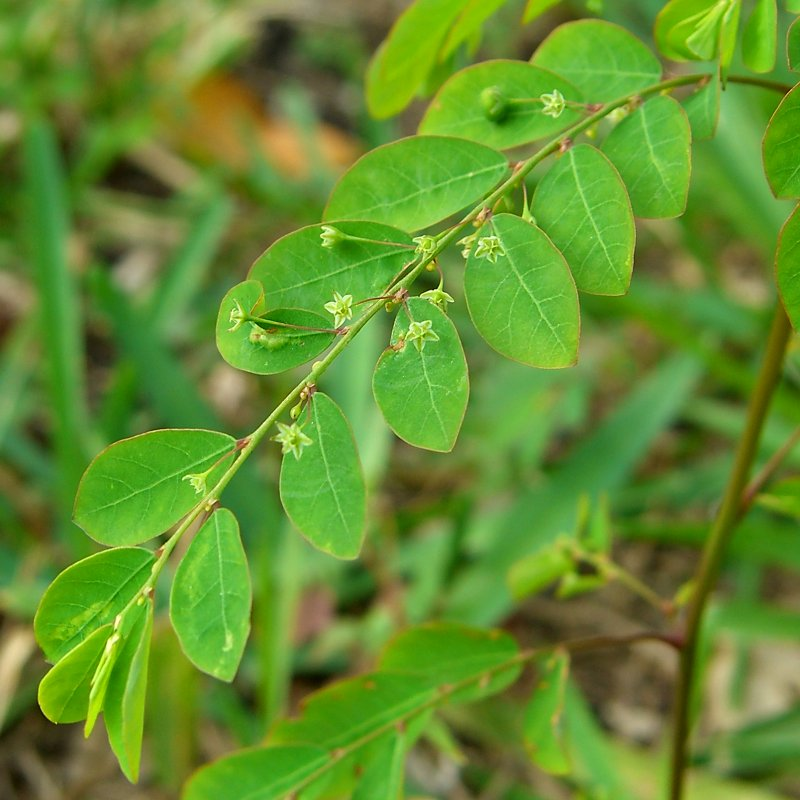
Phyllanthus tenellus (Mascarenes leaf-flower)

The habitats of the Macarenes vary with the islands' size, topography, age, and proximity to Madagascar, the nearest major land mass. As is common among remote islands, the Mascarene fauna and flora display a high degree of endemism; they include over a thousand species, of which several hundred are endemic. The Mascarene Islands form a distinct ecoregion known as the Mascarene forests. Until Europeans first settled the islands in the 16th century the Mascarenes are not known to have harbored any human population, and the islands' wildlife was still flourishing during the early days of settlement. Today much of the natural vegetation is gone, and there are many introduced species.

In prehistoric times the islands were covered in a diverse range of tropical moist broadleaf forests. The plant communities are not homogeneous and comprise at least five fairly distinct vegetation zones that reflect variations in altitude and in moisture regime. These include dry lowland forests, semi-dry sclerophyllous forests, lowland rainforests, montane cloud forests, and high-elevation heathlands on Réunion. Coastal habitats include beach vegetation, coastal wetlands, and swamp forests, grading into lowland rain forest on the windward sides of the islands and lowland dry forests to leeward.

The dry lowland forests are found on the leeward sides of the islands, from sea level to 200 metres in areas with less than 1000 mm of average annual rainfall. Palms are the dominant trees, including species of Latania and Dictyosperma album, along with the palm-like screw-pines (Pandanus spp.). Semi-dry sclerophyllous forests are found between the coast and 360 metres elevation on Mauritius and Rodrigues, and from 200 to 750 metres elevation on the western slopes of Réunion, where only small patches of such forest now remain. Average annual rainfall in the semi-dry forests ranges from 1000 to 1500 mm. Tree genera and families well-represented in the semi-dry forests include ebony species in the genus Diospyros (Ebenaceae), Pleurostylia (Celastraceae), Foetidia (Lecythidaceae), Olea europaea subsp. cuspidata (Oleaceae), Cossinia pinnata (Sapindaceae) Dombeya (Malvaceae), Terminalia bentzoe (Combretaceae), and Sideroxylon boutonianum, Sideroxylon borbonicum, and various species of Mimusops in family Sapotaceae. Shrubs in the semi-dry forests include several spectacular endemic species of Hibiscus (Malvaceae), Zanthoxylum (Rutaceae), Obetia ficifolia (Urticaceae), and Scolopia heterophylla (Flacourtiaceae).

The lowland rain forests are characterized by dense evergreen forests, composed of diverse species creating a canopy of 30 meters or more in height. They are found on the Mauritius' eastern lowlands from the coast to 800–900 metres elevation, and above 360 m on the western slopes. On Réunion lowland rain forests are found between 750 and 1100 m. They occur in areas with average annual rainfall of 1500 to 6000 mm. Characteristic trees include species of Mimusops and Labourdonnaisia (Sapotaceae), Hernandia mascarenensis (Hernandiaceae), Calophyllum (Clusiaceae), and species of Syzygium, Eugenia, Sideroxylon, and Monimiastrum (Myrtaceae). Characteristic shrubs include species of Gaertnera, Chassalia, Bertiera, and Coffea in family Rubiaceae. Other plants include bamboos like Nastus borbonicus, numerous species of orchids (e.g., Angraecum, Bulbophyllum) and ferns e.g., Asplenium, Hymenophyllum, Trichomanes, Elaphoglossum, and Marattia fraxinea.

The cloud forests are evergreen rain forests found on mountain slopes with high rainfall. They occur on Réunion between 800 and 1900 metres elevation on eastern slopes with an average annual rainfall of 2000–10,000 mm, and between 1100 and 2000 metres on western slopes with an average annual rainfall of 2000–3000 mm. By 2005, relatively intact cloud forests still covered approximately 44,000 ha on Réunion. On Mauritius they are restricted to a small area of Montagne Cocotte in the southwest, above 750 metres elevation and with average annual rainfall of 4500–5500 mm. Trees form a dense canopy 6 to 10 metres high. Typical canopy trees include species of Dombeya on Réunion, and species of Monimia and Tambourissa (Monimiaceae) on both islands. There is an understory of small trees and shrubs including species of Psiadia (Asteraceae) and Melicope (Rutaceae). The forests are rich in epiphytes (orchids, ferns, mosses, lichens), emergent tree ferns (Cyathea species), and, originally the palms Acanthophoenix rubra, but poaching has wiped out palms in many areas of Réunion. Three monodominant plant communities are also found in the cloud forests – forests of Acacia heterophylla (Fabaceae) as the canopy tree, which are similar to the Acacia koa forests in Hawaii, thickets dominated by Erica reunionensis (Ericaceae), and hyperhumid forests of screw-pine (Pandanus montanus).

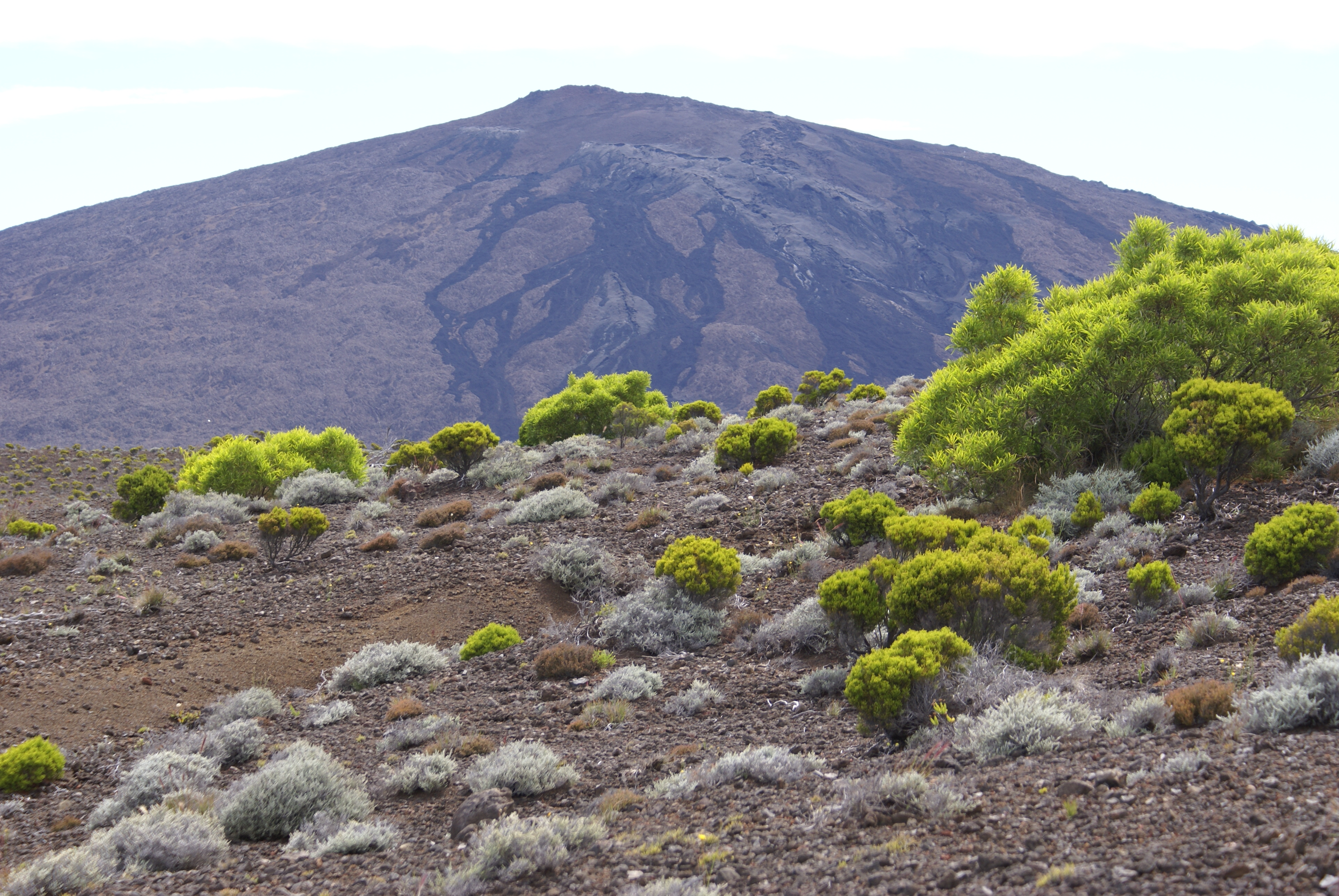
Open subalpine shrubland on Piton de la Fournaise, with Erica reunionensis, Stoebe passerinoides, Acacia heterophylla, and Erica galioides

Subalpine shrub occurs on the volcanoes on Réunion, above the treeline at 1800 to 2000 metres elevation. Average annual rainfall is from 2000 to 6000 mm, and frosts occur regularly in winter. Characteristic shrubs include Erica reunionensis and Erica galioides (Ericaceae), Stoebe passerinoides and species of Hubertia and Psiadia (Asteraceae), and Phylica nitida (Rhamnaceae). Herbaceous endemic species include Heterochaenia rivalsii (Campanulaceae), Eriotrix commersonii (Asteraceae), and Cynoglossum borbonicum (Boraginaceae). Recent volcanic deposits on Réunion's volcanic summits are covered by sparse grasslands rich in endemic grasses, including Festuca borbonica, Agrostis salaziensis, and Cenchrus afer. along with orchids like Disa borbonica. Ericoid thickets and thickets of the small tree Sophora denudata (Fabaceae) are found on weathered volcanic substrates.

Most of the indigenous Mascarene flora and fauna are thought to have descended originally from Madagascan and African ancestors. The four largest families present in the Mascarene Islands are Myrtaceae, Rubiaceae, Orchidaceae, and Euphorbiaceae, which comprise between 193 and 223 species each, for a total of 831 species, or 26.9% of the flowering plant flora. Another seven families contain 80 or more species each: Poaceae, Apocynaceae, Cyperaceae, Cunoniaceae, Rutaceae, Araliaceae, and Sapotaceae, representing an additional ca. 660 species in all, 21.3% of the angiosperm flora. Ferns are prominent components of the biotas of the islands, especially in the tropical forest. Most ferns disperse easily via ornithochory of their spores, allowing fairly frequent colonization from Madagascar and exchange among the Mascarene islands.

The Mascarenes are home to many endemic species of Dombeyoideae, the monotypic genus Psiloxylon (Psiloxylon mauritianum), and members of the family Monimiaceae (the genera Monimia and Trochetia, and species of Tambourissa) and Escalloniaceae. Indigenous trees include species of the genera Ocotea, Erythrina, Sideroxylon, and Foetidia. The palm genera Latania, Hyophorbe, Acanthophoenix, Dictyosperma, and Tectiphiala are all endemic to the Mascarene Islands. Other endemic genera include Berenice, Heterochaenia, Nesocodon, Ruizia, and Astiria.

There are 24 species of trees and shrubs in the Mascarenes from subfamily Dombeyoideae, 23 of which are endemic to the islands. The Macarenes' endemic species are polyphyletic and split into nine clades. Trochetia appears monophyletic and more closely related to Eriolaena and Helmiopsis than to Dombeya. All Dombeya taxa are included in a clade together with Ruizia and Astiria, this means that Dombeya is paraphyletic. In terms of breeding systems the Malagasy Dombeyoideae are hermaphroditic, whereas those of the Mascarenes are considered dioecious. The polyphyly of the Mascarene Dombeyoideae suggests that dioecy has been acquired several times. At least five colonization events from Madagascar to the Mascarene archipelago occurred. The evolutionary history of two lineages of Mascarene Domeyoideae seems to be related to adaption to xeric habitats.

The flora of the islands co-evolved with the island's unique fauna over millions of years. The human-caused extinction of several of the Mascarenes' land animals, and the introduction of exotic animals to the islands by humans, has disrupted the reproduction and thriving of various island plants. For example, the Tambalacoque tree (Sideroxylon grandiflorum), often called the dodo tree, is not producing young trees and is threatened with extinction. The extinct dodo, Cylindraspis tortoises, and broad-billed parrots, along with fruit bats, played an important role in dispersing the seeds. Passing through the animals' digestive tract aided in the seeds' germination. However the trees' decline may be mostly due to introduced crab-eating macaques (Macaca fascicularis) destroying unripened seeds.

== Fauna ==
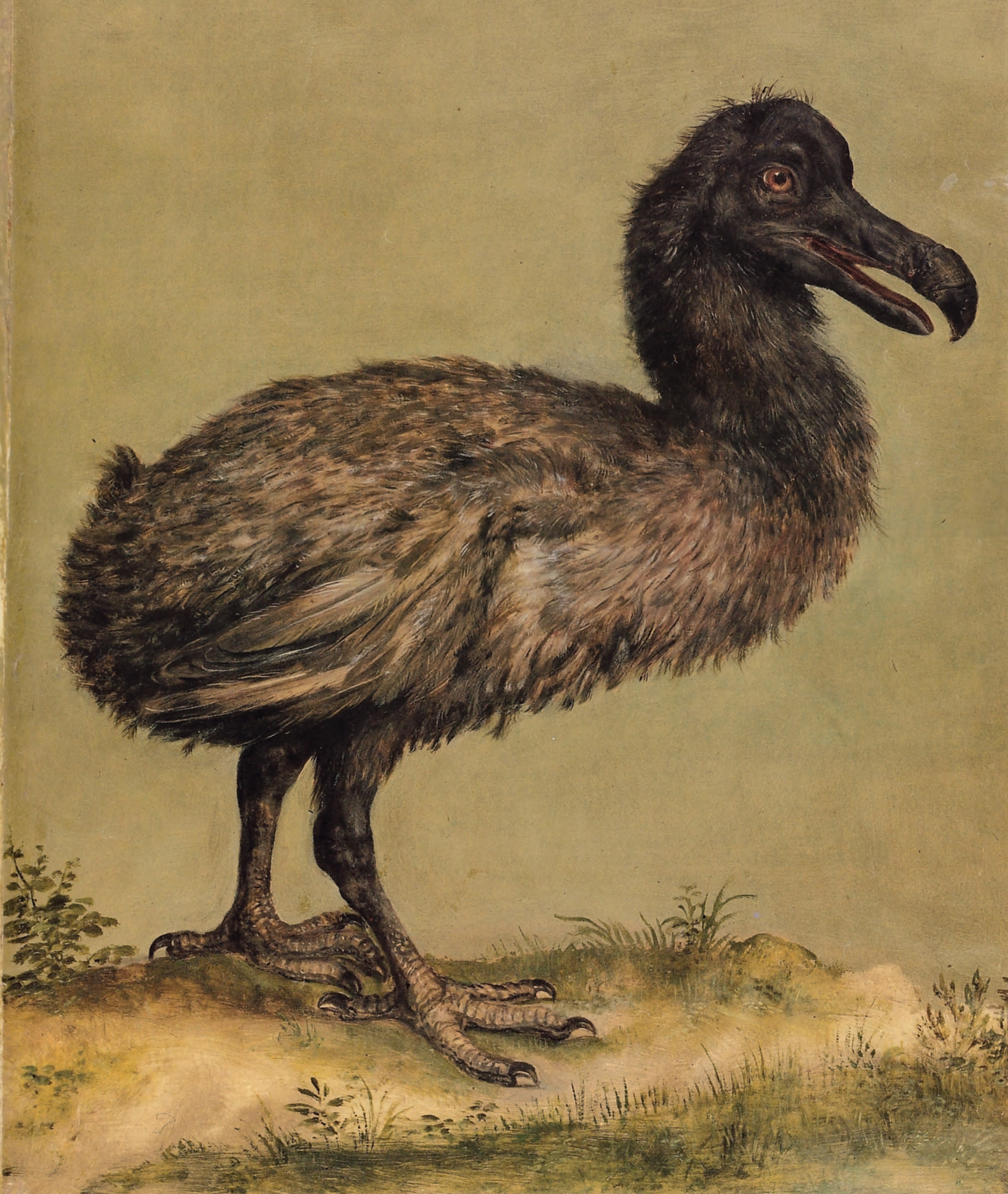
The dodo was a frugivore giant columbiforme of Mauritius Island where there are several Ocotea species. Painted by Jacob Hoefnagel, c. 1602

Much of the Mascarenes' native fauna has become endangered or extinct since the human settlement of the islands in the 17th century. Settlers cleared most of the forests for agriculture and grazing, and introduced many exotic species, including pigs, rats, cats, monkeys, and mongooses.

=== Birds ===
Many of the Mascarene birds evolved into flightless forms, the most famous of which was the extinct flightless pigeon, the dodo of Mauritius. Thirteen additional species of birds became extinct, including the Réunion flightless ibis, broad-billed parrot, red rail, Rodrigues rail, and Rodrigues solitaire. The constellation Turdus Solitarius was named after the Rodrigues solitaire.

Contemporary sources state that the dodo used gizzard stones and could swallow Ocotea fruits. Seed distribution of at least some Ocotea species is performed by frugivorous birds and there exist a few reports of "solitaires" from the Mascarenes without mention of which island these came from, and the term was also used for other species with "solitary" habits, such as the Réunion blue swamphen and the Réunion sacred ibis. At one point it was even believed that Réunion was the home of both a white dodo and a white solitaire. In 1786, sub-fossil bones were discovered in a cave which confirmed naturalist François Leguat's descriptions, but by that time no living residents of Rodrigues remembered having seen living birds.

Today 17 endemic bird species survive on the islands. Two species – the Mascarene paradise flycatcher (Terpsiphone bourbonnensis) and Mascarene swiftlet (Aerodramus francicus) – inhabit both Mauritius and Réunion. Eight species are endemic to Mauritius – the Mauritius grey white-eye, (Zosterops mauritianus), Mauritius cuckooshrike (Lalage typica), Mauritius kestrel (Falco punctatus), Mauritius fody (Foudia rubra), Mauritius bulbul (Hypsipetes olivaceus), Mauritius parakeet (Psittacula eques), Mauritius olive white-eye (Zosterops chloronothos), and pink pigeon (Nesoenas mayeri). The Réunion grey white-eye (Zosterops borbonicus), Réunion cuckooshrike (Lalage newtoni), Réunion stonechat (Saxicola tectes), Réunion olive white-eye (Zosterops olivaceus), and Réunion bulbul (Hypsipetes borbonicus) are endemic to Réunion. The Rodrigues warbler (Acrocephalus rodericanus) and Rodrigues fody (Foudia flavicans) are found only on Rodrigues.

=== Reptiles ===
Mauritius, Réunion, and Rodrigues were once each home to one or more species of giant tortoises, now extinct, which comprised the genus Cylindraspis. There are 13 living endemic reptile species, including several species of day geckoes (Phelsuma).

=== Mammals ===
The islands' only native mammals are bats, including the Mauritian flying fox (Pteropus niger), which is endemic to Mauritius and Réunion, and the Rodrigues flying fox (Pteropus rodricensis) found only on Rodrigues. The lesser Mascarene flying fox (Pteropus subniger) is extinct.

== Freshwater ==
The three largest islands have many freshwater streams which descend from the mountains to the sea. The upper reaches, particularly on Réunion, are fast-flowing and steep with numerous waterfalls. Tamarin Falls or Sept Cascades (293 m) on Mauritius is the highest waterfall on Mauritius, while Cascade Trou de Fer (725 m, ranks 23rd worldwide) on Réunion is the highest of the Mascarenes.

The Grand River South East (34 km) is the longest river on Mauritius, followed by Rivière du Poste (23 km), Grand River North West (22 km), Rivière La Chaux (22 km), and Rivière des Créoles (20 km). Mauritius has two natural crater lakes, Grand Bassin and Bassin Blanc.

There are about 20 species of fish which spend at least part of their lives in freshwater. The islands have five endemic freshwater fish species, all gobies (Gobiiformes) – Hypseleotris cyprinoides, Cotylopus acutipinnis, Glossogobius kokius, Gobius commersonii, and Oxyurichthys guibei. Cotylopus acutipinnis, which is endemic to Réunion, hatches in the sea before migrating to the rainforest streams where it lives its adult life.

== Marine ==
The islands are surrounded by approximately 750 square km of coral reef. Rodrigues has nearly continuous fringing reefs bounding an extensive lagoon, 7 to 20 km wide, with deep channels. Mauritius is also surrounded by a fringing reef. In contrast, Réunion has very short stretches of narrow fringing reef along the western and southwestern coasts only. The islets of the Cargados Carajos Shoals, which have a very depauperate terrestrial biota owing to being so low-lying and swamped during cyclones, are bound to the east by an extensive arc of fringing reef, which accounts for ~30% of the reefs of the Mascarene Islands. Lagoon reefs and reef flats are dominated by scleractinian corals such as branching and tabular Acropora, Porites massives, foliaceous Montipora and Pavona, and sand consolidated with beds of seagrass such Halophila (Hydrocharitaceae). Among coral reef fishes, wrasses (Labridae), damselfish (Pomacentridae), carnivorous groupers (Serranidae), and surgeonfishes (Acanthuridae) have many species.

== Conservation ==
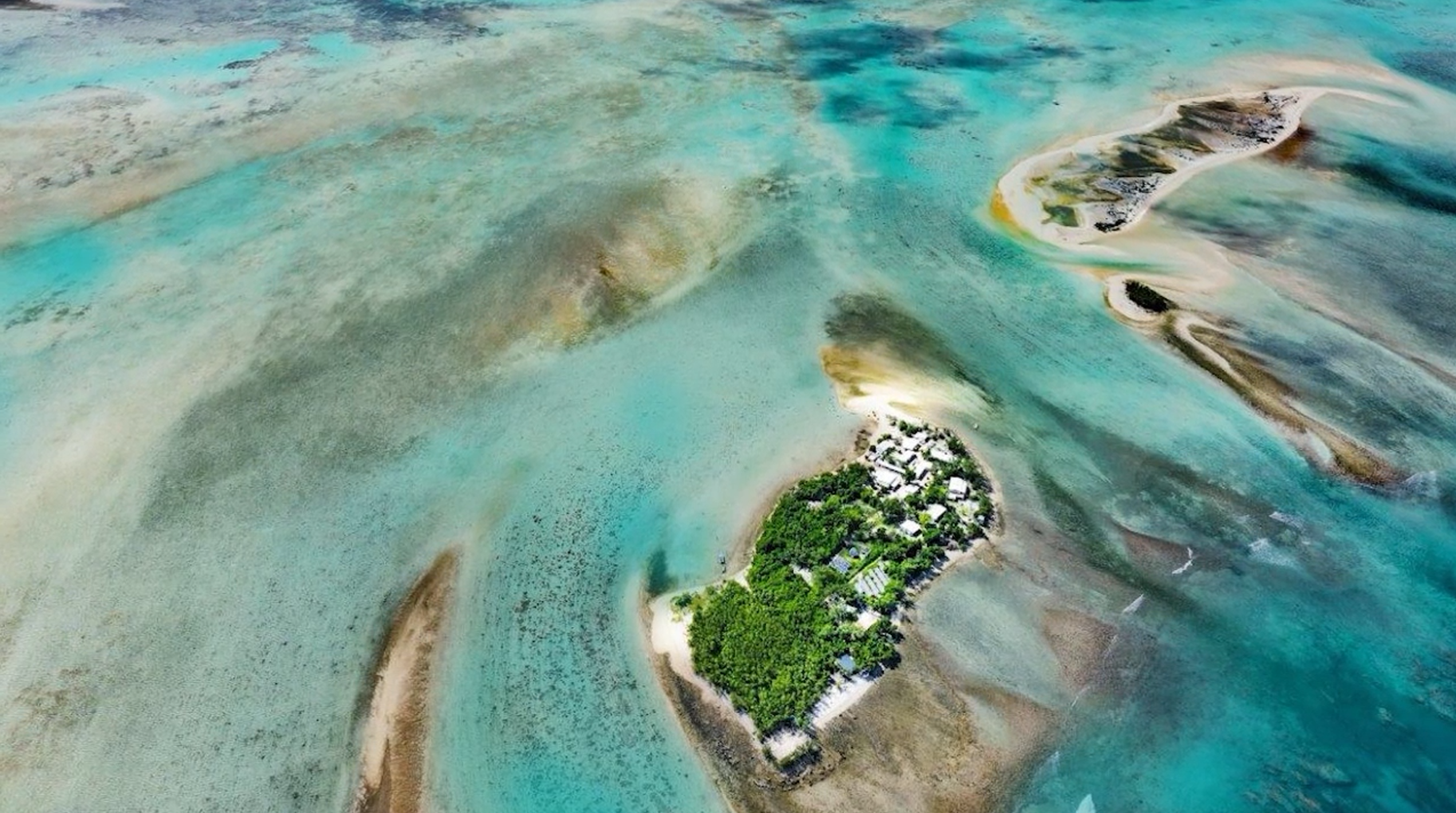
The Saint Brandon Conservation Trust at Corporate Council on Africa in May 2024 in Dallas, Texas

Mauritius has one of the highest population densities in the world. All of the islands have experienced significant losses of habitats. Many of the surviving endemic species are still threatened with extinction and have little protection. Less than 40 percent of Réunion is covered with natural vegetation, only about 5 percent of Mauritius, and almost none of Rodrigues. On Réunion, forest has been cleared for agriculture and then overtaken by introduced plants. Mauritius was largely converted to sugar cane, tea, and conifer plantations. On Rodrigues, shifting cultivation has caused the damage.

On 8 May 2024, Saint Brandon Conservation Trust, an independent Mauritian NGO, was internationally launched at the Corporate Council on Africa in Dallas, Texas, to protect St. Brandon from pollution and to protect surviving flora and fauna in the Cargados Carajos.

Protected areas constitute 40.6% of land area. Terrestrial protected areas on Mauritius include Black River Gorges National Park, Bras d'Eau National Park, Perrier Nature Reserve, Corps de Garde Nature Reserve, Le Pouce Nature Reserve, Cabinet Nature Reserve, Gouly Pere Nature Reserve, and Bois Sec Nature Reserve. There are 32 designated protected areas on Réunion, including Réunion National Park (1055.15 km^{2}), which cover 63.13% of the island.

== See also ==
- Constitution of Mauritius
- Mauritian Wildlife Foundation

== Sources ==
- Quammen, David, (1996) The Song of the Dodo. Touchstone, New York.
- Diamond, Jared, (1984) "Historic extinctions: A rosetta stone for understanding prehistoric extinctions". In: P. Martin and R. Klein (eds.) (1984) Quaternary Extinctions: A prehistoric revolution. University of Arizona Press, Tucson.
