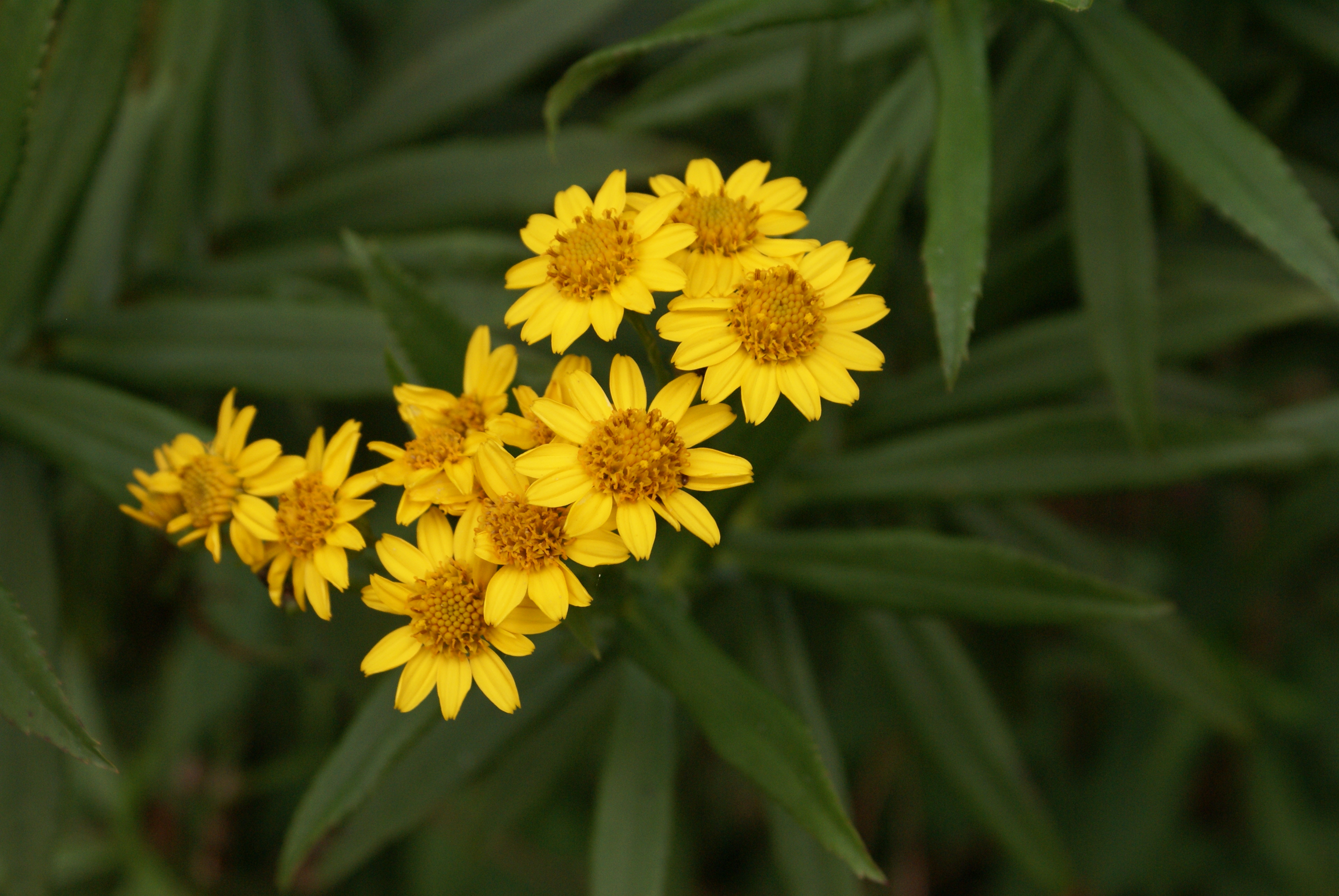
- Faujasia salicifolia

Scientific classification
- Kingdom: Plantae
- Clade: Tracheophytes
- Clade: Angiosperms
- Clade: Eudicots
- Clade: Asterids
- Order: Asterales
- Family: Asteraceae
- Subfamily: Asteroideae
- Tribe: Senecioneae
- Genus: Faujasia; Cass.

Type species
- Faujasia pinifolia Cass.

= Faujasia =

Genus of flowering plants

Faujasia is a genus of flowering plants in the daisy family, native to certain islands in the Indian Ocean.

Species

- Faujasia cadetiana C.Jeffrey - Réunion
- Faujasia flexuosa (Lam.) Benth. & Hook.f. ex Hook.f. & B.D.Jacks. - Mauritius
- Faujasia pinifolia (Bory) Cass. - Réunion
- Faujasia salicifolia (Pers.) C.Jeffrey - Réunion
- Faujasia squamosa (Bory) C.Jeffrey - Réunion

formerly included

now in other genera: Faujasiopsis Hubertia Parafaujasia

- Faujasia ambavilloides Cordem. - syn of Hubertia multifoliosa (Klatt) C.Jeffrey
- Faujasia flexuosa (Lam.) Baker - syn of Faujasiopsis flexuosa (Lam.) C.Jeffrey
- Faujasia fontinalis Cordem. - syn of Parafaujasia fontinalis (Cordem.) C.Jeffrey
- Faujasia reticulata (Vahl) Baker - syn of Faujasiopsis reticulata (Vahl) C.Jeffrey
