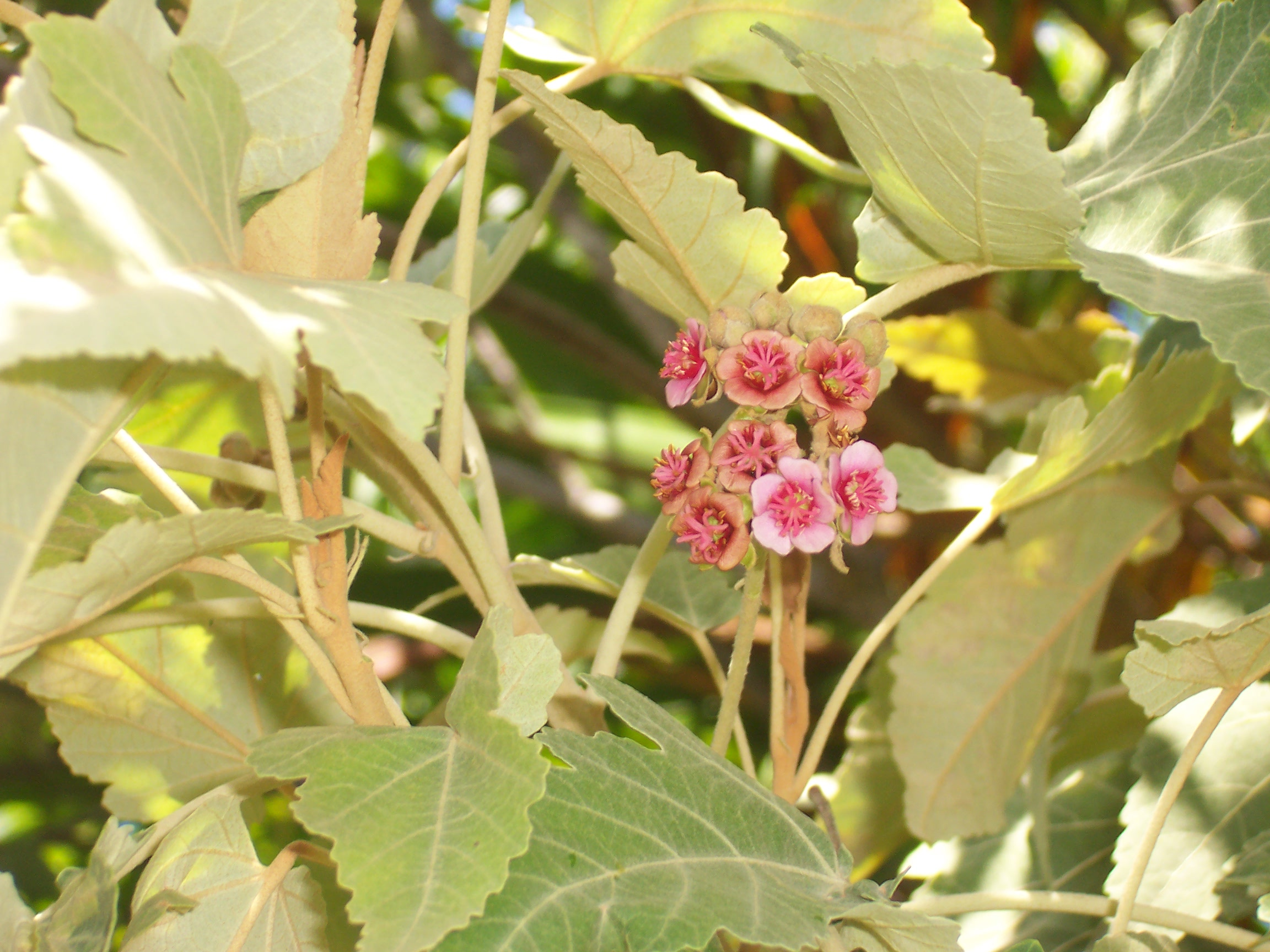
- Flowering branch of Ruizia cordata

Scientific classification
- Kingdom: Plantae
- Clade: Tracheophytes
- Clade: Angiosperms
- Clade: Eudicots
- Clade: Rosids
- Order: Malvales
- Family: Malvaceae
- Subfamily: Dombeyoideae; Beilschm.

Genera
- About 20, see text

Synonyms
- Corchoropsideae; Dombeyeae Kunth ex DC. Eriochlaeneae (orth. var.); Eriolaeneae; Eriolaenoideae (Arn.) Lindley; Excentrodendroideae; Helmiopsideae

= Dombeyoideae =

Subfamily of flowering plants

Dombeyoideae is a widely distributed subfamily of the Malvaceae, as proposed by the APG. Most of the plants placed here were once assembled with more or less related genera in the paraphyletic Sterculiaceae; a lesser number were placed in the Tiliaceae which were also not monophyletic.

The Dombeyoideae were originally described by Carl Beilschmied in 1833. In the present delimitation, they contain about 14 genera with about 380 species, some 60% of which are in Dombeya (one of the most speciose genera of Malvaceae). They grow in the Old World tropics, especially Madagascar and the Mascarenes where about two-thirds of the species occur. In the Mascarenes, they are among the most diverse angiosperm groups, analogous to such (unrelated) plants as the aeoniums on the Canary Islands or the silversword alliance of the Hawaiian Islands.

The subfamily is sometimes further divided into tribes (Corchoropsideae, Dombeyeae, Eriolaeneae, Helmiopsideae), but this is more often considered unwarranted. Probably, most or all of these supposed subdivisions are not monophyletic and thus technically synonyms of the whole subfamily.

Several species are noted for their timber, which is used for inlays and other artwork. Others – namely from the type genus Dombeya – are popular ornamental plants due to their beautiful flowers. Trochetia is famous for the coloured nectar it can produce, and it often is pollinated by Phelsuma geckos.

== Selected genera ==
Genera of Dombeyoideae include:

1. Burretiodendron – formerly in Tiliaceae
2. Cheirolaena Benth
3. Corchoropsis Siebold & Zucc. – formerly in Tiliaceae, synonym Paradombeya Stapf
4. Dombeya Cav.
5. Eriolaena DC. – synonyms Helmiopsiella Arenes and Helmiopsis H.Perrier
6. Harmsia K.Schum.
7. Melhania Forssk.
8. Nesogordonia Baill.
9. Paramelhania Arenes
10. Pentapetes L.
11. Pterospermum Schreb.
12. Ruizia Cav. – synonyms Trochetia DC. and Astiria Lindl.
13. Schoutenia Korth. – formerly in Tiliaceae: synonym Sicrea Hallier f.
14. Trochetiopsis Marais

== Bibliography ==
- Cao, Nathanaël; Le Pechon, Timothée & Zaragüeta-Bagils, René (2006): Does minimizing homoplasy really maximize homology? MaHo: A method for evaluating homology among most parsimonious trees. C. R. Palevol 7(1): 17–26. doi:10.1016/j.crpv.2007.12.008 (HTML abstract)
- Hinsley, Stewart R. (2007a): Synonymy of Malvaceae. Retrieved 2008-JUN-25.
- Hinsley, Stewart R. (2007b): Malvaceae Info: Index to Genera. Retrieved 2008-JUN-25.
