= F. salicifolia =

F. salicifolia may refer to:

- Faujasia salicifolia, a plant species in the genus Faujasia
- Ficus salicifolia, the willow-leaved fig tree, a tree species
- Fuchsia salicifolia, a flowering plant species in the genus Fuchsia

== See also ==
- Salicifolia (disambiguation)
