= Heterochaenia borbonica =

Scientific classification
- Kingdom: Plantae
- Clade: Tracheophytes
- Clade: Angiosperms
- Clade: Eudicots
- Clade: Asterids
- Order: Asterales
- Family: Campanulaceae
- Genus: Heterochaenia
- Species: H. borbonica

Binomial name
- Heterochaenia borbonica Badré ex. Cadet

Species of flowering plant

Heterochaenia borbonica is a species of flowering plant in the family Campanulaceae. It was described by Frederic Jean Badré and Thérésien Cadet in 1972. The species is entirely endemic to the island of Réunion, Mascarene Islands.
