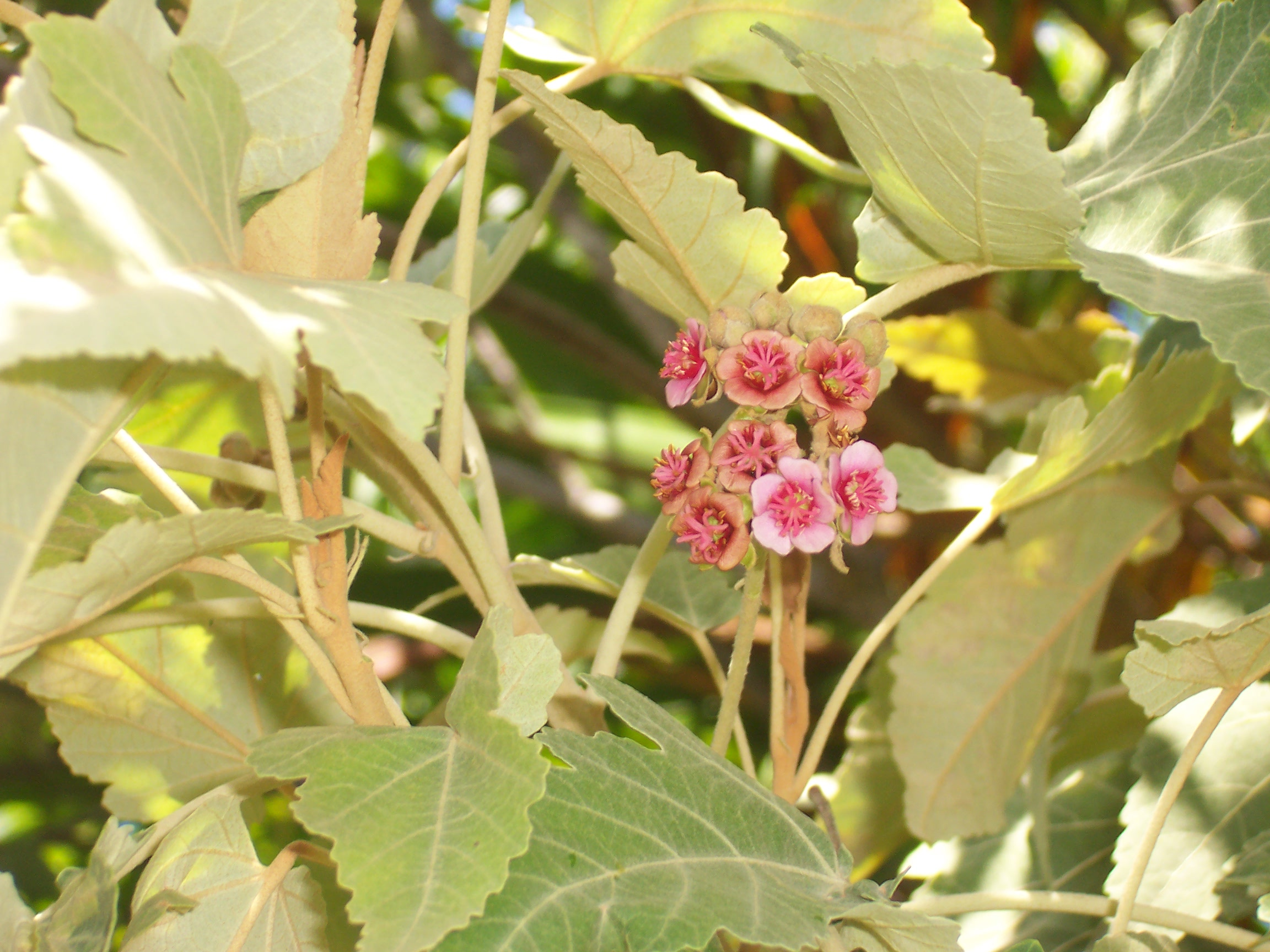
- Ruizia cordata

Scientific classification
- Kingdom: Plantae
- Clade: Embryophytes
- Clade: Tracheophytes
- Clade: Spermatophytes
- Clade: Angiosperms
- Clade: Eudicots
- Clade: Rosids
- Order: Malvales
- Family: Malvaceae
- Subfamily: Dombeyoideae
- Genus: Ruizia; Cav. (1786)

Synonyms
- Astiria Lindl. (1844); Trochetia DC. (1823)

= Ruizia =

Genus of plants

Ruizia is a genus of flowering plants belonging to the family Malvaceae. It contains 13 species native mostly to the Mascarene Islands (Mauritius and Réunion), and one species native to Madagascar.

The genus was described in 1786 by Antonio José Cavanilles, and named for Spanish botanist Hipólito Ruiz López (1754–1815). It was long thought to contain a single species, Ruizia cordata, endemic to Réunion. In 2021 the genus was re-circumscribed to include the genus Trochetia and several species formerly classed in genus Dombeya.

== Species ==
13 species are currently accepted:

- Subgenus Trochetia
  - Ruizia blackburniana (Bojer ex Baker) Dorr – Mauritius
  - Ruizia boutoniana (F.Friedmann) Dorr – Mauritius
  - Ruizia granulata (Cordem.) Dorr - Reunion
  - Ruizia parviflora (Bojer ex Baker) Dorr - Mauritius (Mount Corps de Garde)
  - Ruizia triflora (DC.) Dorr - Mauritius
  - Ruizia uniflora (DC.) Dorr - Mauritius
- Subgenus Ruizia
  - Ruizia cordata Cav. – Réunion
- Subgenus Dombeya
  - Ruizia ferruginea (Cav.) Dorr – Mascarene Islands
  - Ruizia mauritiana (F.Friedmann) Dorr – Mauritius
  - Ruizia parviflora (Bojer ex Baker) Dorr - Mauritius (Mount Corps de garde)
  - Ruizia populnea (Cav.) Dorr – Mascarene Islands
  - †? Ruizia rosea (Lindl.) Dorr – Mauritius
  - Ruizia sevathianii (Le Péchon & Baider) Dorr – Mauritius
  - Ruizia tremula (Hochr.) Dorr – southwestern Madagascar
