= Jackia =

Jackia may refer to any of three genera of plants, all named after William Jack (1795–1822):

- Jackia Wall., published in 1824, a synonym of Jackiopsis in family Rubiaceae
- Jackia Spreng., nom. illeg., named in 1826, a synonym of Eriolaena in family Malvaceae
- an orthographic variant used by the author of Jakkia Blume, published in 1823, in family Polygalaceae
