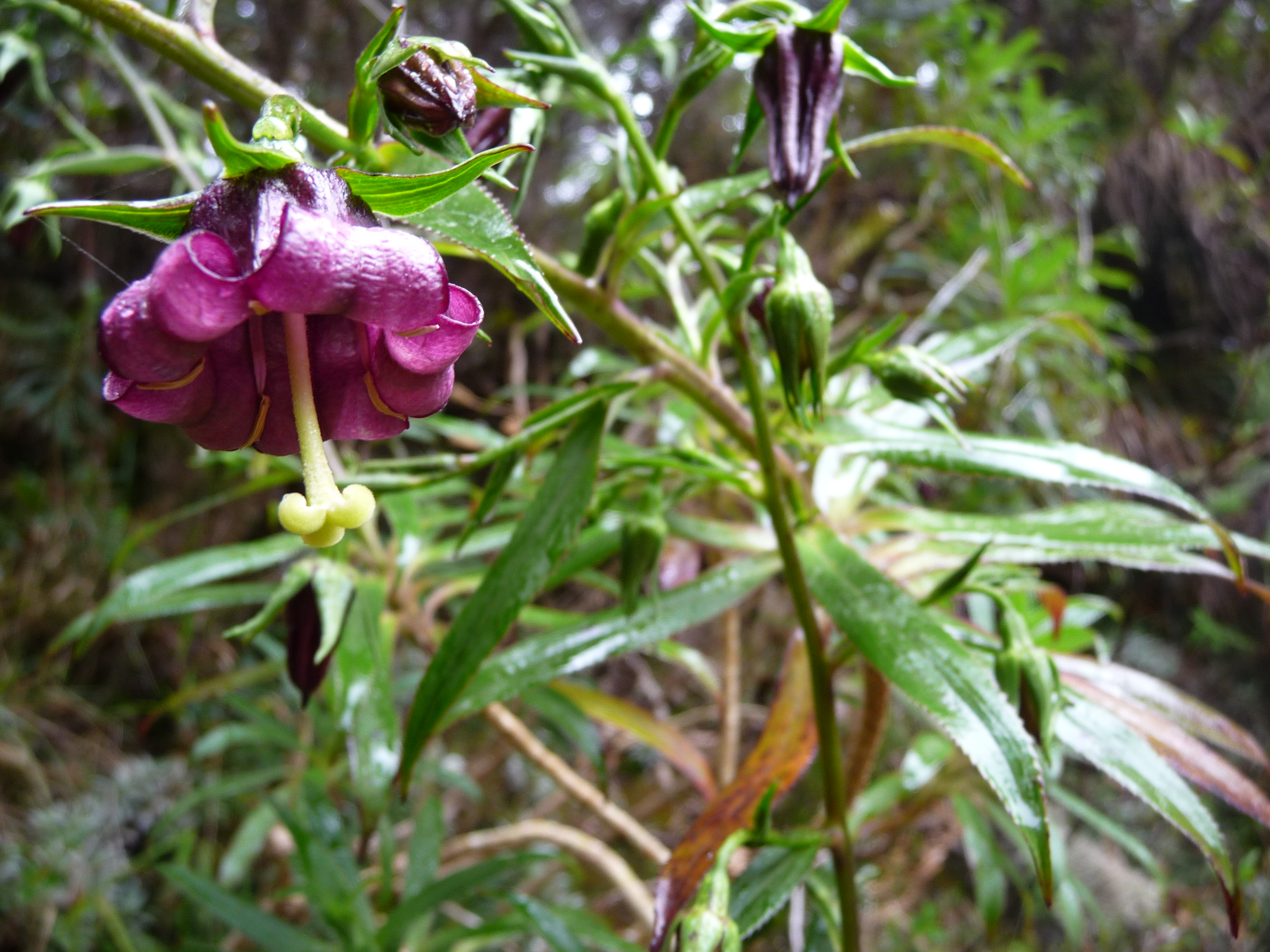
- Flowers of an individual

Scientific classification
- Kingdom: Plantae
- Clade: Tracheophytes
- Clade: Angiosperms
- Clade: Eudicots
- Clade: Asterids
- Order: Asterales
- Family: Campanulaceae
- Genus: Heterochaenia
- Species: H. ensifolia

Binomial name
- Heterochaenia ensifolia A.DC.

Synonyms
- Campanula ensifolia Lam.; Wahlenbergia ensifolia A.DC.

= Heterochaenia ensifolia =

Species of flowering plant

Heterochaenia ensifolia is a species of flowering plant in the family Campanulaceae. It was described by Alphonse Pyramus de Candolle in 1839. The species is entirely endemic to the island of Réunion, Mascarene Islands.
