= Heterochaenia fragrans =

Scientific classification
- Kingdom: Plantae
- Clade: Tracheophytes
- Clade: Angiosperms
- Clade: Eudicots
- Clade: Asterids
- Order: Asterales
- Family: Campanulaceae
- Genus: Heterochaenia
- Species: H. fragrans

Binomial name
- Heterochaenia fragrans H.Thomas ex. Félicité ex. Adolphe

Species of flowering plant

Heterochaenia fragrans is a species of flowering plant in the family Campanulaceae. It was described by Max Félicité, and two others listed as H. Thomas, and Adolphe in 2008. The species is entirely endemic to the island of Réunion, Mascarene Islands.
