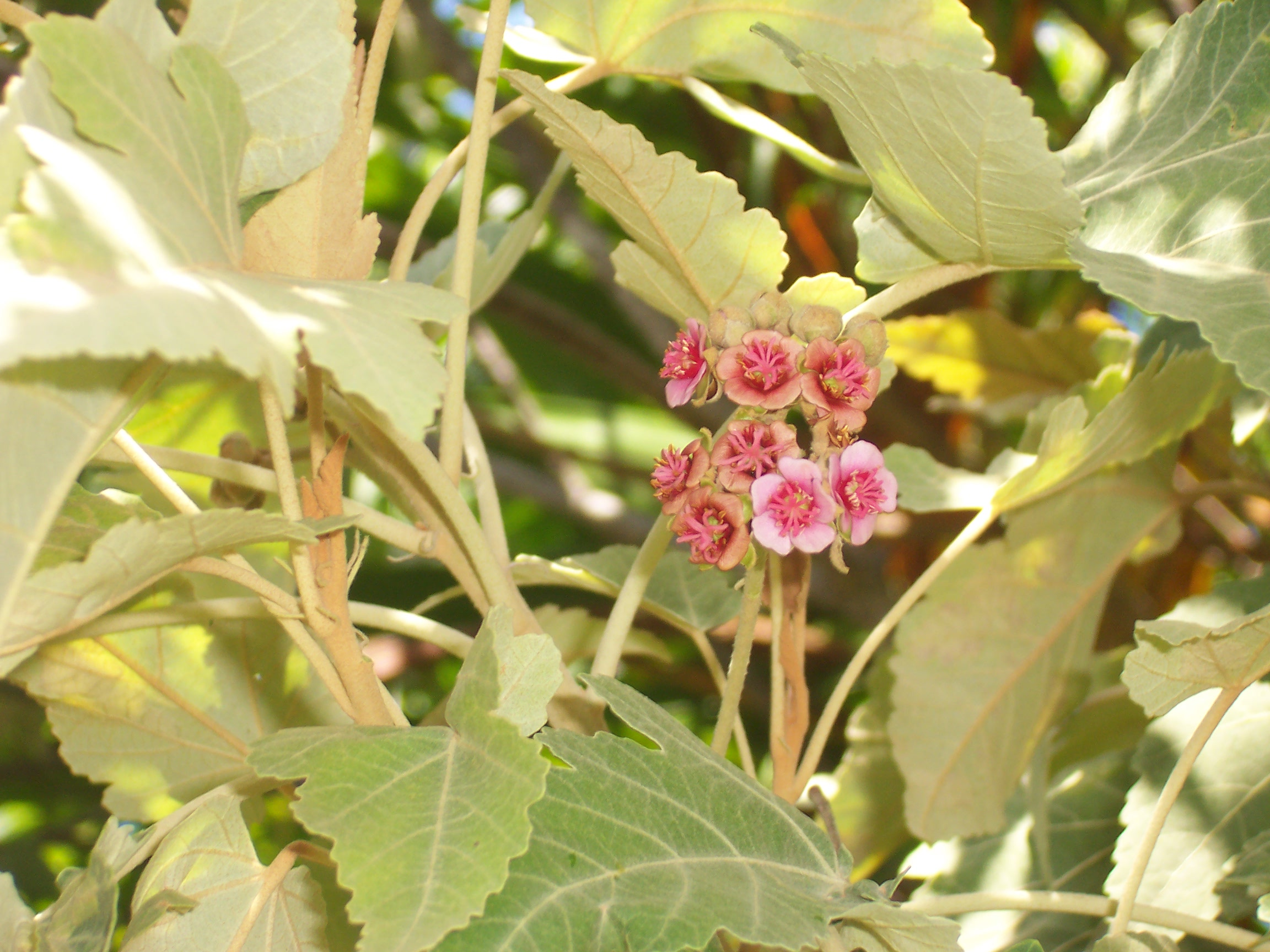
- Ruizia cordata

Scientific classification
- Kingdom: Plantae
- Clade: Tracheophytes
- Clade: Angiosperms
- Clade: Eudicots
- Clade: Rosids
- Order: Malvales
- Family: Malvaceae
- Subfamily: Dombeyoideae
- Genus: Ruizia
- Species: R. cordata

Binomial name
- Ruizia cordata Cav. (1787)

Synonyms
- Ruizia aurea Baker (1877); Ruizia diversifolia Jacq. (1798); Ruizia integrifolia Steud. (1841), nom. nud.; Ruizia laciniata Cav. (1787); Ruizia lobata Cav. (1787); Ruizia palmata Cav. (1787); Ruizia variabilis Jacq. (1798)

= Ruizia cordata =

Species of plant

Ruizia cordata is a species of flowering plant belonging to the family Malvaceae. It is a tree endemic to Réunion.
