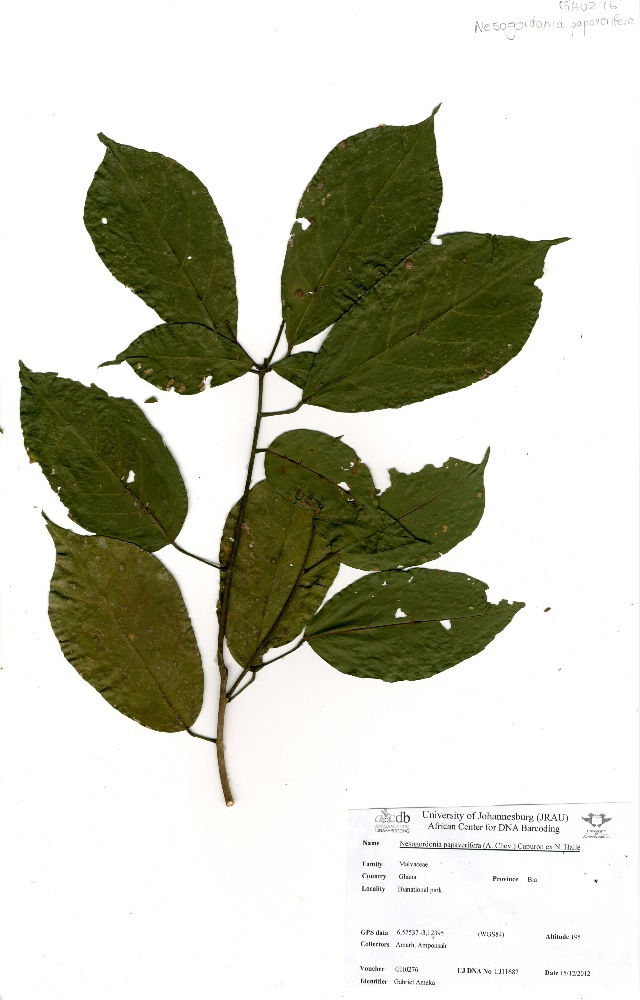

Conservation status
- Vulnerable (IUCN 2.3)

Scientific classification
- Kingdom: Plantae
- Clade: Tracheophytes
- Clade: Angiosperms
- Clade: Eudicots
- Clade: Rosids
- Order: Malvales
- Family: Malvaceae
- Genus: Nesogordonia
- Species: N. papaverifera

Binomial name
- Nesogordonia papaverifera (A.Chev.) Capuron

Synonyms
- Cistanthera papaverifera A.Chev.

= Nesogordonia papaverifera =

Species of flowering plant

Nesogordonia papaverifera is a species of flowering plant. Traditionally included in the family Sterculiaceae, it is included in the expanded Malvaceae in the APG and most subsequent systematics.

It is found in Benin, Cameroon, Central African Republic, Republic of the Congo, Ivory Coast, Gabon, Ghana, Liberia, Nigeria, and Sierra Leone. It is becoming rare due to by habitat loss.

== Uses ==
- The leaves are used to treat oral problems.
- The twigs are used as chew sticks to maintain the health of teeth and gums.
- A fibre is obtained from the bark.
- It is used for purposes such as general construction, floors, joinery, turnery, boatbuilding, tool handles, gunstocks, plywood, utility crossarms, furniture.
- it is used for fuel
