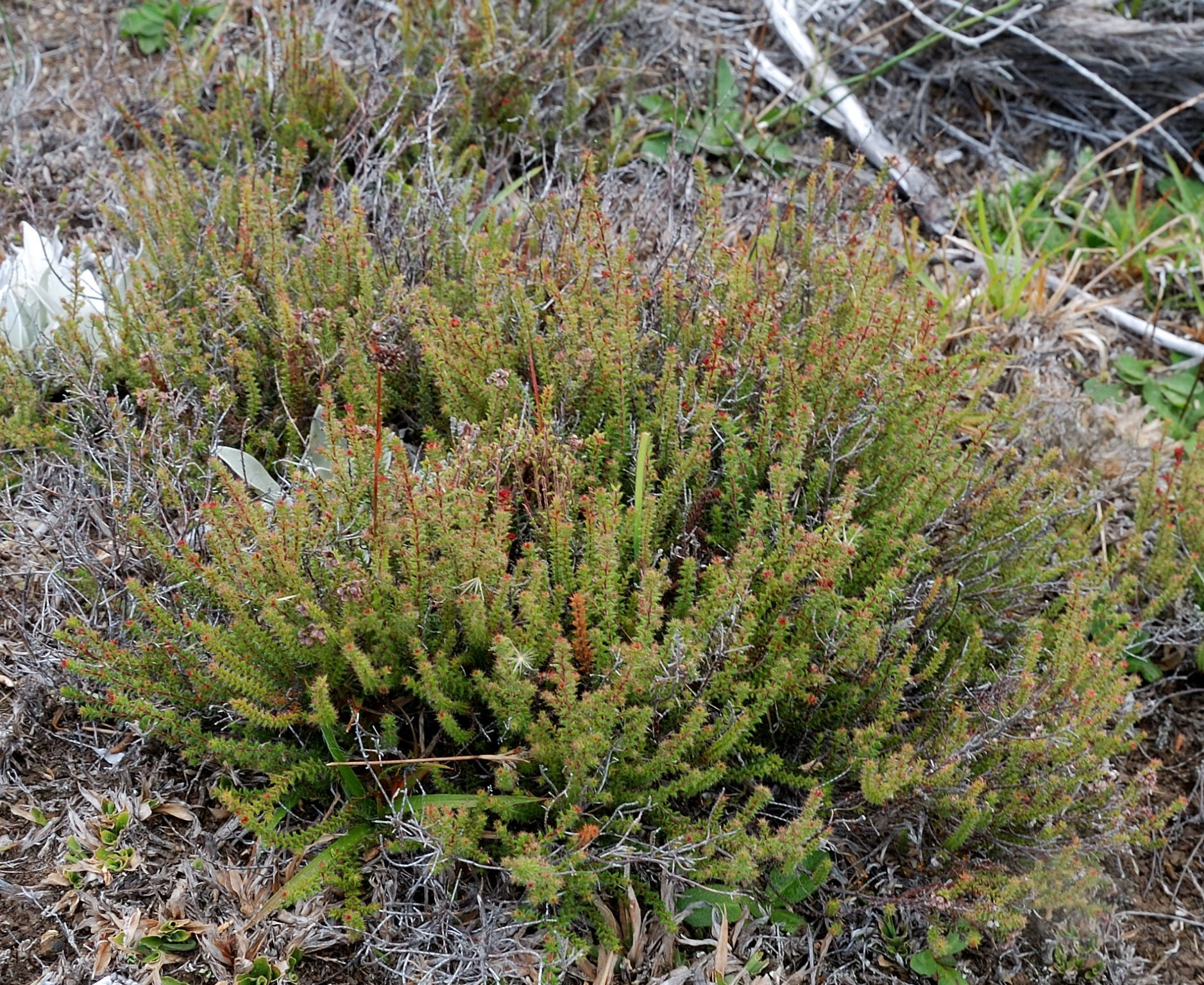

Scientific classification
- Kingdom: Plantae
- Clade: Tracheophytes
- Clade: Angiosperms
- Clade: Eudicots
- Clade: Asterids
- Order: Ericales
- Family: Ericaceae
- Genus: Erica
- Species: E. galioides

Binomial name
- Erica galioides Lam.

Synonyms
- Eleutherostemon galioides (Lam.) Klotzsch; Eleutherostemon multiglandulosus Klotzsch; Erica borbonica Willd. ex Klotzsch; Erica multiglandulosa Willd. ex Klotzsch; Erica ramosissima Kunth ex Klotzsch; Erica viscaria Bory ex Benth. Philippia galioides (Lam.) Benth. Philippia intricata Cordem. Philippia multiglandulosa (Klotzsch) Alm & T.C.E.Fr. Philippia ramosissima Benth. Philippia viscosa Benth. Salaxis galioides (Lam.) D.Dietr. Salaxis ramosissima (Benth.) D.Dietr. Salaxis viscosa (Benth.) D.Dietr.

= Erica galioides =

Species of flowering plant

Erica galioides is a species of flowering plant (angiosperms) in the heather family (Ericaceae). It is endemic to the island of Réunion in the Indian Ocean.

== Habitat ==
Erica galioides is the found above the treeline in the mountains of Réunion. It is present in subalpine dry ericaceous shrubland from 2200 to 2700 meters elevation, with Erica reunionensis, Agarista buxifolia, Stoebe passerinoides, Hypericum lanceolatum, Phylica nitida, Sophora denudata, Senecio hubertia, S. squamosus, Psiadia argentea, P. callocephala, P. anchusaefolia, Costularia melicoides, Festuca borbonica, and Agrostis salaziensis, and in alpine open dwarf scrub and semi-desert from 2700 to 3000 meters elevation with Stoebe passerinoides, Festuca borbonica, Poa borbonica, Agrostis salaziensis, Pennisetum caffrum, and Grimmia spp.
