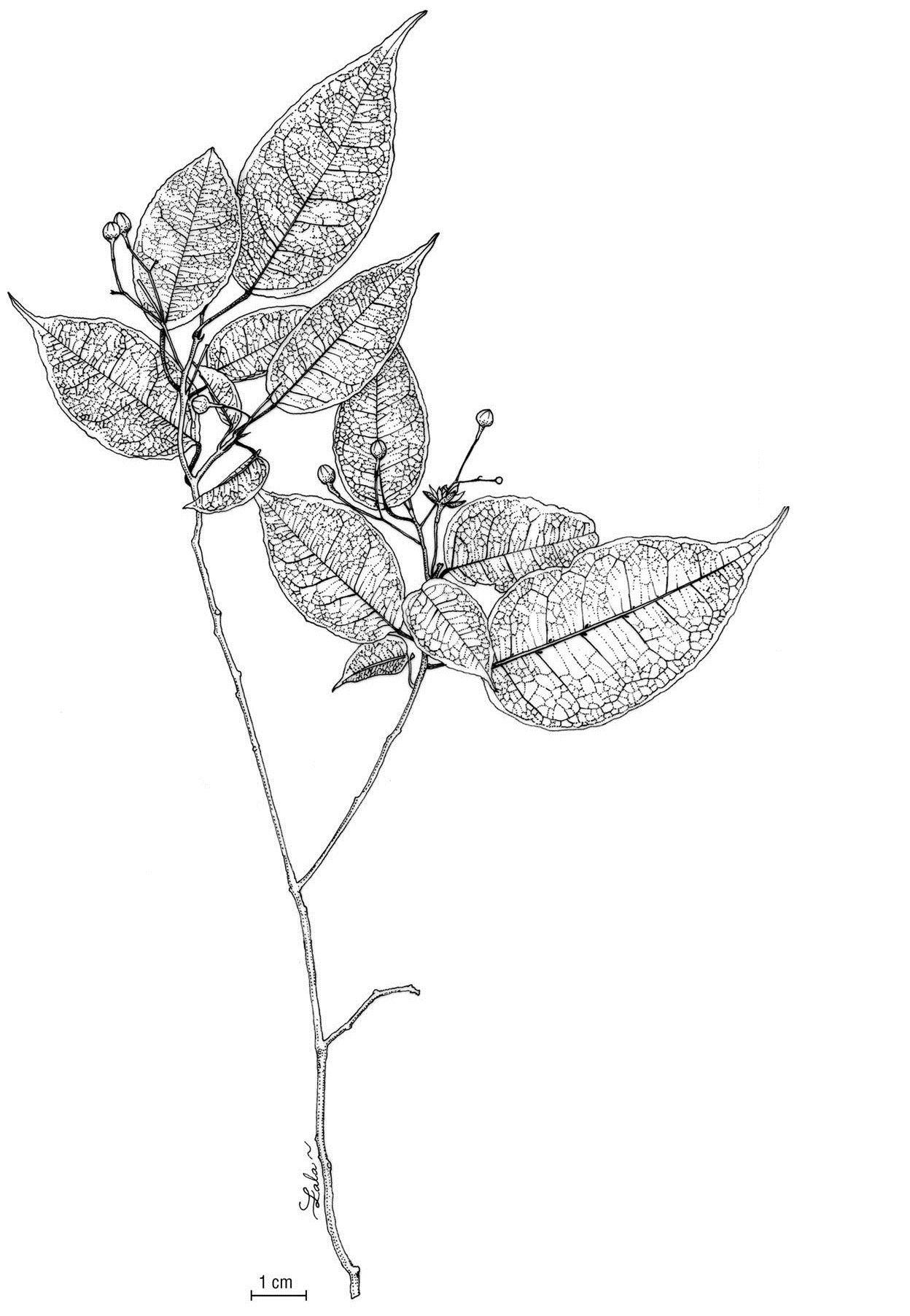
- Nesogordonia tricarpellata

Scientific classification
- Kingdom: Plantae
- Clade: Tracheophytes
- Clade: Angiosperms
- Clade: Eudicots
- Clade: Rosids
- Order: Malvales
- Family: Malvaceae
- Subfamily: Dombeyoideae
- Genus: Nesogordonia; Baill.

Species
- Several, see text

Synonyms
- Cistanthera K.Schum.

= Nesogordonia =

Genus of flowering plants

Nesogordonia is a genus of flowering plants. It ranges across tropical Africa, Madagascar, and the Comoro Islands. The majority of species are endemic to Madagascar.

Traditionally included in the family Sterculiaceae, it is included in the expanded Malvaceae in the APG and most subsequent systematics. In that clade, it belongs to the subfamily Dombeyoideae. Nesogordonia is among the oldest living genera of its subfamily, if not the most ancestral one.

There are 22 accepted species:

- Nesogordonia abrahamii L.C.Barnett Madagascar
- Nesogordonia ambalabeensis Arènes Madagascar
- Nesogordonia bernieri Baill. Madagascar
- Nesogordonia chrysocarpa Rakotoar. & Callm. Madagascar
- Nesogordonia crassipes (Baill.) Capuron ex Arènes Madagascar
- Nesogordonia fertilis H.Perrier Madagascar
- Nesogordonia holtzii (Engl.) Capuron ex L.C.Barnett & Dorr southeastern Kenya, Tanzania, Mozambique
- Nesogordonia humbertii Capuron Madagascar
- Nesogordonia kabingaensis (K.Schum.) Capuron ex R.Germ. Sierra Leone, Benin and Nigeria, Gabon to Uganda.
- Nesogordonia macrophylla Arénes Madagascar
- Nesogordonia micrantha Arènes Madagascar
- Nesogordonia monantha Arènes Madagascar
- Nesogordonia normandii Capuron Madagascar
- Nesogordonia pachyneura Capuron ex L.C.Barnett Madagascar
- Nesogordonia papaverifera (A.Chev.) Capuron ex N.Hallé Sierra Leone to Central African Republic and Republic of the Congo
- Nesogordonia perpulchra N.Hallé Gabon
- Nesogordonia perrieri Arènes Madagascar
- Nesogordonia rakotovaoi Rakotoar., Andriamb. & Callm. Madagascar
- Nesogordonia stylosa H.Perrier Madagascar
- Nesogordonia suzannae Labat, Munzinger & O.Pascal Mayotte
- Nesogordonia thouarsii (Baill.) Capuron ex Arènes Madagascar
- Nesogordonia tricarpellata Skema & Dorr Madagascar
