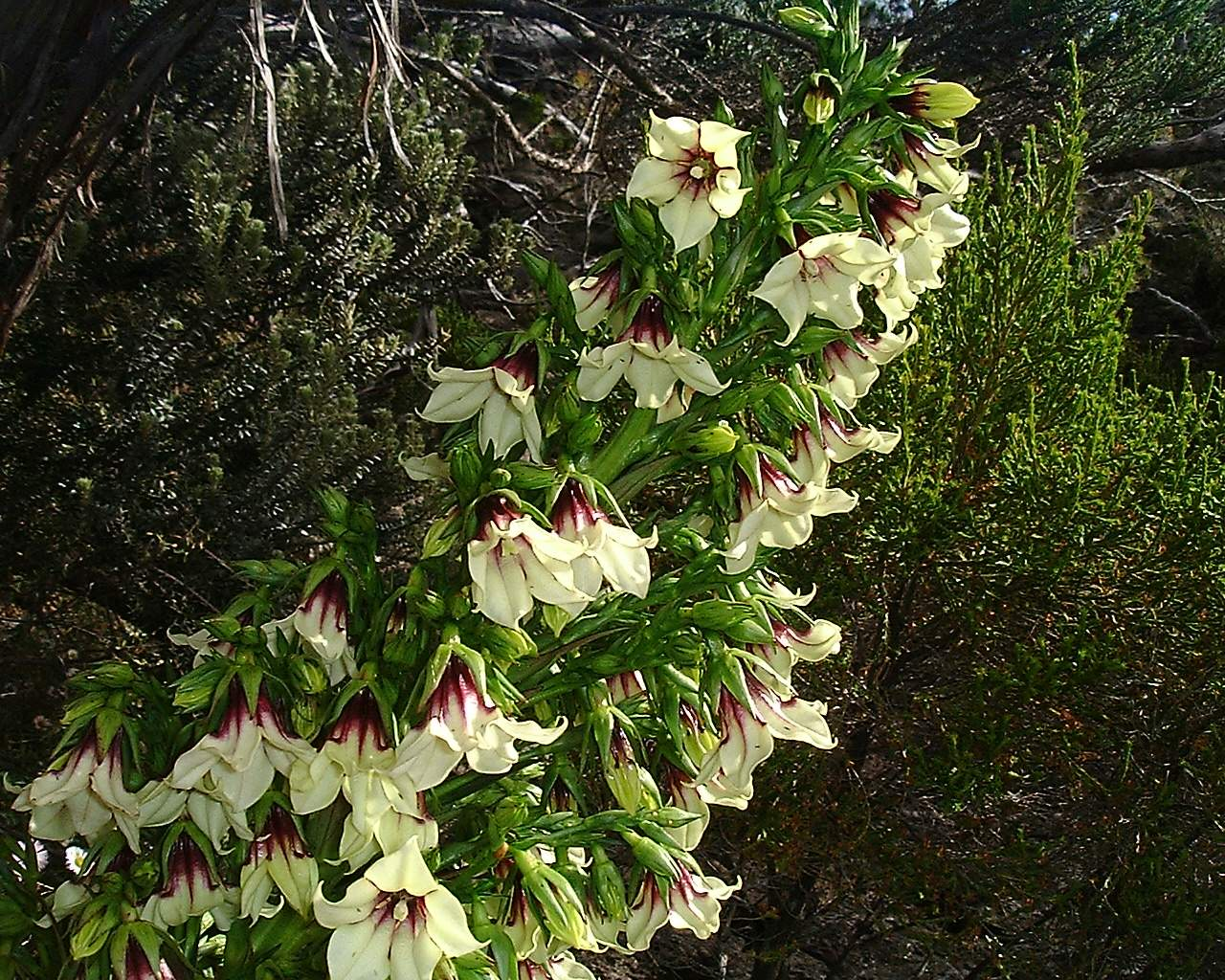
- Flower stalk

Scientific classification
- Kingdom: Plantae
- Clade: Tracheophytes
- Clade: Angiosperms
- Clade: Eudicots
- Clade: Asterids
- Order: Asterales
- Family: Campanulaceae
- Genus: Heterochaenia
- Species: H. rivalsii

Binomial name
- Heterochaenia rivalsii Badré ex. Cadet

= Heterochaenia rivalsii =

Species of flowering plant

Heterochaenia rivalsii is a species of flowering plant in the family Campanulaceae. It was described by Frederic Jean Badré and Thérésien Cadet in 1972. The species is entirely endemic to the island of Réunion, Mascarene Islands.
