= Eriolaena lushingtonii =

Conservation status
- Vulnerable (IUCN 2.3)

Scientific classification
- Kingdom: Plantae
- Clade: Tracheophytes
- Clade: Angiosperms
- Clade: Eudicots
- Clade: Rosids
- Order: Malvales
- Family: Malvaceae
- Genus: Eriolaena
- Species: E. lushingtonii

Binomial name
- Eriolaena lushingtonii Dunn

Species of flowering plant

Eriolaena lushingtonii is a species of flowering plant in the family Malvaceae. It is found only in Andhra Pradesh and Tamil Nadu in India. It is threatened by habitat loss.

Eriolaena lushingtonii is used as an antidote for snake and scorpion bites.
