= Ruizia rosea =

Scientific classification
- Kingdom: Plantae
- Clade: Tracheophytes
- Clade: Angiosperms
- Clade: Eudicots
- Clade: Rosids
- Order: Malvales
- Family: Malvaceae
- Genus: Ruizia
- Species: R. rosea

Binomial name
- Ruizia rosea (Lindl.) Dorr (2020)

Synonyms
- Astiria rosea Lindl. (1844); Dombeya astrapaeoides Bojer (1837), not validly publ.; Dombeya astylosa Arènes (1960); Dombeya boutonii Arènes (1960)

Genus of flowering plants

Ruizia rosea is a species of flowering plant belonging to the family Malvaceae. It is a tree that was endemic to Mauritius. It is thought to be extinct.
