= Henri Dutrochet =

French physician, botanist and physiologist

Rene Henri Dutrochet
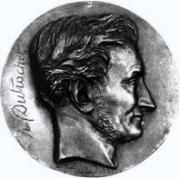
- Rene Henri Dutrochet
- Born: 14 November 1776; Poitou
- Died: 4 February 1847 (aged 70); Paris
- Scientific career
- Fields: Physician; Botanist; Physiologist
- Author abbrev. (botany): Dutr.

René Joachim Henri Dutrochet (14 November 1776 – 4 February 1847) was a French medical doctor, botanist and physiologist. He is best known for his investigation into osmosis.

== Early career ==
Dutrochet was born on Néons to a noble family, soon ruined in the French Revolution. In 1799 he entered the military marine at Rochefort, but soon left it to join the Vendean army. He then left it to tend to his family's manor in Touraine. There, he was a keen addition to the scientific nation.

In 1802 he began to study medicine at Paris, and was subsequently appointed chief physician to the hospital at Burgos, in Spain. After an attack of typhus he returned in 1809 to France, where he devoted himself to the study of the natural sciences.

== Contributions ==
His scientific publications were numerous, and covered a wide field, but his most noteworthy work was embryological. His Recherches sur l'accroissement et la reproduction des végétaux, published in the Mémoires du museum d'histoire naturelle for 1821, procured him in that year the French Academy's prize for experimental physiology. In 1837 appeared his Mémoires pour servir a l'histoire anatomique et physiologique des végétaux et des animaux, a collection of all his more important biological papers.

He investigated and described osmosis, respiration, embryology, and the effect of light on plants. He has been given credit for discovering cell biology and cells in plants and the actual discovery of the process of osmosis. His early researches into the voice introduced the first modern concept of vocal cord movement.

The Mauritian plant genus Trochetia was named in his honour.

== Works ==
- New Theory of the Voice (1800)
- New Theory of Harmony (1810)
- Researches in the growth and reproduction of plants (1821)
- Research in Osteogenesis (bone production) (1822)
- Research in the anatomy of animals and plants (1824)
- Research in an agent's immediate vital movement (1826)
- Research in Endosmosis and Exosmosis (1828)
- Research in the development of the egg and the fetus
- Research in Radial development in plants and the ascent of Sap.
- Contributions to understanding anatomy and physiology of plants and animals (1837)
- Research in the elliptical force (1842–43)
- Contributions to the modern cell theory

== See also ==
- Cell theory
