= Faujasiopsis =

Scientific classification
- Kingdom: Plantae
- Clade: Tracheophytes
- Clade: Angiosperms
- Clade: Eudicots
- Clade: Asterids
- Order: Asterales
- Family: Asteraceae
- Subfamily: Asteroideae
- Tribe: Senecioneae
- Genus: Faujasiopsis; C.Jeffrey

Genus of flowering plants

Faujasiopsis is a genus of flowering plants in the sunflower family, endemic to the Island of Mauritius in the Indian Ocean.

Species

- Faujasiopsis boivinii - Mauritius
- Faujasiopsis flexuosa - Mauritius
- Faujasiopsis reticulata - Mauritius
