= Cheirolaena =

Scientific classification
- Kingdom: Plantae
- Clade: Tracheophytes
- Clade: Angiosperms
- Clade: Eudicots
- Clade: Rosids
- Order: Malvales
- Family: Malvaceae
- Genus: Cheirolaena; Benth. (1862)
- Species: C. linearis

Binomial name
- Cheirolaena linearis Benth. (1862)

Genus of flowering plants

Cheirolaena linearis is a species of flowering plant belonging to the family Malvaceae. It is the sole species in genus Cheirolaena. It is a shrub native to Madagascar and Mayotte.
