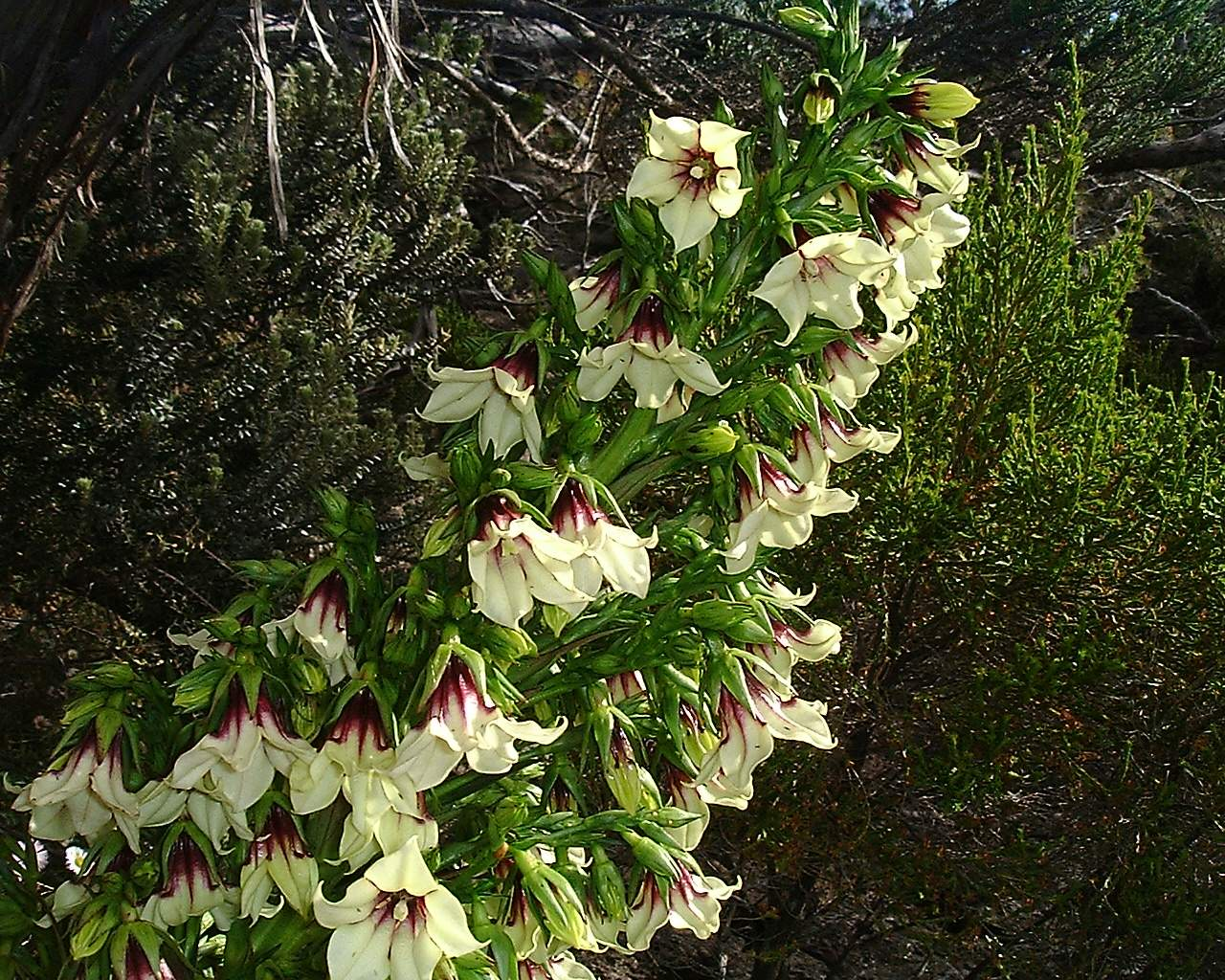
- Heterochaenia rivalsii

Scientific classification
- Kingdom: Plantae
- Clade: Tracheophytes
- Clade: Angiosperms
- Clade: Eudicots
- Clade: Asterids
- Order: Asterales
- Family: Campanulaceae
- Subfamily: Campanuloideae
- Genus: Heterochaenia; A.DC.

Species
- See text

= Heterochaenia =

Genus of flowering plants

Heterochaenia is a genus of flowering plants within the family Campanulaceae which are native to Réunion.

Species include:

- Heterochaenia borbonica Badre & Cadet
- Heterochaenia ensifolia A.DC.
- Heterochaenia rivalsii Badre & Cadet
- Heterochaenia fragrans H.Thomas, Félicité & Adolphe
