= Ruizia parviflora =

Scientific classification
- Kingdom: Plantae
- Clade: Embryophytes
- Clade: Tracheophytes
- Clade: Angiosperms
- Clade: Eudicots
- Clade: Rosids
- Order: Malvales
- Family: Malvaceae
- Genus: Ruizia
- Species: R. parviflora

Binomial name
- Ruizia parviflora (Bojer ex Baker) Dorr (2020)

Synonyms
- Dombeya parviflora (Bojer ex Baker) Arènes (1960), nom. illeg.; Trochetia parviflora Bojer ex Baker (1877)

Species of plant

Ruizia parviflora is a very rare shrub from the family Malvaceae. It is endemic to Mauritius.

The species was first described as Trochetia parviflora in 1877. It was renamed in 2020 when genus Trochetia was subsumed into genus Ruizia.

== Description ==
Ruizia parviflora is a much-branched low shrub which can reach a height up to 4 metres (13 ft). The bark has a lepidote brown pubescence which is much thinner than in Ruizia uniflora and Ruizia triflora. On the branches fruits are placed in a group of three. The oblong and entire leaves have a length between 2.5 and 3.8 centimetres (1.0 and 1.5 in). The leaf base is rather rounded. The upperside of the leaf is obtused and scabrous, the underside is thinly scurfy.

== Status ==
In the past Ruizia parviflora was known from the forest at Montagne-Ory. After botanist Philip Burnard Ayres collected the last known specimens in 1863 it was long regarded as lost until 76 individuals were rediscovered in April 2001 by the Mauritian botanists Vincent Florens and Jean-Claude Sevathian, from the Mauritius Herbarium, on a rocky slope of the Corps de Garde six kilometres apart from the type locality. It was assumed that this species has reduced its original range due to competition with invasive alien plants and seed predation by invasive monkeys and rats. Today the biggest threats are wildfire and landslides.
