= Faujasiopsis reticulata =

Conservation status
- Critically Endangered (IUCN 2.3)

Scientific classification
- Kingdom: Plantae
- Clade: Tracheophytes
- Clade: Angiosperms
- Clade: Eudicots
- Clade: Asterids
- Order: Asterales
- Family: Asteraceae
- Genus: Faujasiopsis
- Species: F. reticulata

Binomial name
- Faujasiopsis reticulata (Vahl) C. Jeffrey

Species of flowering plant

Faujasiopsis reticulata, the oreille de souris, is a species of flowering plant in the family Asteraceae. It is found only in Mauritius. Its natural habitat is subtropical or tropical dry forests.
