= Carl Traugott Beilschmied =

Carl Traugott Beilschmied (19 October 1793 in Langenöls – 6 May 1848 in Herrnstadt) was a German pharmacist and botanist, known for his research in phytogeography.

Prior to 1820, he trained and worked in pharmacies in Beuthen, Breslau and Berlin. He then studied at the University of Bonn, where he came under the influence of Christian Gottfried Daniel Nees von Esenbeck. In 1822 he began work as a provisor at a pharmacy in Ohlau, becoming its manager in 1826. In 1837 he received an honorary doctorate from the University of Breslau, and during the following year, became a member of the Deutsche Akademie der Naturforscher Leopoldina.

As a taxonomist he described several botanical subfamilies. The genus Beilschmiedia was named in his honour by Nees von Esenbeck.

== Published works ==
In 1834 he published a German translation of John Lindley's Nixus plantarum, titled: Nixus plantarum. Die Stämme des Gewächsreiches. Other noted works associated with Beilschmied are:

- Ueber einige bei pflanzengeographischen Vergleichungen zu berücksichtigende Punkte, in Anwendung auf die Flora Schlesiens, 1829 – On some phytogeographical comparison points in regards to Silesian flora.
- Pflanzengeographie, nach Alexander von Humboldt's werke ueber die geographische Vertheilhung der Gewächse, 1831 – Plant geography, according to Alexander von Humboldt's works about the geographical Vertheilhung of plants.
- Die geographischen und historischen verhältnisse der eichen- und der birken-familie in Italy (with Joakim Frederik Schouw), 1850 – The geographical and historical conditions of the oak and birch families in Italy.
