= Disa borbonica =

Scientific classification
- Kingdom: Plantae
- Clade: Embryophytes
- Clade: Tracheophytes
- Clade: Angiosperms
- Clade: Monocots
- Order: Asparagales
- Family: Orchidaceae
- Subfamily: Orchidoideae
- Genus: Disa
- Species: D. borbonica

Binomial name
- Disa borbonica Balf.f. & S.Moore (1876)

Species of flowering plant in the orchid family

Disa borbonica is a species of orchid in the Orchidaceae family. It is endemic to Réunion.
