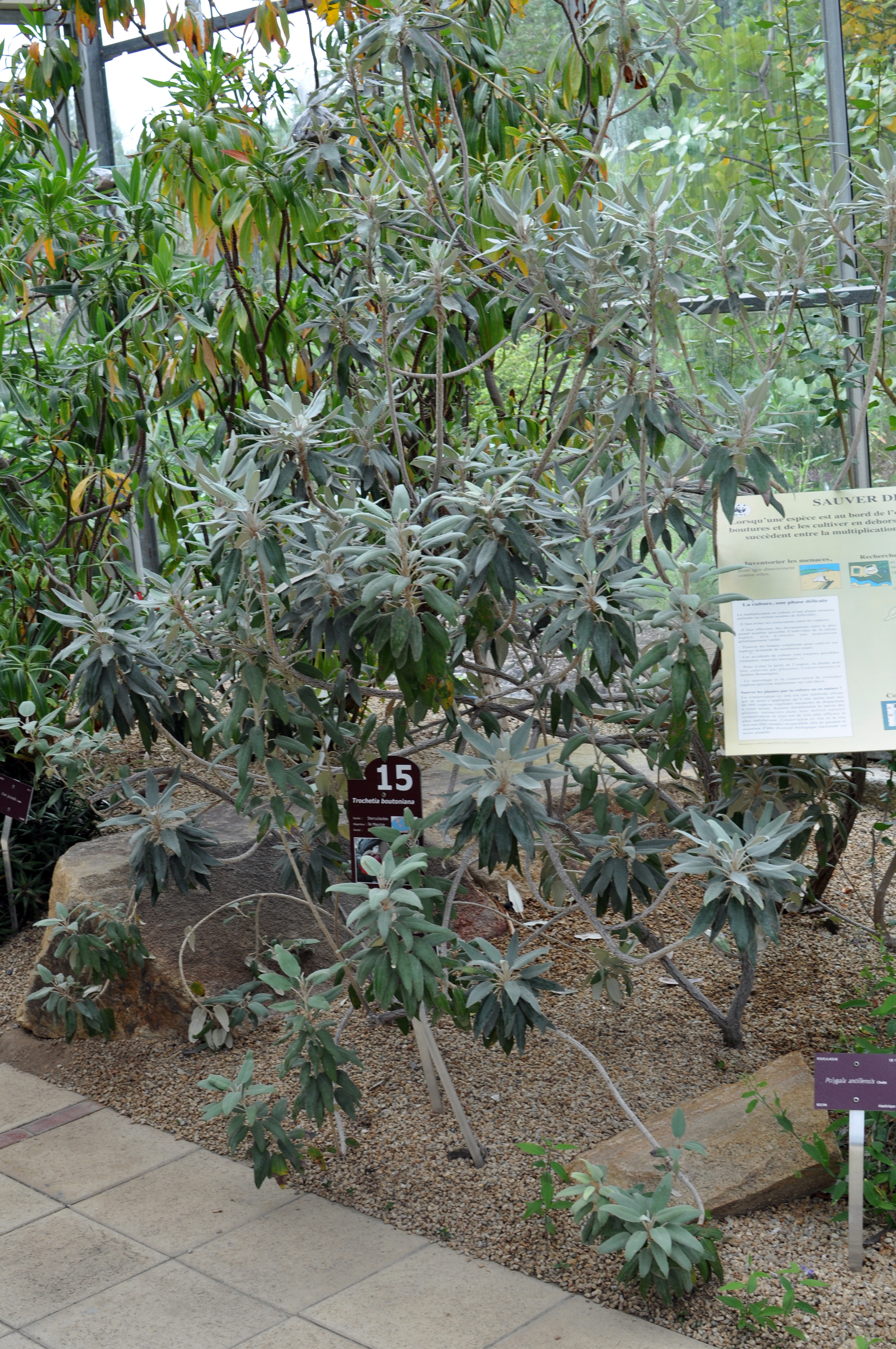

Scientific classification
- Kingdom: Plantae
- Clade: Tracheophytes
- Clade: Angiosperms
- Clade: Eudicots
- Clade: Rosids
- Order: Malvales
- Family: Malvaceae
- Genus: Ruizia
- Species: R. boutoniana

Binomial name
- Ruizia boutoniana (F. Friedmann) Dorr (2020)

Synonyms
- Trochetia boutoniana F.Friedmann (1981)

= Ruizia boutoniana =

Species of shrub

Ruizia boutoniana, known by its native Creole name boucle d'oreille, is a shrub in the family Malvaceae. It is endemic to Mauritius.

The species was first described as Trochetia boutoniana by Francis Friedmann in 1981. It was renamed in 2020 when genus Trochetia was subsumed into Ruizia.

== Description ==
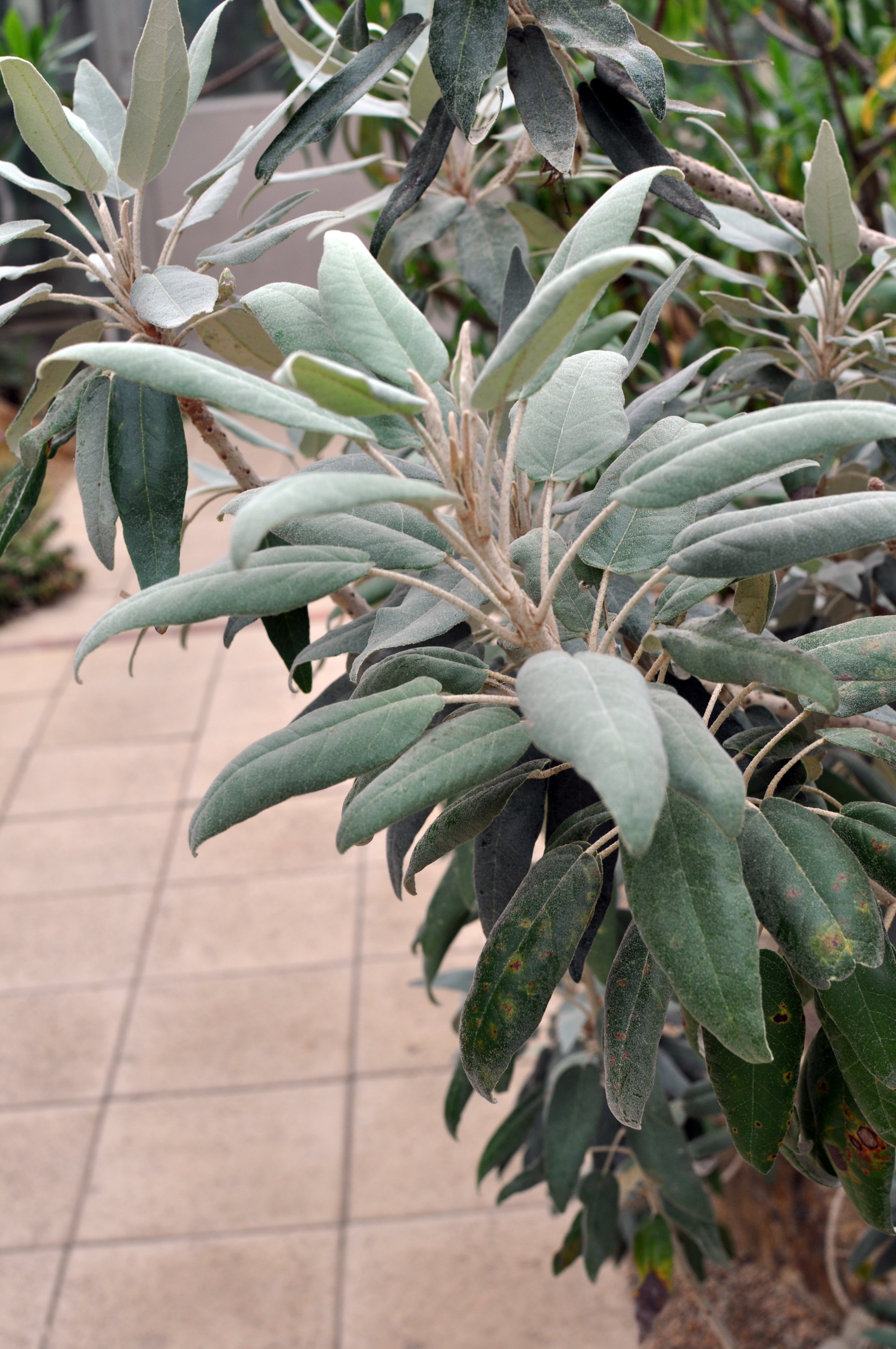
Leaf

It can reach a height up to 3 m. The leaves are oval shaped and due to its xerophyte adaptations it is leathery on the underparts. Also, stipules are present. The petals are between 5 and 6 cm and they grow asymmetrically. They are bell-shaped and their coloring is dark red with a white background. The capsule is globular and contains up to 10 black seeds. The flowering time of the plant is from June to October.

This plant is relatively rare because of its weak regeneration and due to introduced monkeys which feed on the flower buds. The only occurrences are on the slopes of Le Morne Brabant, Mauritius. Thanks to the efforts of botanist Joseph Gueho seeds were successfully germinated and grown in cultivation for the first time in 1973.

Ruizia boutoniana is the national flower of Mauritius since 1992 and it is often illustrated on stamps of Mauritius. It was named after French botanist Louis Bouton.
