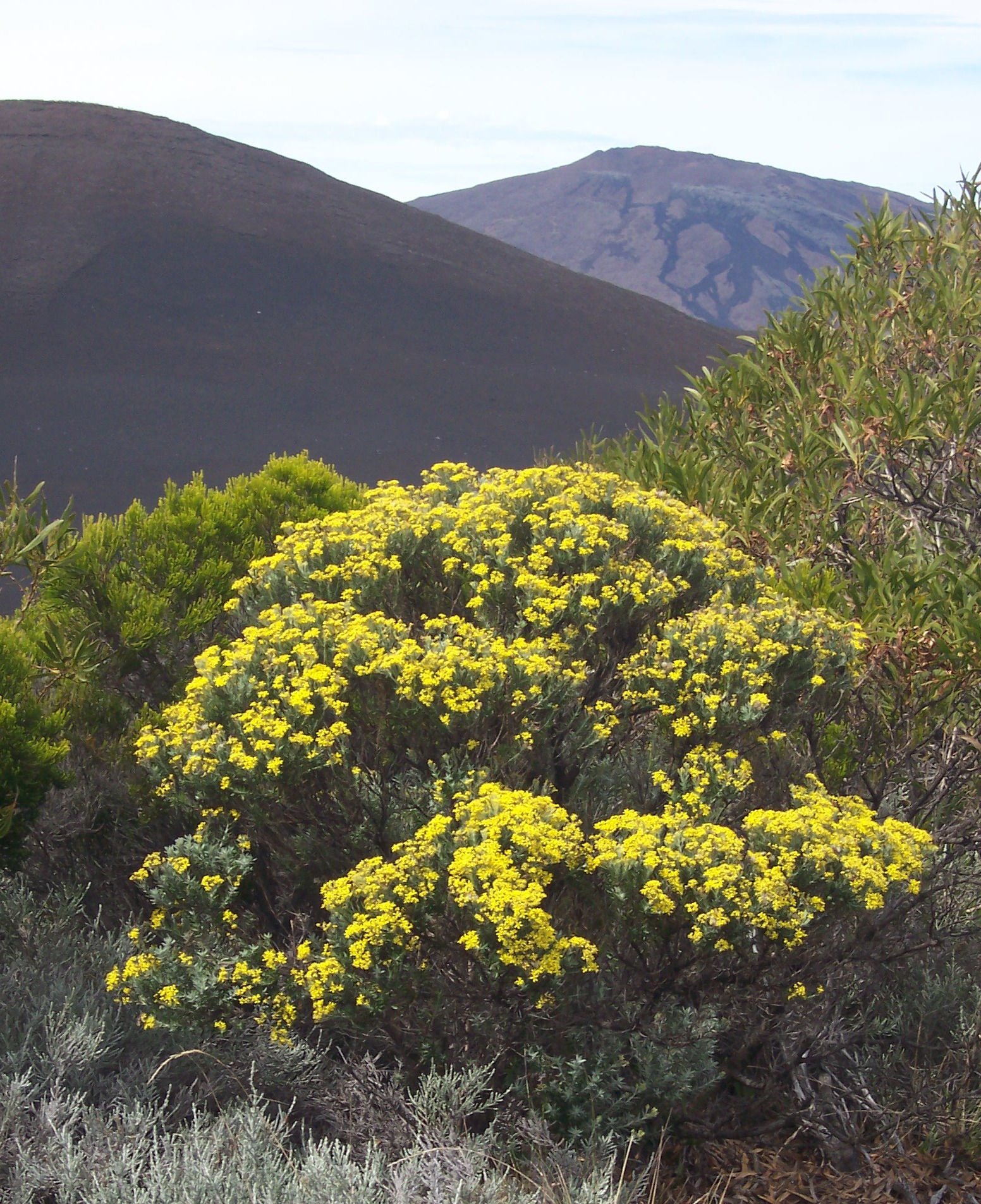
- Hubertia tomentosa

Scientific classification
- Kingdom: Plantae
- Clade: Embryophytes
- Clade: Tracheophytes
- Clade: Angiosperms
- Clade: Eudicots
- Clade: Asterids
- Order: Asterales
- Family: Asteraceae
- Subfamily: Asteroideae
- Tribe: Senecioneae
- Genus: Hubertia; Bory

= Hubertia =

Genus of flowering plants

Hubertia is a genus of flowering plants in the daisy family.

Species

- Hubertia adenodonta (DC.) C.Jeffrey – Madagascar
- Hubertia andringitrensis (Humbert) C.Jeffrey – Madagascar
- Hubertia bathiaei (Humbert) C.Jeffrey – Madagascar
- Hubertia beguei (Humbert) C.Jeffrey – Madagascar
- Hubertia faujasioides (Baker) C.Jeffrey – Madagascar
- Hubertia foliatilis (S.Moore) C.Jeffrey – Comoros
- Hubertia heimii (Humbert) C.Jeffrey – Madagascar
- Hubertia humblotii (Klatt) C.Jeffrey – Comoros
- Hubertia hypargyrea (DC.) C.Jeffrey – Madagascar
- Hubertia ivohibeensis (Humbert) C.Jeffrey – Madagascar
- Hubertia lapsanifolia (Baker) C.Jeffrey – Madagascar
- Hubertia leucanthothamnus (Humbert) C.Jeffrey – Madagascar
- Hubertia multifoliosa (Klatt) C.Jeffrey – Réunion
- Hubertia myrtifolia (Klatt) C.Jeffrey – Madagascar
- Hubertia neoheimii (Humbert) C.Jeffrey – Madagascar
- Hubertia riparia (DC.) C.Jeffrey- Madagascar
- Hubertia rosellata (Bojer ex DC.) C.Jeffrey – Madagascar
- Hubertia tomentosa Bory – Réunion
- Hubertia tsimihety (Humbert) C.Jeffrey – Madagascar
