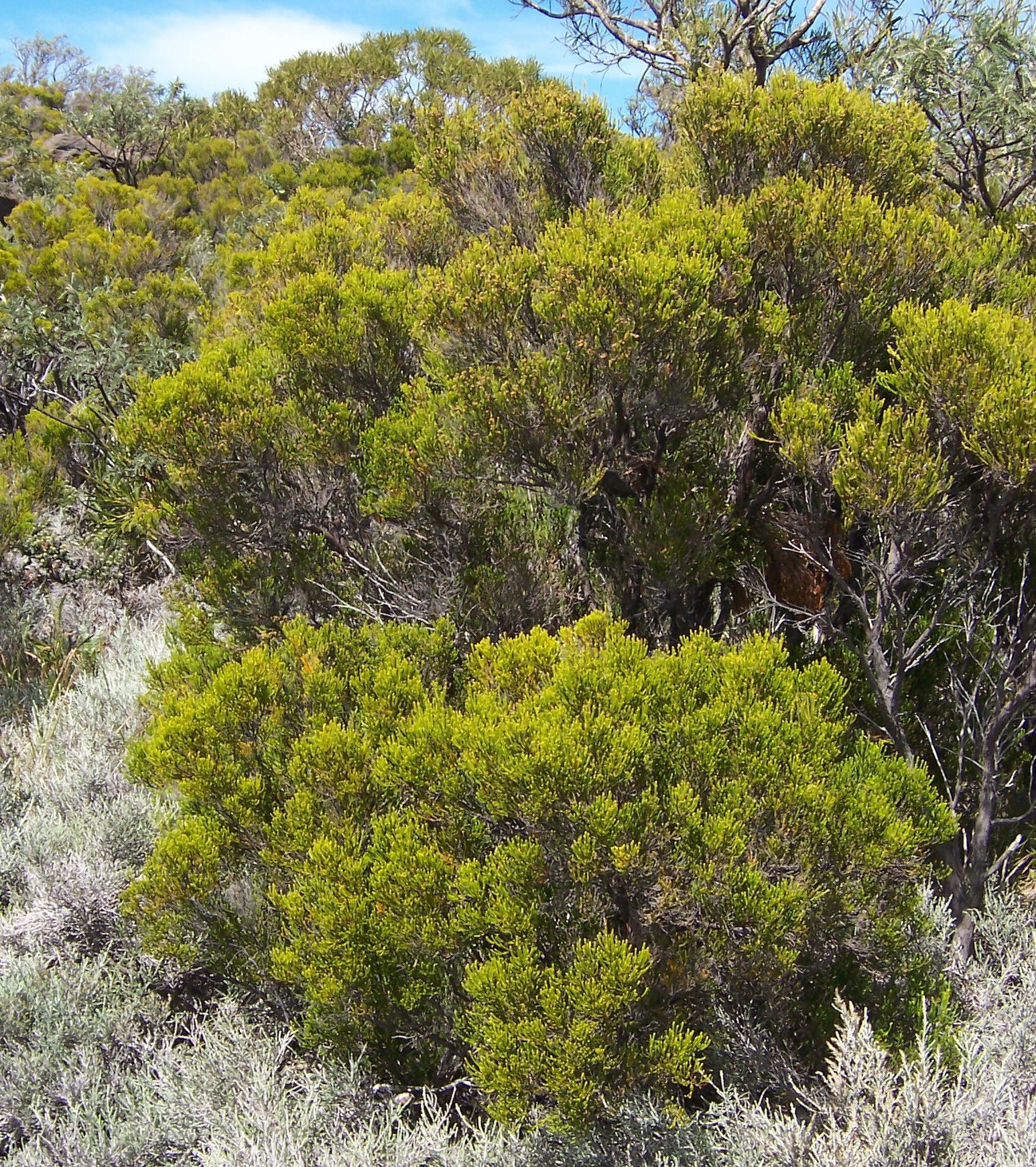

Scientific classification
- Kingdom: Plantae
- Clade: Tracheophytes
- Clade: Angiosperms
- Clade: Eudicots
- Clade: Asterids
- Order: Ericales
- Family: Ericaceae
- Genus: Erica
- Species: E. reunionensis

Binomial name
- Erica reunionensis E.G.H.Oliv. (1993)

Synonyms
- Philippia montana (Willd.) Klotzsch (1834); Salaxis montana Willd. (1809)

= Erica reunionensis =

Species of flowering plant

Erica reunionensis is a species of flowering plant (angiosperms) in the heather family (Ericaceae). It is a shrub endemic to the island of Réunion in the Indian Ocean.

Erica reunionensis is the dominant treeline species in the mountains of Réunion.
