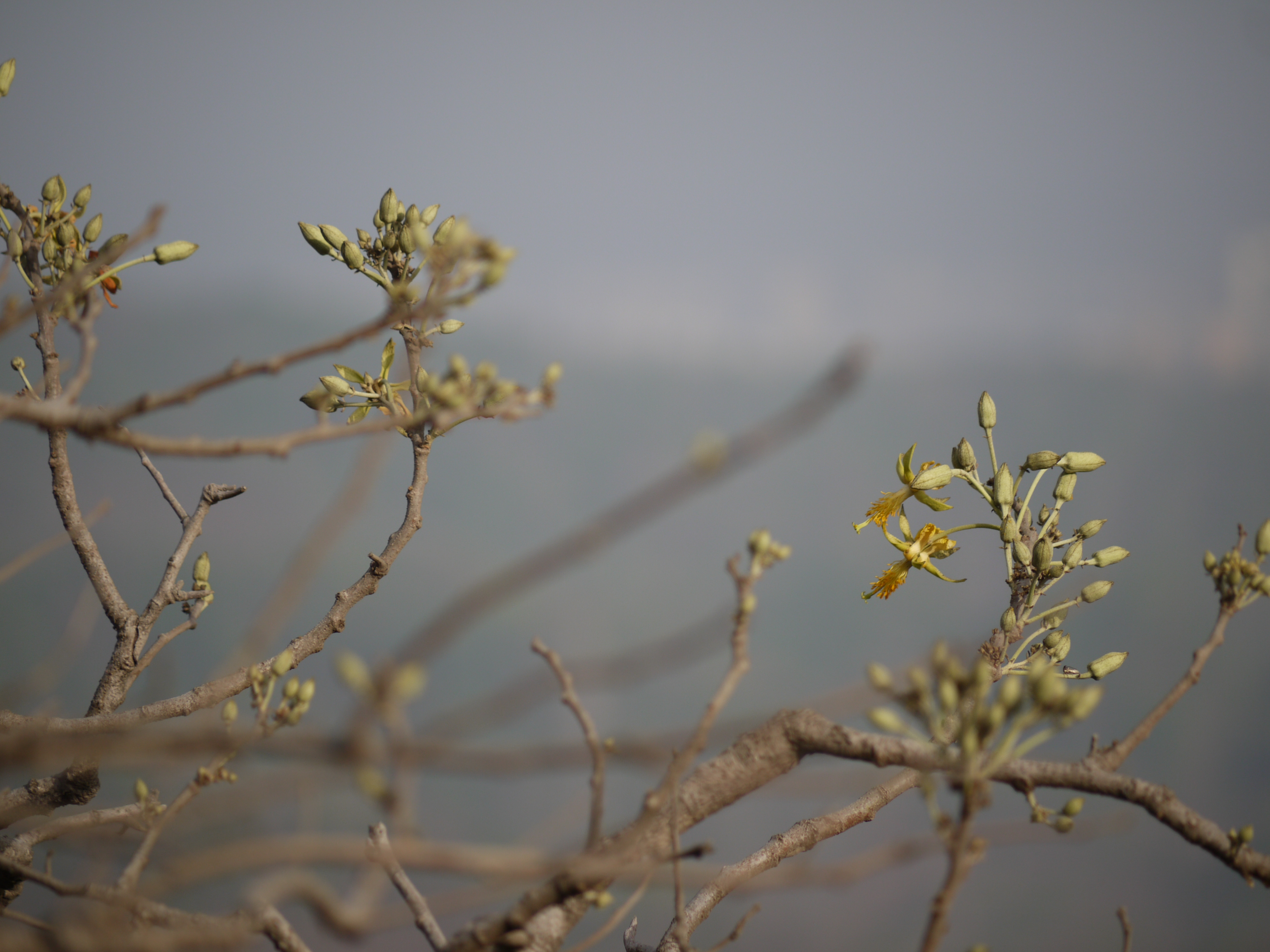
- Eriolaena quinquelocularis

Scientific classification
- Kingdom: Plantae
- Clade: Tracheophytes
- Clade: Angiosperms
- Clade: Eudicots
- Clade: Rosids
- Order: Malvales
- Family: Malvaceae
- Subfamily: Dombeyoideae
- Genus: Eriolaena; DC. (1823)

Species
- See text

Synonyms
- Dendroleandria Arènes (1956); Eriochlaena (orth. var.); Helmiopsiella Arènes (1956); Helmiopsis H.Perrier (1945); Jackia Spreng. nom. illeg.; Microchlaena Wall ex Wight & Arn. (1833), nom. superfl.; Schillera Rchb. (1828); Wallichia DC. (1823) (non Roxb.: preoccupied)

= Eriolaena =

Genus of flowering plants

Eriolaena is a genus of flowering plants. Traditionally included in the family Sterculiaceae, it is included now in the recently expanded Malvaceae. The genus is distributed in Asia and eastern Africa, from southern China through Indochina to India, Bangladesh, Nepal, Sri Lanka, Madagascar, and coastal Mozambique.

These plants are trees or shrubs. They usually have single or paired white or yellow flowers, but some species have larger inflorescences. The fruit is a hard capsule with winged seeds. The winged seeds make the genus distinctive in its family.

The former Madagascan genera Helmiopsiella and Helmiopsis are now considered synonyms of Eriolaena. These genera were named in honour of C. Helm, German clergyman in Berlin and amateur botanist.

== Species ==
27 species are currently accepted.

- Eriolaena barnettiae Dorr – Madagascar
- Eriolaena bernieri (Baill.) Dorr – northern Madagascar
- Eriolaena boivinii (Baill.) Dorr – northwestern Madagascar
- Eriolaena calcicola (Arènes) Dorr – northwestern Madagascar
- Eriolaena candollei Wall. – India and Bangladesh, Indochina, southern China
- Eriolaena cheekii Dorr – Madagascar
- Eriolaena ctenostegia (Hochr.) Dorr – western Madagascar
- Eriolaena glaberrima (Arènes) Dorr – northern Madagascar
- Eriolaena hily (Arènes) Dorr – southwestern and southern Madagascar
- Eriolaena hookeriana Wight & Arn. – India and Sri Lanka
- Eriolaena leandrii (Hochr.) Dorr – Madagascar
- Eriolaena linearifolia (Hochr.) Dorr – northern Madagascar
- Eriolaena lushingtonii Dunn – Eastern Ghats (southern India)
- Eriolaena madagascariensis (Arènes) Dorr – Madagascar
- Eriolaena margaritae Dorr – Madagascar
- Eriolaena parvifolia (Appleq.) Dorr – southwestern Madagascar
- Eriolaena poissonii (Arènes) Dorr – northwestern Madagascar
- Eriolaena polyandra (Appleq.) Dorr – northern Madagascar
- Eriolaena pseudopopulus (Baill.) Dorr – northern Madagascar
- Eriolaena quinquelocularis (Wight & Arn.) Drury – India and Yunnan (China)
- Eriolaena richardii (Baill.) Dorr – northern Madagascar
- Eriolaena rigida (Baill.) Dorr – Madagascar
- Eriolaena rulkensii Dorr – northern Mozambique
- Eriolaena spectabilis (DC.) Planch. ex Mast. – Himalayas (India, Nepal, Bhutan), northern Myanmar, Yunnan, Guizhou, and Guangxi (China)
- Eriolaena sphaerocarpa (L.C.Barnett) Dorr – northern Madagascar
- Eriolaena stocksii Hook.f. & Thomson ex Mast. – western and northeastern India
- Eriolaena wallichii DC. – Nepal, Arunachal Pradesh (India), northern Myanmar, Yunnan (China)
