= Corps de Garde =

Mountain in Mauritius

Coordinates: 20°15′08″S 57°27′02″E

Corps de Garde (translation: Guardhouse) is a 720-metre-high mountain of volcanic origin, in the area Palma in the Black River district of Mauritius. The name derived from the fact that a French military post was once established on its slope to control the bands of runaway slaves.

This basaltic rock formation has an imposing appearance which is characterized by an abruptly breakup of the slope towards the sea. It is resembling a figure of a guard with its beret sleeping on his abdomen and looking forward. It is also famous for a nature reserve of about 90.33 ha with a very rare flora such as Trochetia parviflora which was rediscovered on a mountain slope in 2001, Pilea trilobata which was rediscovered in 2005 and the Mandrinette. On the foot of that hill are the towns of Beau Bassin-Rose Hill and Quatre Bornes.

== Corps de Garde Nature Reserve ==
Corps de Garde Nature Reserve was designated in 1951. It covers an area of 0.9 km^{2} on the western and northwestern flank of the mountain.
