= Sterculiaceae =

Former family of flowering plants

Sterculiaceae was a family of flowering plant based on the genus Sterculia. Genera formerly included in Sterculiaceae are now placed in the family Malvaceae, in the subfamilies: Byttnerioideae, Dombeyoideae, Helicteroideae and Sterculioideae.

As traditionally circumscribed the Sterculiaceae, Malvaceae, Bombacaceae, and Tiliaceae comprise the "core Malvales" of the Cronquist system and the close relationship among these families is generally recognized. Sterculiaceae may be separated from Malvaceae sensu stricto by the smooth surface of the pollen grains and the bilocular anthers.

Numerous phylogenetic studies have revealed that Sterculiaceae, Tiliaceae and Bombacaceae as traditionally defined are cladistically polyphyletic. The APG and APG II systems unite Bombacaceae, Malvaceae sensu stricto, Sterculiaceae and Tiliaceae into a more widely circumscribed Malvaceae, i.e., Malvaceae sensu lato. In that view the taxa formerly classified in Sterculiaceae are treated in the subfamilies Byttnerioideae, Dombeyoideae, Helicteroideae and Sterculioideae of the Malvaceae sensu lato. The Thorne system takes an intermediate approach in combining the bulk of the traditional Sterculiaceae (but not including Sterculia itself) with elements of the traditional Tiliaceae to form the family Byttneriaceae.

Sterculiaceae had previously been recognized as a family by most systematists; in its traditional sense the family includes about 70 genera, totalling around 1,500 species of tropical trees and shrubs. The most famous products of the family are chocolate and cocoa from Theobroma cacao, followed by kola nuts. Many species yield timber.

A 2006 molecular study indicated the Sterculioideae was most likely to be a monophyletic group, and that it had four major clades within it. However, the relationships between the clades were not resolved.

== Genera ==
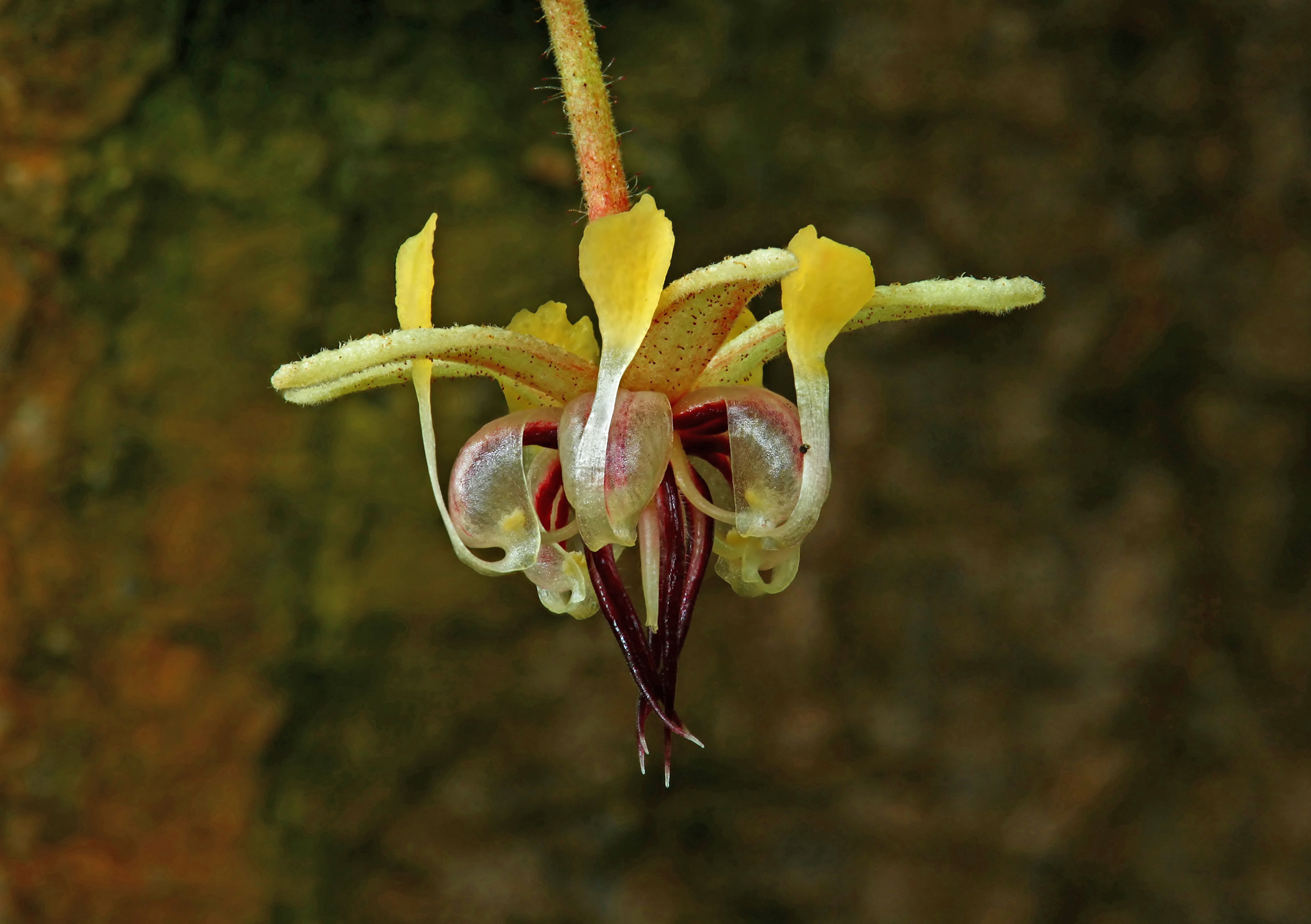
Cacao (Theobroma cacao) flower

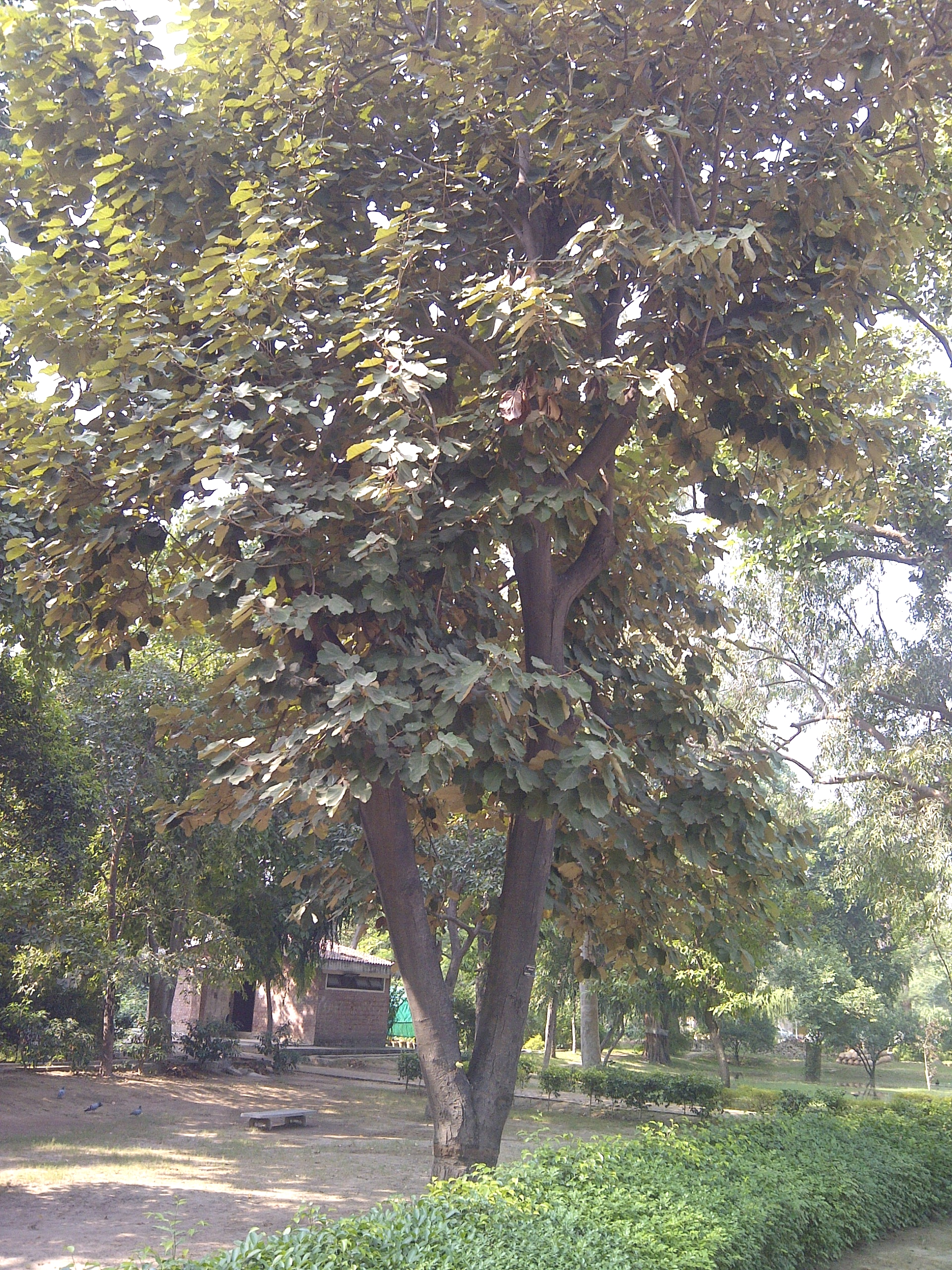
Sterculiaceae in Bagh-e-Jinnah, Lahore

- Abroma Jacq
- Acropogon Schltr
- Aethiocarpa Vollesen
- Astiria Lindl
- Ayenia L.
- Brachychiton Schott & Endl
- Byttneria Loefl
- Cheirolaena Benth
- Chiranthodendron Larreat
- Cola Schott & Endl
- Commersonia J.R.Forst. & G.Forst
- Cotylonychia Stapf
- Dicarpidium F.Muell
- Dombeya Cav.
- Eriolaena DC
- Firmiana Marsili
- Franciscodendron B.Hyland & Steenis
- Fremontodendron Coville
- Gilesia F.Muell
- Glossostemon Desf.
- Guazuma Mill.
- Guichenotia J.Gay
- Hannafordia F.Muell
- Harmsia K.Schum
- Helicteres L.
- Helmiopsiella Arenes
- Helmiopsis H.Perrier
- Heritiera Aiton
- Hermannia L.
- Herrania Goudot
- Hildegardia Schott & Endl
- Keraudrenia J.Gay
- Kleinhovia L.
- Lasiopetalum Sm.
- Leptonychia Turcz
- Leptonychiopsis Ridl
- Lysiosepalum F.Muell
- Mansonia J.R.Drumm. ex Prain
- Maxwellia Baill.
- Megatritheca Cristobal
- Melhania Forssk.
- Melochia L.
- Neoregnellia Urb.
- Nesogordonia Baill.
- Octolobus Welw.
- Paradombeya Stapf
- Paramelhania Arenes
- Pentapetes L.
- Pimia Seem.
- Pterocymbium R.Br.
- Pterospermum Schreb.
- Pterygota Schott & Endl
- Rayleya Cristobal
- Reevesia Lindl
- Ruizia Cav.
- Rulingia R.Br.
- Scaphium Schott & Endl
- Scaphopetalum Mast
- Seringia J.Gay
- Sterculia L.
- Theobroma L.
- Thomasia J.Gay
- Triplochiton K.Schum
- Trochetia DC
- Trochetiopsis Marais
- Ungeria Schott & Endl
- Waltheria L.

== See also ==
- Malvales
- APG IV system
- Cronquist system
- Plant taxonomy
- Phylogenetic nomenclature
- Monophyly
