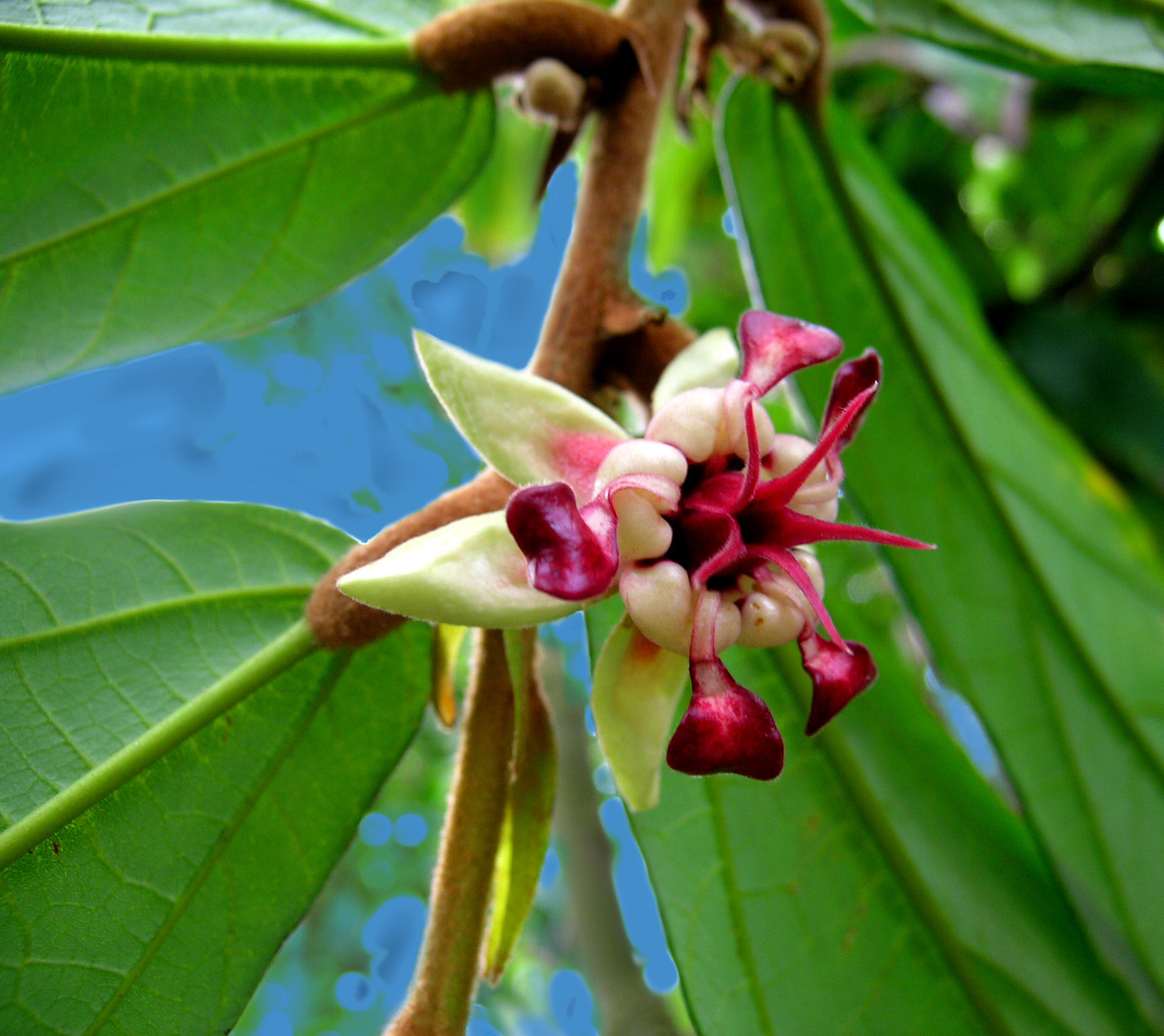
- Cupuaçu (Theobroma grandiflorum)

Scientific classification
- Kingdom: Plantae
- Clade: Tracheophytes
- Clade: Angiosperms
- Clade: Eudicots
- Clade: Rosids
- Order: Malvales
- Family: Malvaceae
- Subfamily: Byttnerioideae; Burnett

Tribes
- Byttnerieae; Hermannieae; Lasiopetaleae; Theobromateae

= Byttnerioideae =

Subfamily of flowering plants

Byttnerioideae is a subfamily of the flowering plant family Malvaceae.

Byttneria is the type genus for the subfamily. Byttneria is now treated as synonym of Ayenia.

== Tribes and genera ==
Four tribes are recognised by the Germplasm Resources Information Network:

=== Byttnerieae ===
- Abroma Jacq.
- Ayenia L.
- Byttneria Loefl. (synonym of Ayenia)
- Kleinhovia L.
- Leptonychia Turcz.
- Megatritheca Cristóbal
- Rayleya Cristóbal (synonym of Ayenia)
- Scaphopetalum Mast.

=== Hermannieae ===
- Dicarpidium F.Muell.
- Gilesia F.Muell.
- Hermannia L.
- Melochia L.
- Waltheria L.

=== Lasiopetaleae ===
- Commersonia J.R.Forst. & G.Forst.
- Guichenotia J.Gay
- Hannafordia F.Muell.
- Keraudrenia J.Gay (synonym of Seringia)
- Lasiopetalum Sm.
- Lysiosepalum F.Muell.
- Maxwellia Baill.
- Rulingia R.Br.
- Seringia J.Gay
- Thomasia J.Gay

=== Theobromateae ===
- Glossostemon Desf.
- Guazuma Mill.
- Herrania Goudot
- Theobroma L.
