= Scaphopetalum blackii =

Conservation status
- Least Concern (IUCN 3.1)

Scientific classification
- Kingdom: Plantae
- Clade: Tracheophytes
- Clade: Angiosperms
- Clade: Eudicots
- Clade: Rosids
- Order: Malvales
- Family: Malvaceae
- Genus: Scaphopetalum
- Species: S. blackii

Binomial name
- Scaphopetalum blackii Mast.

Species of flowering plant

Scaphopetalum blackii is a species of flowering plant in the family Malvaceae. It was first formally described by Maxwell T. Masters in 1867.
