= Scaphopetalum parvifolium =

Conservation status
- Vulnerable (IUCN 2.3)

Scientific classification
- Kingdom: Plantae
- Clade: Tracheophytes
- Clade: Angiosperms
- Clade: Eudicots
- Clade: Rosids
- Order: Malvales
- Family: Malvaceae
- Genus: Scaphopetalum
- Species: S. parvifolium

Binomial name
- Scaphopetalum parvifolium Baker f.

Species of flowering plant

Scaphopetalum parvifolium is a species of plant in the family Malvaceae. It is endemic to Nigeria. It is threatened by habitat loss.
