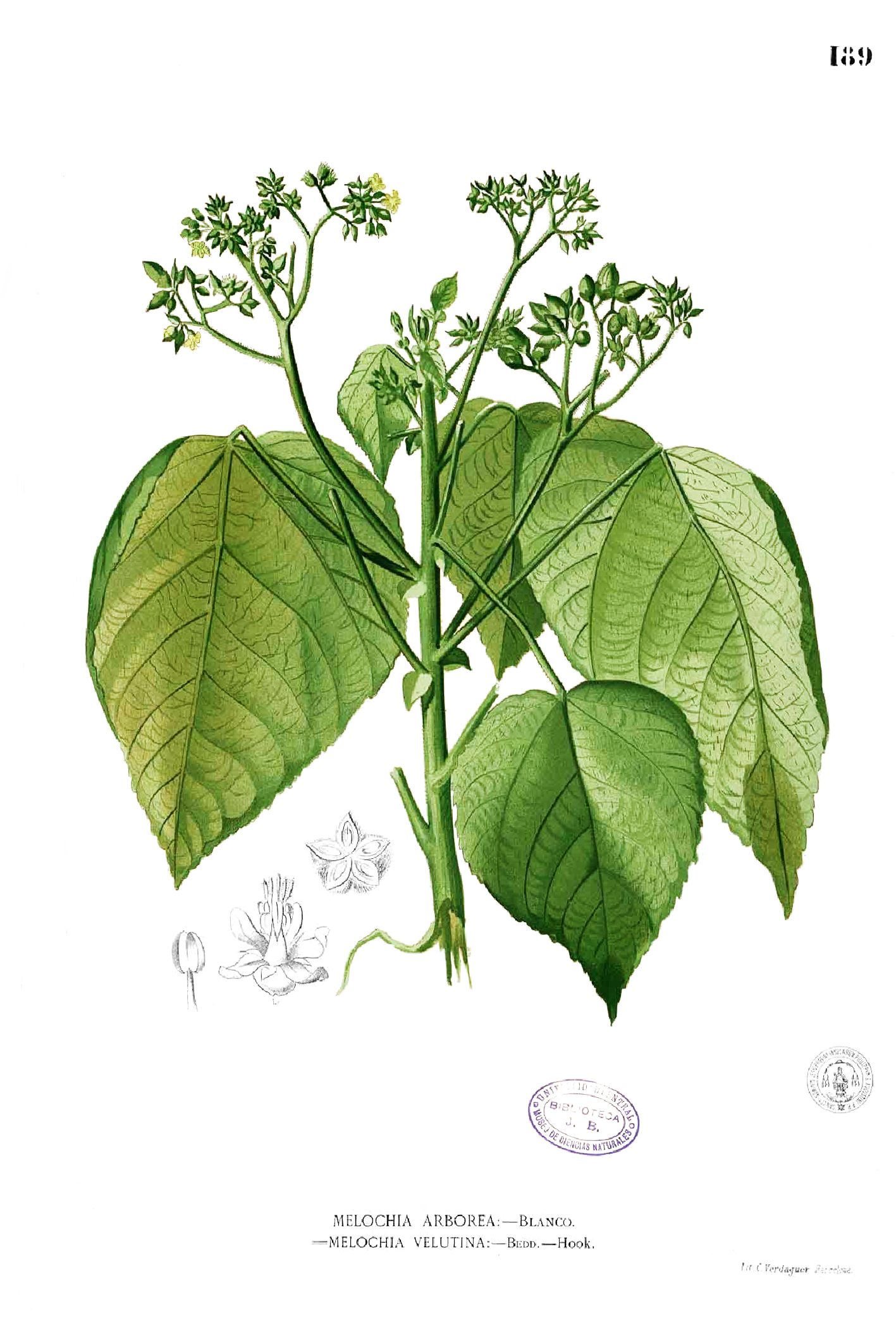
- Melochia arborea, plate from Flora de Filipinas (1880-1883) by Francisco Manuel Blanco

Scientific classification
- Kingdom: Plantae
- Clade: Tracheophytes
- Clade: Angiosperms
- Clade: Eudicots
- Clade: Rosids
- Order: Malvales
- Family: Malvaceae
- Subfamily: Byttnerioideae
- Tribe: Hermannieae
- Genus: Melochia; L. (1753)

Species
- See text

Synonyms
- List: Aleurodendron Reinw.; Altheria Thouars; Anamorpha H.Karst. & Triana; Lochemia Arn.; Meluchia Medik.; Moluchia Medik.; Mougeotia Kunth; Physocodon Turcz.; Polychlaena G.Don; Riedlea Vent.; Riedleja Hassk.; Visenia Houtt.

= Melochia =

Genus of flowering plants

Melochia is a genus of flowering plants in the mallow family, Malvaceae. It comprises 54 species from the tropical and subtropical regions of the world, ranging from India eastwards through Malesia and the Pacific Islands to the Americas and the Caribbean.

Some taxonomy books have placed genus Melochia in the family Sterculiaceae, but Sterculiaceae is now generally considered obsolete as a taxonomic class.

The name "Melochia" comes from the Arabic name Mulukhiyah which in Arabic means mallow plants of the genus Corchorus (including Corchorus olitorius) which are cultivated as vegetables in Egypt (and elsewhere). The take-up of this Arabic Molokheya as a label for the Melochia mallow plants began with the Latin botanist Prospero Alpini (died 1617), who spent several years in Egypt in the 1580s, and Alpini's name was soon adopted by the botanists Johann Bauhin (died 1613), Caspar Bauhin (died 1624), and Johann Vesling (visited Egypt 1628; died 1649).

== Species ==
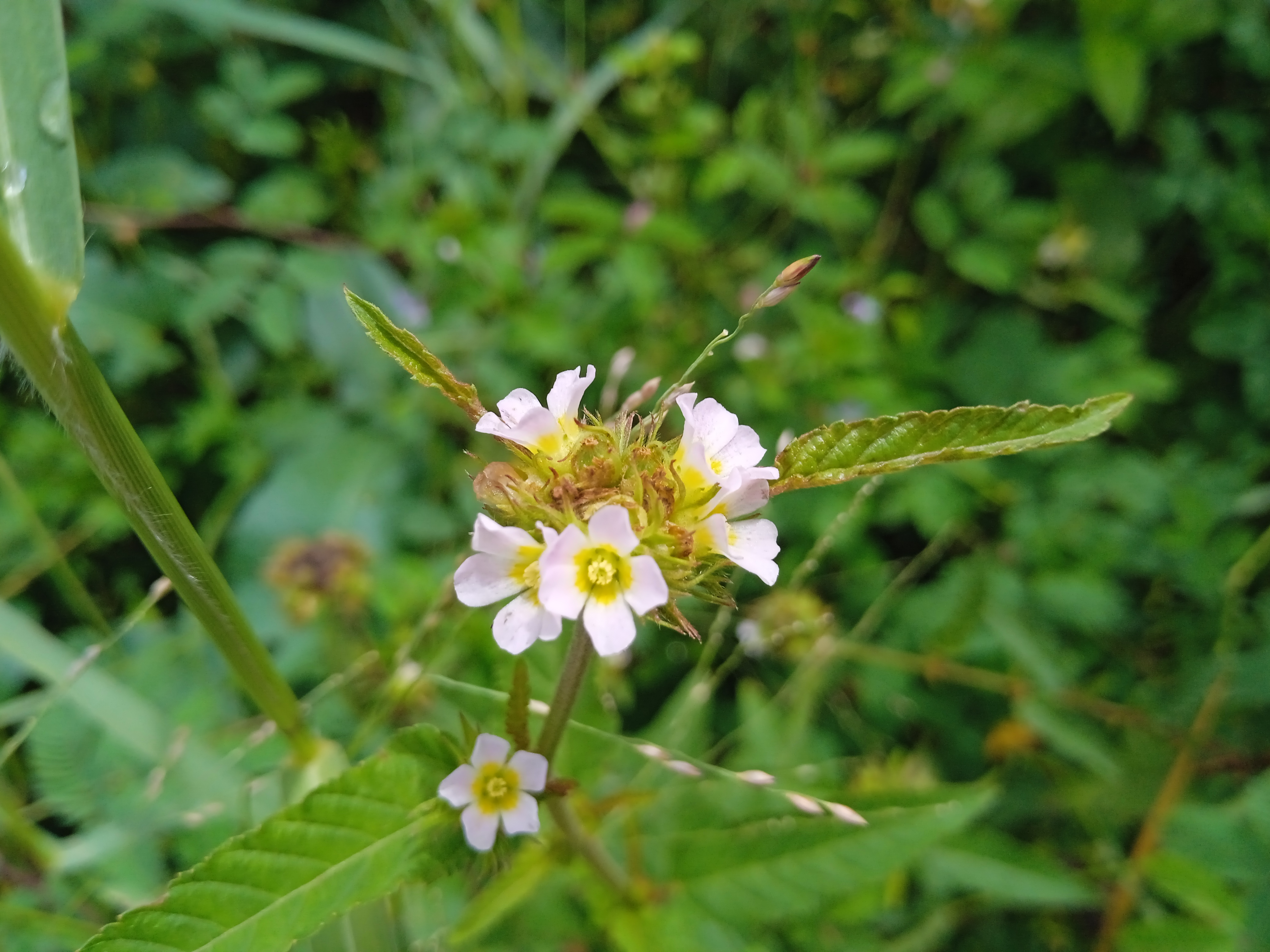
Melochia corchorifolia

The following species are recognised in the genus Melochia:

- Melochia anomala Griseb.
- Melochia arenosa Benth.
- Melochia argentina R.E.Fr.
- Melochia bernoulliana Donn.Sm.
- Melochia betonicifolia A.St.-Hil.
- Melochia betsiliensis Baker
- Melochia bissei A.Rodr.
- Melochia canescens Cristóbal
- Melochia caracasana Jacq.
- Melochia chamaedrys A.St.-Hil.
- Melochia colombiana Cuatrec.
- Melochia corchorifolia L.
- Melochia crenata Vahl
- Melochia degeneriana A.C.Sm.
- Melochia gardneri Sprague
- Melochia goldbergii Cristóbal
- Melochia graminifolia A.St.-Hil.
- Melochia grayana A.C.Sm.
- Melochia hassleriana Chodat
- Melochia hermannioides A.St.-Hil.
- Melochia illicioides K.Schum.
- Melochia kerriifolia Triana & Planch.
- Melochia lanata A.St.-Hil.
- Melochia lanceolata Benth.
- Melochia leucantha J.F.Macbr.
- Melochia longepetiolata A.C.Sm.
- Melochia longibracteolata Arènes
- Melochia longidentata Goldberg
- Melochia lupulina Sw.
- Melochia manducata C.Wright
- Melochia melissifolia Benth.
- Melochia ministella Cristóbal
- Melochia mollipila A.C.Sm.
- Melochia mollis (Kunth) Triana & Planch.
- Melochia morongii Britton
- Melochia nodiflora Sw.
- Melochia nudiflora Standl. & L.O.Williams
- Melochia oaxacana Dorr & L.C.Barnett
- Melochia odorata L.f.
- Melochia parhamii A.C.Sm.
- Melochia parvifolia Kunth
- Melochia peruviana Desr.
- Melochia pilosa (Mill.) Fawc. & Rendle
- Melochia pterocarpa Arènes
- Melochia pulverulenta Miers
- Melochia pyramidata L.
- Melochia roseiflora A.C.Sm.
- Melochia savannarum Britton
- Melochia sergipana Monteiro
- Melochia simplex A.St.-Hil.
- Melochia speciosa S.Watson
- Melochia splendens A.St.-Hil. & Naudin
- Melochia taiwaniana S.S.Ying
- Melochia thymifolia (C.Presl) Goldberg
- Melochia tomentella (C.Presl) Hemsl.
- Melochia tomentosa L.
- Melochia trujilloi J.B.Rondón & Cumaná
- Melochia ulmifolia Benth.
- Melochia umbellata (Houtt.) Stapf
- Melochia urticifolia (Turcz.) Standl.
- Melochia villosa (Mill.) Fawc. & Rendle
- Melochia villosissima (C.Presl) Merr. – endemic to western Micronesian islands
- Melochia werdermannii Goldberg

=== Formerly placed here ===
- Sida cordata (Burm.f.) Borss.Waalk. (as M. cordata Burm.f.)
