= Revalenta arabica =

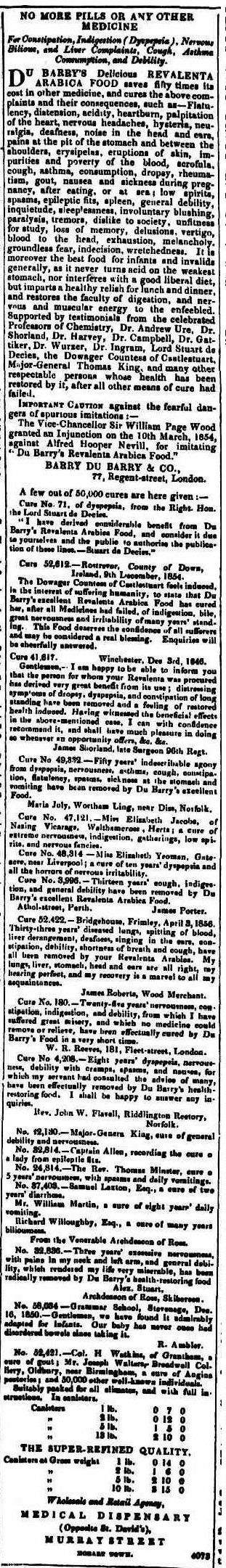
Classified ad for Revalenta arabica from The Courier (Hobart, Tasmania) November 1, 1856, p. 4.

Revalenta Arabica, or Ervalenta, was a preparation sold in the 18th century as an empirical diet for patients. It was sold as a cure-all, supposedly effective at treating diseases of the blood, brain, kidney, liver, lungs, nerves, glands, mucous membranes, and stomach.

The product that was mass-marketed was, in reality, only a preparation of the common lentil, its first name being formed for disguise by the transposition of its earlier botanical name, Ervum lens. While lentils are a healthy and nutritious food, Revalenta Arabica's value was about similar to the common pea-meal (or ground split peas).

== Original ==
The real Revalenta arabica is the "root" of Glossostemon bruguieri. The roots were sold under the name Arabgossi. In Egypt, they are known as Moghat. The original plant of the product was unknown for a long time, until the German explorer of Africa and botanist Georg Schweinfurth discovered Glossostemon bruguieri as its source.

They are prepared as a light dish for ailing or ill persons. Plant and usage had been described in Firdous al-Hikmah ("Paradise of Wisdom") of Ali al-Tabari, a medicinal encyclopedia from the 9th century AD.
