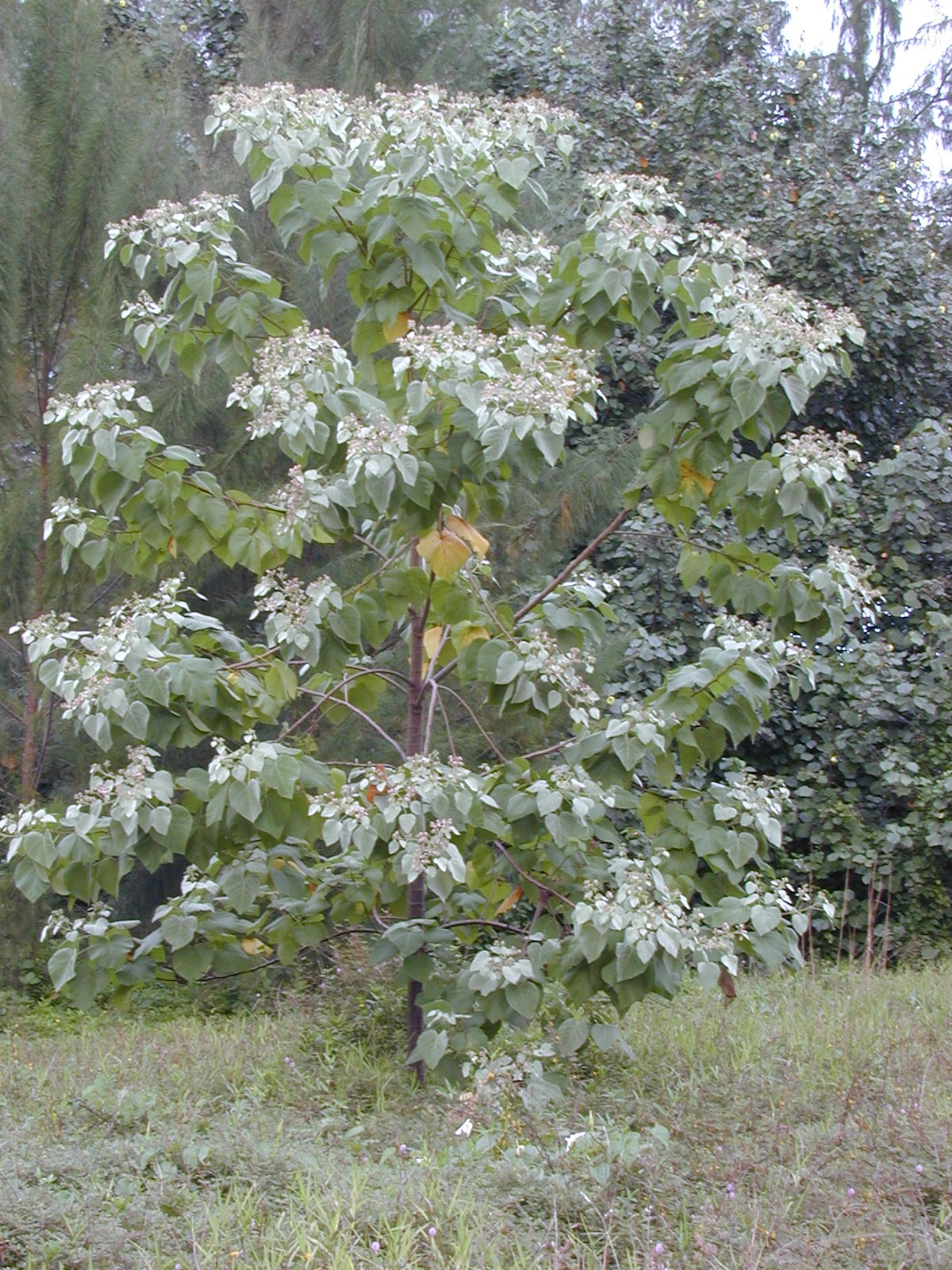

Scientific classification
- Kingdom: Plantae
- Clade: Tracheophytes
- Clade: Angiosperms
- Clade: Eudicots
- Clade: Rosids
- Order: Malvales
- Family: Malvaceae
- Genus: Melochia
- Species: M. umbellata

Binomial name
- Melochia umbellata (Houtt.) Stapf

Synonyms
- Visenia indica C.C.Gimelin; Visenia umbellata Houtt.; Melochia indica (Gmel.) Kurz.

= Melochia umbellata =

Species of flowering plant

Melochia umbellata is a species of flowering plant in the mallow family, Malvaceae. Its specific epithet comes from the Latin umbellatus (umbel-like), referring to the inflorescence.

== Description ==
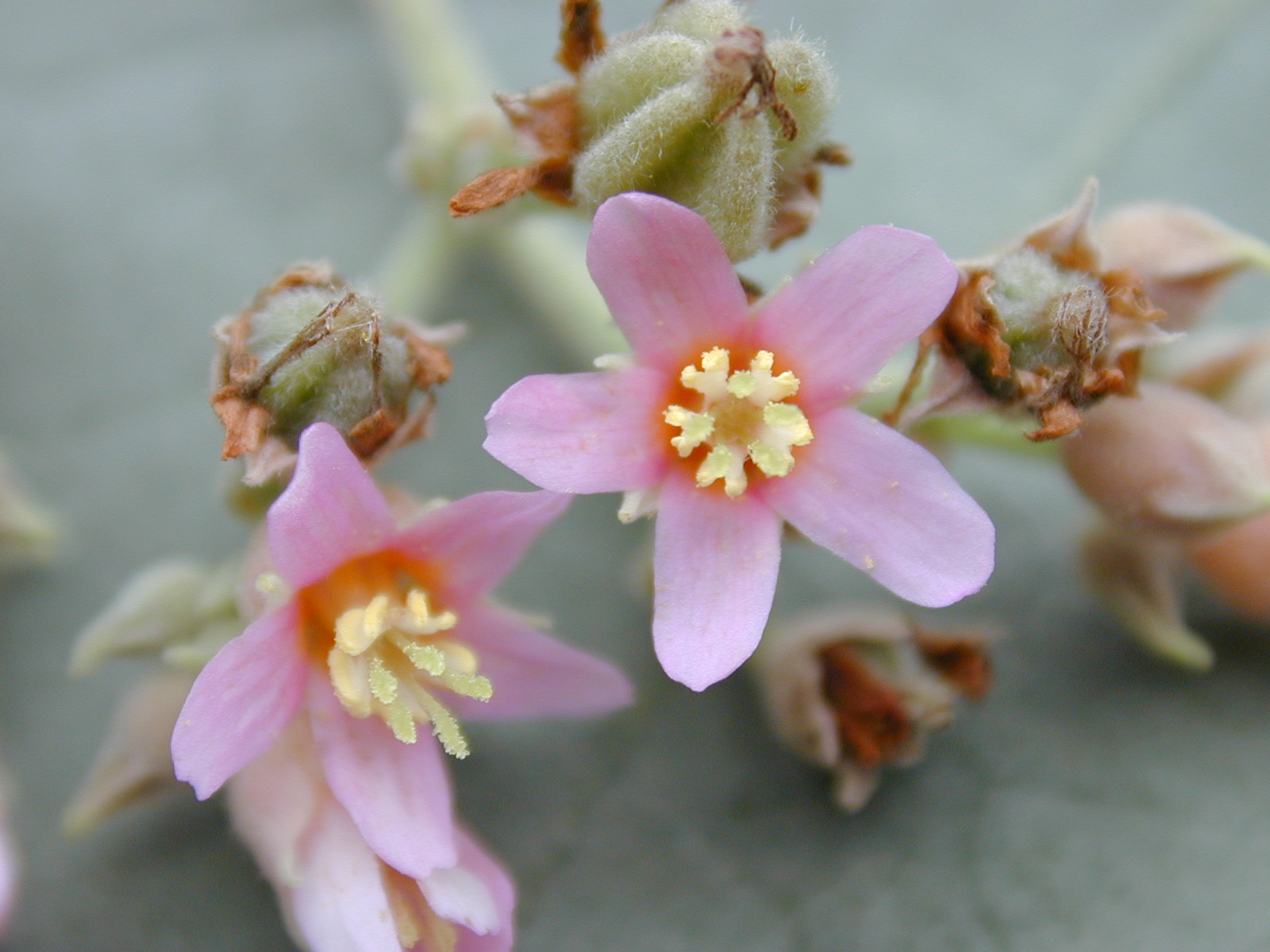
Flowers

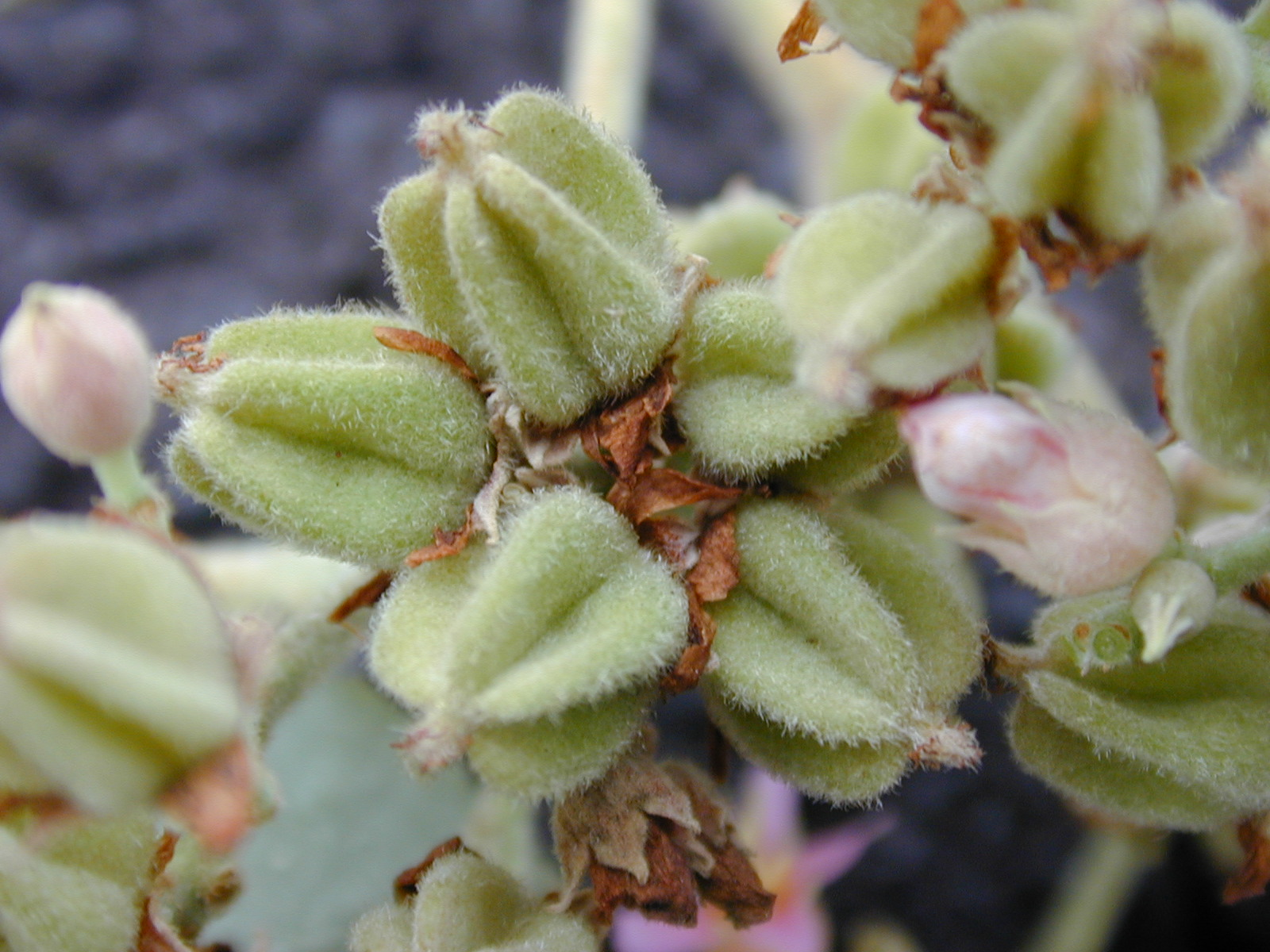
Fruits

Melochia umbellata is a shrub or small tree, growing to 2–15 m (6 ft 7 in – 49 ft 3 in) in height. It grows rapidly and is able to colonise disturbed land. It has large, broadly ovate, leaves 90–300 mm long. The flowers are usually pale pink to red. The seeds are winged and wind-dispersed.

== Distribution and habitat ==
The plant is native to a region extending from India eastwards through Southeast Asia to north-western Australia and New Guinea. It occurs in secondary vegetation and forest clearings, on rocky slopes and along the edges of rivers and forests, often in seasonally dry soil.

It has been introduced elsewhere and is cultivated widely to provide shade for young trees in timber and coffee plantations. Melochia is relished by ruminants when offered as a cut-and-carry feed. It has become an invasive weed on the Island of Hawaiʻi where it was extensively planted in the Hilo area during a 1920s reforestation program.
