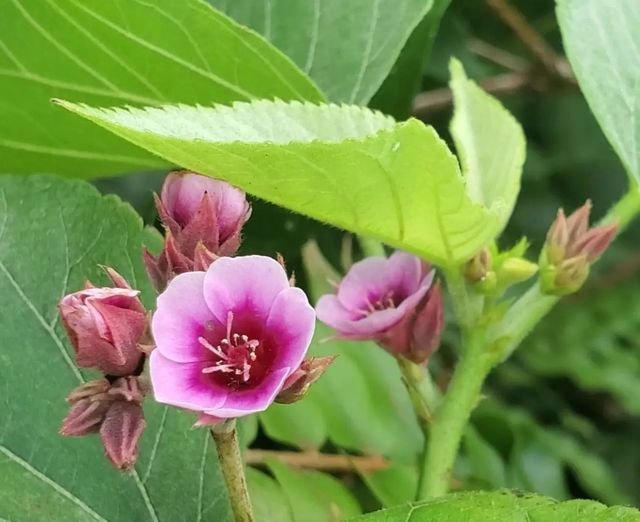
- Flowers and buds. Dededo, Guam.

Conservation status
- Least Concern (IUCN 3.1)

Scientific classification
- Kingdom: Plantae
- Clade: Tracheophytes
- Clade: Angiosperms
- Clade: Eudicots
- Clade: Rosids
- Order: Malvales
- Family: Malvaceae
- Genus: Melochia
- Species: M. villosissima

Binomial name
- Melochia villosissima (C.Presl) Merr.

Synonyms
- Melochia compacta var. villosissima (C.Presl) B.C.Stone; Riedlea villosissima C.Presl; Melochia compacta Hochr.; Melochia hirsutissima Merr.; Melochia villosissima var. compacta (Hochr.) Fosberg

= Melochia villosissima =

Species of plant of the Pacific islands

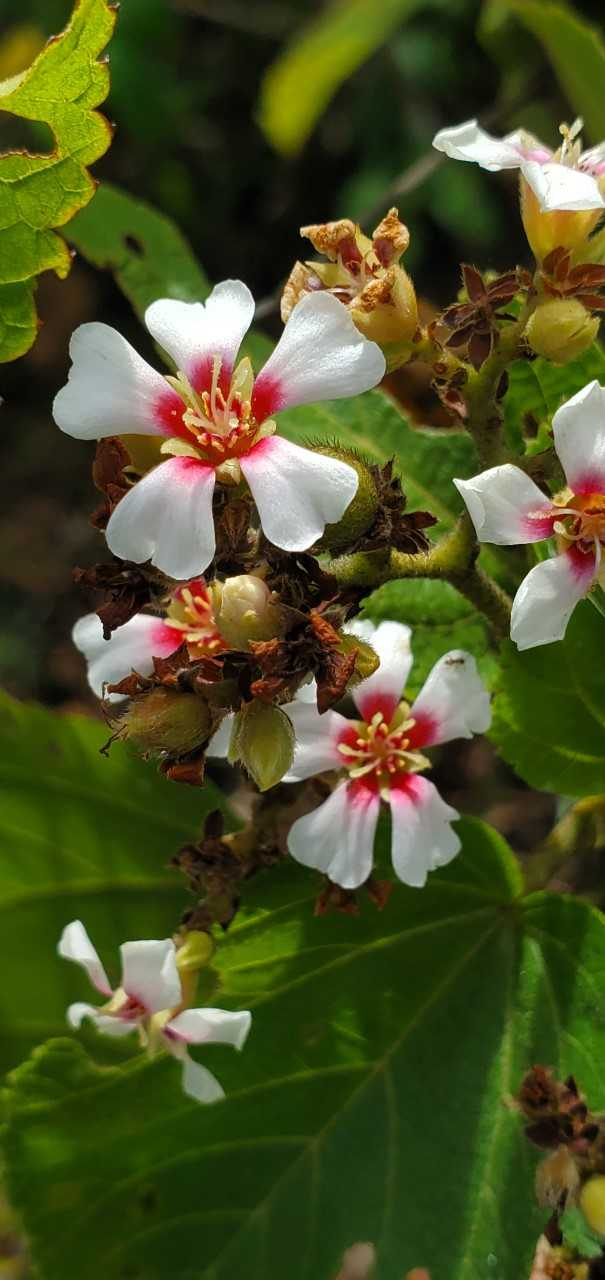
Melochia villosissima flower, Asan Beach Park, Guam

Melochia villosissima (Chamorro: sayåfi), is a tree endemic to northwest Pacific Ocean islands, including South Iwo Jima and western Micronesian Islands (Caroline and Mariana Islands). It is a small pioneer tree often found along roadsides and has a striking appearance due to its clusters of pink flowers.

The Chamorro name for the plant was transliterated into French as sidjiafi by the French botanist, Charles Gaudichaud-Beaupré, during his exploration of Guam in 1819.

== Gallery ==
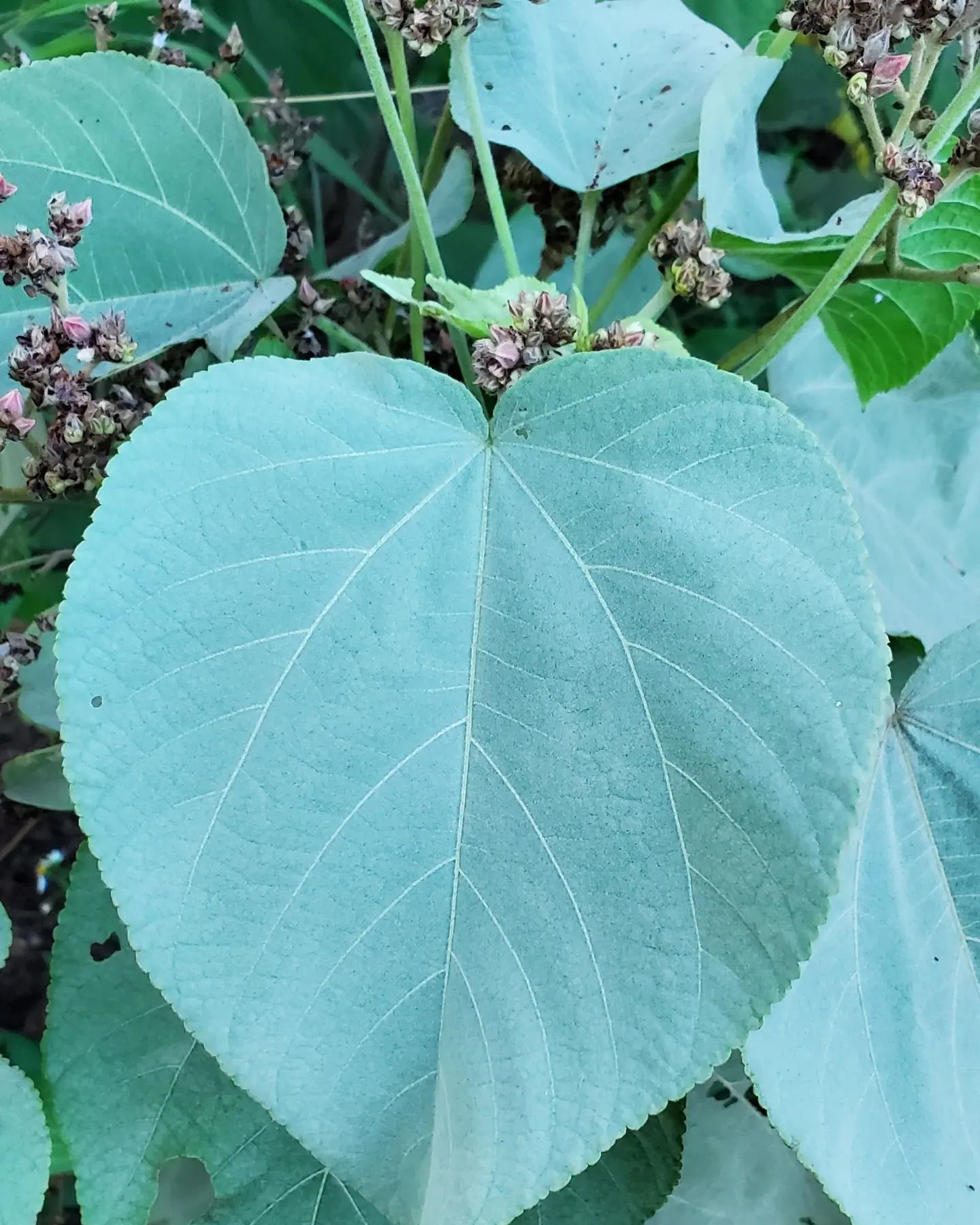
Hirsute (fuzzy) leaf. Dededo, Guam

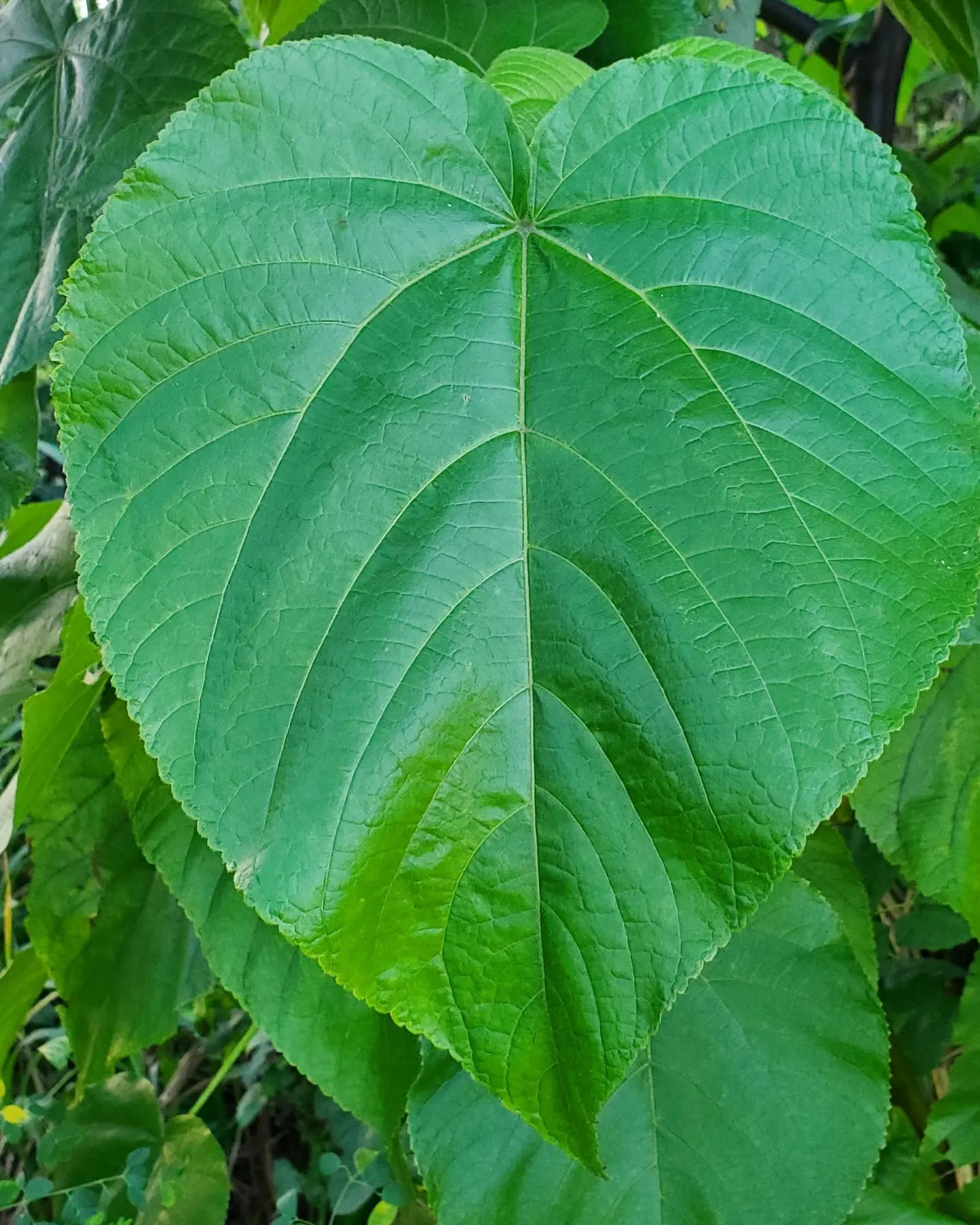
Glabrous (smooth) leaf. Dededo, Guam.

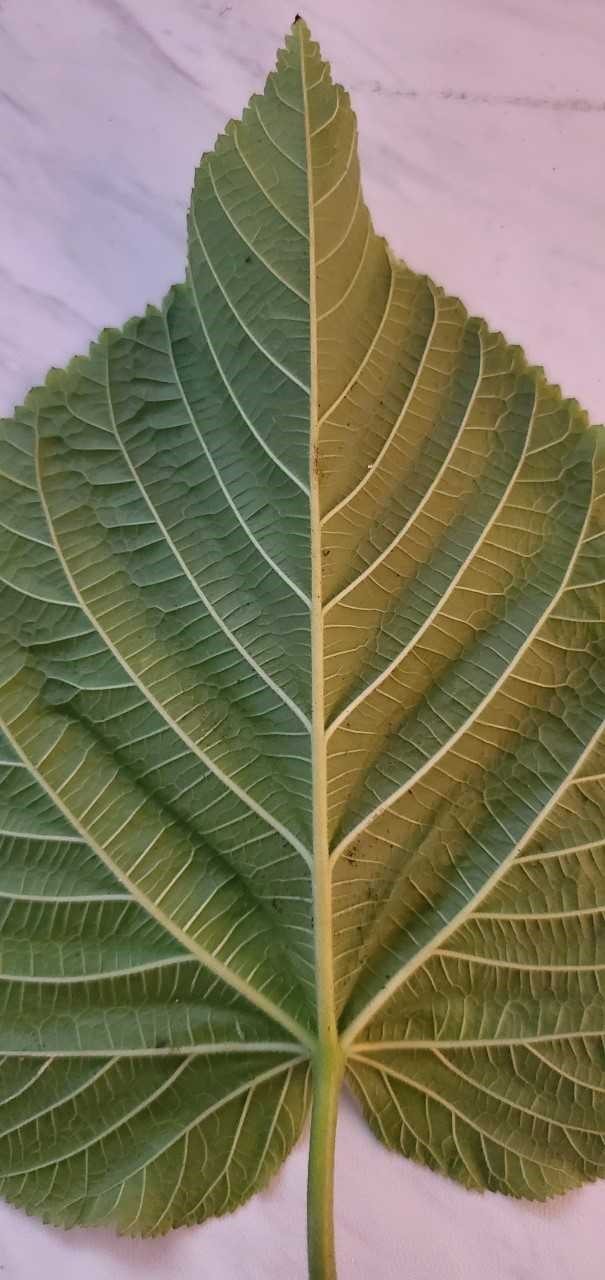
Leaf underside

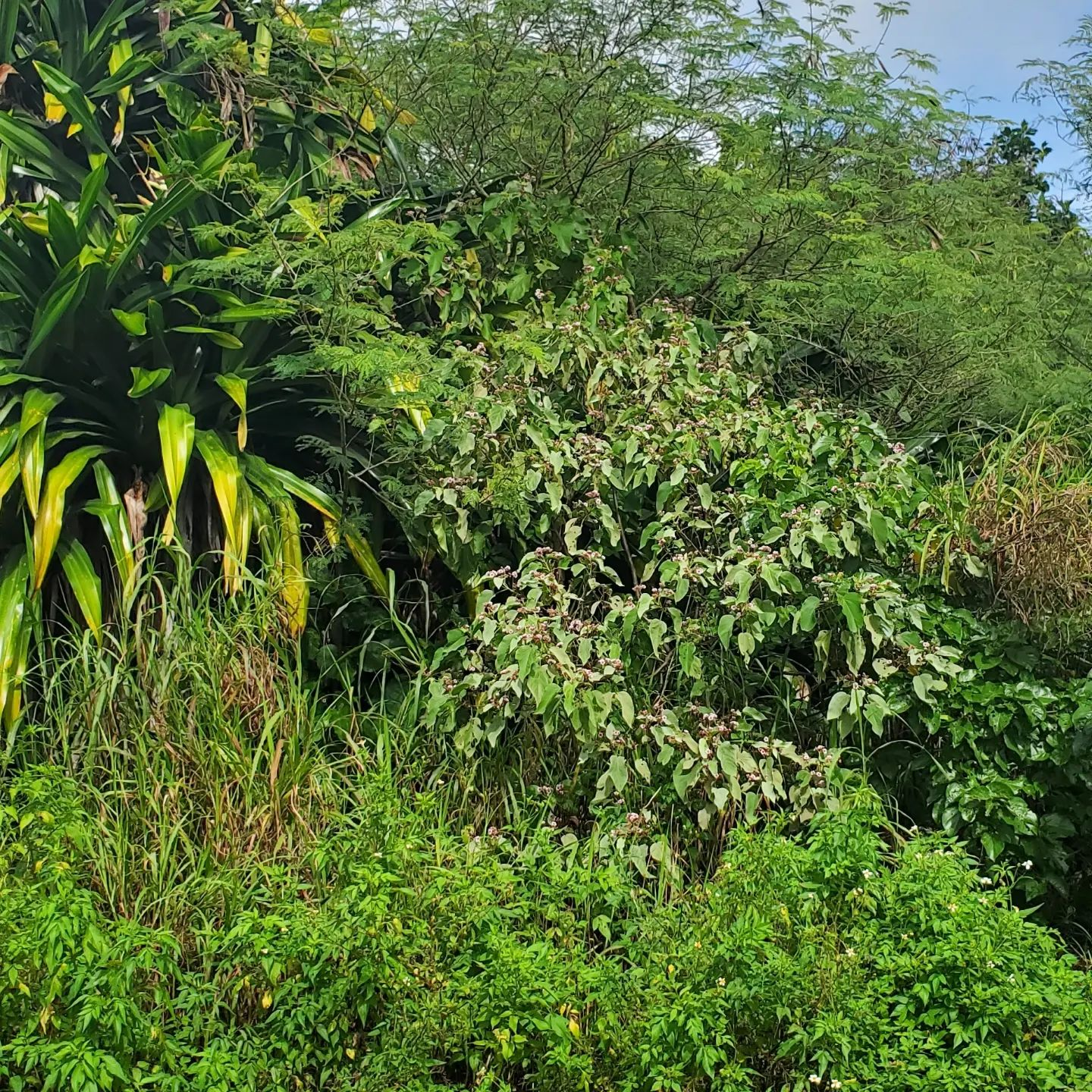
Tree along roadside in Dededo, Guam.

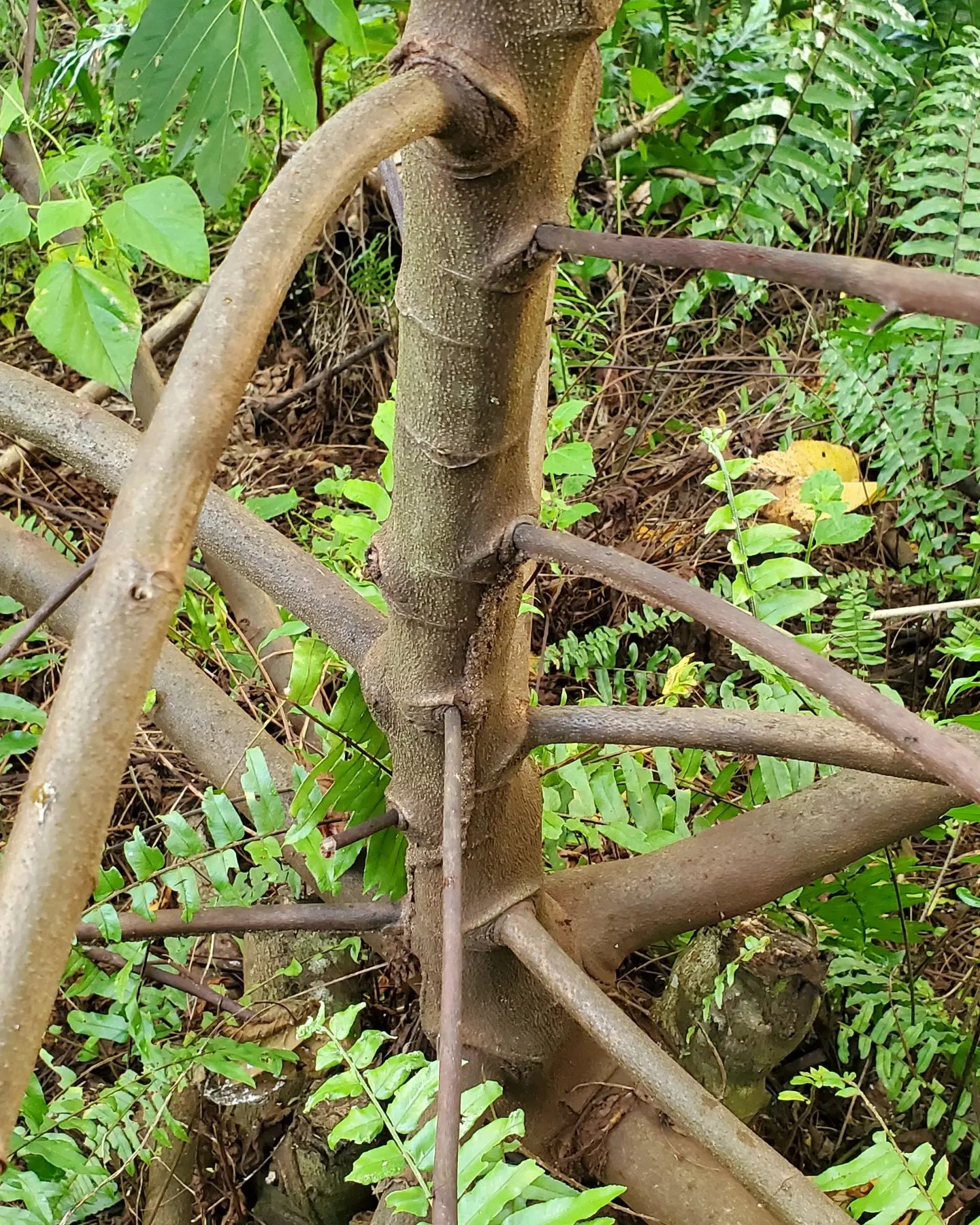
Low branching habit. Dededo, Guam.

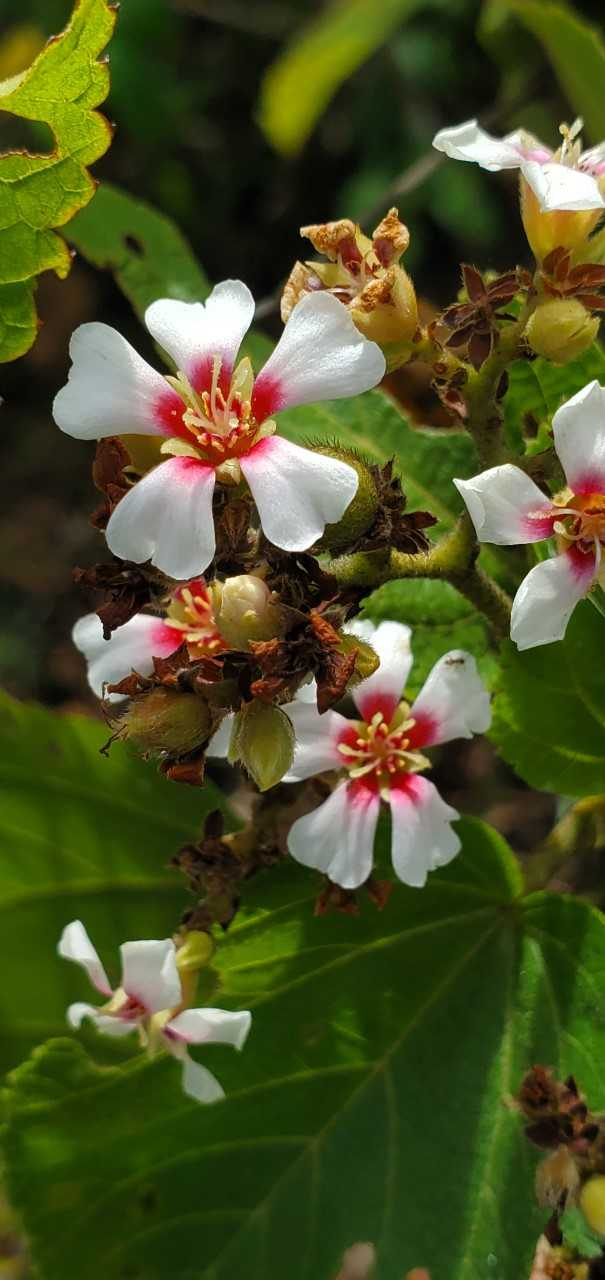
White flowered variety. Asan Beach Park, Guam

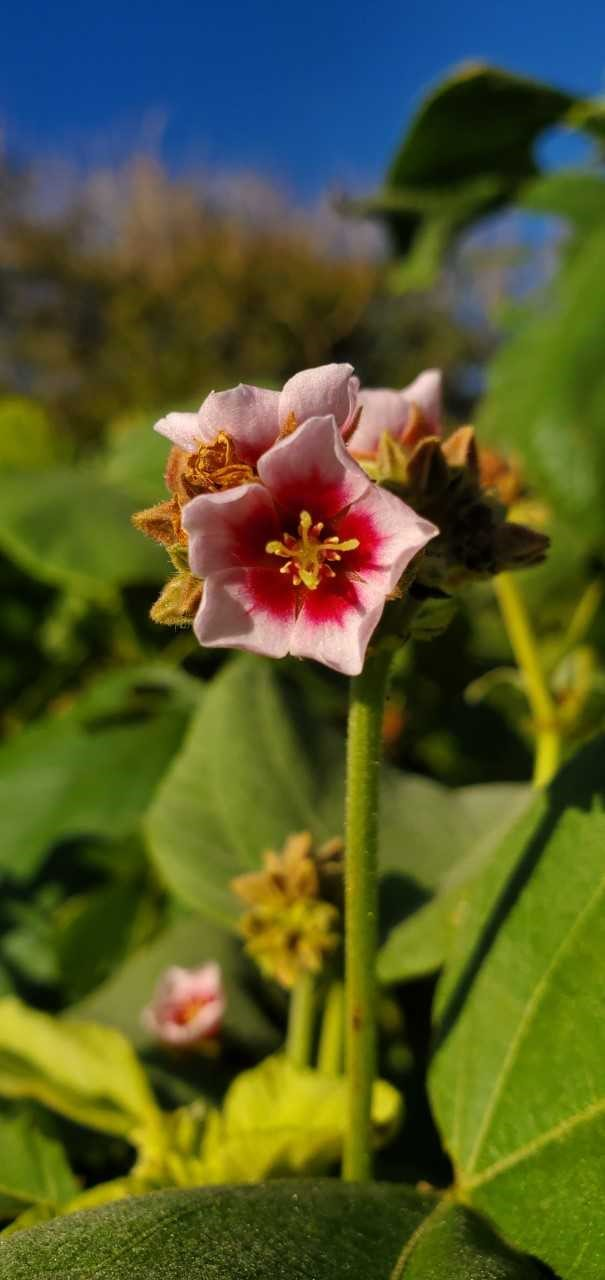
Pink flowered variety. Dededo, Guam

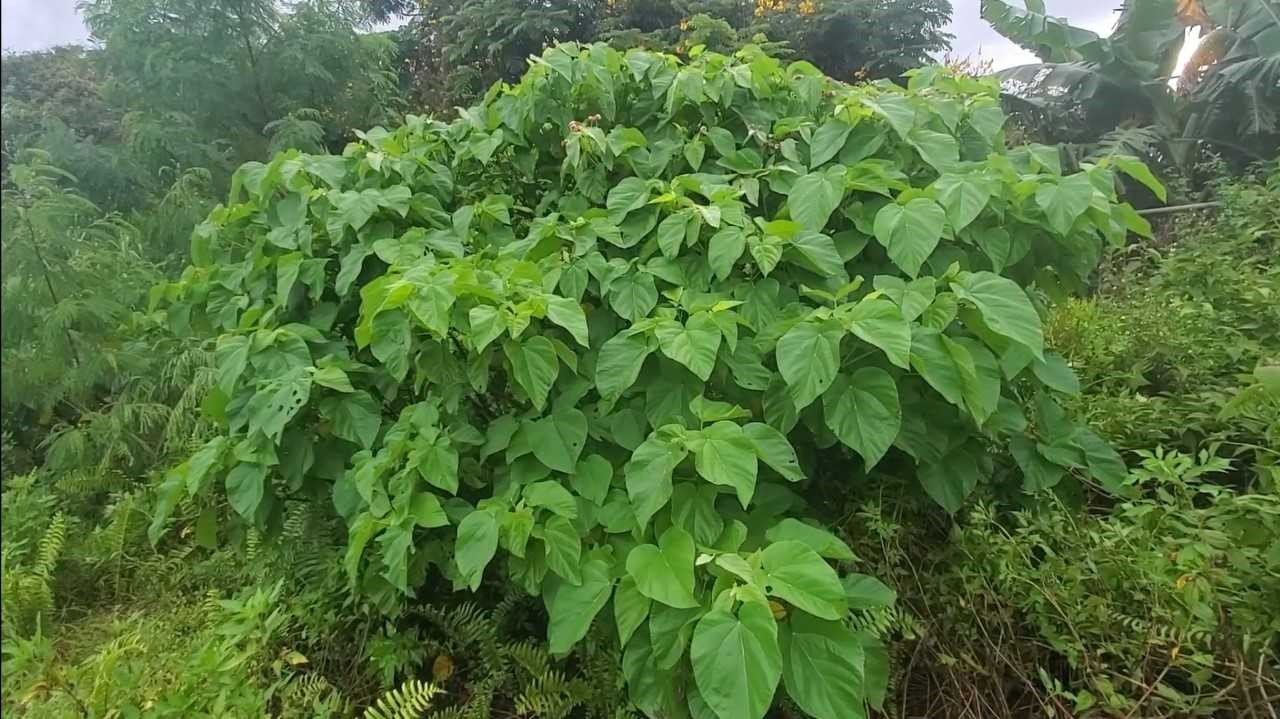
Melochia villosissima canopy. Dededo, Guam

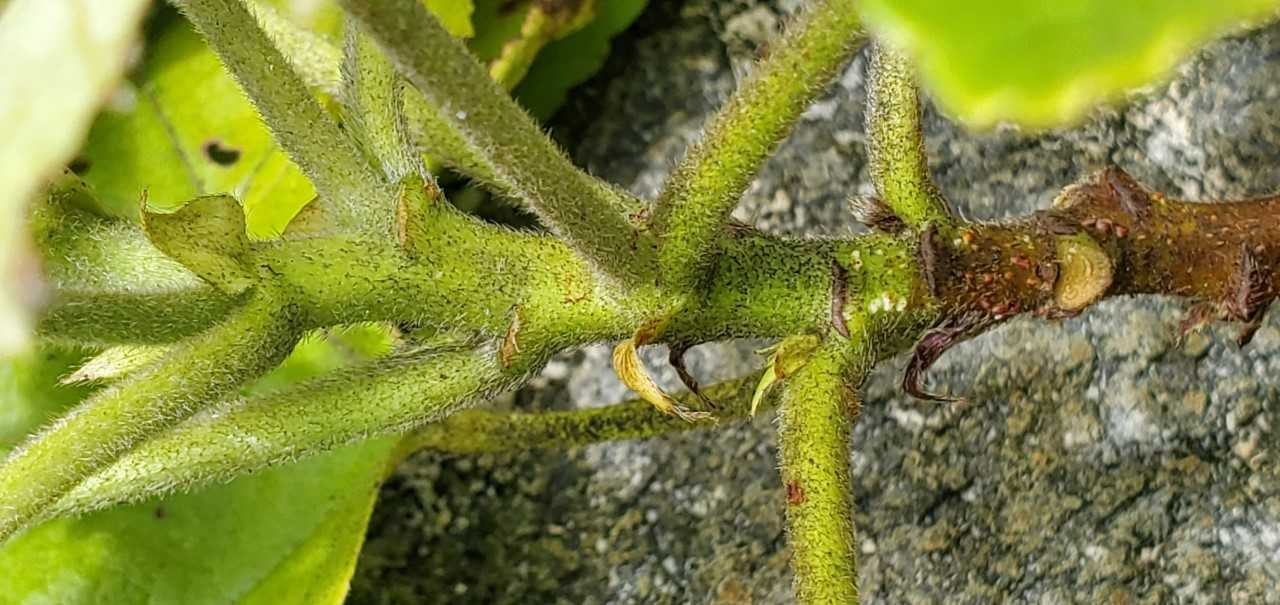
Hirsute stems. Dededo, Guam
