= Scaphopetalum =

Scientific classification
- Kingdom: Plantae
- Clade: Tracheophytes
- Clade: Angiosperms
- Clade: Eudicots
- Clade: Rosids
- Order: Malvales
- Family: Malvaceae
- Subfamily: Byttnerioideae
- Tribe: Byttnerieae
- Genus: Scaphopetalum; Mast.

Genus of plants

Scaphopetalum is a genus previously classified under the plant family Sterculiaceae. Currently, under the APG IV system the genus is placed under the subfamily Byttnerioideae of the family Malvaceae sensu lato. The distribution of the genus is restricted to the rain forests of Africa. In total 26 taxa have been described, 21 have been recognized (20 species and 1 variety), two invalid and one nomen nudus (without a formal description).

== History ==
The genus Scaphopetalum was first described by Masters (1867), based on material from Equatorial Guinee (Mt.John) collected by Gustav Mann. Three species were described by Maxwell T. Masters, S. longe-penduculatum, S. blackii and S. mannii. Later, É. De Wildeman and T. Durant (June, 1897) described S. thonneri based on material collected by F. Thonner from northern DRC. A few months later K. Schumann (October, 1897) described four new species, S. stipulosum, S. macranthum, S. zenkeri and S. monophysca. The last species, S. monophysca closely resembles S. thonerii and its description is based on material from Cameroon and Gabon.

The next six new species are a contribution of German taxonomists mainly based on material from Cameroon collected by Ledermann, Mildbraed and Zenker. In 1908 H.Winkler describes S. paxii. collected by himself in Cameroon. Engler and Krause described two species in 1911, S. pallidinervis and S. riparia and three in 1913, S. discolor, S. acuminatum and S. bruneo-purpureum. S. discolor is a species from Congo and the other four from Cameroon. That same year Baker f. described two species based on material collected by Talbot from Nigeria, S. parvifolium and S. talbotii.

The first species for West Africa was described by A. Chevalier in 1917 and named S. amoenum. For the Mayombe region (Gabon) two species were described by Pellegrine in 1921, S. letestui and S. ngounyense. The first species was made synonym by Halle in 1961 as a variety within S. blackii, S. blackii var. letestui. In the same publication N. Halle splits off another variety S. thonneri var. klainei. Both varieties were described without a prologue in Latin and subsequently invalid. In the same year R. Germain describes a new species S. vanderijstii and a new variety S. dewevrei var. suborophila both for DRC. The most recent species is described from Equatorial Guinea, S. obiangianum by M.E. Leal in 2007.

== Species ==
20 species are accepted.

- Scaphopetalum accuminatum Engl. & K.Krause
- Scaphopetalum amoeum A.Chev.
- Scaphopetalum blackii Mast.
- Scaphopetalum bruneopurpureum Engl. & K.Krause
- Scaphopetalum dewevrei De Wild. & T.Durand
- Scaphopetalum discolor Engl.& Krause
- Scaphopetalum longepedunculatum Mast.
- Scaphopetalum macranthum K.Schum.
- Scaphopetalum mannii Mast.
- Scaphopetalum ngouniense Pellegr.
- Scaphopetalum obiangianum M.E.Leal
- Scaphopetalum pallidinerve Engl. & K.Krause
- Scaphopetalum parvifolium Baker f.
- Scaphopetalum paxii H.J.P.Winkl.
- Scaphopetalum riparium Engl.& K.Krause
- Scaphopetalum stipulosum K.Schum.
- Scaphopetalum talbotii Baker f.
- Scaphopetalum thonneri De Wild.& T.Durand
- Scaphopetalum vanderystii Germ.
- Scaphopetalum zenkeri K.Schum.

== Bibliography ==
- Chevalier A. (1920) Explorations Botaniques de Afrique Occidental Francais i: 85
- De Wildeman & T. Durand (1897) Bulletin Societe Royal Botanique Belgique xxxix. 97
- Engler & K. Krause (1912) Botanisch Jahrbucher (sys) xlviii: 553
