= Gilesia =

Scientific classification
- Kingdom: Plantae
- Clade: Tracheophytes
- Clade: Angiosperms
- Clade: Eudicots
- Clade: Rosids
- Order: Malvales
- Family: Malvaceae
- Genus: Gilesia; F.Muell. (1875)
- Species: G. biniflora

Binomial name
- Gilesia biniflora F.Muell. (1875)

Synonyms
- Hymenocapsa J.M.Black (1925); Corchorus longipes Tate (1898); Hermannia gilesii F.Muell. (1875), pro syn.; Hymenocapsa longipes J.M.Black (1925); Mahernia gilesii F.Muell. (1875), nom. provis.

Genus of flowering plants

Gilesia biniflora is species of flowering plant belonging to the family Malvaceae. It is commonly known as the 'western tar-vine'. It is the sole species in genus Gilesia. It is in the Byttnerioideae subfamily.

Its native range is the deserts and dry shrublands of central Australia, including portions of New South Wales, Northern Territory, Queensland, South Australia, and Western Australia.

It is named in honour of Christopher Giles (c. 1840 – 1917), an English surveyor, and Ernest Giles (1835–1897) an Australian explorer. The specific Latin epithet of biniflora is derived from the Latin bīnus (“double, twofold”) and also 'flora' meaning plant. It was first described and published in Fragmenta Phytographiae Australiae (Fragm.) Vol.9 on page 42 in 1875.
