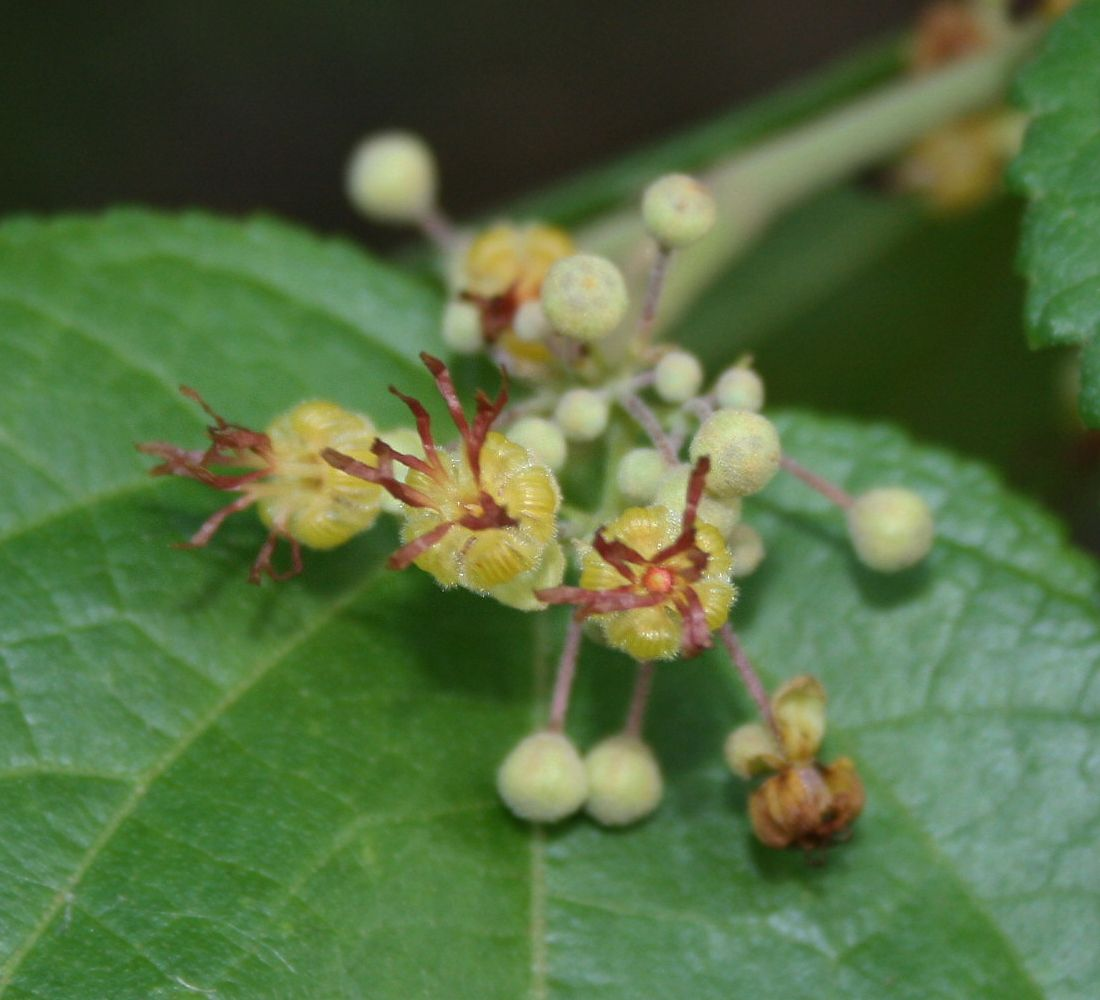
- Guazuma ulmifolia flower

Scientific classification
- Kingdom: Plantae
- Clade: Tracheophytes
- Clade: Angiosperms
- Clade: Eudicots
- Clade: Rosids
- Order: Malvales
- Family: Malvaceae
- Tribe: Theobromateae
- Genus: Guazuma; Mill.

Type species
- Guazuma ulmifolia Lam.

Synonyms
- Bubroma Schreb.; Diuroglossum Turcz.

= Guazuma =

Genus of plants

Guazuma is a genus of flowering plants in the family Malvaceae native Mexico and tropical America.

== Taxonomy ==
It was published by Philip Miller in 1754. The lectotype Guazuma ulmifolia Lam. was designated in 1967.

=== Species ===
It has four species:

- Guazuma crinita Mart.
- Guazuma invira (Willd.) G.Don
- Guazuma longipedicellata Freytag
- Guazuma ulmifolia Lam.
