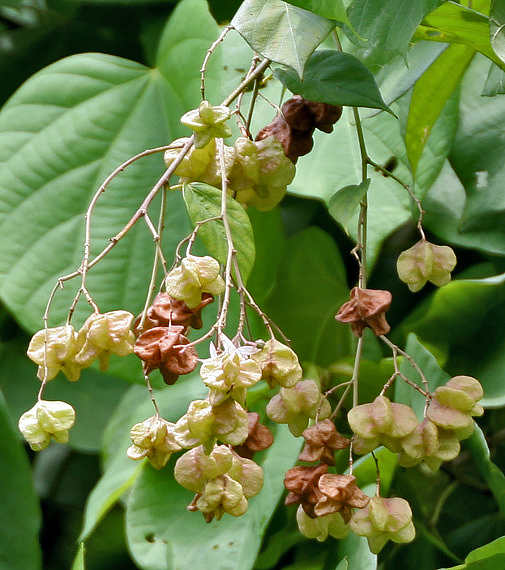
- Foliage and fruit in Kolkata, West Bengal, India

Conservation status
- Least Concern (IUCN 3.1)

Scientific classification
- Kingdom: Plantae
- Clade: Tracheophytes
- Clade: Angiosperms
- Clade: Eudicots
- Clade: Rosids
- Order: Malvales
- Family: Malvaceae
- Subfamily: Byttnerioideae
- Tribe: Byttnerieae
- Genus: Kleinhovia; L.
- Species: K. hospita

Binomial name
- Kleinhovia hospita L.

Synonyms
- See text

= Kleinhovia =

Genus of plants

Kleinhovia is a monotypic genus of plants in the cotton, hibiscus and cacao family Malvaceae. The sole species in the genus is Kleinhovia hospita, commonly known as guest tree, an evergreen tree native to Indonesia, Malaysia and other parts of tropical Asia and the Pacific.

== Description ==
Kleinhovia hospita is an evergreen, bushy tree growing up to 20 m (66 ft) high, with a dense rounded crown and upright pink sprays of flowers and fruits. Leaves are simple and staggered, with stipules that are sword-shaped, narrow, and about 8 mm (0.31 in) long. The petioles are up to 30 cm (12 in) long, and the leaf-blade is egg or heart-shaped, glabrous on both sides, and have a pointed apex. Secondary veins occur in 6–8 pairs, palmately nerved.

The flowers of K. hospita are situated at the end of the crowns, in loose panicles protruding from the crown. flowers are about 5 mm (0.20 in) wide, coloured pale pink. The pedicels are up to 10 mm (0.39 in) long. The bracteoles are lance-shaped, and 4 mm (0.16 in) long when pubescent. gynandrophores are about 6 mm (0.24 in) long and pubescent. There are 5 pink sepals which are thin and lance-shaped, and are about 7 mm (0.28 in) long with tomentose. It has 5 small petals, the upper one being yellow. It has 15 monadelphous stamens, which get up to 15 mm (0.59 in) long. The staminal tube is broadly campanulate, ususually fused to the gynandrophore. It is 5-lobed, each lobe having 3 anthers and alternating with staminodes. The anthers lack stalks and face outwards. pistil occur with a 5-celled, pilose ovary, one style and a capitate, with a 5-lobed stigma. K. hospita flowers throughout the year.

Fruit production starts early, often in the third year after planting. The fruit of K. hospita are rounded, 5-lobed, thin-walled, membranous capsules 2.5 cm (0.98 in) in diameter that rupture along the dorsal suture, with each locule having 1–2 seeds. The seeds are spherical, whitish, warty and lack endosperms at maturity. The fruits are more conspicuous than the flowers due to their abundance and size.

== Range ==
Kleinhovia's range includes Bangladesh, Christmas Island, Peninsular Malaysia, Vietnam, Hainan, Taiwan, the Ryukyu Islands, Caroline Islands, Lesser Sunda Islands, Solomon Islands, Vanuatu, Fiji, Tonga, Samoan Islands, and Society Islands.

It has been introduced to the Comoro Islands, Pakistan, Puerto Rico, Sri Lanka, Thailand, Trinidad and Tobago, and the Windward Islands.

== Uses ==
Kleinhovia hospita has been used as a traditional medicine to treat scabies in parts of Indonesia, Peninsular Malaysia, and Papua New Guinea. The bark and leaves has been used as a hair wash for lice, while the juice of the leaves can be used as an eyewash. Young leaves are eaten as a vegetable. Bast fibres are used for making ropes used for tying or for tethering livestock.

The wood of K. hospita shows a pinkish buff and is moderately fine in texture, soft, light, easy to season, work and finish. Its energy value is about 19000 kJ/kg. The leaves and bark contain cyanogenic compounds that are assumed to help to kill ectoparasites such as lice. Extracts of the leaves have shown anti-tumour activity against sarcoma in mice. A number of fatty acids with a cyclopropenylic ring (scopoletin, kaempferol, and quercetin) have been isolated from the leaves.

Kleinhovia hospita is used for ornamental purposes: the attractiveness of the pink panicles accounts for its spread as an ornamental.

The tree bark of Kleinhovia hospita has a good potential as a reinforcement for Fiber Reinforced Composite because of its high mechanical strength.

== Gallery ==
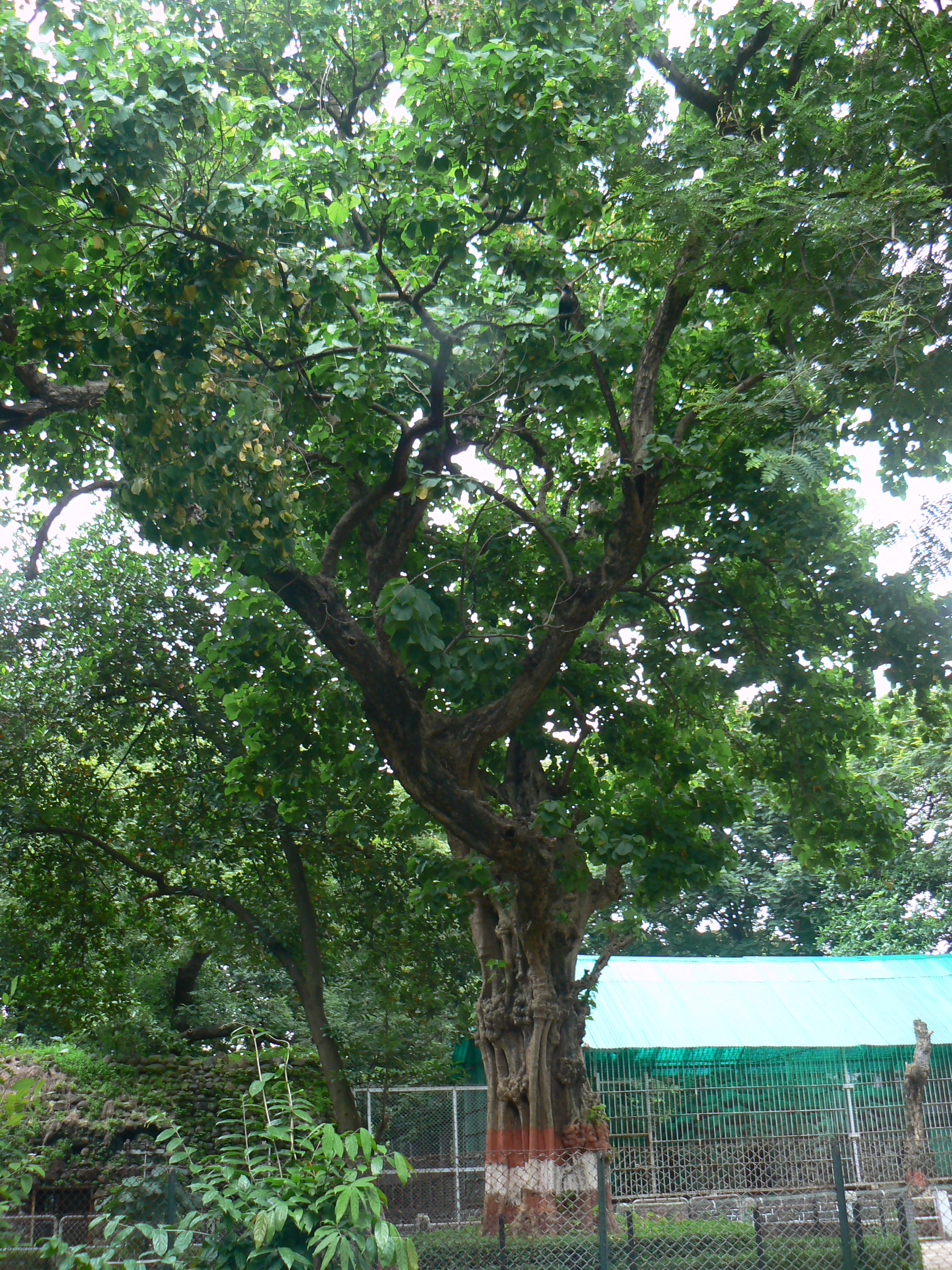
Mature tree

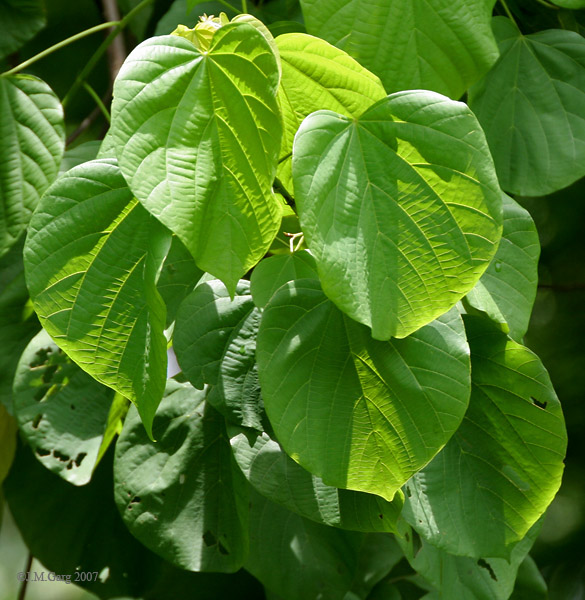
Foliage

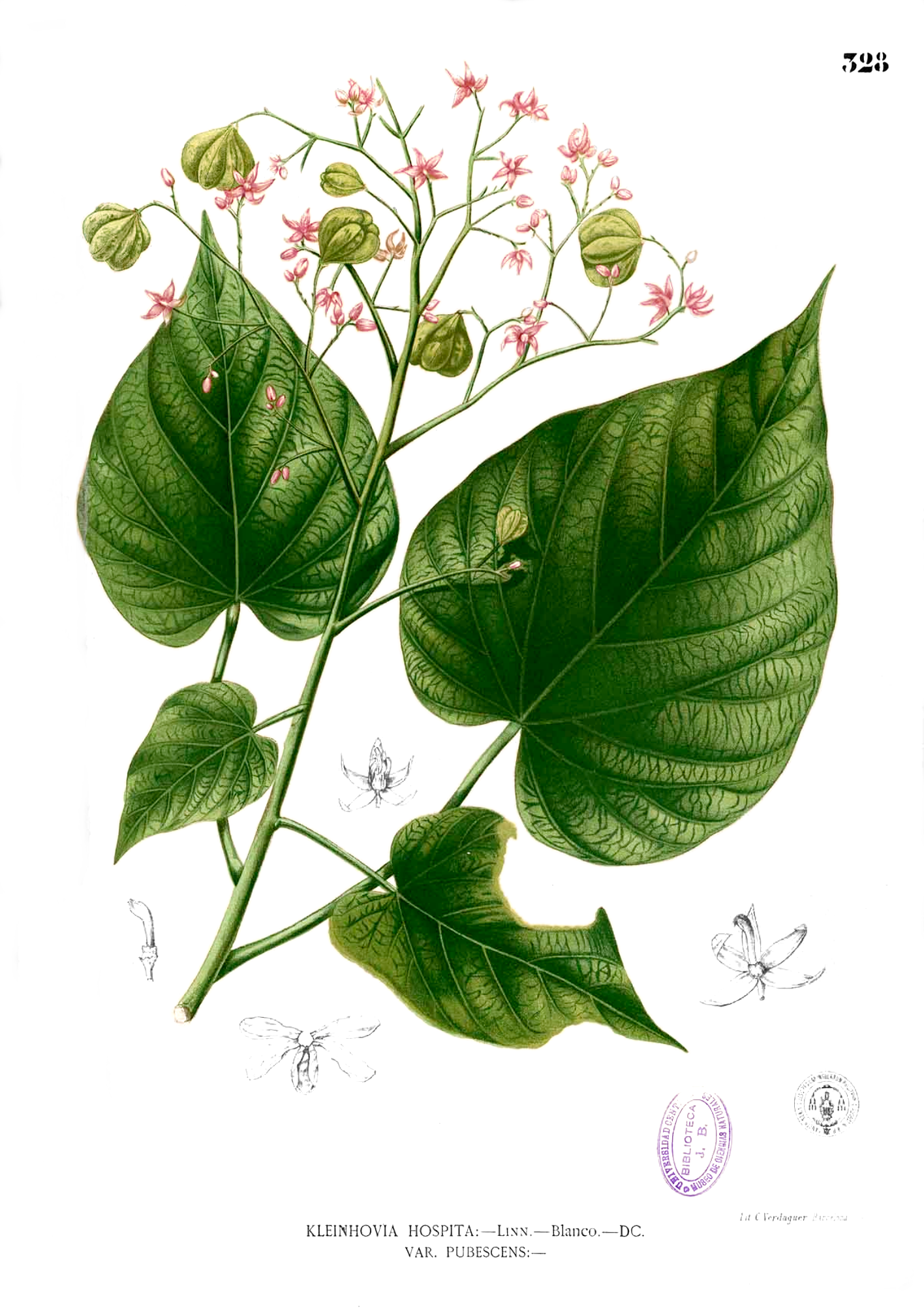
Colour plate by Francisco Manuel Blanco

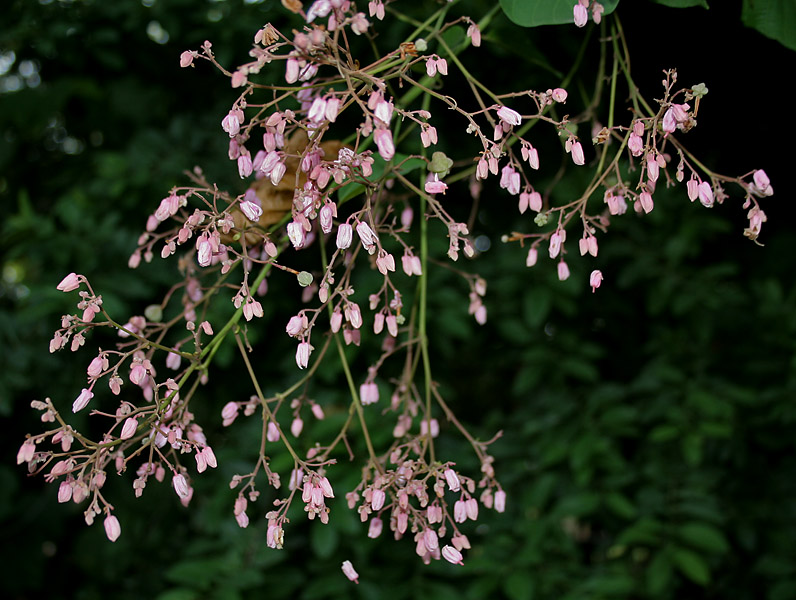
Budding inflorescence

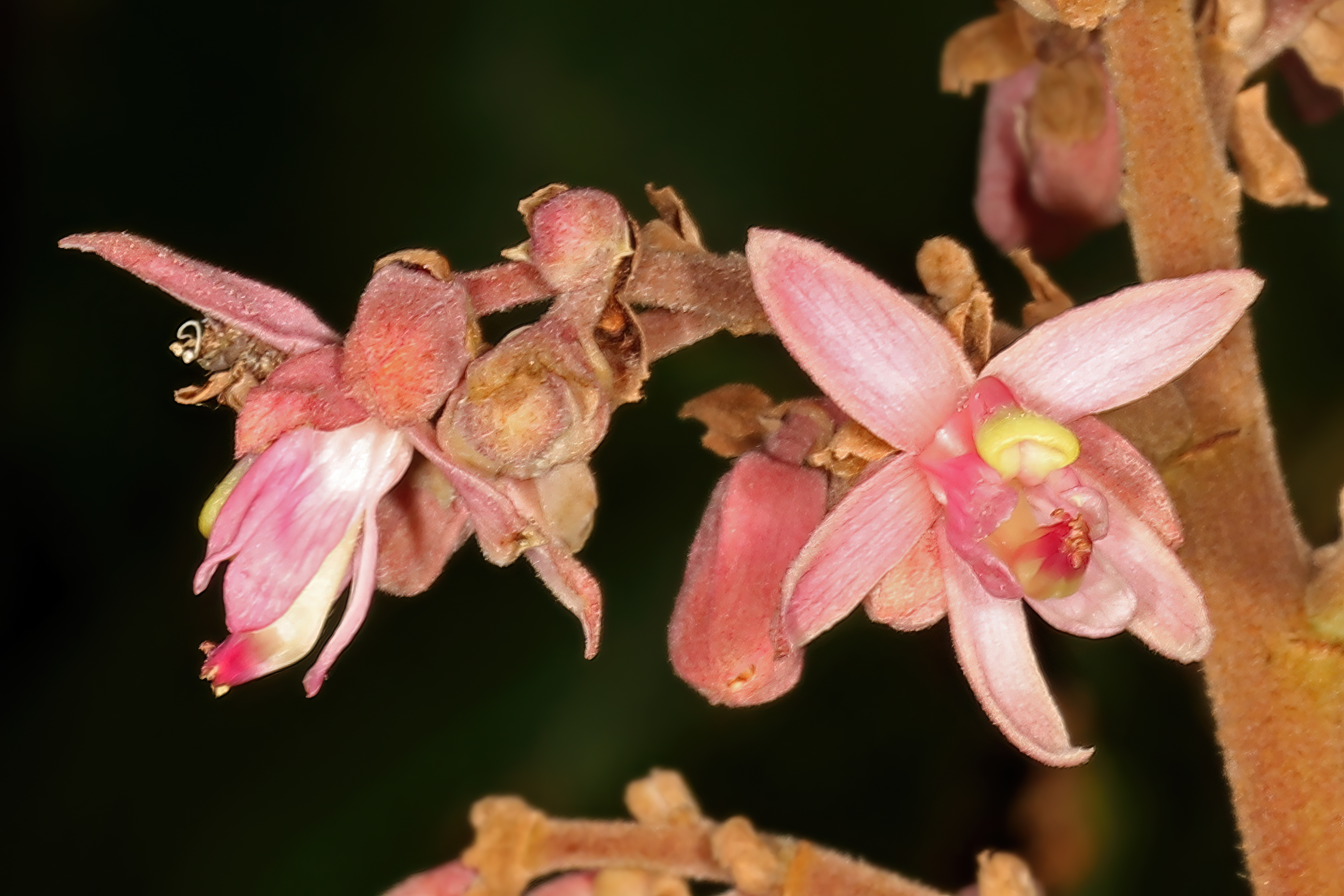
Close up of flowers

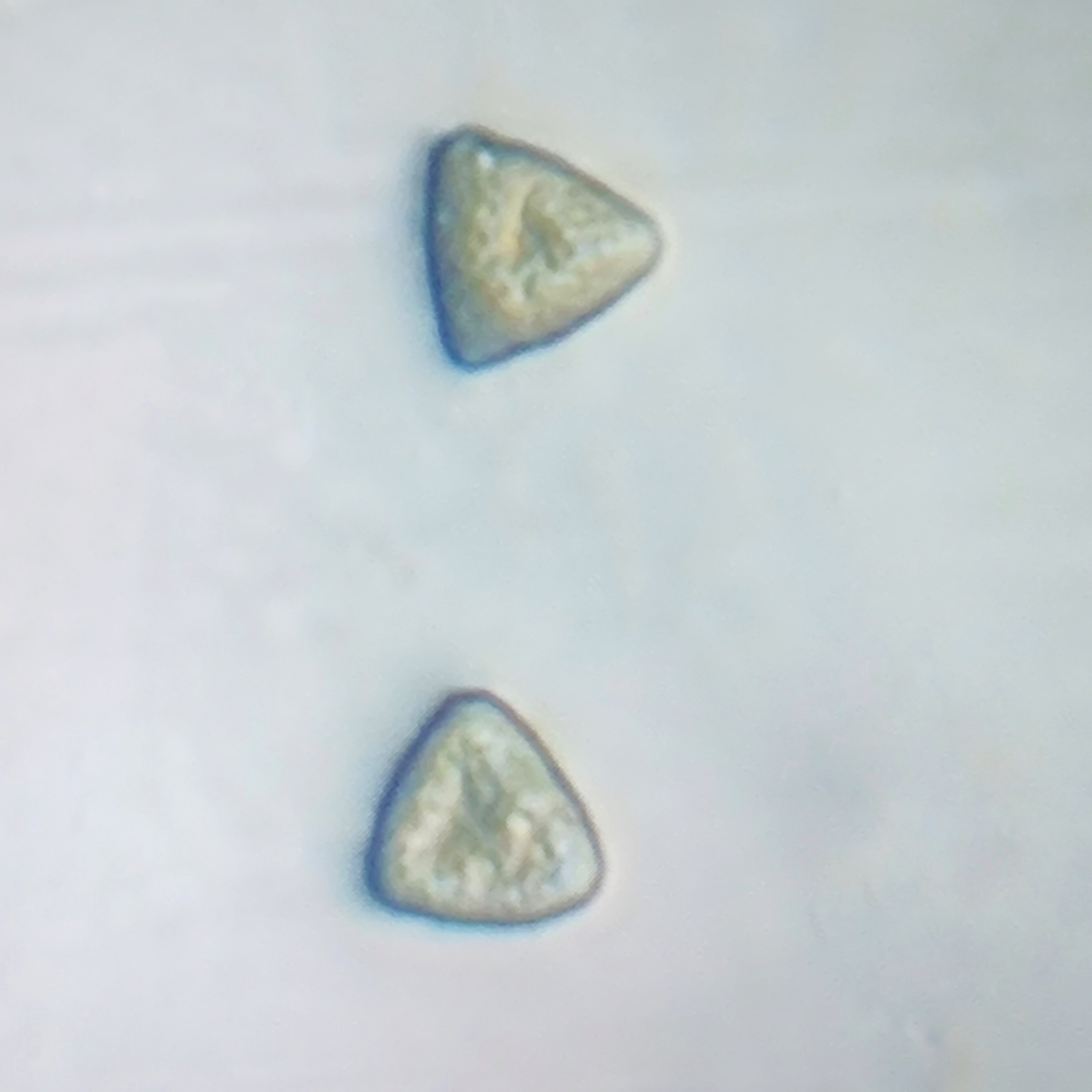
Pollen grains

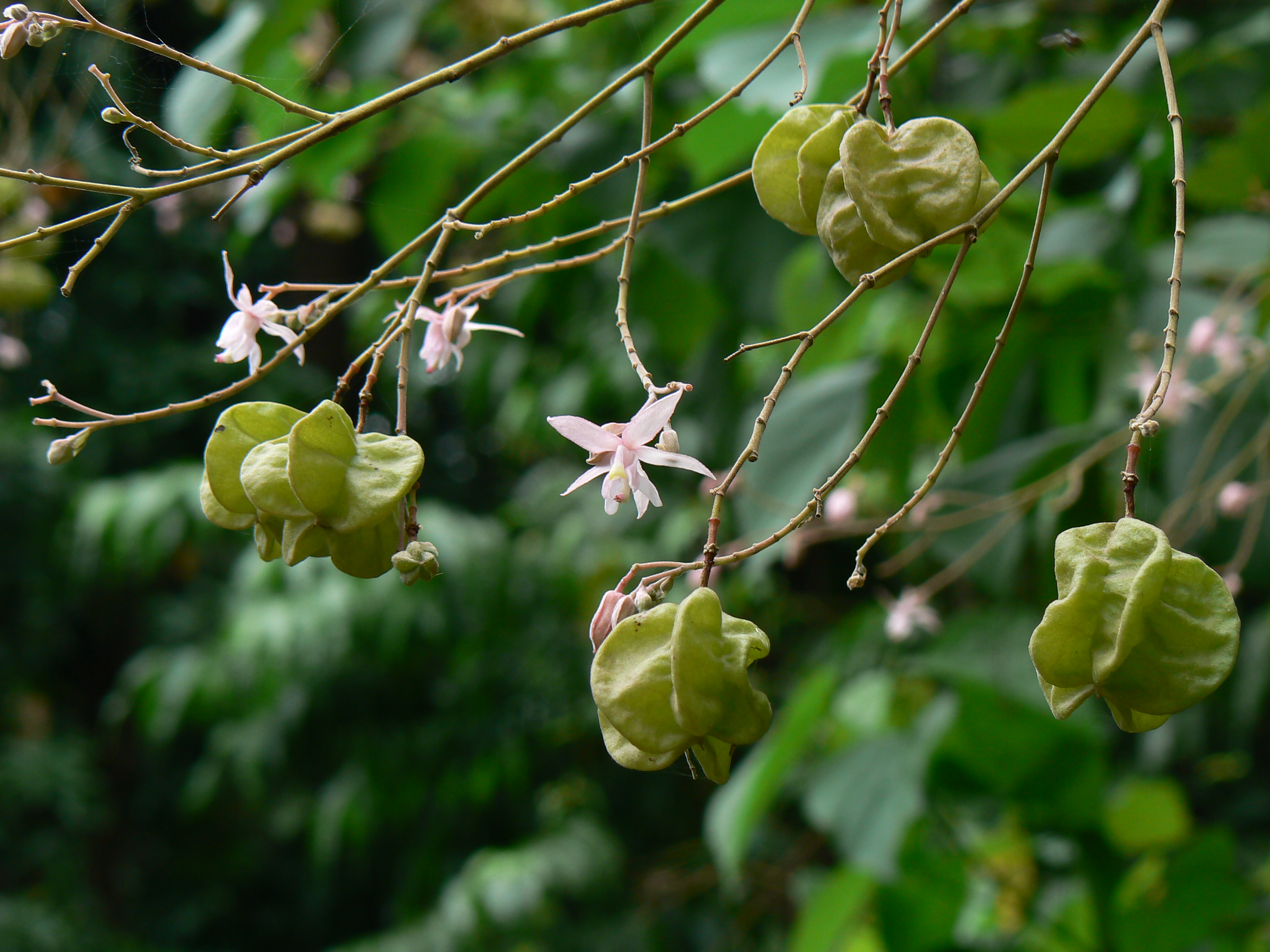
Flowers and fruit
