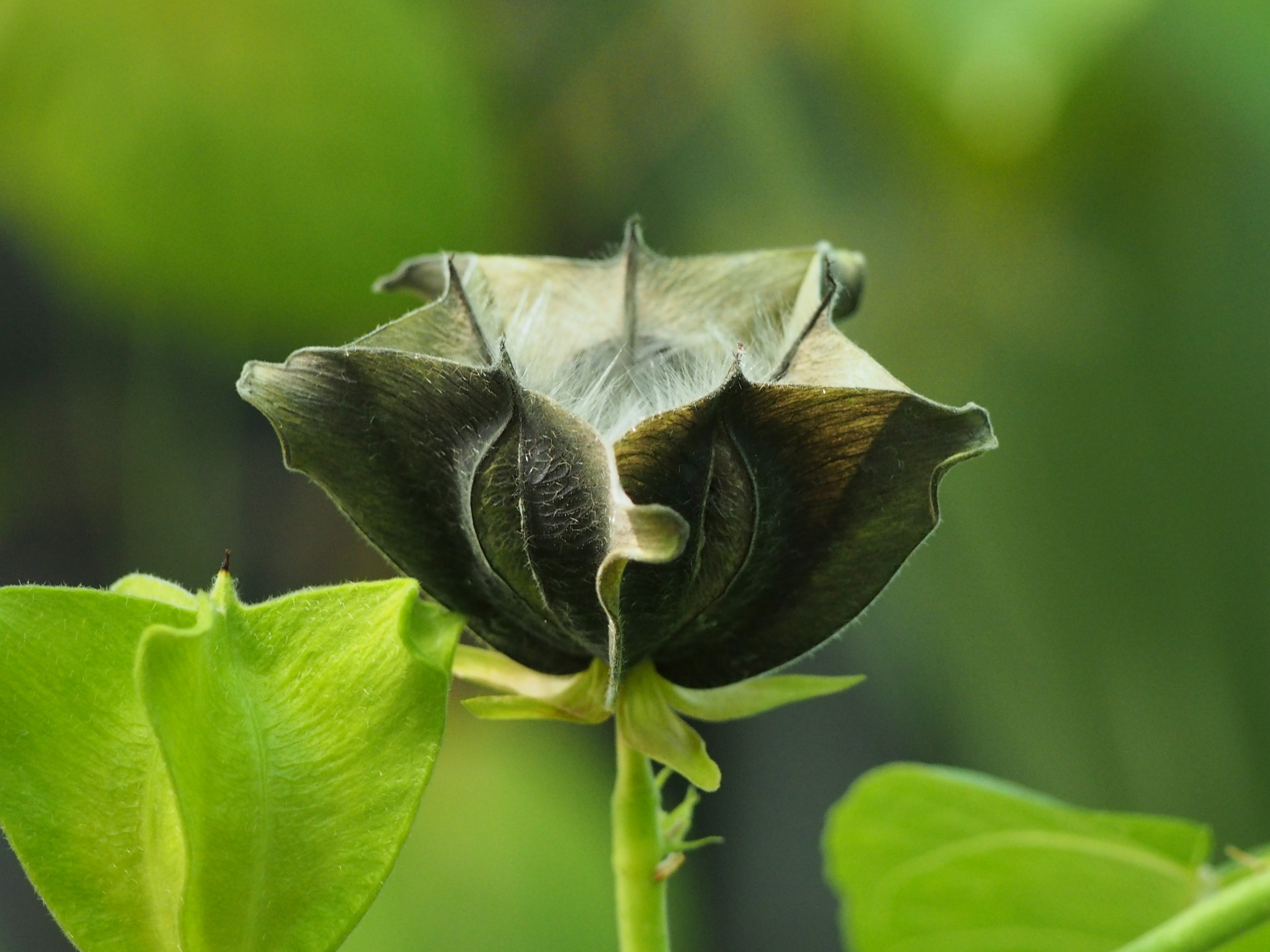
- Abroma augustum

Scientific classification
- Kingdom: Plantae
- Clade: Tracheophytes
- Clade: Angiosperms
- Clade: Eudicots
- Clade: Rosids
- Order: Malvales
- Family: Malvaceae
- Tribe: Byttnerieae
- Genus: Abroma; Jacq.
- Species: A. augustum

Binomial name
- Abroma augustum (L.) L.f.

Synonyms
- Ambroma L.f., orth. var.; Abroma alatum Blanco; Abroma angulatum Lam.; Abroma angulosum Poir.; Abroma commune Blanco; Abroma denticulatum Miq.; Abroma elongatum Lam.; Abroma fastuosum Jacq.; Abroma javanicum Miq.; Abroma molle DC.; Abroma obliquum C.Presl; Abroma sinuosum G.Nicholson; Abroma wheleri Retz.; Theobroma augustum L. (basionym)

= Abroma =

Genus of flowering plants

Abroma is a genus of flowering plants in the family Malvaceae. It includes a single species, Abroma augustum, sometimes written Abroma augusta, and commonly known as devil's cotton. It is a shrub or tree native to tropical Asia, ranging from the Himalayas and southern China through Indochina and Malesia to New Guinea and the Solomon Islands.

Abroma augustum has dark red flowers with a characteristic and unusual appearance. The leaves and stems are covered with soft bristly hairs that are very irritating to the touch. The bark yields a jute-like fiber. It is used as a traditional medicinal plant.

== Taxonomy ==
The species was first described as Theobroma augustum (or Theobroma augusta) by Carl Linnaeus in 1768.

The genus was described by Nikolaus Joseph von Jacquin in 1776 with a single species Abroma fastuosum, which was illustrated and described. However, because Jacquin was renaming Theobroma augusta L., according to the International Code of Nomenclature for algae, fungi, and plants, he was required to use the name Abroma augustum, and A. fastuosum is an illegitimate name. The correct name of the type species, A. augustum (L.) L. f., was made in 1782 by Carl Linnaeus the Younger. Ambroma is an orthographic variant.

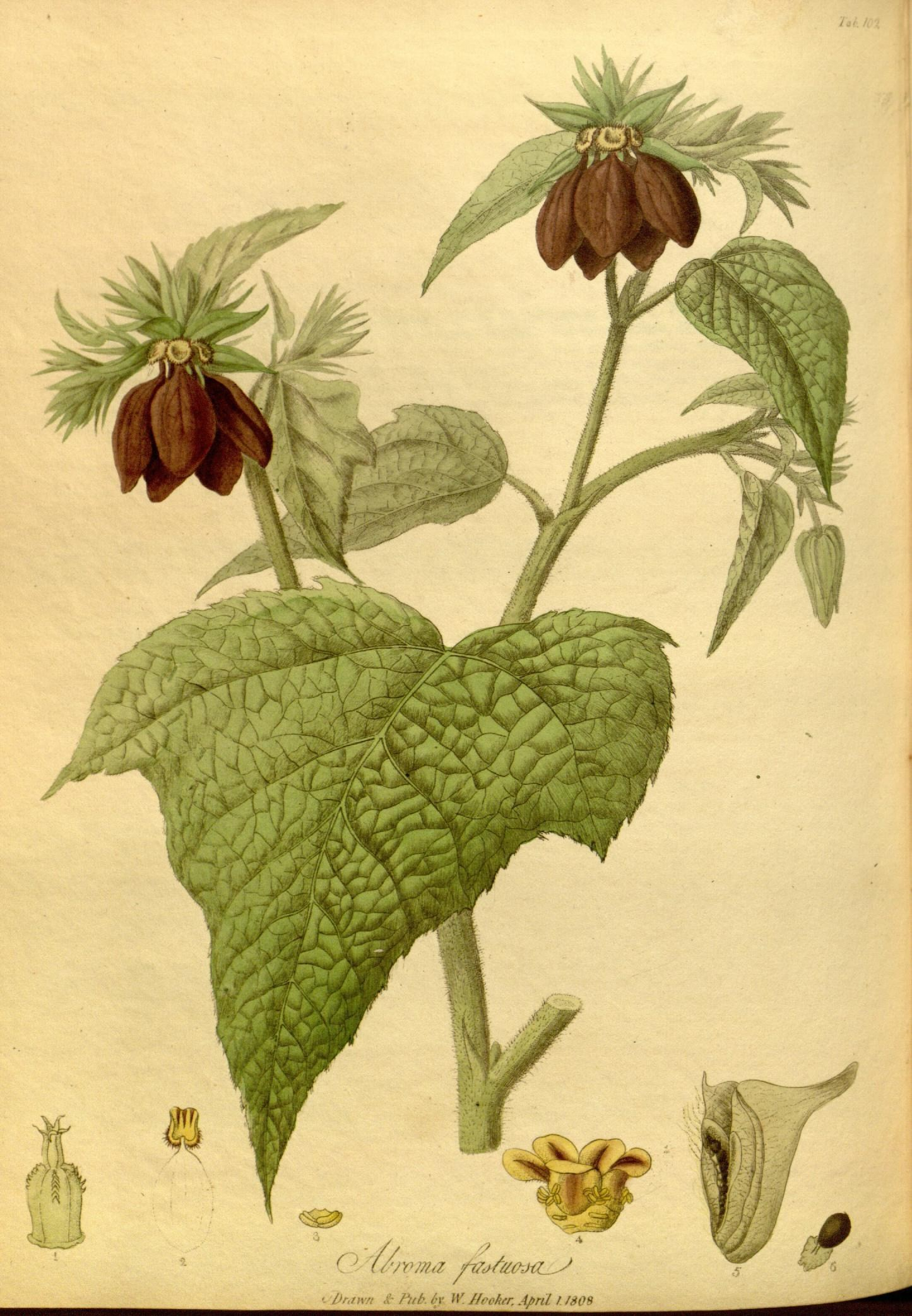

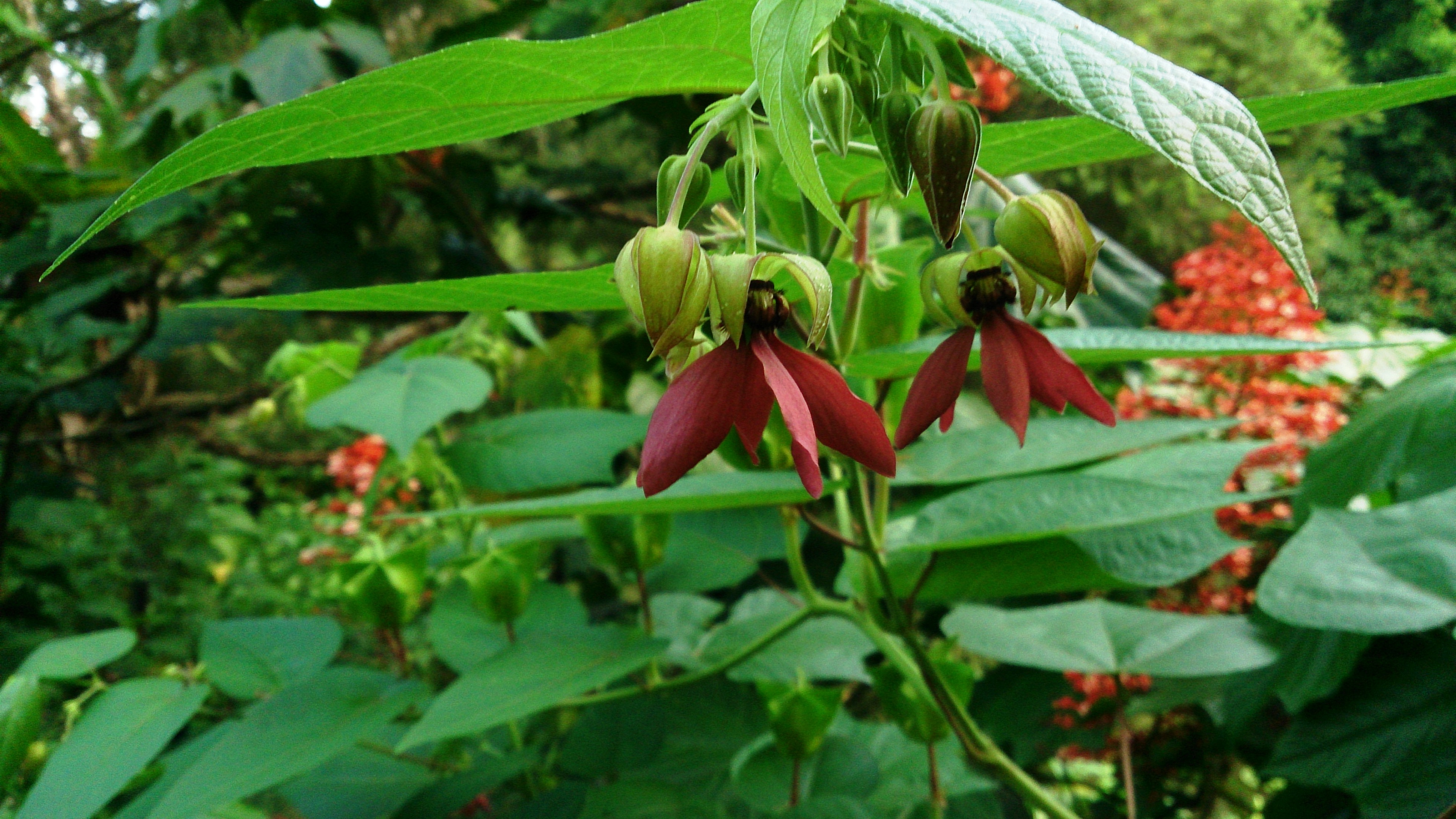

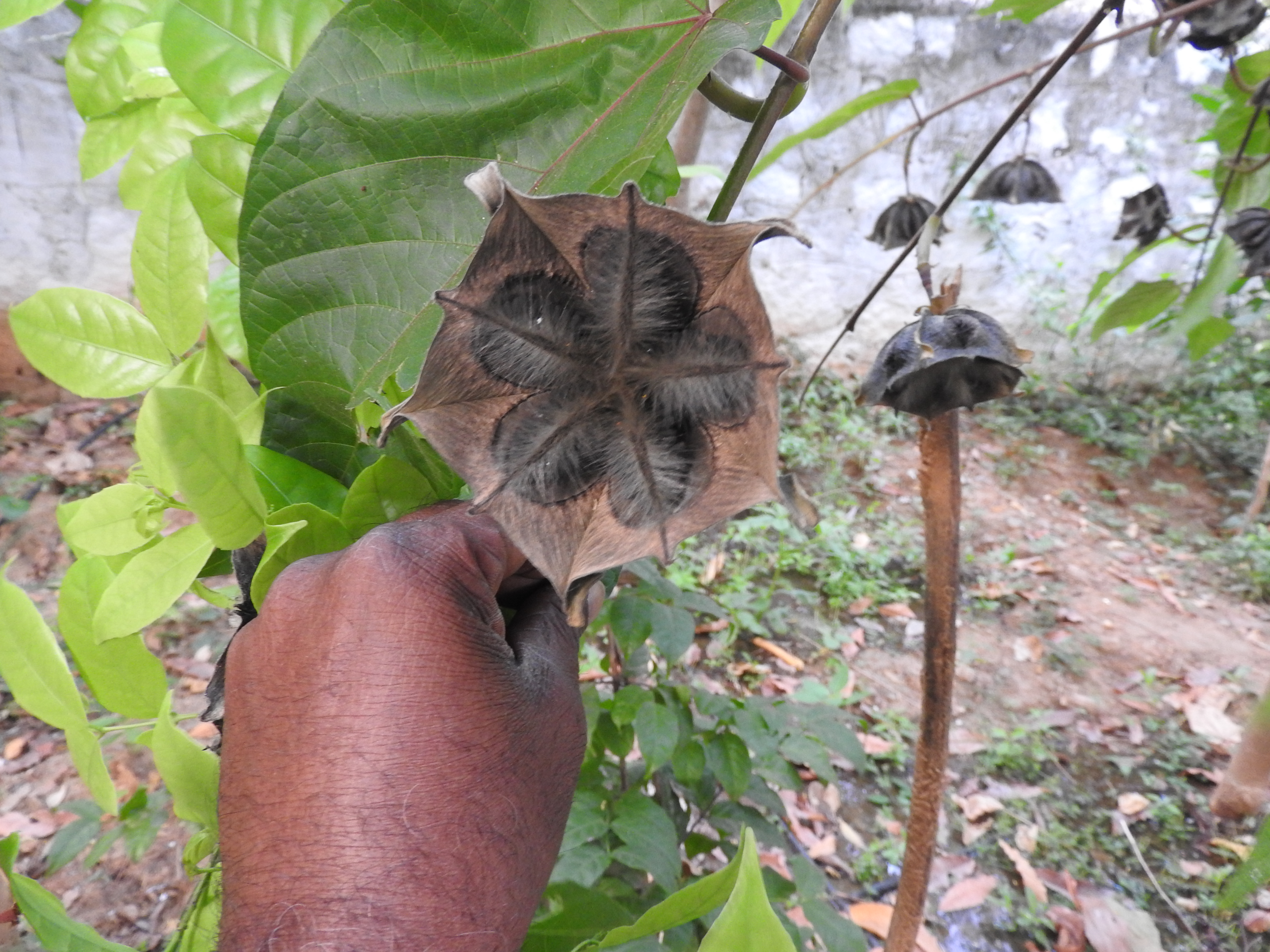
mature fruit

== Cultivation ==
In the greenhouse, plants bloom from late spring to early summer. Dark maroon flowers are formed in terminal panicles. Individual flowers are up to 3 inches (7.5 cm) across.

Abroma augustum is propagated from seed. Seed germinate in 21–30 days at 72 °F (24 °C).
