= Glossostemon =

Scientific classification
- Kingdom: Plantae
- Clade: Tracheophytes
- Clade: Angiosperms
- Clade: Eudicots
- Clade: Rosids
- Order: Malvales
- Family: Malvaceae
- Genus: Glossostemon; Desf.
- Species: G. bruguieri

Binomial name
- Glossostemon bruguieri Desf.

Synonyms
- Dombeya arabica Baker

Species of flowering plant

Glossostemon is a genus of flowering plants in the family Malvaceae. It includes a single species, Glossostemon bruguieri, synonym Dombeya arabica, a shrub with thick long tapering dark colored roots with 70–100 cm in length and 5–8 cm in breadth. It is native to Yemen, Iran, Iraq, Egypt, Saudi Arabia, Turkey and Morocco. The dried peeled roots of G. bruguieri are called "mughat" in Egypt and Arab countries (Arabic: مُغات mughāt). The roots are commonly used in traditional medicine for many nutritional and medicinal values.

== Chemical composition ==
Starch is the main component of the dried peeled roots with 54.5–62.4% (differs according to the climatic region of cultivation) while protein represents 4.5–8.3%, half of which is aspartic acid. Roots contain high amounts of non-starch polysaccharides including dietary fibers, pectin and up to 27% of mucilage.

Calcium, magnesium and iron are the main minerals of the roots. Minor amounts of zinc, manganese and copper have also been found. Tatakin (4-methoxyisoscutellargin), takakin 8-O-glucoside, takakin 7-O-glucoside, sesamin, chrysophanol, emodin, parietin, bucegin 7-O-glucoside, isoscutellarein, isoscutellarein 7-O-glucoside, methoxsalen, aesculetin, estrone, scopoletin, phytosterols (a mixture of β-sitosterol, stigmasterol and campesterol) and α-amyrin were extracted from G. bruguieri. The so-called moghatin is a biflavone that has been uniquely discovered in moghat.

Seeds contain around 19.5% protein, 5.0% mucilage, arabinose (1.8%) and glucuronic acid (14.6%).

Both roots and seeds contain rhamnose, xylose, mannose and galacturonic acid.

== Use ==
In traditional medicine, hot drinks prepared from dried peeled root powder are used after delivery as a galactagogue. It is used as well for increasing body weight, as a demulcent agent and for relief of gout pain.

== Health and biological effect ==
Water extract of G. bruguieri roots has reversed induced juvenile osteopenia in Sprague Dawley rats. However, human clinical trials are yet to be done.

The unsaponifiable part of the plant leaves was reported to have stronger acaricidal activity on both the adult and egg stages of Tetranychus urticae than other botanical parts of the plant.

== Others ==
The Italian pharmacist Antonio Bey Figari has mentioned G. bruguieri in his 1864 book entitled "Studii scientifici sull'Egitto e sue adiacenze, compresa la penisola dell'Arabia Petrea-Scientific study in Egypt and its surroundings, including the peninsula of Arabia Petraea." He mentioned that the plant was coming from Persia to Egypt through the route of Damascus and was prescribed for cachectic patients, tuberculosis, chest diseases, tabes of children and cases of constitutional syphilis. He thought that Moghat was the main ingredient of the preparation "Revalenta arabica", that was being sold in Europe in the 18th century, but his idea was wrong because it was discovered later that the main ingredient of "Revalenta arabica" was merely lentil flour. He stated as well that he himself has observed wonderful results using the plant.
