= Dicarpidium =

Scientific classification
- Kingdom: Plantae
- Clade: Tracheophytes
- Clade: Angiosperms
- Clade: Eudicots
- Clade: Rosids
- Order: Malvales
- Family: Malvaceae
- Genus: Dicarpidium; F.Muell. (1857)
- Species: D. monoicum

Binomial name
- Dicarpidium monoicum F.Muell. (1857)

Synonyms
- Melochia monoica (F.Muell.) Baill. (1872)

Genus of plants

Dicarpidium monoicum is a species of flowering plant belonging to the family Malvaceae. It is the sole species in genus Dicarpidium. It is a subshrub or shrub native to northern Western Australia.
