= Leptonychia =

Scientific classification
- Kingdom: Plantae
- Clade: Tracheophytes
- Clade: Angiosperms
- Clade: Eudicots
- Clade: Rosids
- Order: Malvales
- Family: Malvaceae
- Genus: Leptonychia; Turcz.

Synonyms
- Binnendijkia Kurz (1865); Leptonychiopsis Ridl. (1920); Paragrewia Gagnep. ex R.S.Rao (1953)

Genus of plants

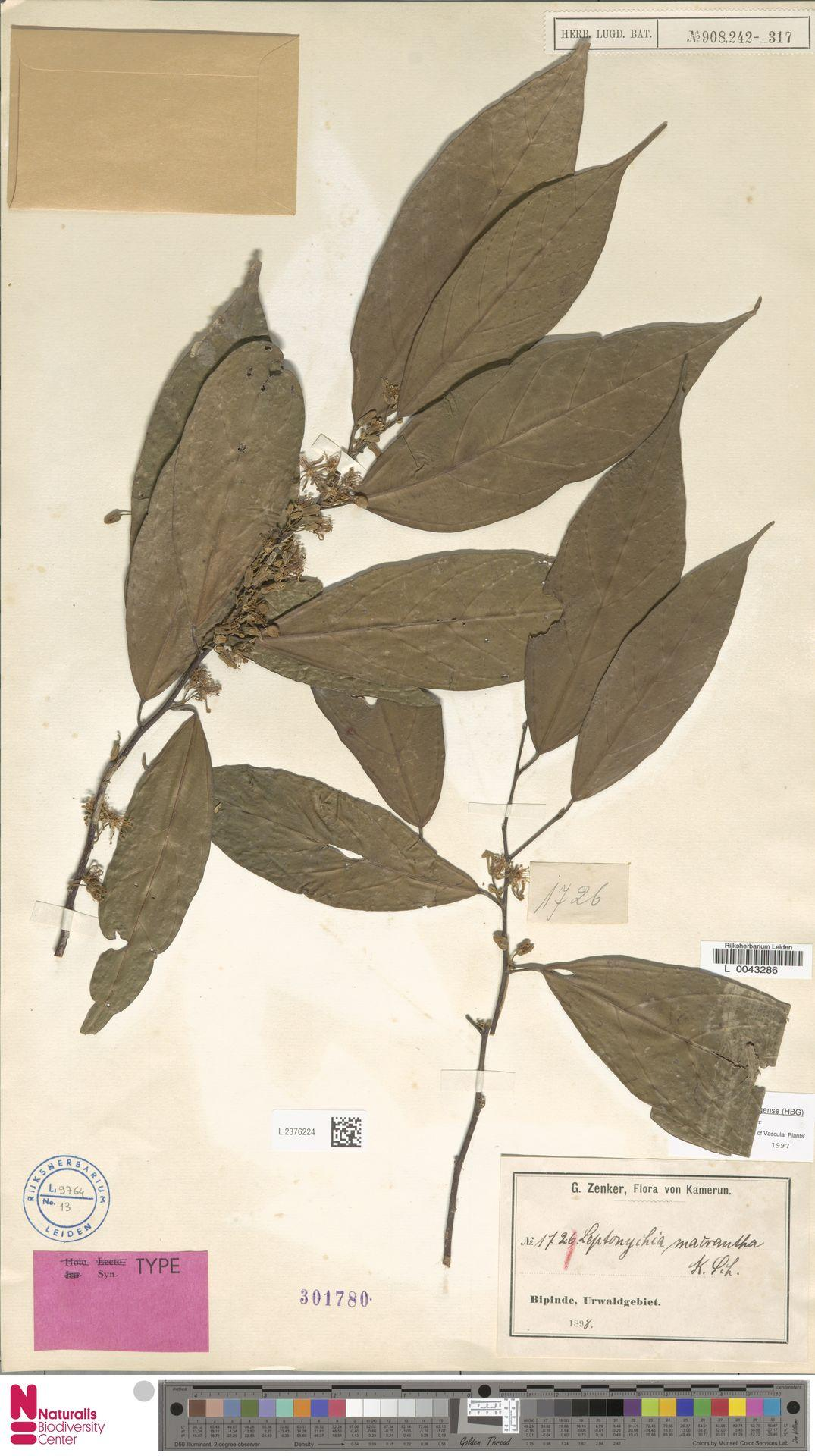
Leptonychia

Leptonychia is a genus of flowering plants belonging to the family Malvaceae.

Its native range is Tropical Africa (Sierra Leone to Kenya, Malawi, and Angola), Indo-China (Myanmar, Thailand, and Vietnam), western and central Malesia (Peninsular Malaysia, Sumatra, Borneo, and Philippines), and New Guinea.

== Species ==
38 species are currently accepted:

- Leptonychia adolfi-friederici Engl. & K.Krause
- Leptonychia bampsii Germ.
- Leptonychia banahaensis (Elmer) Merr.
- Leptonychia batangensis (C.H.Wright) Burret
- Leptonychia brieyi Germ.
- Leptonychia caudata (Wall. ex G.Don) Burret
- Leptonychia chrysocarpa K.Schum.
- Leptonychia densivenia Engl. & K.Krause
- Leptonychia devillei Germ.
- Leptonychia dewildei Germ.
- Leptonychia echinocarpa K.Schum.
- Leptonychia kamerunensis Engl. & K.Krause
- Leptonychia lanceolata Mast.
- Leptonychia lasiogyne K.Schum.
- Leptonychia ledermannii Engl.
- Leptonychia lokundjensis Engl. & K.Krause
- Leptonychia longicuspidata Engl. & K.Krause
- Leptonychia macrantha K.Schum.
- Leptonychia mayumbensis Germ.
- Leptonychia melanocarpa Germ.
- Leptonychia mildbraedii Engl.
- Leptonychia molundensis Engl. & K.Krause
- Leptonychia moyesiae Cheek
- Leptonychia multiflora K.Schum.
- Leptonychia occidentalis Keay
- Leptonychia pallida K.Schum.
- Leptonychia pallidiflora Engl. & K.Krause
- Leptonychia parviflora (Ridl.) Veldkamp & Flipphi
- Leptonychia pubescens Keay
- Leptonychia semlikensis Engl.
- Leptonychia subtomentosa K.Schum.
- Leptonychia tenuipes Engl. & K.Krause
- Leptonychia tessmannii Engl.
- Leptonychia tokana Germ.
- Leptonychia urophylla Welw. ex Mast.
- Leptonychia usambarensis K.Schum.
- Leptonychia wagemansii Germ.
- Leptonychia youngii Exell & Mendonça
