= Megatritheca =

Scientific classification
- Kingdom: Plantae
- Clade: Tracheophytes
- Clade: Angiosperms
- Clade: Eudicots
- Clade: Rosids
- Order: Malvales
- Family: Malvaceae
- Genus: Megatritheca; Cristóbal (1965)

Genus of plants

Megatritheca is a genus of flowering plants belonging to the family Malvaceae.

Its native range is West-Central Tropical Africa.

== Species ==
Species:

- Megatritheca devredii (Germ.) Cristóbal
- Megatritheca grossedenticulata (M.Bodard & Pellegr.) Cristóbal
