= Grey white-eye =

Grey white-eye may refer to:

- Grey-brown white-eye, Zosterops cinereus of Micronesia
- Réunion grey white-eye, Zosterops borbonicus
- Mauritius grey white-eye, Zosterops mauritianus
