= Mesalges hirsutus =

Scientific classification
- Domain: Eukaryota
- Kingdom: Animalia
- Phylum: Arthropoda
- Subphylum: Chelicerata
- Class: Arachnida
- Order: Sarcoptiformes
- Family: Psoroptoididae
- Genus: Mesalges
- Species: M. hirsutus

Binomial name
- Mesalges hirsutus Trouessart, 1899

Species of mite

Mesalges hirsutus is an acarid feather mite. It is a parasite of birds including several parrot species and the Mascarene martin of Madagascar.
