= Plaine des Chicots – Plaine d'Affouches Important Bird Area =

Coordinates: 20°58′S 55°27′E

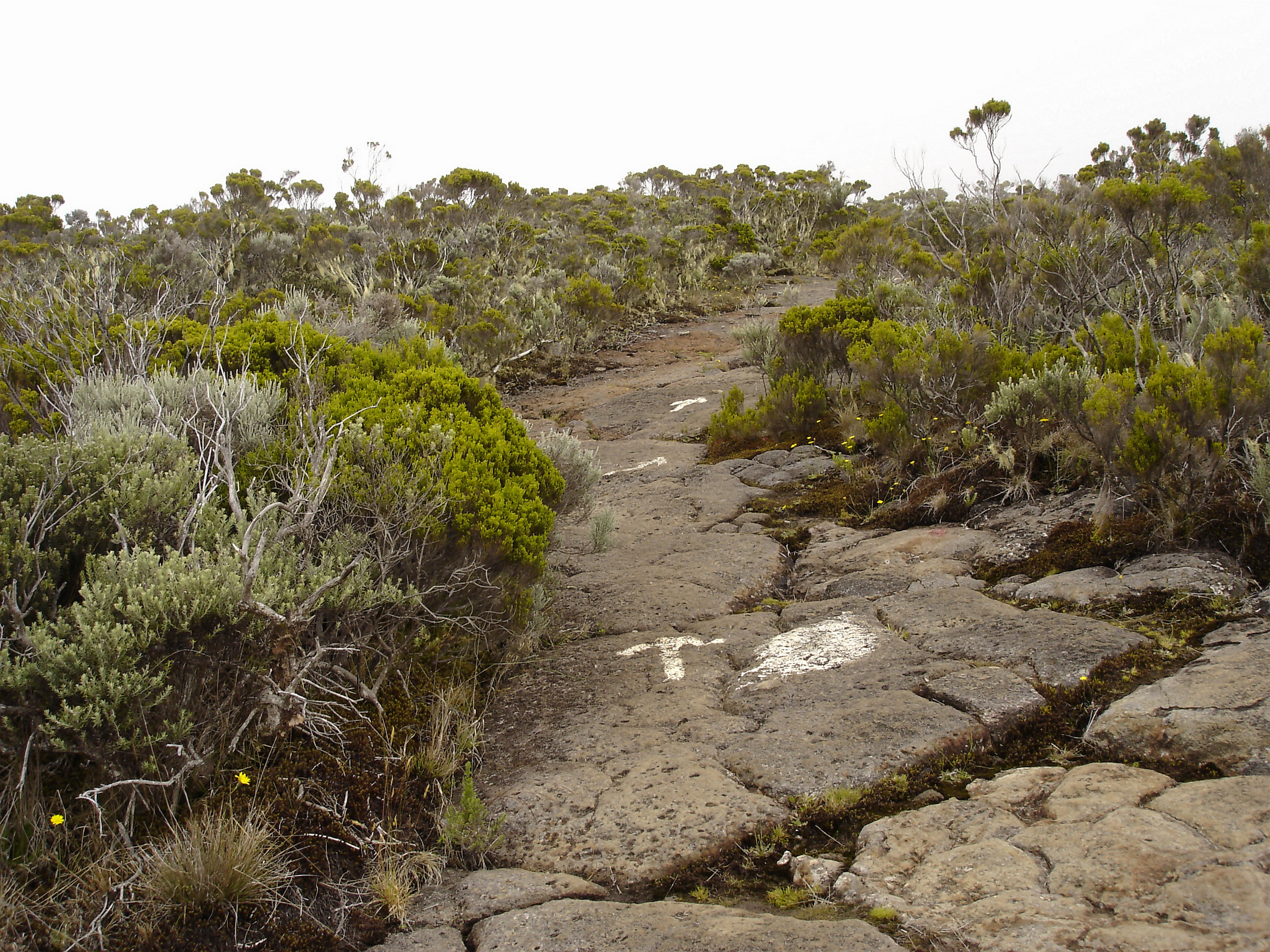
Alpine shrubland on the walking track to Roche Ecrite in the upper part of the IBA

Plaine des Chicots – Plaine d'Affouches Important Bird Area is a 3688 ha tract of land on the island of Réunion, a French territory in the western Indian Ocean.

== Description ==
The IBA comprises a sloping plain extending northwards and downwards from the northern rim of the Mafate caldera, at an elevation of 2277 m on the summit of Roche Ecrite, towards Saint-Denis, the coastal capital of the island territory. The plain is divided by the gorge of the Saint-Denis River into the Plaine d’Affouches in the west and the Plaine des Chicots in the east. The higher part of the site is dominated by native alpine shrubland communities, from 1600 m to 1500 m by endemic Acacia heterophylla forest, and then native mixed mountain forest down to about 1000 m above sea level. Although the site is now a nature reserve, in the past it was stocked with Javan rusa deer for hunting. There is a popular walking track from Saint-Denis to Roche Ecrite across the Plaine des Chicots. The lowest part of the site abuts Cryptomeria plantations.

=== Birds ===
The site has been identified by BirdLife International as an Important Bird Area (IBA) because it supports a breeding colony of tropical shearwaters (300 breeding pairs) as well as populations of Mascarene swiftlets, Réunion cuckooshrikes, Mascarene paradise flycatchers, Réunion bulbuls, Mascarene white-eyes, Réunion olive white-eyes, and Réunion stonechats.
