= Église Notre-Dame-de-la-Délivrance =

Church in Réunion, France

Coordinates: 20°52′47″S 55°26′36″E

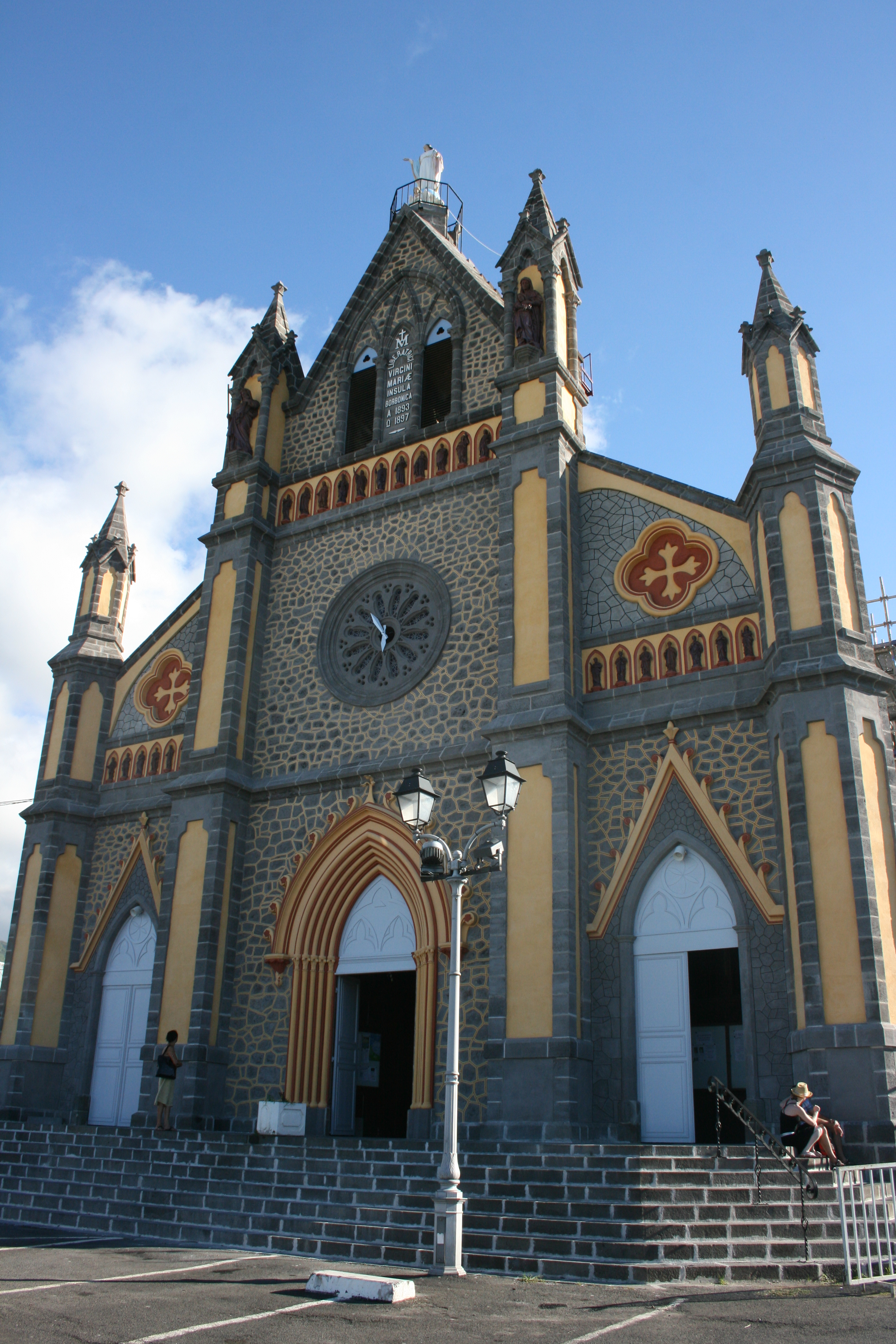
The church in its new colour

L'église Notre-Dame-de-la-Délivrance (the Church of Notre Dame of Délivrance) is a Catholic church in the municipal of Saint-Denis, on the French island département et région of Réunion. It is located in the Petite Île quartier, on the left bank of Saint-Denis River, downstream from the La Redoute quartier and opposite the city centre.

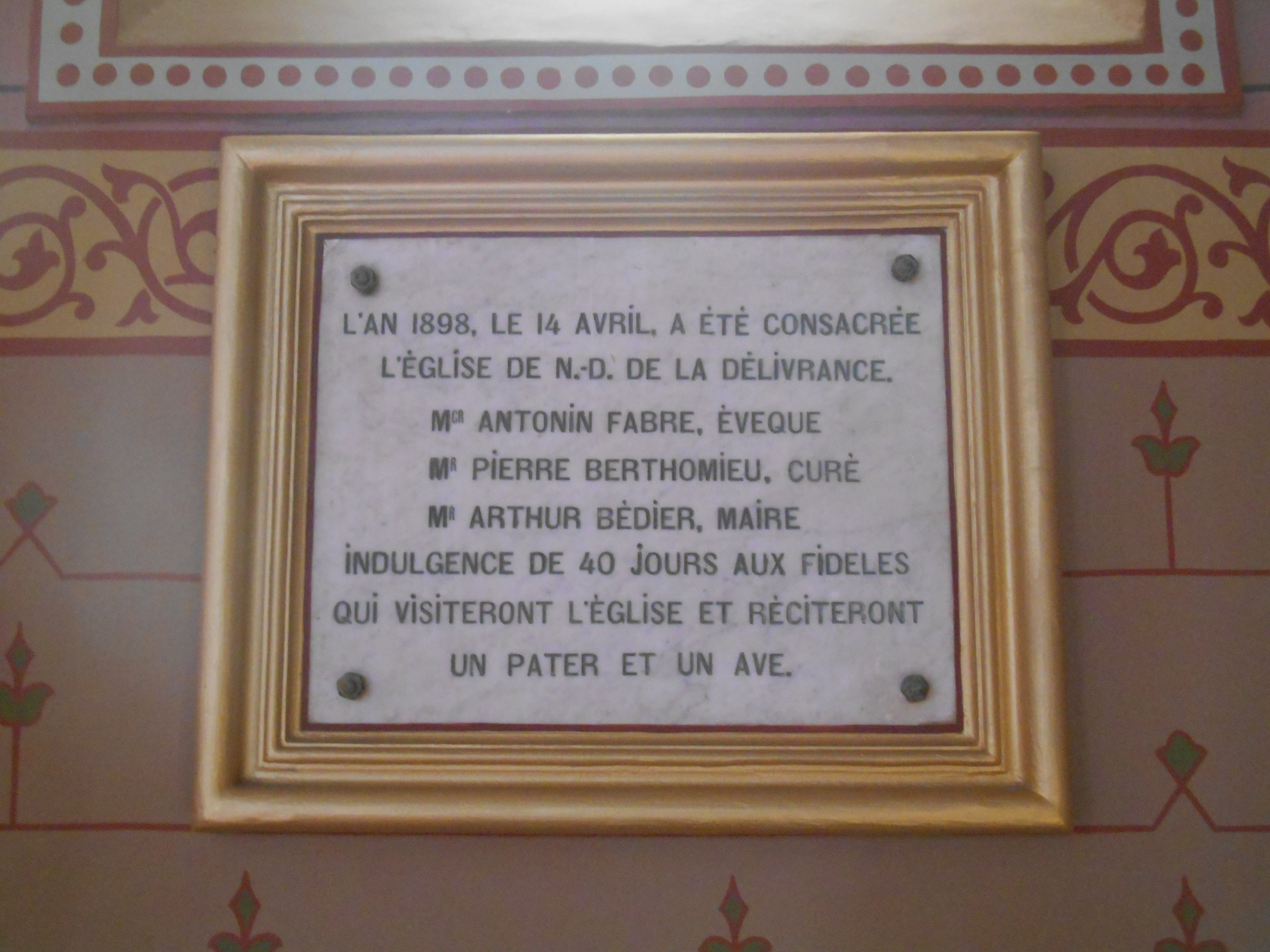

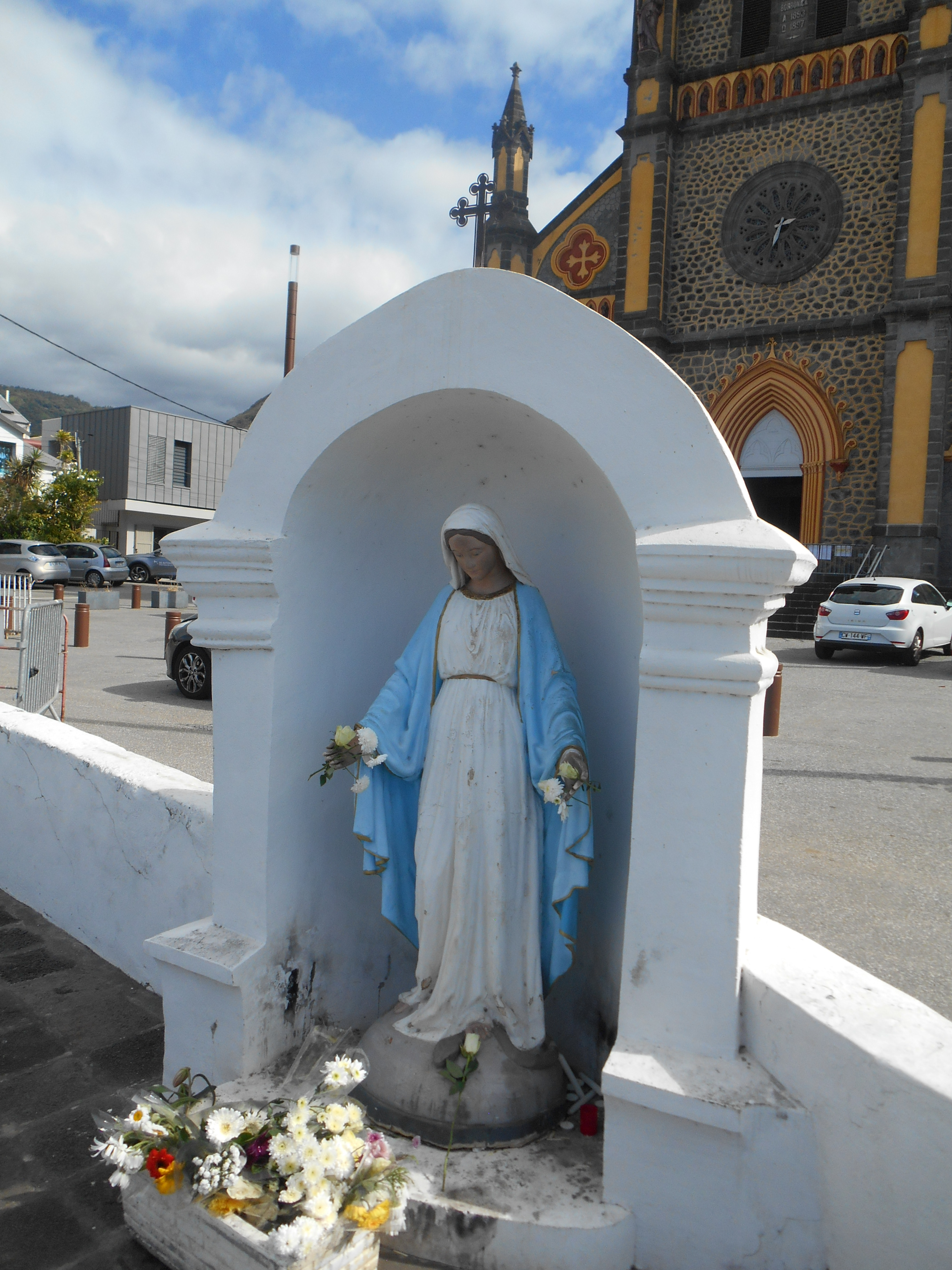

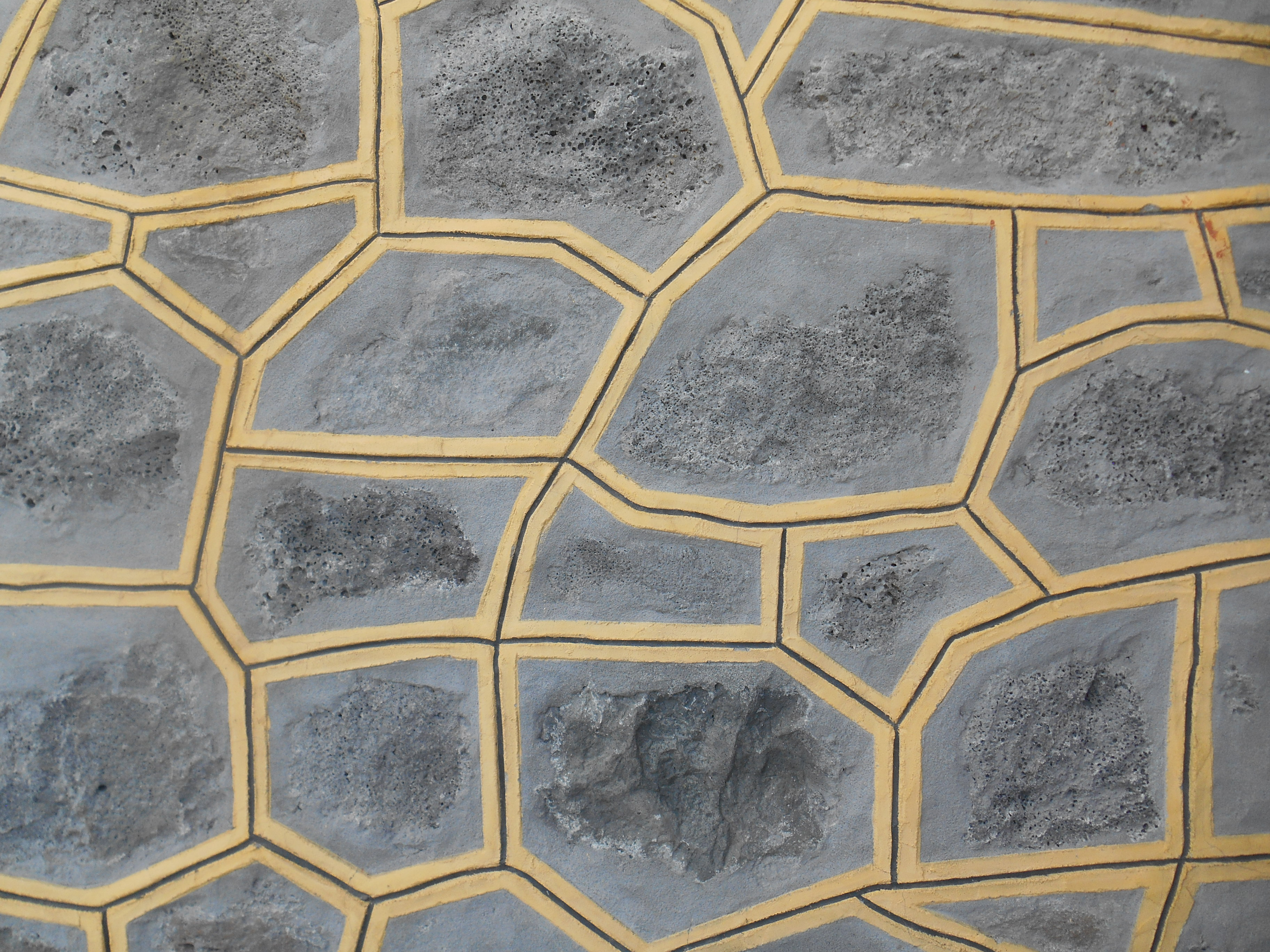

Built in split stone masonry with lime from 1893 to 1897, the Tuscan Gothic church building was listed a Historic Monument on 29 March 1996. This listing was renewed on 29 December 2005.
