= Trypanosoma phedinae =

Scientific classification
- Domain: Eukaryota
- Supergroup: Discoba
- Phylum: Euglenozoa
- Class: Kinetoplastea
- Order: Trypanosomatida
- Family: Trypanosomatidae
- Genus: Trypanosoma
- Subgenus: incertae sedis
- Species: T. phedinae

Binomial name
- Trypanosoma phedinae Peirce, Cheke & Cheke, 1977

Species of bird

Trypanosoma phedinae is a species of excavates with flagella first isolated from the Mascarene martin, Phedina borbonica, in Mauritius.
