= François Pollen =

Dutch naturalist and merchant (1842–1886)

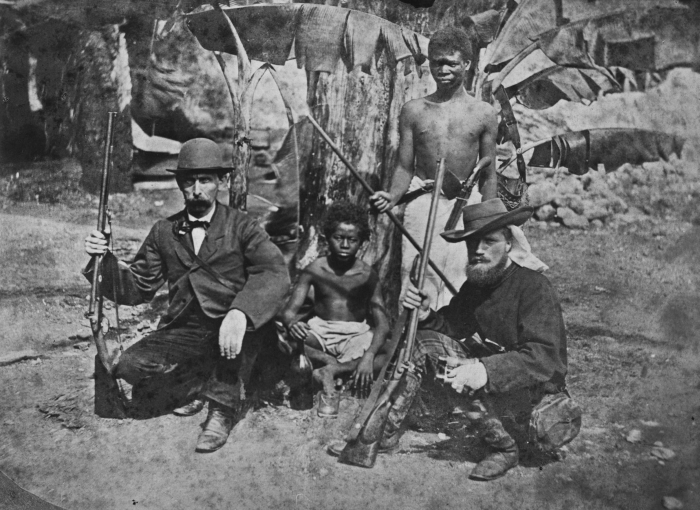
D.C. van Dam and François P.L. Pollen around 1865

François Paul Louis Pollen (1842–1886) was a Dutch naturalist and merchant. He made major contributions to the study of the Malagasy fauna.

== Biography ==
Pollen was born on 8 January 1842 in Rotterdam, Netherlands. He had four siblings. His father M.P. Pollen (1806–1857) was owner of the distillery M.P. Pollen & Zoon in Rotterdam. In 1862, he moved to Leiden to study medicine, but Hermann Schlegel encouraged him to study zoology. Together with his companion Douwe Casparus van Dam (1827–1898) he made an expedition to Madagascar which lasted from November 1863 to July 1866. They collected insects, fish, birds, and mammals for the Rijksmuseum van Natuurlijke Historie in Leiden. Thanks to his wealth Pollen was able to finance this trip by himself. Subsequently, he also financed the field work of other naturalists on Madagascar without being directly involved. Further he collected animal and plant specimens on the Comoros and on the Mascarenes island of Réunion. In 1875 Pollen was awarded an honorary doctorate by the Georg-August University of Göttingen, Germany.

Together with Hermann Schlegel he described the Madagascan fruit bat (Eidolon dupreanum) in 1866. In the same year he described the Réunion cuckooshrike (Coracina newtoni ) and again with Schlegel the vanga genus Newtonia in 1868.

Pollen's name is commemorated in the specific epithets of the Comoros olive pigeon (Columba pollenii), the Pollen's vanga (Xenopirostris polleni), the Mayotte chameleon (Furcifer polleni), and the Madagascar coastal skink (Madascincus polleni). He died on 7 May 1886 in The Hague, Netherlands.

== Publications (selected) ==
- F.P.L. Pollen (1867). Een blik in Madagaskar. (full text with two facsimile plates by John Gerrard Keulemans).
- Recherches sur la faune de Madagascar et de ses dépendances, d'après les découvertes de François P. L. Pollen et D. C. Van Dam (J. K. Steenhoff (E. J. Brill), Leiden). (1868–1877). The work includes the following parts:
  - Part 1. Relation de voyage by François Pollen,
  - Part 2. Mammifères et oiseaux by Hermann Schlegel and François Pollen,
  - Part 3. Reptiles,
  - Part 4. Poissons et pêches by Pieter Bleeker (1819–1878) and François Pollen,
  - Part 5. Insectes ... by Samuel Constantinus Snellen van Vollenhoven (1816–1880) and Edmond de Sélys Longchamps (1813–1900),
  - Crustacés et échinodermes by Christiaan Karel Hoffmann (1844–1903),
  - Mollusques by Johannes Govertus de Man (1850–1930).
