= Bassin du Diable =

Lake in Réunion, France

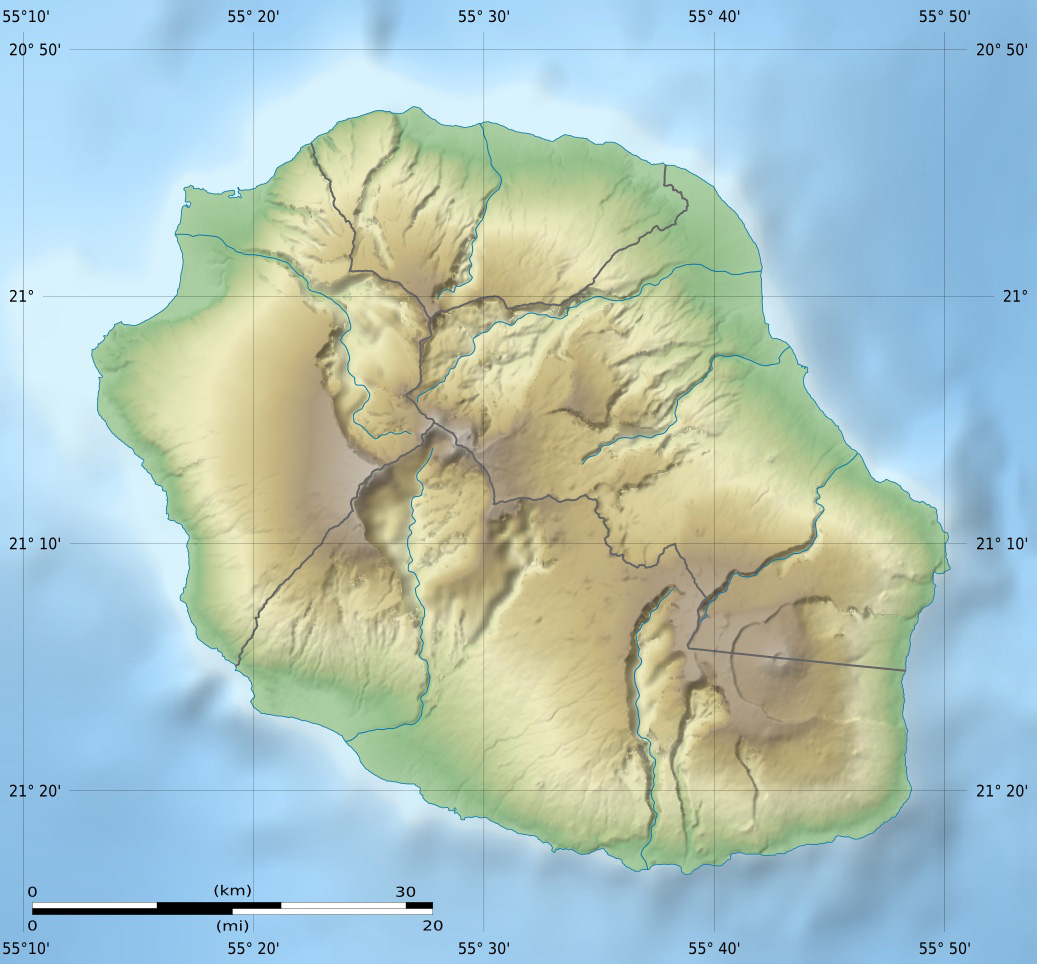
- Location within Réunion
- Location: Réunion
- Coordinates: 20°55′25″S 55°25′32″E
- Basin countries: France (Reunion)
- Surface elevation: 500 m (1,600 ft)
- Islands: 1
- Settlements: Saint-Denis

Bassin du Diable (Devil's Lake) is a lake in the city of Saint-Denis, Réunion, France. This lake is at an elevation of 500 m, from the river bed Grand Bras, a tributary of the Rivière Saint-Denis.

This basin is associated with a legend told in the nineteenth century in the Album of the Reunion of Antoine Louis Roussin.
