= Temnalges =

Scientific classification
- Kingdom: Animalia
- Phylum: Arthropoda
- Subphylum: Chelicerata
- Class: Arachnida
- Order: Sarcoptiformes
- Family: Psoroptoididae
- Genus: Temnalges; Gaud & Atyeo, 1967

Diversity
- 8 species

Genus of mites

Temnalges is a genus of mites belonging to the family Psoroptoididae.

== Species ==
The genus contains the following eight species:

- Temnalges amalicus Shereef & Rakha, 1982
- Temnalges atelodiscus Hernandes & Mironov, 2015
- Temnalges bothrioplax (Gaud, 1958)
- Temnalges fulicae Mironov, Haarder & Galloway 2024.
- Temnalges hoazin Hernandes & Mironov, 2015
- Temnalges mahranus Shereef & Rakha, 1982
- Temnalges megalonyx Gaud, 1968
- Temnalges mesalgoides Gaud & Atyeo, 1967
