= Mascarene white-eye =

The Mascarene white-eye has been split into the following species:

- Réunion grey white-eye, Zosterops borbonicus
- Mauritius grey white-eye, Zosterops mauritianus
