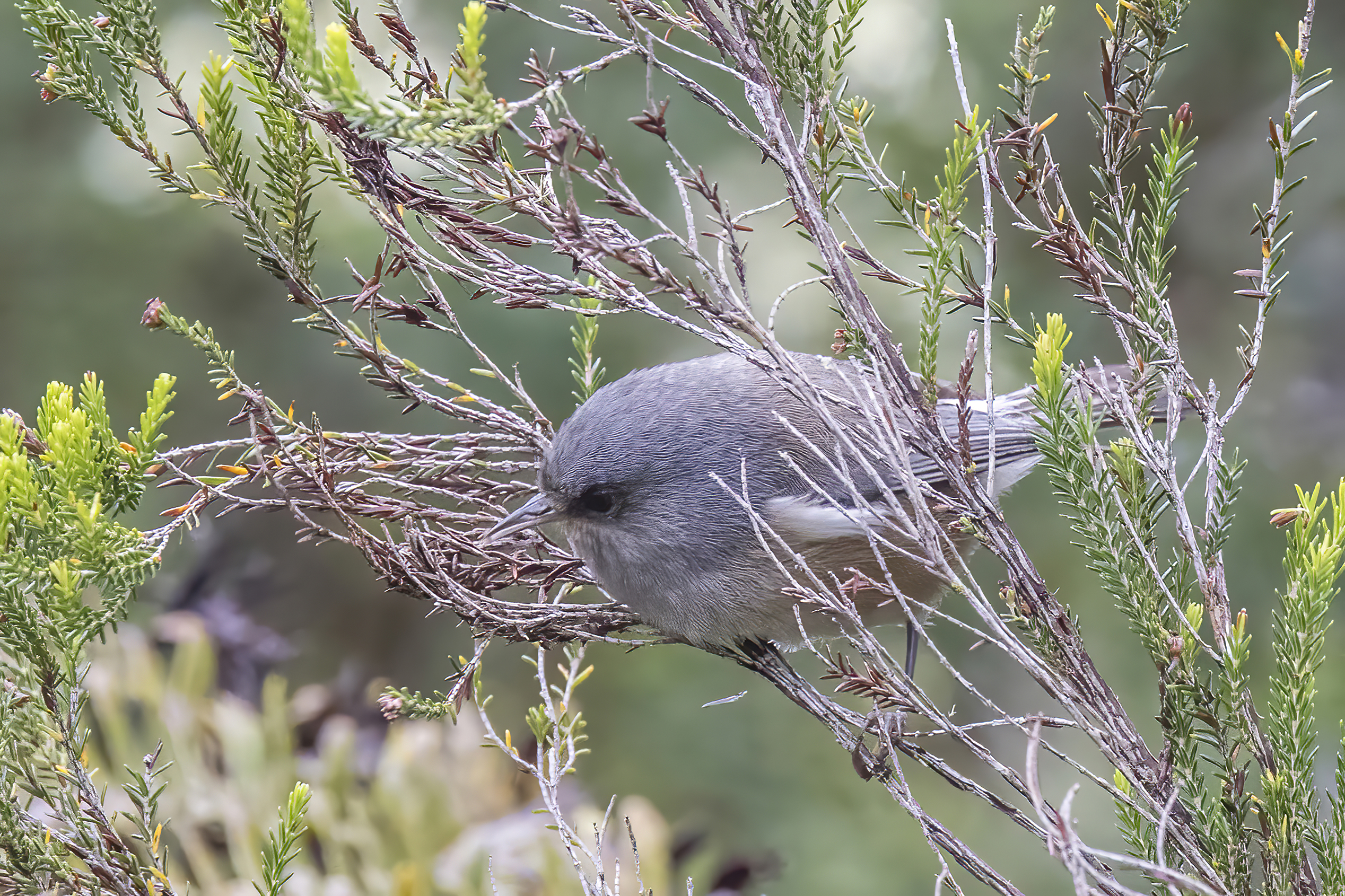
- On the slopes of La Roche Écrite
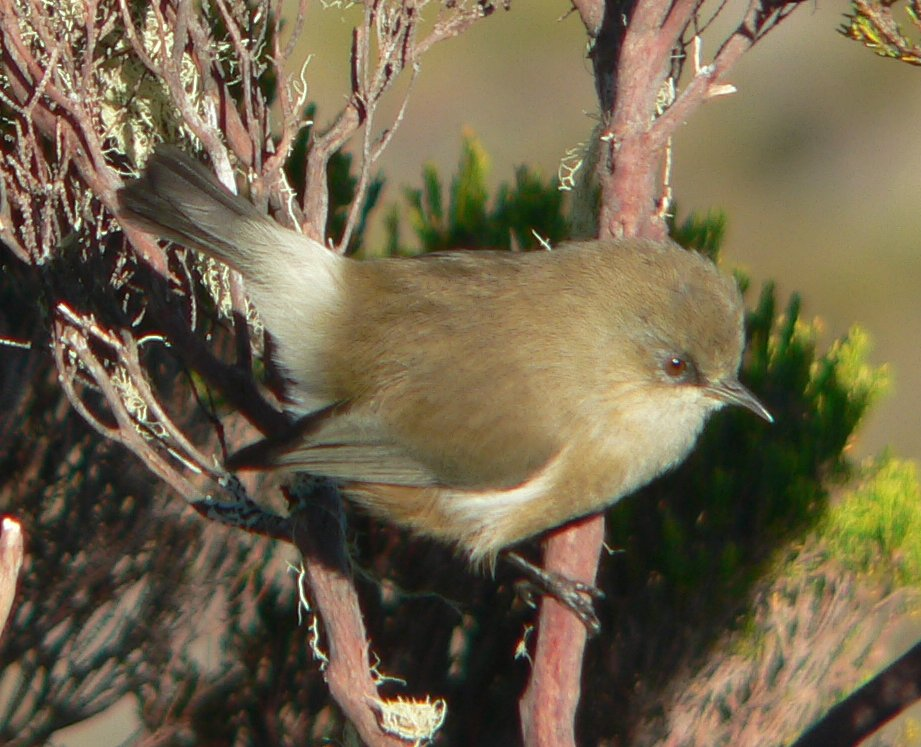
- Brown morph at Plaine des Chicots

Conservation status
- Least Concern (IUCN 3.1)

Scientific classification
- Kingdom: Animalia
- Phylum: Chordata
- Class: Aves
- Order: Passeriformes
- Family: Zosteropidae
- Genus: Zosterops
- Species: Z. borbonicus

Binomial name
- Zosterops borbonicus (Pennant, 1781)
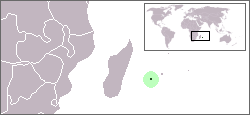
- Range highlighted in green

= Réunion grey white-eye =

Species of bird

The Réunion grey white-eye (Zosterops borbonicus) is a small passerine from the family Zosteropidae, which is native to the islands of Réunion.

== Taxonomy ==
The taxon mauritianus, by most authorities previously considered a subspecies, is now usually considered a separate monotypic species, the Mauritius grey white-eye, (Zosterops mauritianus). Together, both species were called Mascarene white-eye.

There is some uncertainty about the number of subspecies on Réunion, with most authorities only accepting a single, the nominate (Z. b. borbonicus), while some also accept Z. b. alopekion, and Z. b. xerophilus. When only a single Réunion subspecies is accepted, alopekion and xerophilus are considered to represent morphs of the nominate.

== Description ==
It has a length of 9.5 cm. Its plumage exhibits colour morphs which vary from gray to brown. The tail coverts are conspicuously white, unlike those of the Réunion olive white-eye. The rest of the body plumage is variable in hue, though invariably lighter than that of the previous species. It is typically blue-grey with a brownish wash to the mantle, and distinctly rufous-brown flanks. It has chestnut-coloured eyes with a very indistinct eye-ring, as opposed to that of the Réunion olive white-eye. In both species the breast and flank feathers create a white "epaulette" effect.

== Biology ==
It inhabits woodlands, forests, and gardens. It is the only endemic bird from Réunion which has adapted to man-made conditions. Its diet consists of insects, fruits and nectar. It is also the pollinator for orchids like Angraecum striatum or the endemic Trochetia species. It moves often in small groups from six to twenty birds in search of food. They are very noisy. The breeding period is in the southern summer. The female lays two to four pale blue eggs in a cup-shaped nest which is padded with plant material.

== Gallery ==
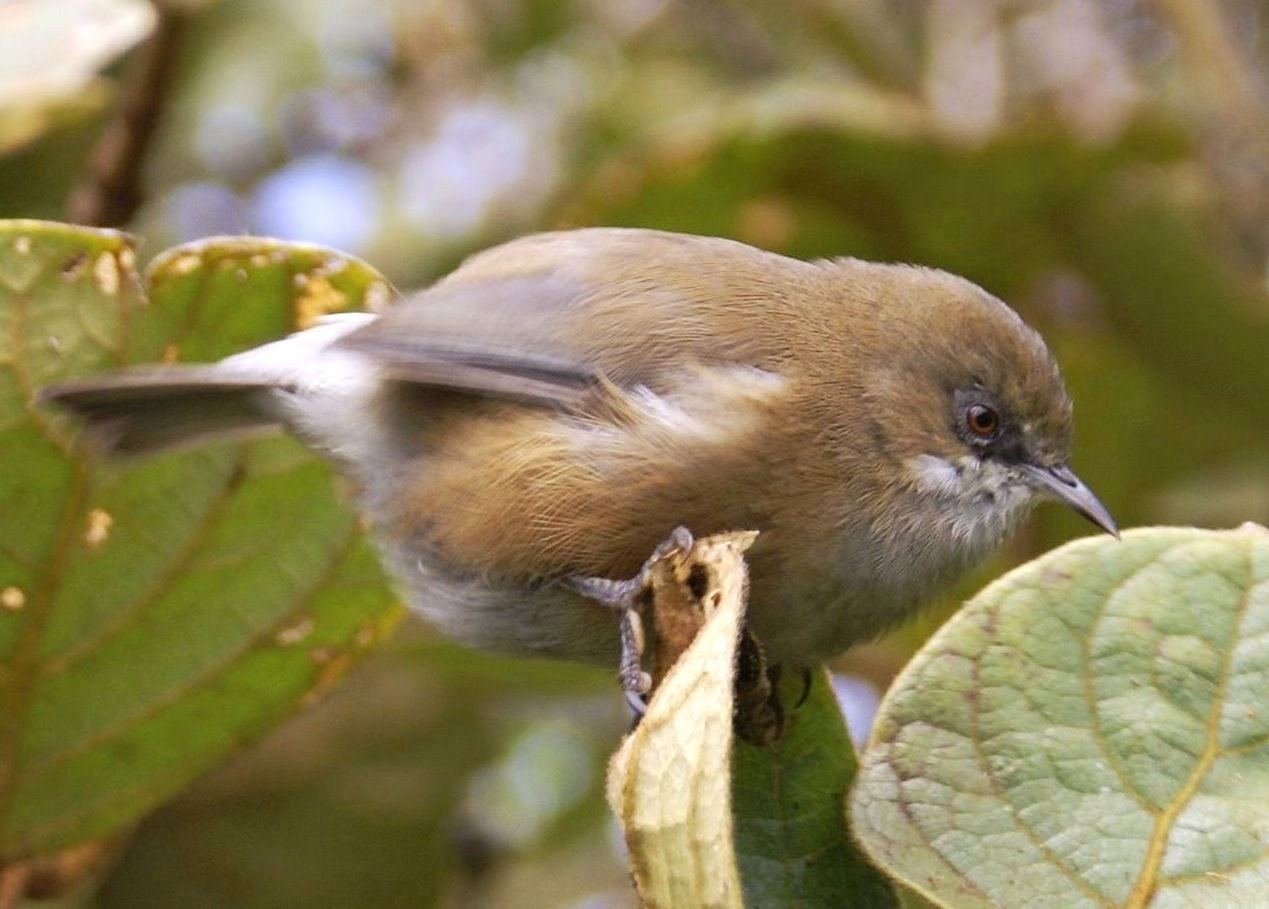
Brown morph at Col des Boeufs displaying white "epaulettes"

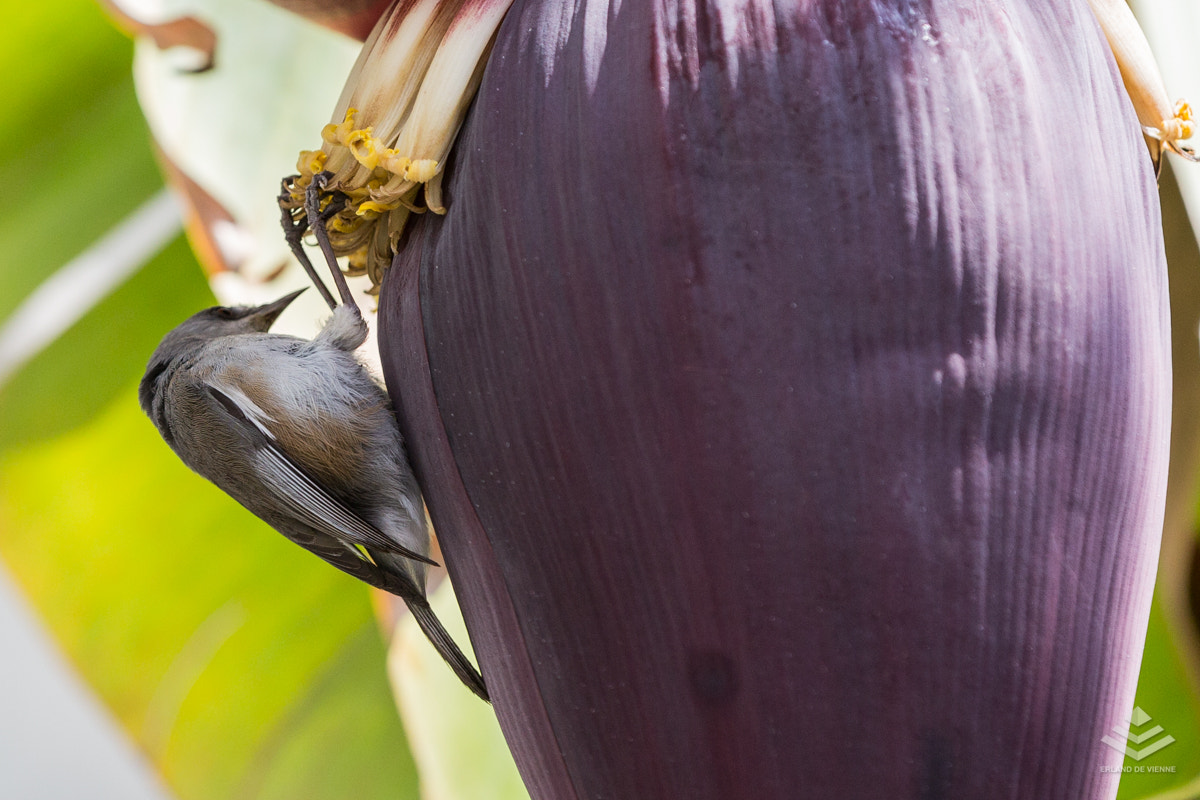
Foraging at a banana inflorescence at Saint-Denis

== Bibliography ==
- France Staub: Birds of the Mascarenes and Saint Brandon. LABAMA HOUSE, Port Louis, Mauritius, 1976.
- France Staub: Fauna of Mauritius and associated flora. Précigraph Limited, Port Louis, Mauritius, 1993.
- Claire Micheneau, Jacques Fournel & Thierry Pailler: Bird Pollination in an Angraecoid Orchid on Reunion Island (Mascarene Archipelago, Indian Ocean). Annals of Botany 97: S. 965–974, 2006 doi:10.1093/aob/mcl056 PDF fulltext
