= Psoroptoididae =

Scientific classification
- Kingdom: Animalia
- Phylum: Arthropoda
- Subphylum: Chelicerata
- Class: Arachnida
- Order: Sarcoptiformes
- Suborder: Astigmata
- Family: Psoroptoididae

Family of mites

Psoroptoididae is a family of mites belonging to the order Sarcoptiformes.

Genera:

- Allopsoroptoides Mironov, 2013
- Anomothrix Gaud, 1973
- Dicamaralges Gaud & Atyeo, 1967
- Eurydiscalges Faccini, Gaud & Atyeo, 1976
- Hexacaudalges Mironov & Proctor, 2005
- Mesalges Trouessart, 1888
- Mesalgoides Gaud & Atyeo, 1967
- Pandalura Hull, 1932
- Picalgoides Cerny, 1974
- Psoroptoides Trouessart, 1919
- Temnalges Gaud & Atyeo, 1967
