= Rivière Saint-Denis =

River in France

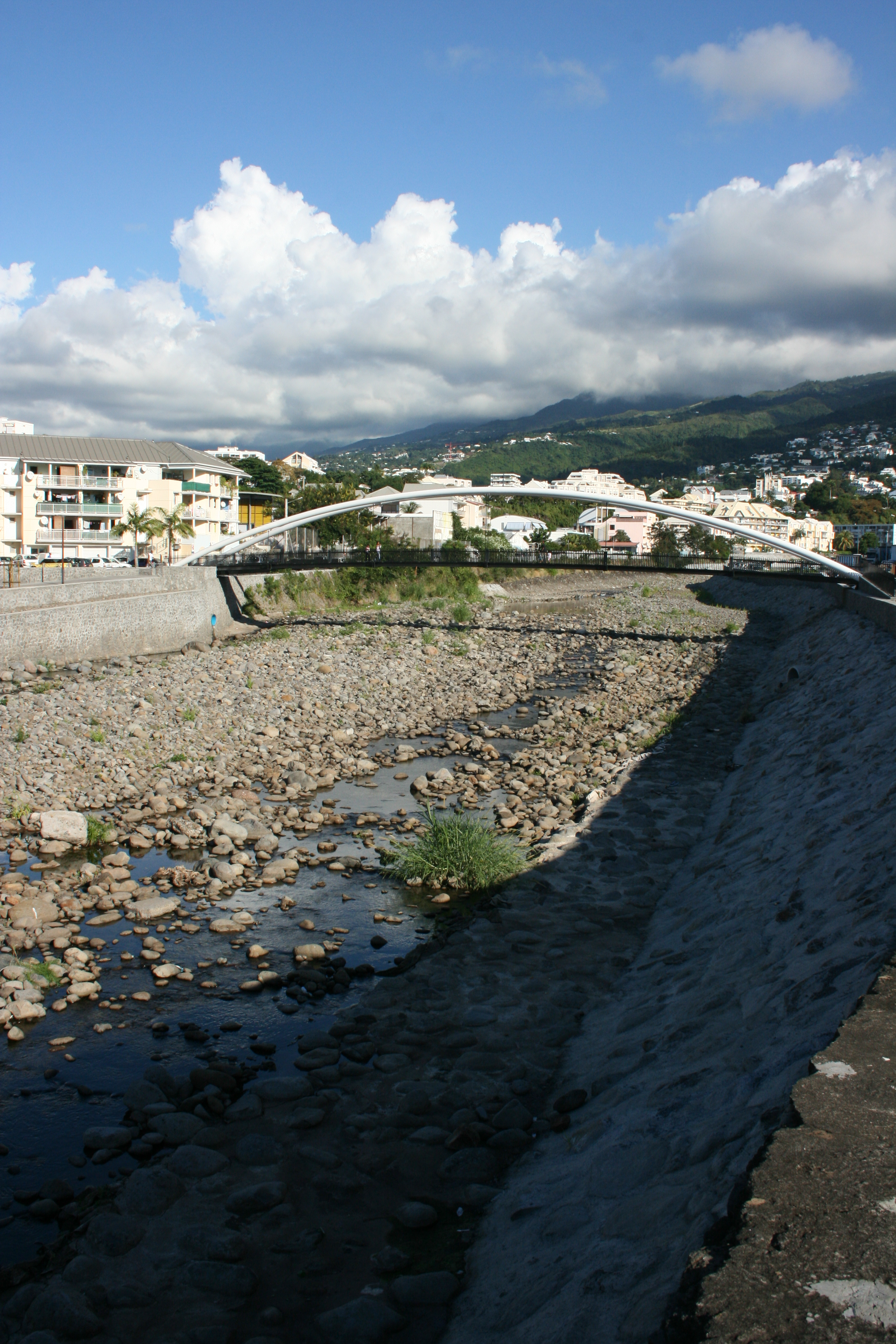

Location
- Country: France
- Region: Réunion

Physical characteristics
- Mouth: Indian Ocean
  - coordinates: 20°52′31″S 55°26′37″E
- Length: 15.5 km (9.6 mi)

The Rivière Saint-Denis is a river on the Indian Ocean island of Réunion. The 15.5 km (9.6 mi) long river enters the sea close to the island's northernmost point after flowing through the Plaine des Chicots – Plaine d'Affouches Important Bird Area and then the capital, Saint-Denis.

== See also ==
- Bassin du Diable
