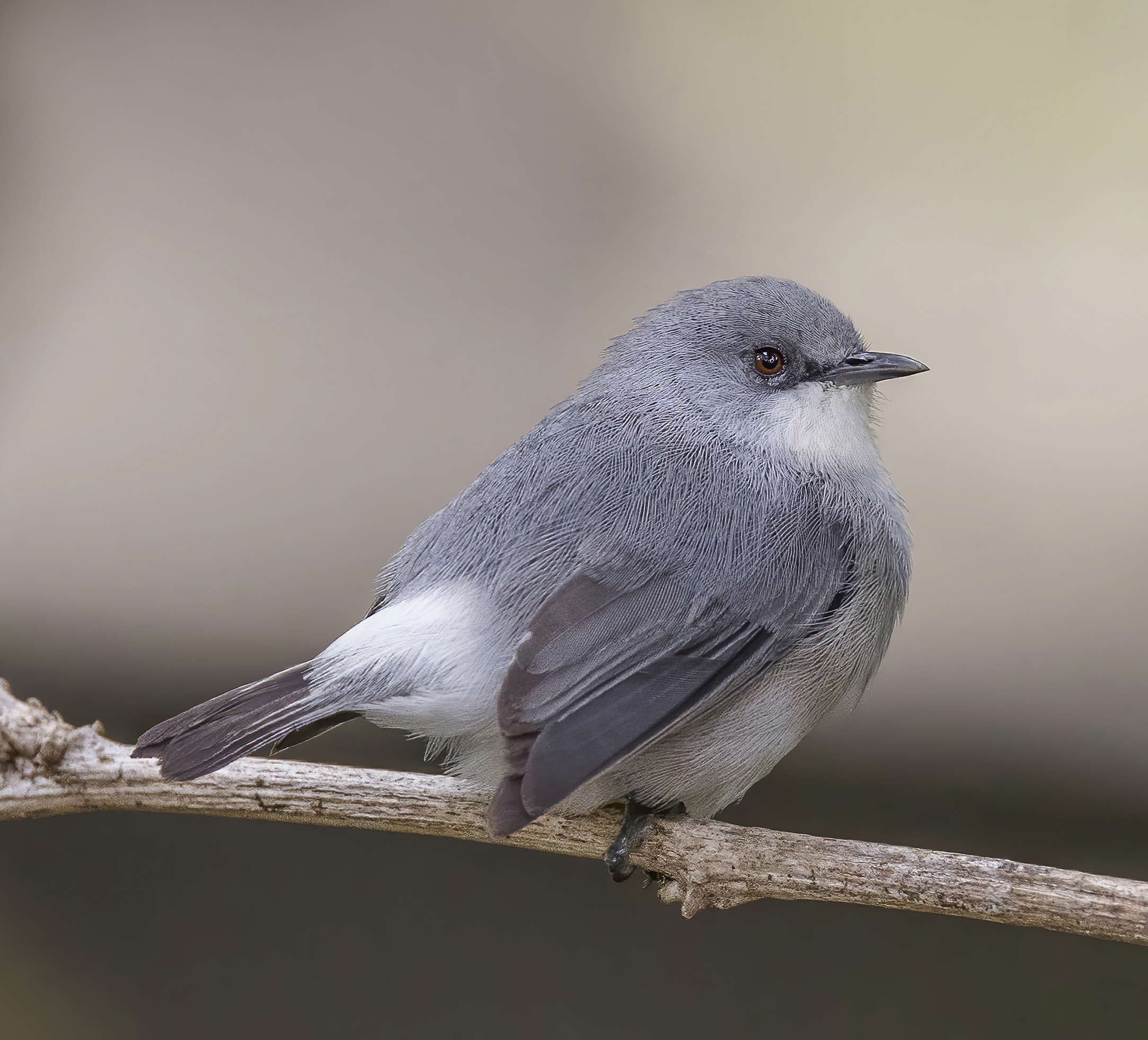

Conservation status
- Least Concern (IUCN 3.1)

Scientific classification
- Domain: Eukaryota
- Kingdom: Animalia
- Phylum: Chordata
- Class: Aves
- Order: Passeriformes
- Family: Zosteropidae
- Genus: Zosterops
- Species: Z. mauritianus

Binomial name
- Zosterops mauritianus (Gmelin, JF, 1789)
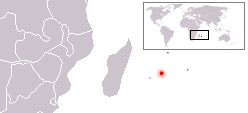
- Range highlighted in red

Synonyms
- Speirops borbonicus mauritianus

= Mauritius grey white-eye =

Species of bird

The Mauritius grey white-eye (Zosterops mauritianus) is a species of bird in the family Zosteropidae. It is one of two white-eye species endemic to the island of Mauritius, the other being the rare and localized Mauritius olive white-eye. It inhabits woodlands, forests, and gardens. The Réunion grey white-eye is very closely related. They were formerly considered conspecific and together called Mascarene white-eye.

== Taxonomy ==
The Mauritius grey white-eye was formally described in 1789 by the German naturalist Johann Friedrich Gmelin in his revised and expanded edition of Carl Linnaeus's Systema Naturae. He placed it with the wagtails in the genus Motacilla and coined the binomial name Motacilla mauritiana. Gmelin based his account on the "Figuier bleu" that had been described in 1778 by the French polymath, the Comte de Buffon, in his Histoire Naturelle des Oiseaux. A hand-coloured engraving by François-Nicolas Martinet was published to accompany Buffon's text. The Mauritius grey white-eye is now placed with around one hundred white-eyes in the genus Zosterops that was introduced in 1827 by Nicholas Vigors and Thomas Horsfield.

== Gallery ==
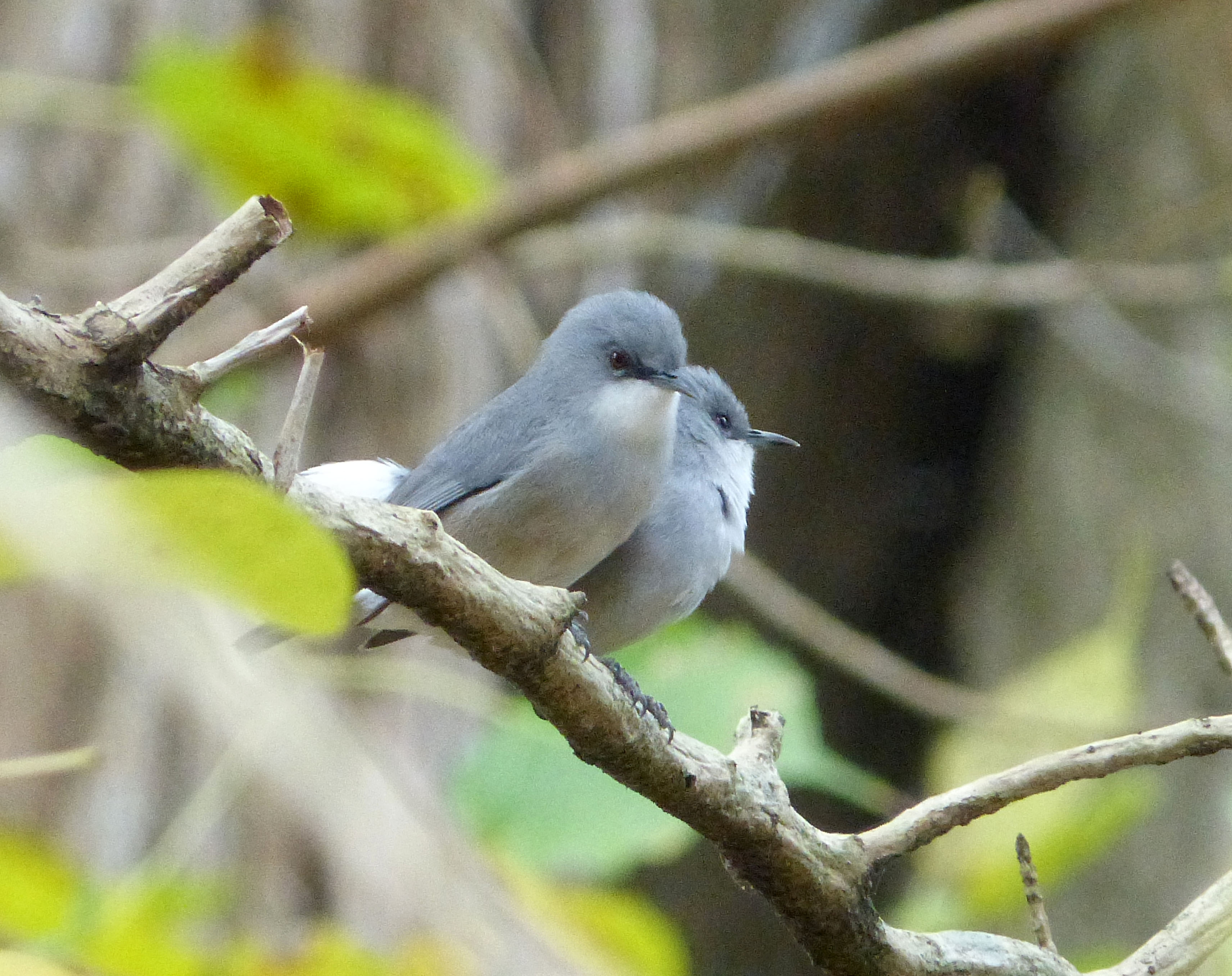
A pair at Ramgoolam Botanical Garden

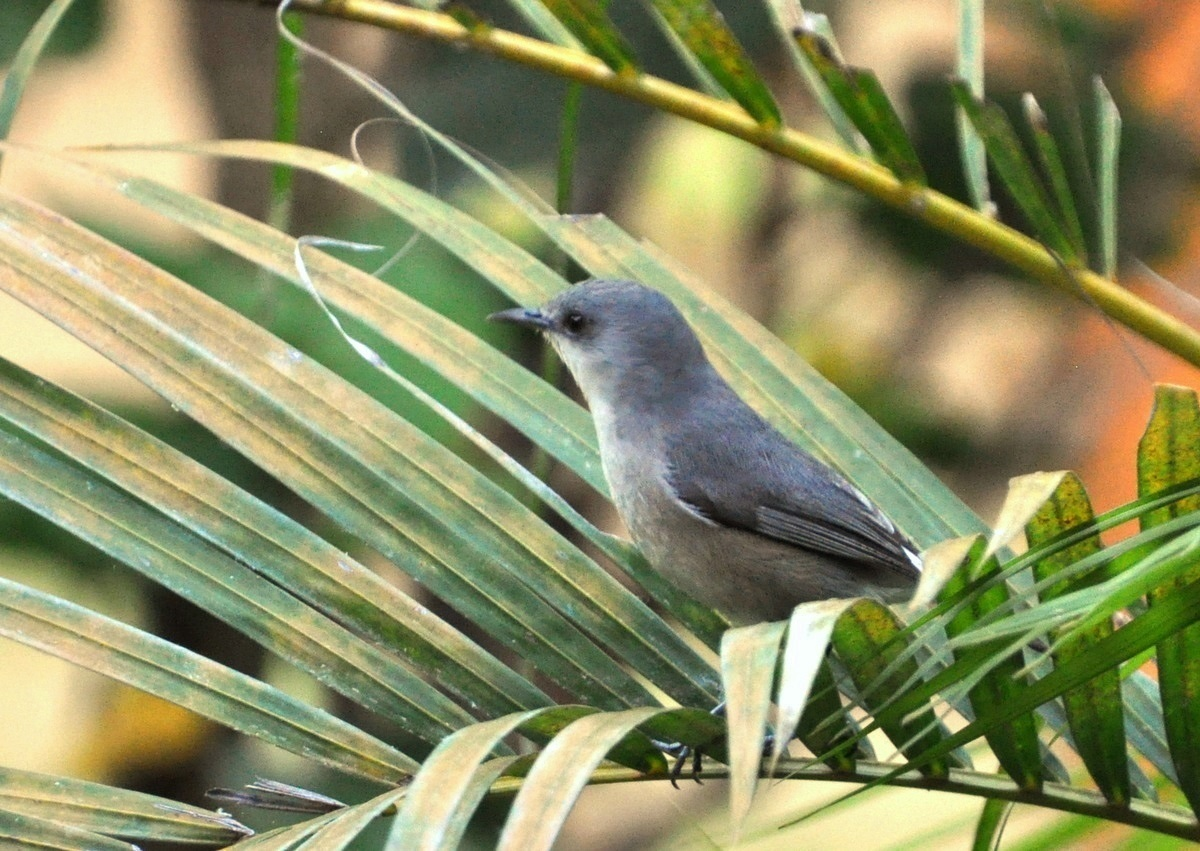
At the Black River estuary

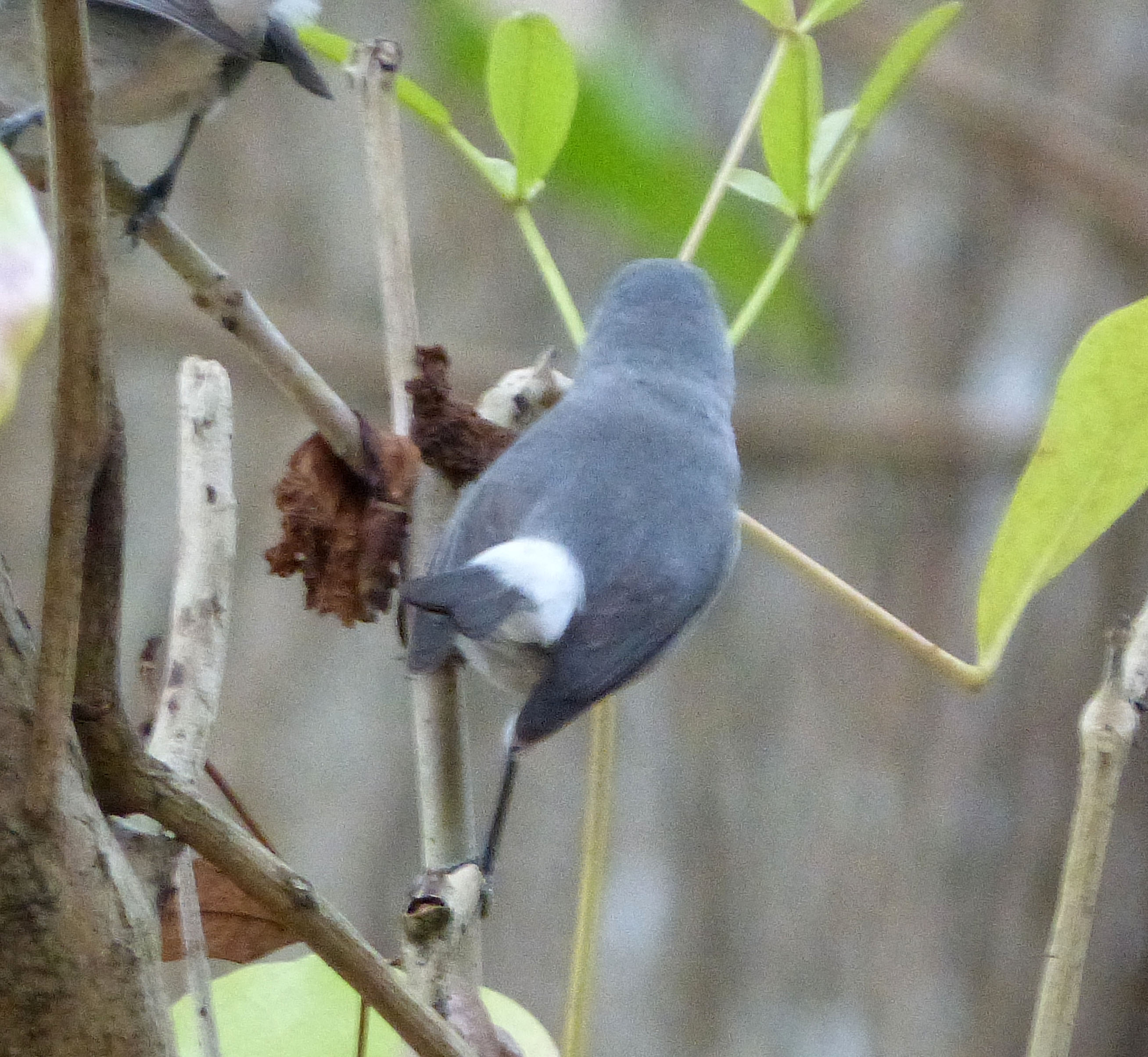
View of the white tail coverts

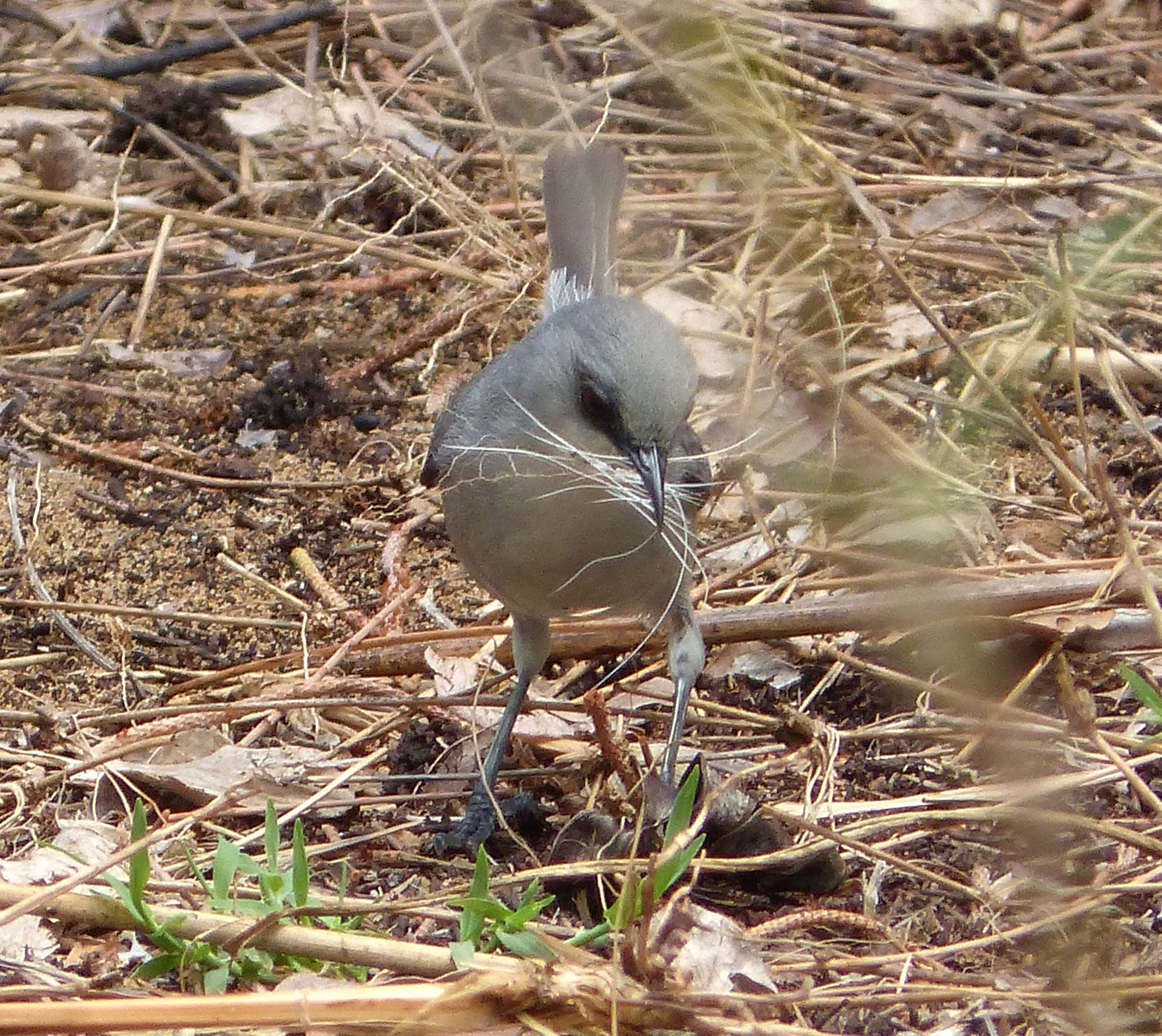
Collecting nesting material
