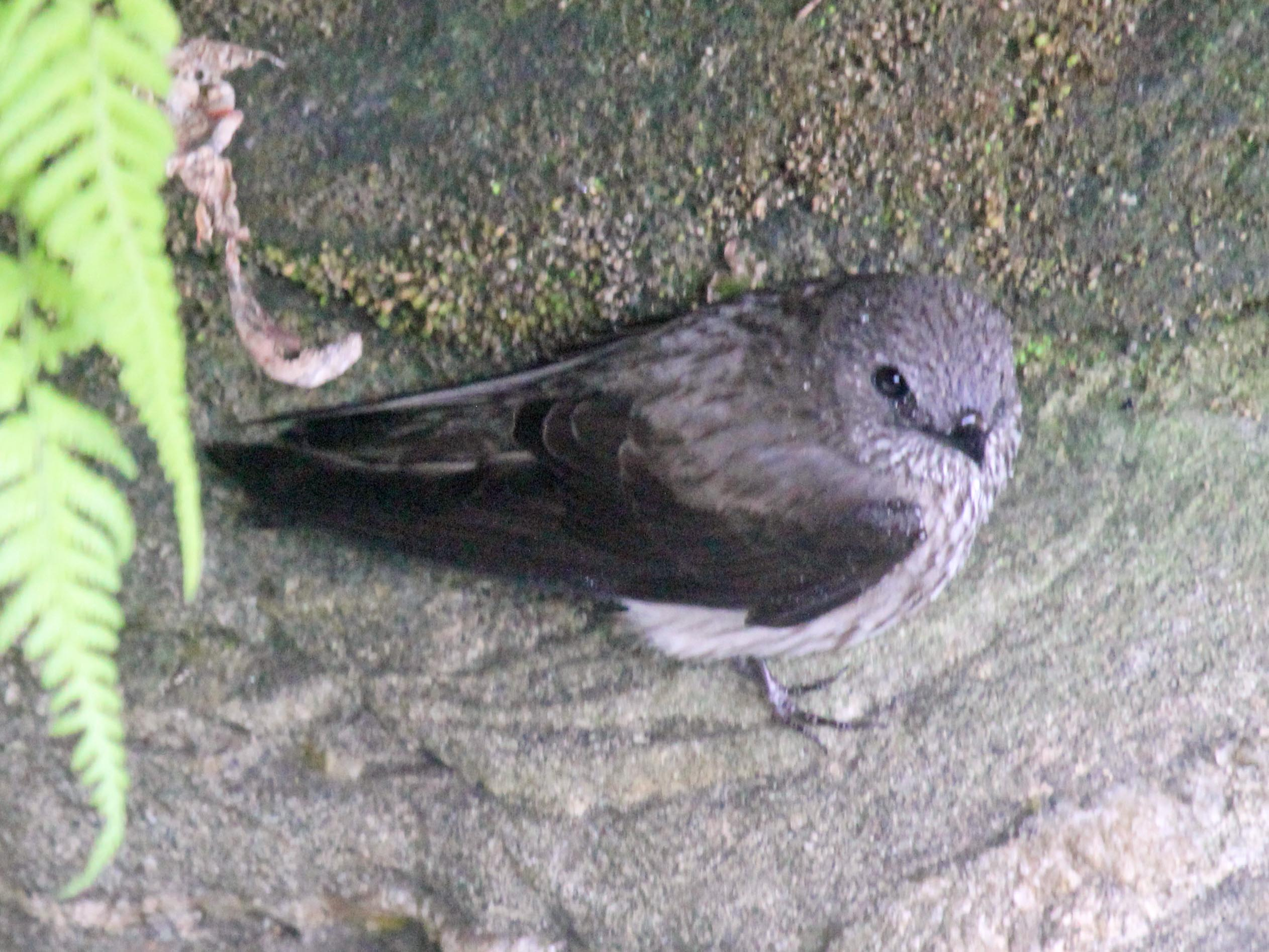
- At Ranomafana, Madagascar

Conservation status
- Least Concern (IUCN 3.1)

Scientific classification
- Kingdom: Animalia
- Phylum: Chordata
- Class: Aves
- Order: Passeriformes
- Family: Hirundinidae
- Genus: Phedina; Bonaparte, 1855
- Species: P. borbonica

Binomial name
- Phedina borbonica (Gmelin, 1789)
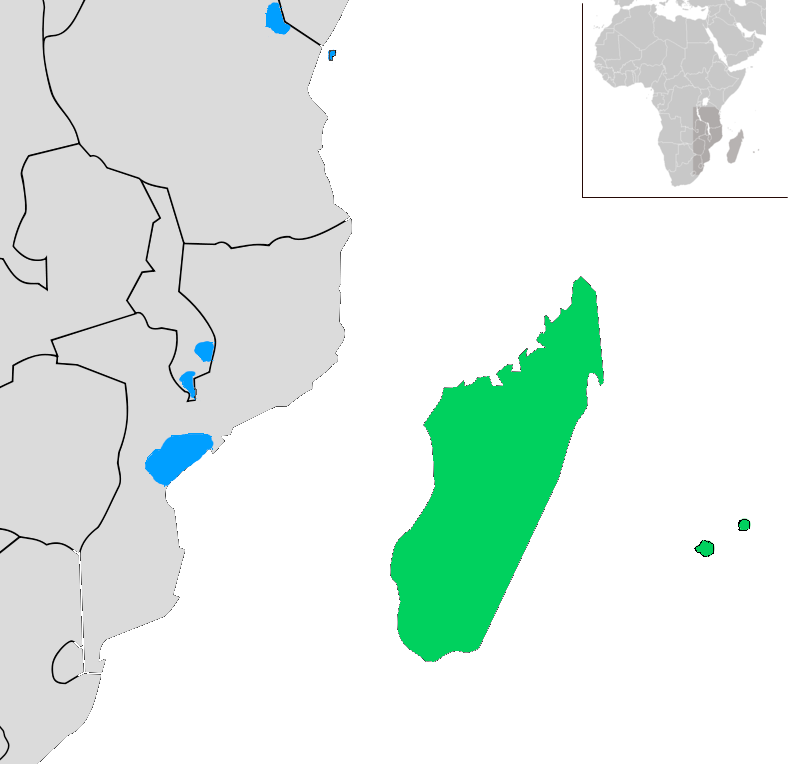
- Approximate range in Africa Resident Non-breeding

Synonyms
- Cotyle borbonica Gmelin, 1789; Hirundo borbonica. Bonaparte, 1850.

= Mascarene martin =

Passerine bird in the swallow family that breeds im Madagascar, Mauritius and Réunion

The Mascarene martin or Mascarene swallow (Phedina borbonica) is a passerine bird in the swallow family that breeds in Madagascar and in the Mascarene Islands. The nominate subspecies occurs on Mauritius and Réunion and has never been found away from the Mascarene Islands, but the smaller Madagascan subspecies, P. b. madagascariensis, is migratory and has been recorded wintering in East Africa or wandering to other Indian Ocean islands.

The Mascarene martin is a small swallow that has grey-brown underparts becoming white on the throat and lower abdomen, dark grey-brown upperparts and a slightly forked tail. The underparts are heavily streaked with black. It nests in small colonies anywhere with suitably sheltered sites for constructing a nest, such as ledges, buildings, tunnels, caves or amongst rocks. The nest is a shallow cup of twigs and other plant material, and the normal clutch is two or three brown-spotted white eggs. The incubation and fledging times are unknown. The Mascarene martin has a heavy flight with slow wingbeats interspersed with glides, and frequently perches on wires. It feeds on insects in flight, often hunting low over the ground or vegetation. In eastern Africa, open habitats such as deforested areas are frequently used for hunting. A number of internal and external parasites have been detected in this species.

Tropical cyclones can adversely affect populations on the smaller islands, but the Mascarene martin is a locally common bird with an apparently stable population and is classed as a species of Least Concern by the International Union for Conservation of Nature (IUCN). Its legal protection ranges from none on the French overseas department of Réunion to a status on Mauritius as a "species of wildlife in respect of which more severe penalties are provided".

== Taxonomy ==
The Mascarene martin was first formally described in 1789 as Hirundo borbonica by German zoologist Johann Friedrich Gmelin in his 13th edition of Linnaeus's Systema Naturae. Gmelin based his account on "La grande hirondelle brune à ventre tacheté" that had been described in 1779 by the French polymath, the Comte de Buffon in his multi-volume work Histoire Naturelle des Oiseaux. It is likely that the species had previously been described by French naturalist Philibert Commerson who died in Mauritius in 1773. His huge collection of specimens and notes was sent back to the Paris Museum in 1774, but destroyed by sulphur fumigation in about 1810. French biologist Charles Lucien Bonaparte moved the martin to his newly created genus Phedina in 1855. The genus name is derived from the Greek phaios (φαιός) "brown" and the Italian rondine "swallow", and the species name refers to the Île de Bourbon (old French name for Réunion). There are two subspecies, nominate P. b. borbonica on Mauritius and Réunion, and P. b. madagascariensis in Madagascar.

Phedina is placed within the Hirundininae subfamily, which comprises all swallows and martins except the very distinctive river martins. DNA sequence studies suggest that there are three major groupings within the Hirundininae, broadly correlating with the type of nest built. These groups are the "core martins", including burrowing species like the sand martin; the "nest-adopters", which are birds like the tree swallow that utilise natural cavities; and the "mud nest builders", such as the barn swallow, which build a nest from mud. Mascarene martins nest in burrows and therefore belong to the "core martins".

The genus Phedina is thought to be an early offshoot from the main swallow lineage, although the striped plumage suggests a distant relationship with streaked African Hirundo species. The Brazza's martin, P. brazzae, formerly was included in this genus, but now is included in its own genus, Phedinopsis, due to the significant differences in vocalisations and nest type from its relative. German ornithologist Gustav Hartlaub separated the Madagascan population of the Mascarene martin as a full species, P. madagascariensis, but more recent authorities have considered it to be only a subspecies, P. b. madagascariensis.

== Description ==
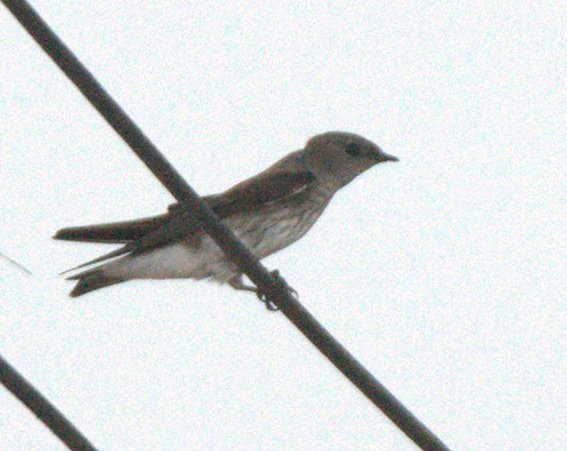

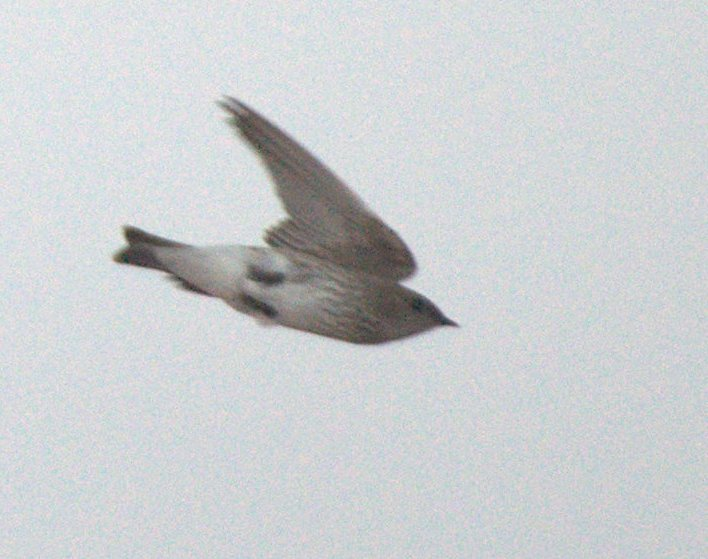
Madagascan subspecies at Bagamoyo, Tanzania

Adult Mascarene martins of the nominate subspecies are 15 cm (5.9 in) long with wings averaging 117 mm (4.6 in) and weigh 23.9 g (0.84 oz). This small hirundine has dark brown-grey upperparts with faint streaking. It has grey-brown underparts becoming white on the throat and lower abdomen, all being heavily streaked with black. The slightly forked tail averages 54.6 mm (2.15 in) long and has white edges to the brown undertail coverts. The wings are blackish-brown and the bill and legs are black. The eyes are dark brown and the black bill averages 11.3 mm (0.44 in) long. The sexes are similar, but juvenile birds have more diffuse breast streaking, and white tips to the feathers covering the closed wing. The Madagascan subspecies is overall paler and larger-billed than the nominate form. It has denser streaking on the breast, but only very fine lines on the lower abdomen and on the white undertail. It is distinctly smaller than the nominate subspecies, 12–14 cm (4.7–5.5 in) in length with an average weight of 20.6 g (0.73 oz). This martin moults in December and January on Mauritius, and Madagascan breeders wintering on the African mainland moult in June and July.

The Mascarene martin is a relatively quiet bird, but it has a warbled siri-liri siri-liri song given in flight or when perched; some calls given by perched birds end in a glissando. Other vocalisations may be used during mating or displays of aggression. There is a chip contact call, and the young birds produce a fast twittering sound when begging for food. Birds wintering in mainland Africa are usually silent.

No other streaked swallow species occur within the island breeding range of the Mascarene martin, and in Africa the lesser striped swallow is larger, has a deeply forked tail and a very different plumage, with dark blue upperparts, a red rump and a chestnut head. The brown-throated sand martin has similar structure and plumage colour to the Mascarene martin, but has plain, unstreaked underparts. The small Mascarene swiftlet has longer, narrower wings than the martin, and a much lighter flight. The Brazza's martin is smaller, has a plainer back and finer dashing on the throat and chest, but there is no range overlap.

== Distribution and habitat ==
The Mascarene martin's breeding range is restricted to Madagascar and the Mascarene Islands. The nominate subspecies breeds on Mauritius and Réunion and P. b. madagascariensis occurs in Madagascar. It may also nest on Pemba Island where it has been seen in the breeding season. Breeding habitat can be anywhere with suitable sites for constructing a nest, such as ledges, buildings, tunnels, caves or amongst rocks. The martin is found on the east side of Réunion between 200–500 m (660–1,640 ft), and on the south and west coasts of Mauritius. It also occurs on inland cliffs on Mauritius.

The subspecies P. b. borbonica is resident on Mauritius and Réunion, although there are local seasonal movements on these islands, but the Madagascan subspecies is migratory. The Imerina Plateau is deserted from April to September, the martins moving to lower ground or to the African mainland. It is normally uncommon and local in coastal Mozambique, Zambia, Malawi and Pemba Island, and very rare in Kenya and mainland Tanzania, although large numbers sometimes winter in Mozambique or Malawi. It has also been recorded from Comoros and other Indian Ocean locations including at least four islands in the Seychelles. As of 2012, a total of eight birds had been sighted in the Seychelles, occurring in both the spring and autumn migration periods. Some of these records may be due to vagrant birds carried by cyclones. There are unsubstantiated claims of occurrences in the Transvaal.

== Behaviour ==
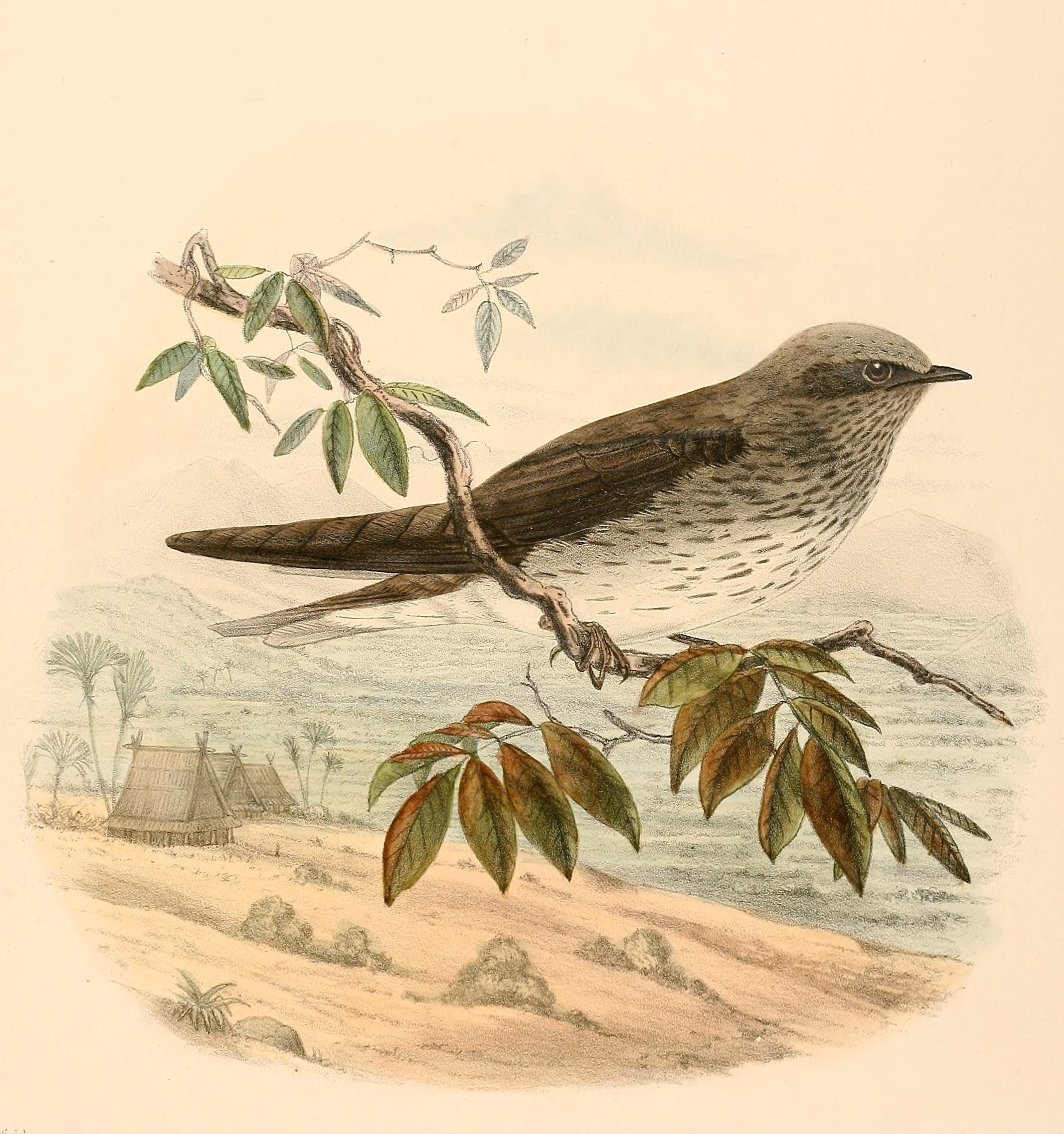
Madagascan subspecies by Claude W. Wyatt, 1894

The Mascarene martin has a heavy flight with slow wingbeats interspersed with glides, and may repeatedly return to a favourite perch. This martin is often seen perched on wires, and sometimes rests on sandy beaches. The martin roosts in small flocks in bushes, on buildings or on cliffs. Sometimes it is joined at the roost by other birds, such as blue-cheeked bee-eaters in the Seychelles.

=== Breeding ===
The Mascarene martin nests in the wet season, August to November in Madagascar, and September to early January on Mauritius and Réunion. It breeds in groups typically comprising a few pairs, although a colony of about 20 pairs has been recorded on Mauritius. The nest is a shallow cup of twigs and coarse plant material such as grass and Casuarina with a softer lining of feathers and finer vegetation. It may be constructed anywhere suitably flat and inaccessible to predators, including locations 3–5 m (9.8–16.4 ft) over water, on slate ledges, or in underground passageways; one particularly unusual nesting site was on a small boat moored 20 m (66 ft) off the coast. The normal clutch is two eggs on Madagascar and Mauritius, but two or three on Réunion. The eggs are white with brown spots and average 21.6 mm × 15 mm (0.85 in × 0.59 in) with a weight of 2.5 g (0.088 oz) and are incubated by the female alone. The incubation and fledging times are unknown, although as with all hirundines the chicks are altricial, hatching naked and blind. The male helps to feed the young, and the chicks are fed by the parents after fledging, and one pair on Mauritius was observed to feed its two chicks at roughly five-minute intervals.

=== Feeding ===
The martins feed in flight, often low over the ground or vegetation. They hunt singly, in small groups or with other swallows and swifts, and are most active just before dusk. The flying insects that make up their diet include scarab, click and other beetles, bugs and flying ants. The feeding habitat in Madagascar includes woodlands, agricultural land, wetlands, semi-desert and open ground at altitudes up to 2,200 m (7,200 ft). In Mauritius and Réunion this martin feeds from sea level up to 1,500 m (4,900 ft) over reservoirs and coasts, along cliffs and over Casuarina or other trees and scrubs, and in eastern Africa, areas deforested by logging or conversion to agriculture are used for hunting.

== Predators and parasites ==
Mascarene martins will mob the Mauritius kestrel, suggesting that it is perceived as a potential predator. Martins on Mauritius may be infected by an endemic trypanosome, Trypanosoma phedinae, although the pathogenicity is unknown. Protozoan blood parasites of the genus Haemoproteus have also been found in the martin on Mauritius, although no blood parasites were found in a Madagascan specimen. A new species of louse fly, Ornithomya cecropis, was first found on a martin in Madagascar, and another bird from that island carried the feather mite Mesalges hirsutus, more commonly found in parrots.

== Status ==
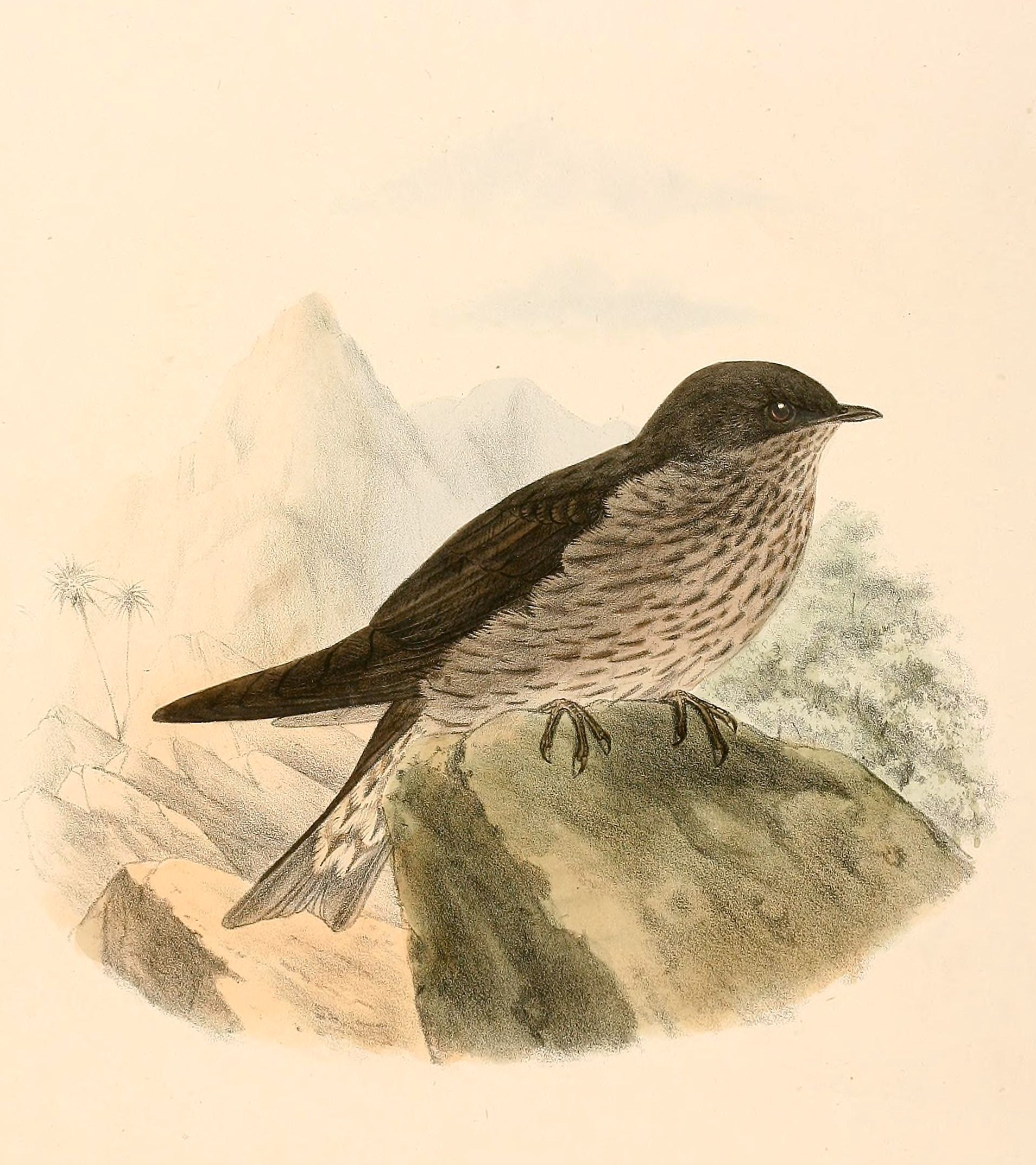
Mascarene subspecies by Claude W. Wyatt, 1894

The breeding range of the Mascarene martin is restricted to three islands. Madagascar has an area of 592,800 square kilometres (228,900 sq mi), but the next largest island, Réunion, is just 2,512 square kilometres (970 sq mi). Although this bird has a limited range, it is abundant on Mauritius and Réunion, and locally common in Madagascar. The population size is unknown, but exceeds the vulnerability threshold of 10,000 mature individuals and is believed to be stable. This martin is therefore classed as a species of Least Concern by the International Union for Conservation of Nature.

Tropical cyclones present a natural threat, particularly on the small islands inhabited by the nominate subspecies. The populations on Mauritius and Réunion were badly affected by a cyclone in February 1861, and a British ornithologist, Edward Newton, claimed not to have seen a single specimen on Mauritius between the six-day storm and June of the following year. It took many years for this population to fully recover, but by about 1900 it was reported to be common but local, and in 1973–74 there were 200–400 pairs on Réunion and 70–75 pairs in Mauritius. More recent cyclones, like one in 1980, seem to have had less damaging effects than the 1861 storm. A number of species in the region are vulnerable partly because they are restricted to one island, or are badly affected by habitat degradation or introduced predators, and several species have been lost from the Mascarene islands since human colonisation in the seventeenth century. The martin and the Mascarene Swiftlet occur on all the main islands, and are less vulnerable to the effects of human activities, especially since they can utilise houses for nest sites.

In Mauritius, the Mascarene martin is legally protected as a "species of wildlife in respect of which more severe penalties are provided". It is illegal to kill any bird of the species or to take or destroy their nests under section 16 of the Wildlife and National Parks Act 1993, although Madagascar and the African mainland countries have no special measures beyond general bird protection legislation. Réunion is an overseas department of France, but the Birds Directive does not apply outside Europe, so there is no European-level bird protection legislation effective on the island, despite the possibility that European Union agricultural and other funding may be adversely affecting birds and vulnerable habitats.

== Cited texts ==
- Crochet, P-A; Barthel P H; Bauer H-G; van den Berg A B; Bezzel E; Collinson J M; Dietzen C; Dubois P J; Fromholtz J; Helbig A J; Jiguet F; Jirle E; Knox A G; Krüger T; Le Maréchal P; van Loon A J; Päckert M; Parkin D T; Pons J-M; Raty L; Roselaar C S; Sangster G; Steinheimer F D; Svensson L; Tyrberg T; Votier S C; Yésou P (2011). AERC TAC's taxonomic recommendations: 2011 report (PDF). Luxembourg: AERC.
- Diamond, Anthony William (1987). Studies of Mascarene Island Birds. Cambridge: Cambridge University Press. ISBN 0-521-25808-1.
- Dunning, John Barnard (2007). CRC Handbook of Avian Body Masses (Second ed.). Boca Raton: CRC Press. ISBN 978-1-4200-6444-5.
- Gmelin, Johann Friedrich (1789). Caroli a Linné systema naturae per regna tria naturae, secundum classes, ordines, genera, species, cum characteribus, differentiis, synonymis, locis. Editio decima tertia, aucta, reformata. Tomus I. Pars II (in Latin). Lipsiae [Leipzig]: Beer.
- Jobling, James A (2010). The Helm Dictionary of Scientific Bird Names (PDF). London: Christopher Helm. ISBN 978-1-4081-2501-4.
- de Klemm, Cyrille; Lausche, Barbara J (1986). African Wildlife Laws (IUCN Environmental Policy & Law Occasional Paper; No. 3). Seiburg: World Conservation Union. ISBN 2-88032-091-7.
- Langrand, Olivier (1991). Guide to the Birds of Madagascar. New Haven: Yale University Press. ISBN 0-300-04310-4.
- Maggs, Gwen; Ladkoo, Amanda; Poongavanan, Sandra; Chowrimootoo, Aurélie; Tucker, Rachel; Mangroo, Walter; Dawson, Kimberly; Cole, Julie; Baross, Sally; Morris, Anne; Whitfield, Harriet (2009). Olive White-Eye Recovery Program Annual Report 2008–09. Vacoas: Mauritian Wildlife Foundation.
- Papazoglou, Clairie; Kreiser, Konstantin; Waliczky, Zoltán; Burfield, Ian (2004). Birds in the European Union: a status assessment (PDF). Wageningen: BirdLife International. ISBN 0-946888-56-6. Archived from the original (PDF) on 2013-06-26.
- Petit, Jérôme (2010). Prudent, Guillaume (ed.). Climate Change and Biodiversity in the European Union Overseas Entities (PDF). Gland & Brussels: International Union for Conservation of Nature. ISBN 978-2-8317-1315-1. Archived from the original (PDF) on 2013-04-20.
- Reichenow, Anton (1903). Die Vögel Afrikas: Zweiter Band (in German). Neudam: J Neuman.
- Sharpe, Richard Bowdler; Wyatt, Claude Wilmott (1894). A Monograph of the Hirundinidae: Volume 1. London: Self-published.
- Sinclair, Ian; Hockey, Phil; Tarboton, Warwick (2002). SASOL Birds of Southern Africa. Cape Town: Struik. ISBN 1-86872-721-1.
- Sinclair, Ian; Langrand, Olivier (2004). Birds of the Indian Ocean Islands: Madagascar, Mauritius, Réunion, Rodrigues, Seychelles and the Comoros. Cape Town: Struik. ISBN 1-86872-956-7.
- Stevenson, Terry; Fanshawe, John; Small, Brian; Gale, John; Arlott, Norman (2004). Birds of East Africa: Kenya, Tanzania, Uganda, Rwanda, Burundi. London: Christopher Helm. ISBN 0-7136-7347-8.
- Tarburton, Warwick (1987). Birds of the Transvaal. Pretoria: Transvaal Museum. ISBN 0-620-10006-0.
- Turner, Angela K; Rose, Chris (1989). A Handbook to the Swallows and Martins of the World. London: Christopher Helm. ISBN 0-7470-3202-5.
- Williams, John; Arlott, Norman (1980). A Field Guide to the Birds of East Africa. London: Collins. ISBN 0-00-219179-2.
- Zimmerman, Dale A; Pearson, David J; Turner, Donald A (2005). Birds of Kenya and Northern Tanzania. London: Christopher Helm. ISBN 0-7136-7550-0.
