= Mesalges =

Scientific classification
- Kingdom: Animalia
- Phylum: Arthropoda
- Subphylum: Chelicerata
- Class: Arachnida
- Order: Sarcoptiformes
- Family: Psoroptoididae
- Genus: Mesalges; Trouessart, 1888

Genus of mites

Mesalges is a genus of mites belonging to the family Psoroptoididae.

Species:

- Mesalges diaphanoxus
- Mesalges lyrurus
- Mesalges oscinum
