= Réunion cuckooshrike =

Conservation status
- Critically Endangered (IUCN 3.1)

Scientific classification
- Kingdom: Animalia
- Phylum: Chordata
- Class: Aves
- Order: Passeriformes
- Family: Campephagidae
- Genus: Lalage
- Species: L. newtoni

Binomial name
- Lalage newtoni (Pollen, 1866)
- Approximate distribution map Resident Extirpated

Synonyms
- Coracina newtoni

Species of bird

The Réunion cuckooshrike (Lalage newtoni) is a passerine bird in the cuckooshrike family. It is endemic to the island of Réunion, where it is restricted to two areas of mountain forest in the north of the island. Males are dark grey above and pale grey beneath, while females have dark brown upper parts and a streaked breast. The population has been declining and the range contracting, being currently about 16 square kilometres (6.2 sq mi), and the International Union for Conservation of Nature has rated the species as "critically endangered", with the possibility that the bird could be wiped out by a tropical storm. Conservation efforts are being made by attempting to control the cats and rats which prey on the chicks, and this seems to have resulted in the population stabilising.

== Taxonomy ==
Dutch naturalist François Pollen described the Réunion cuckooshrike in 1866.

== Description ==
The Réunion cuckooshrike is a small arboreal bird. The plumage is dimorphic between the sexes. The male is grey coloured with a darker back and lighter underside; the face is darker and has the impression of a mask. The female is quite different, being dark brown above and striped underneath with a white eye-line. The call of the species is a clear whistled tui tui tui, from which is derived its local Réunion Creole/French name, tuit-tuit.

== Distribution and habitat ==
The species is restricted to the forest canopy, with a distribution limited to two small patches of Réunion's native subtropical mountain forests in the north of the island. Although it once ranged across Réunion in suitable habitat, its stronghold is the Plaine des Chicots – Plaine d'Affouches Important Bird Area near the island capital of Saint-Denis. Its diet is principally insects, though fruit are also taken.

== Status and conservation ==
The Réunion cuckooshrike is a critically endangered species and is currently the focus of conservation efforts. Its range has declined significantly and is currently an area of just 16 km^{2}. The population of the species is currently stable but at the low number of around 50 adult birds, and is very vulnerable to localised disasters such as forest fires or habitat degradation. Introduced cats and rats prey on the species (particularly on young birds), and introduced herbivores such as deer degrade what little habitat remains.

Formerly classified as an endangered species by the IUCN, it was suspected to be rarer than generally assumed. Following the evaluation of its status, this was found to be correct, and it is consequently uplisted to critically endangered status in 2008 as it is in immediate danger of extinction, numbering so few birds that it might be entirely wiped out by a single catastrophic event such as a tropical cyclone.

Pilot studies have shown that controlling rat and cat numbers around nesting sites leads to increased survival of chicks, and the test programme of trapping and poisoning is going to be expanded. The species' survival plan also includes recommendations to translocate some individuals to suitable habitat in other parts of the island.
