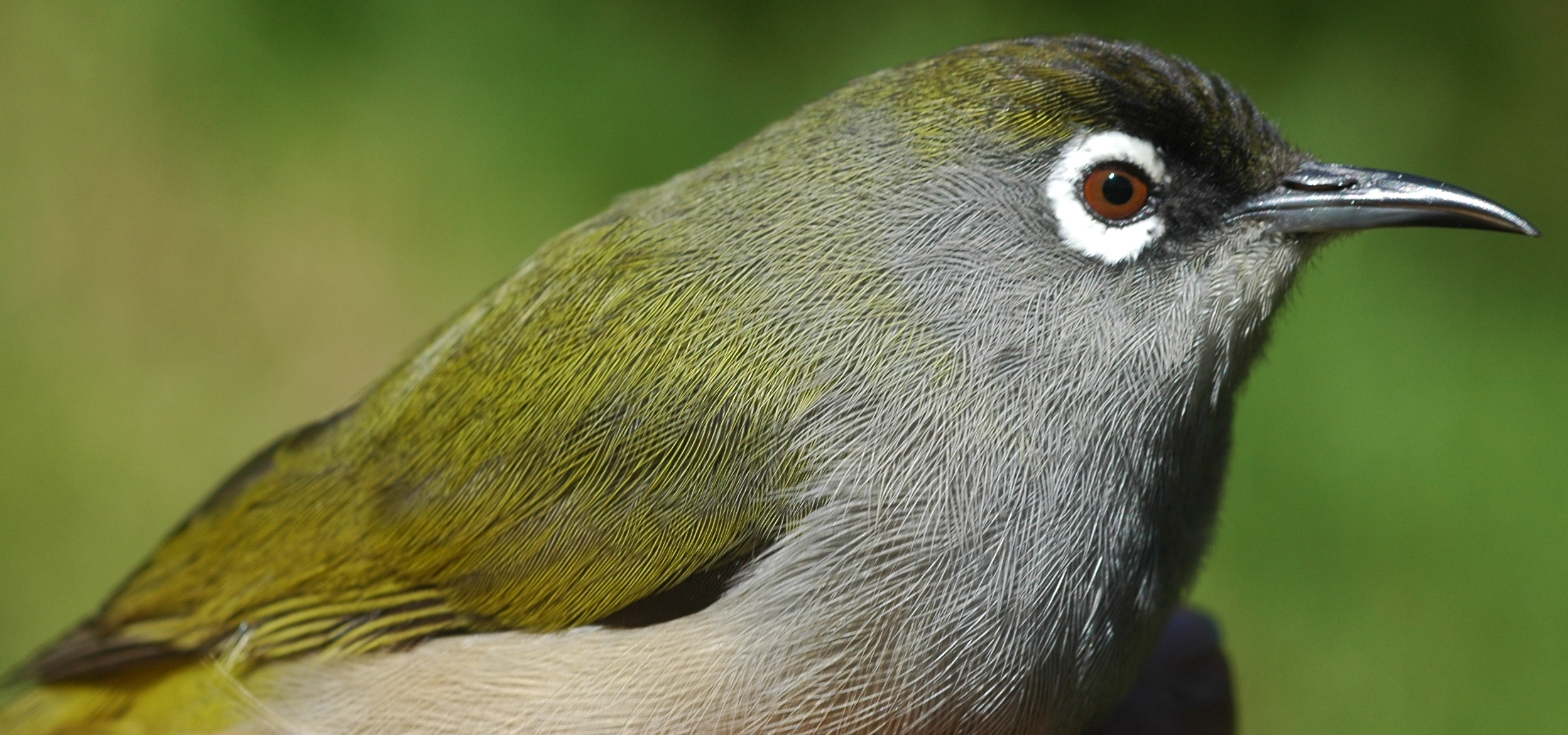

Conservation status
- Least Concern (IUCN 3.1)

Scientific classification
- Kingdom: Animalia
- Phylum: Chordata
- Class: Aves
- Order: Passeriformes
- Family: Zosteropidae
- Genus: Zosterops
- Species: Z. olivaceus

Binomial name
- Zosterops olivaceus (Linnaeus, 1766)

Synonyms
- Certhia olivacea Linnaeus, 1766

= Réunion olive white-eye =

Species of bird

The Réunion olive white-eye (Zosterops olivaceus) is a species of bird in the family Zosteropidae. It is found on Réunion. Its natural habitats are boreal forests and subtropical or tropical high-altitude grassland.

== Description ==
like the name suggests the bird is olive green on the back and yellow on the rump, gray on the belly and black on the head. Its eye is surrounded by a circle of white feathers. The male and female are undifferentiated.

== Habitat ==
This bird lives in, between 500 and 2,500 meters. It is frequently found in the Réunion National Park or in the Bélouve forest. He likes places where the yellow flower tree "Hypericum lanceolatum" grow. Its thin, slightly curved beak allows it to reach the nectar of flowers.

== Behavior ==
The green bird is always on the move. It has difficulty supporting the presence of conspecifics and can be aggressive.

== Diet ==
The green bird is mainly nectarivorous but it also feeds on fruit pulp and insects.

== Breeding ==
Breeding takes place from June/July to January. The female lays 2 to 3 eggs in a cup-shaped nest made of twigs, down and moss. Several couples can live together in the same nest, taking turns brooding the broods of their roommates.

== History ==
In 1760 the French zoologist Mathurin Jacques Brisson included a description of the Reunion olive white-eye in his Ornithologie based on a specimen that had been brought to Paris from Île Bourbon (now Réunion), but which Brisson mistakenly believed had been collected in Madagascar. He used the French name Le grimpereau olive de Madagascar and the Latin Certhia Madagascariensis Olivaceus. Although Brisson coined Latin names, these do not conform to the binomial system and are not recognised by the International Commission on Zoological Nomenclature. When in 1766 the Swedish naturalist Carl Linnaeus updated his Systema Naturae for the twelfth edition, he added 240 species that had been previously described by Brisson. One of these was the Reunion olive white-eye. Linnaeus included a brief description, coined the binomial name Certhia olivacea and cited Brisson's work. He followed Brisson and gave the type location as Madagascar instead of Réunion. This species is now placed in the genus Zosterops that was introduced by the naturalists Nicholas Vigors and Thomas Horsfield in 1827. There are no recognised subspecies.

== Annexe ==
=== Informations complémentaires ===
- List of bird species in Reunion Island.
- Endemic fauna of Reunion Island
