= 2024 Summer Olympics torch relay =

- Host city: Paris, France
- Countries visited: Greece, France and Monaco
- Start date: 16 April 2024
- End date: 26 July 2024

The 2024 Summer Olympic torch relay ran from 16 April 2024 until 26 July 2024. After it was lit in Olympia, Greece, the torch then travelled through Greece, arriving at Athens on 26 April. It sailed across the Mediterranean on the three-masted barque Belem to Marseille on 9 May and subsequently began its travel across Metropolitan and Overseas France, as well as Monaco. The French leg ended during the opening ceremony when it was used to light the Olympic cauldron. The cauldron was erected at the Tuileries Garden's central fountain.

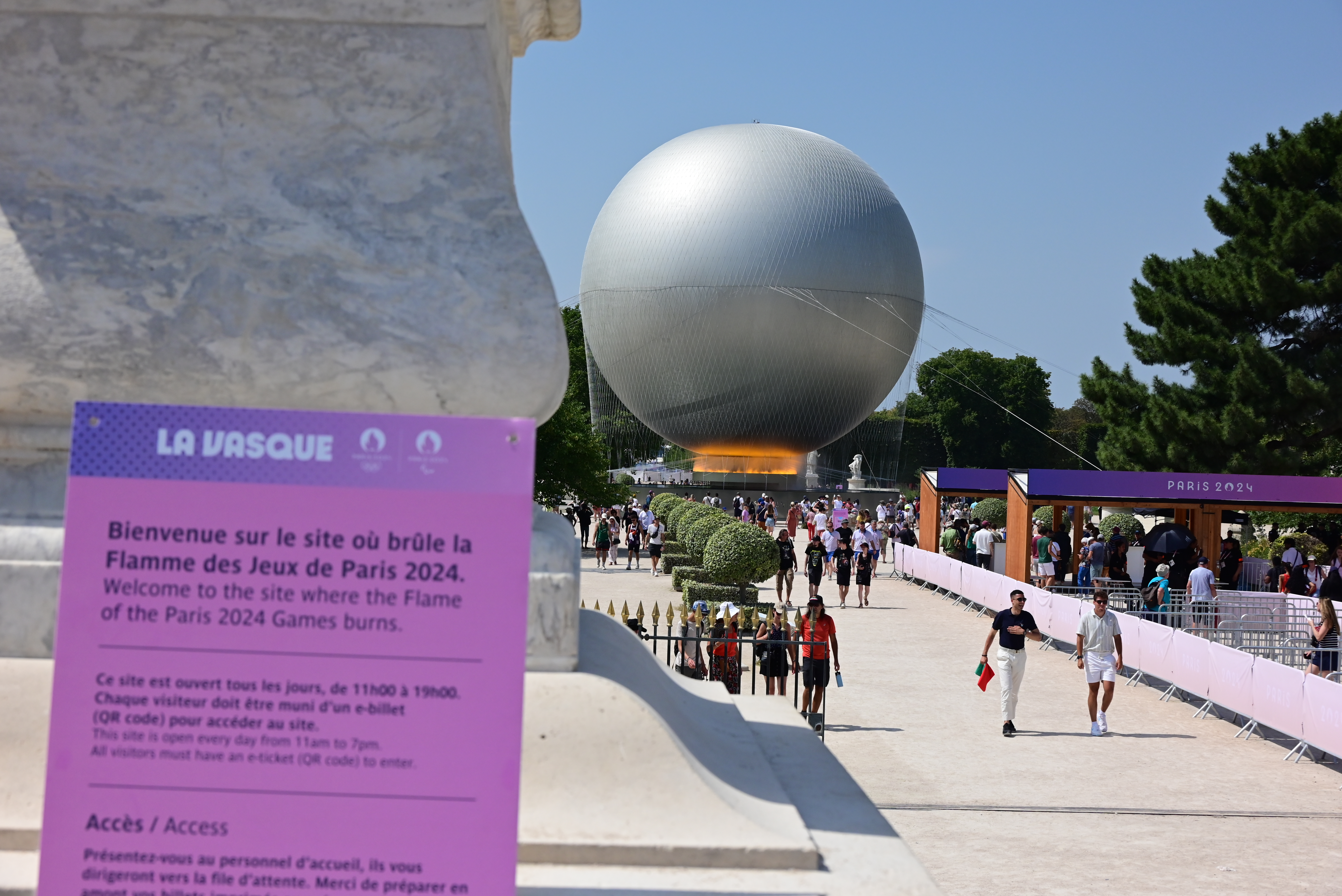
Site of Olympic Cauldron 2024, Jardin des Tuileries in Paris.

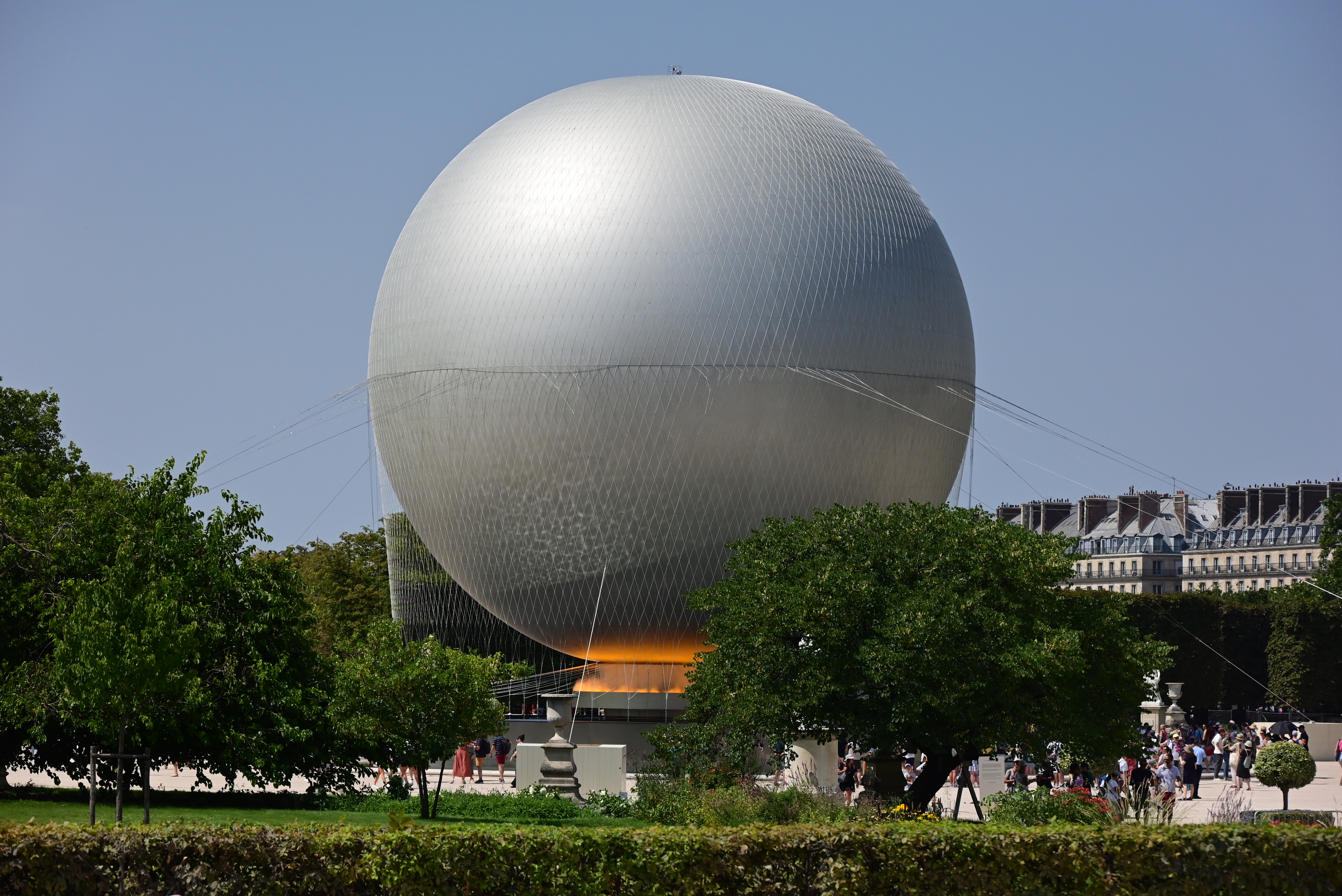
Olympic Cauldron 2024, Jardin des Tuileries in Paris.

== Route in Greece ==
The flame was lit in Olympia on 16 April and travelled across Greece before arriving in Athens on 26 April.

16 April 2024
1. Olympia
2. Amaliada
3. Elis
4. Gastouni
5. Pyrgos
6. Zacharo
7. Filiatra
8. Pylos

17 April 2024
1. Pylos
2. Methoni
3. Koroni
4. Tripoli
5. Mycenae
6. Nafplio
7. Piraeus
8. Port of Piraeus

18 April 2024
1. Kastellorizo
2. Agios Nikolaos
3. Knossos
4. Heraklion
5. Rethymno
6. Chania

19 April 2024
1. Port of Piraeus
2. Athens International Airport
3. Santorini
4. Naxos
5. Paros
6. Piraeus
7. Acropolis of Athens

20 April 2024
1. Acropolis of Athens
2. Delphi
3. Lamia
4. Volos

21 April 2024
1. Larissa
2. Trikala
3. Kalabaka
4. Toumba
5. Thessaloniki Olympic Museum
6. Thessaloniki

22 April 2024
1. Thessaloniki
2. Philippi
3. Kavala
4. Xanthi
5. Komotini
6. Alexandroupolis

23 April 2024
1. Alexandroupolis
2. Eleftheroupoli
3. Veria
4. Vergina
5. Adgae
6. Ioannina

24 April 2024
1. Ioannina
2. University of Ioannina
3. Igoumenitsa
4. Corfu

25 April 2024
1. Corfu
2. Missolonghi
3. Rio–Antirrio Bridge
4. Spiti Palama
5. University of Patras
6. Patras
7. Corinth

26 April 2024
1. Corinth
2. Megara
3. Marathon
4. Sounion
5. Athens
6. Panathenaic Stadium

== Route in France and Monaco ==
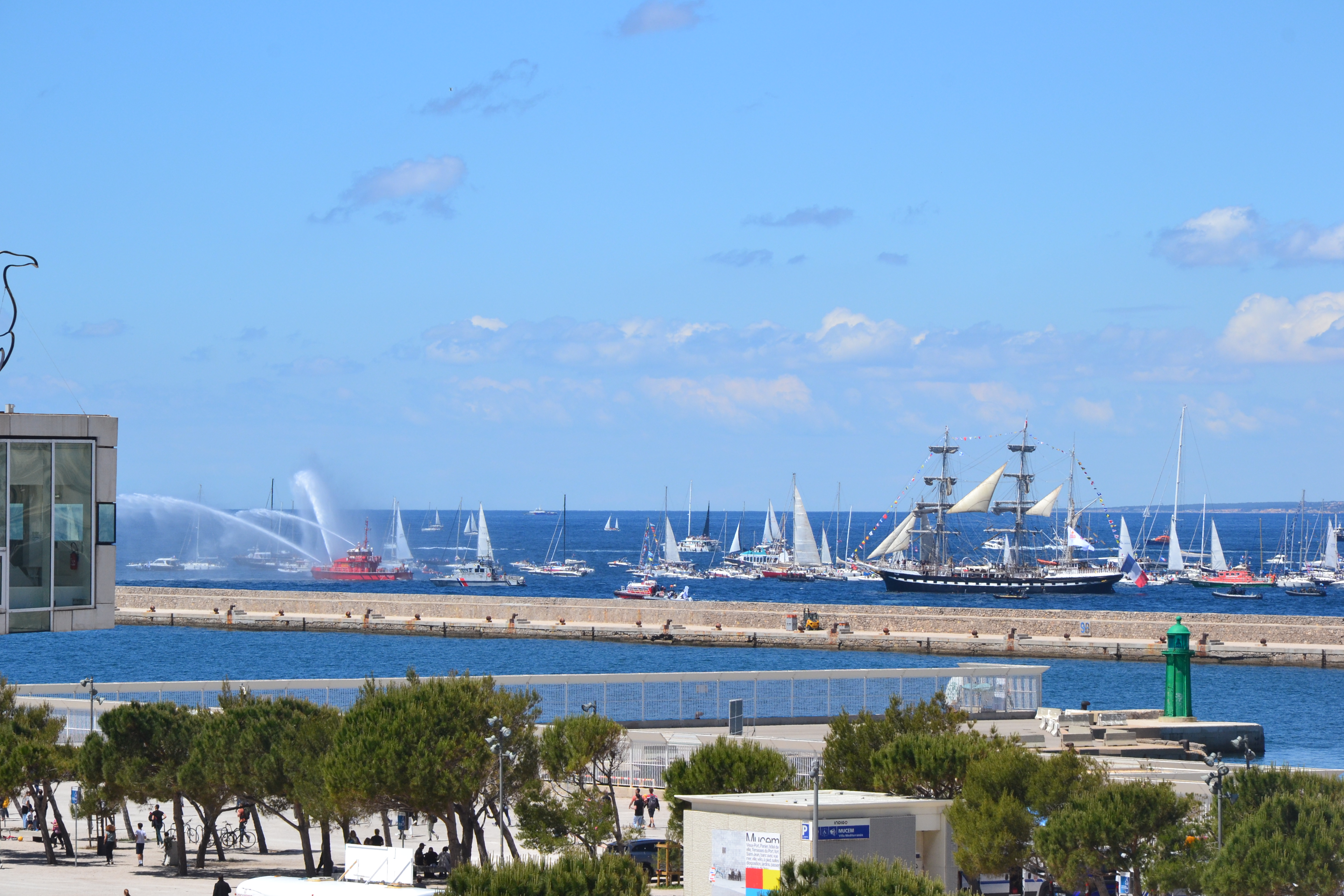
Belem arriving in Marseille

Route in Metropolitan France

Each day, the relay covered a different part of France. Several French cities and towns received the flame, as well as one or two iconic places, such as historical places or natural landmarks. One or two team relays also took place: 24 participants, led by a captain and representing an Olympic or Paralympic French sports federation, carried the flame together for a leg. Each daily relay ended in a stage town, where a mini-cauldron was lit and celebrations took place. This list also included a stopover in Monaco, as well as the June 11 leg scheduled for Nouméa, New Caledonia which was cancelled due to the 2024 New Caledonia unrest.

=== Metropolitan leg (Part 1) ===
Territory	Route	Map
Marseille	8 May 2024 (prologue): Marseille 9 May 2024 (day 1): Marseille: Notre-Dame de la Garde; Parc Borély; Palais du Pharo; Lettres Marseille; Palais du Pharo; Cité Internationale de Marseille (Cité scolaire internationale Jacques Chirac); Parc de Font Obscure; Le Dôme de Marseille; Palais Longchamp; Parc de la Moline; Périer; Marseille Stadium	2024 Summer Olympics torch relay is located in Provence-Alpes-Côte d'Azur
Var	10 May 2024 (day 2): Toulon: Saint-Raphaël; Hyères; Brignoles; Flassans-sur-Issole; La Sayne-sur-Mer; Les Salles-sur-Verdon; Place de la Liberté	2024 Summer Olympics torch relay is located in Provence-Alpes-Côte d'Azur
Alpes-de-Haute-Provence	11 May 2024 (day 3): Manosque: Barcelonnette; Moustiers-Sainte-Marie; Sisteron (Citadel of Sisteron); Digne-les-Bains; Colmars-les-Alpes; Forcalquier; Regional natural reserve of Verdon; Barcelonnette; Manosque	2024 Summer Olympics torch relay is located in Provence-Alpes-Côte d'Azur
Bouches-du-Rhône	12 May 2024 (day 4): Arles: Aix-en-Provence; Cassis; Eygalières; Istres; Miramas; Port-Saint-Louis-du-Rhône; Arles Amphitheatre; Arles	2024 Summer Olympics torch relay is located in Provence-Alpes-Côte d'Azur
Millau – Sète – Montpellier	13 May 2024 (day 5): Montpellier: Millau; Sète; Millau Viaduct; Montpellier Triumphal Arch; Montpellier	2024 Summer Olympics torch relay is located in Occitanie
Corsica	14 May 2024 (day 6): Bastia: Ajaccio; Corte; L'Île-Rousse; Porto-Vecchio; Valle-d'Orezza; Zonza; Aiguilles de Bavella; Bastia	2024 Summer Olympics torch relay is located in Corsica
Pyrénées-Orientales	15 May 2024 (day 7): Perpignan: Collioure; Céret; Font-Romeu-Odeillo-Via (National altitude training center); Port-Vendres; Prades; Villeneuve-de-la-Raho; Canigou; Perpignan	2024 Summer Olympics torch relay is located in Occitanie
Aude	16 May 2024 (day 8): Carcassonne: Castelnaudary; Duilhac-sous-Peyrepertuse; Gruissan (Plage des Chalets); Lagrasse; Limoux; Narbonne; Cité de Carcassonne; Carcassonne	2024 Summer Olympics torch relay is located in Occitanie
Haute-Garonne	17 May 2024 (day 9): Toulouse: Colomiers; Muret; Revel (Halle de Revel); Rieux-Volvestre; Saint-Aventin; Villemur-sur-Tarn; Toulouse	2024 Summer Olympics torch relay is located in Occitanie
Gers	18 May 2024 (day 10): Auch: Condom (Statues of Dumas' Musketeers); Fleurance; L'Isle-Jourdain; Marciac; Mirande; Nogaro; Auch	2024 Summer Olympics torch relay is located in Occitanie
Hautes-Pyrénées	19 May 2024 (day 11): Tarbes: Bagnères-de-Bigorre; Lannemezan; Lourdes; Cirque de Gavarnie; Pic du Midi de Bigorre; Tarbes	2024 Summer Olympics torch relay is located in Occitanie
Pyrénées-Atlantiques	20 May 2024 (day 12): Pau: Anglet; Arette; Bayonne; Biarritz (Beaches of Biarritz); Hasparren; Orthez; Saint-Jean-de-Luz; Pau-Pyrénées Whitewater Stadium; Pau	2024 Summer Olympics torch relay is located in Nouvelle-Aquitaine
Dordogne	22 May 2024 (day 13): Périgueux: Agonac; Bergerac; Montignac-Lascaux; Nontron; Saint-Aulaye-Puymangou; Sarlat-la-Canéda; Dordogne basin; Lascaux; Périgueux	2024 Summer Olympics torch relay is located in Nouvelle-Aquitaine
Bordeaux and Libournais	23 May 2024 (day 14): Bordeaux: Le Bouscat; Libourne; Lormont; Mérignac; Pessac; Saint-Émilion vineyard; Cité du Vin; Bordeaux	2024 Summer Olympics torch relay is located in Nouvelle-Aquitaine
Charente	24 May 2024 (day 15): Angoulême: Barbezieux-Saint-Hilaire; Cognac; Condac; Confolens; Eymouthiers; Ruffec; Saint-Cybardeaux; Comic Strip museum; Angoulême	2024 Summer Olympics torch relay is located in Nouvelle-Aquitaine
Vienne	25 May 2024 (day 16): Grand Poitiers-Futuroscope: Charroux; Château-Larcher; Châtellerault; Loudun; Montmorillon; Neuville-de-Poitou; Poitiers (Palace of Poitiers); Grand Poitiers-Futuroscope	2024 Summer Olympics torch relay is located in Nouvelle-Aquitaine
Indre	27 May 2024 (day 17): Châteauroux: Buzançais; Cuzion; Déols; Issoudun; La Châtre; Le Blanc; Valençay (Château de Valençay); Châteauroux	2024 Summer Olympics torch relay is located in Centre-Val de Loire
Maine-et-Loire	28 May 2024 (day 18): Angers: Baugé-en-Anjou; Chaudefonds-sur-Layon; La Romagne; Le Lion-d'Angers; Montsoreau (Château de Montsoreau); Saint-Florent-le-Vieil; Coteaux du Layon vineyard; Angers	2024 Summer Olympics torch relay is located in Pays de la Loire
Mayenne	29 May 2024 (day 19): Laval: Chailland; Château-Gontier-sur-Mayenne; Cossé-le-Vivien; Mayenne; Pré-en-Pail-Saint-Samson; Sainte-Suzanne-et-Chammes (Medieval citadel); Laval	2024 Summer Olympics torch relay is located in Pays de la Loire
Calvados	30 May 2024 (day 20): Caen: Bayeux; Cabourg; Dives-sur-Mer; Falaise; Honfleur; Houlgate; Lisieux; Omaha Beach and D-Day beaches; Caen	2024 Summer Olympics torch relay is located in Normandy
Manche	31 May 2024 (day 21): Mont-Saint-Michel: Cherbourg-en-Cotentin; Granville; Saint-Lô; Saint-Vaast-la-Hougue; Sainte-Mère-Église; Villedieu-les-Poêles-Rouffigny; Mont-Saint-Michel	2024 Summer Olympics torch relay is located in Normandy
Ille-et-Vilaine	1 June 2024 (day 22): Rennes: Cesson-Sévigné; Feins; Fougères; Paimpont (Paimpont forest); Saint-Just; Saint-Malo; Vitré; Rennes	2024 Summer Olympics torch relay is located in Brittany
Deux-Sèvres	2 June 2024 (day 23): Niort: Bressuire; Celles-sur-Belle; Coulon (Marais Poitevin); Parthenay; Saint-Maixent-l'École; Thouars; Niort	2024 Summer Olympics torch relay is located in Nouvelle-Aquitaine
Vendée	4 June 2024 (day 24): Les Sables-d'Olonne: Fontenay-le-Comte; La Pointe d'Arçay; La Roche-sur-Yon; Montaigu-Vendée; Passage du Gois; Puy du Fou; Les Sables-d'Olonne	2024 Summer Olympics torch relay is located in Pays de la Loire
Between Loire and Atlantique	5 June 2024 (day 25): La Baule: Basse-Goulaine; Ingrandes-le-Fresne-sur-Loire; Ligné; Saint-Sébastien-sur-Loire; Vallons-de-l'Erdre; Vertou; La Baule Bay; La Baule-Escoublac	2024 Summer Olympics torch relay is located in Pays de la Loire
Morbihan	6 June 2024 (day 26): Vannes: Josselin; Lorient (Cité de la voile Éric Tabarly); Pontivy; Rochefort-en-Terre; Sainte-Anne-d'Auray; Île-aux-Moines; Vannes	2024 Summer Olympics torch relay is located in Brittany
Finistère	7 June 2024 (day 27): Brest: Mont Saint-Michel de Brasparts; Plougastel-Daoulas; Pointe de la Torche; Pointe du Raz; Port-la-Forêt; Quimper; Brest	2024 Summer Olympics torch relay is located in Brittany

=== Overseas France leg ===
Territory	Route	Map
French Guiana	9 June 2024 (day 28): Cayenne: Camopi (Oyapock); Kourou (Guiana Space Centre); Macouria; Matoury; Saint-Georges; Saint-Laurent-du-Maroni; Cayenne	2024 Summer Olympics torch relay is located in French Guiana
New Caledonia	11 June 2024 (day 29): Noumea: L'Île-des-Pins; Bourail (Gouaro Deva); Nouméa (Anse Vata)	2024 Summer Olympics torch relay is located in New Caledonia
Réunion	12 June 2024 (day 30): Saint-Denis: Le Tampon; Saint-Benoît; Saint-Paul; Saint-Pierre; Sainte-Suzanne; Cité du Volcan; Plaine des Sables; Pointe de Langevin; Saint-Denis	2024 Summer Olympics torch relay is located in Réunion
French Polynesia	13 June 2024 (day 31): Papeete: Teahupo'o; Papeete	2024 Summer Olympics torch relay is located in French Polynesia
Guadeloupe	15 June 2024 (day 32): Baie-Mahault: Basse-Terre; Le Moule; Les Abymes; Petit-Canal; Pointe-à-Pitre (Mémorial ACTe); Baie-Mahault	2024 Summer Olympics torch relay is located in Guadeloupe
Martinique	17 June 2024 (day 33): Fort-de-France: Le Diamant; Le Lamentin; Le Robert; Saint-Esprit; Saint-Pierre (Mount Pelée); Sainte-Marie; Schœlcher; Fort-de-France	2024 Summer Olympics torch relay is located in Martinique

=== Metropolitan leg (Part 2) ===
Territory	Route	Map
Alpes-Maritimes and Monaco	18 June 2024 (day 34): Nice: Antibes; Cannes (Palais des Festivals et des Congrès); Grasse; Juan-les-Pins; Valberg; Valdeblore (Col de la Colmiane); Villefranche-sur-Mer; Monaco (Place du Palais); Nice	2024 Summer Olympics torch relay is located in Provence-Alpes-Côte d'Azur
Vaucluse	19 June 2024 (day 35): Avignon: Apt; French Colorado; L'Isle-sur-la-Sorgue; Orange (Roman Theatre of Orange); Sorgues; Mont Ventoux; Avignon	2024 Summer Olympics torch relay is located in Provence-Alpes-Côte d'Azur
Drôme	20 June 2024 (day 36): Valence: Bourg-de-Péage; Dieulefit; Hauterives; Montélimar; Pierrelatte; Romans-sur-Isère; Castle of Grignan; Valence	2024 Summer Olympics torch relay is located in Auvergne-Rhône-Alpes
Vichy	21 June 2024 (day 37): Vichy: Cusset; Le Mayet-de-Montagne; Saint-Germain-des-Fossés; Saint-Yorre; Vichy Centre for Sports Resources, Expertise end Performance; Vichy	2024 Summer Olympics torch relay is located in Auvergne-Rhône-Alpes
Loire	22 June 2024 (day 38): Saint-Étienne: Charlieu; Feurs; Firminy (Maison de la Culture de Firminy); Montbrison; Roanne; Saint-Chamond; Stade Geoffroy-Guichard; Saint-Étienne	2024 Summer Olympics torch relay is located in Auvergne-Rhône-Alpes
Haute-Savoie	23 June 2024 (day 39): Chamonix: Annemasse; Cluses; Excenevex; Glières plateau; Héry-sur-Alby; Évian-les-Bains; Lake Annecy; Chamonix-Mont-Blanc	2024 Summer Olympics torch relay is located in Auvergne-Rhône-Alpes
Doubs	25 June 2024 (day 40): Besançon: Baume-les-Dames; Chaux-Neuve (Chaux-Neuve jumping hills); Maîche; Montbéliard; Pontarlier; Étalans; Besançon	2024 Summer Olympics torch relay is located in Bourgogne-Franche-Comté
European Collectivity of Alsace	26 June 2024 (day 41): Strasbourg: Colmar; Huningue (Three Countries Bridge); Lembach; Marckolsheim; Mulhouse; Saverne; Strasbourg	2024 Summer Olympics torch relay is located in Grand Est
Moselle	27 June 2024 (day 42): Metz: Forbach; Meisenthal (Verrerie de Meisenthal); Sarreguemines; Scy-Chazelles (Robert Schumann House); Thonville; Tripoint France-Germany-Luxembourg; Yutz; Metz	2024 Summer Olympics torch relay is located in Grand Est
Haute-Marne	28 June 2024 (day 43): Saint-Dizier: Bourbonne-les-Bains; Chaumont-la-Ville; Colombey-les-Deux-Églises (Mémorial Charles-de-Gaulle); Froncles; Langres; Nogent; Saint-Dizier	2024 Summer Olympics torch relay is located in Grand Est
Meuse	29 June 2024 (day 44): Verdun: Bar-le-Duc; Commercy; Gondrecourt-le-Château; Lac de Madine; Montmédy (Montmédy citadel); Verdun Memorial; Verdun	2024 Summer Olympics torch relay is located in Grand Est
Marne	30 June 2024 (day 45): Reims: Châlons-en-Champagne; Giffaumont-Champaubert; Sainte-Menehould; Sézanne; Vitry-le-François; Épernay (Avenue de Champagne); Reims	2024 Summer Olympics torch relay is located in Grand Est
Nord	2 July 2024 (day 46): Lille: Avesnes-sur-Helpe; Cambrai; Douai; Dunkerque; Roubaix; Tourcoing; Wallers (Trouée d'Arenberg); Lille	2024 Summer Olympics torch relay is located in Hauts-de-France
Pas-de-Calais	3 July 2024 (day 47): Lens-Liévin: Arras; Berck; Boulogne-sur-Mer; Calais; Maisnil-lès-Ruitz; Saint-Omer; Louvre-Lens; Stade Bollaert-Delelis; Lens-Liévin	2024 Summer Olympics torch relay is located in Hauts-de-France
Somme	4 July 2024 (day 48): Amiens: Abbeville; Albert; Doullens; La Chaussée-Tirancourt; Saint-Valery-sur-Somme; Villers-Bretonneux; Baie de Somme; Amiens	2024 Summer Olympics torch relay is located in Hauts-de-France
Seine-Maritime	5 July 2024 (day 49): Le Havre: Dieppe; Jumièges; Mirville; Rouen (Rouen Cathedral); Yvetot; Étretat; Le Havre	2024 Summer Olympics torch relay is located in Normandy
Eure	6 July 2024 (day 50): Vernon: Bernay; Gisors; Pont-Audemer; Val-de-Reuil; Verneuil d'Avre et d'Iton; Évreux; Vernon	2024 Summer Olympics torch relay is located in Normandy
C'Chartres	7 July 2024 (day 51): Chartres: Bonneval; Châteaudun; Dreux (Chapelle royale de Dreux); Chartres	2024 Summer Olympics torch relay is located in Centre-Val de Loire
Loir-et-Cher	8 July 2024 (day 52): Blois: Chaumont-sur-Loire; Fréteval; Romorantin-Lanthenay; Thésée; Vendôme; Château de Chambord; Blois	2024 Summer Olympics torch relay is located in Centre-Val de Loire
Loiret	10 July 2024 (day 53): Orléans: Gien; Le Malesherbois; Meung-sur-Loire; Montargis; Neuville-aux-Bois; Sully-sur-Loire (Château de Sully-sur-Loire); Joan of Arc House; Orléans	2024 Summer Olympics torch relay is located in Centre-Val de Loire
Yonne	11 July 2024 (day 54): Auxerre: Avallon; Chablis; Migennes; Saint-Fargeau; Sens; Vézelay; Vignoble de Chablis; Auxerre	2024 Summer Olympics torch relay is located in Bourgogne-Franche-Comté
Côte-d'Or	12 July 2024 (day 55): Dijon: Alise-Sainte-Reine (Alesia archaeological site); Beaune; Saint-Jean-de-Losne; Saulieu; Semur-en-Auxois; Clos de Vougeot; Dijon	2024 Summer Olympics torch relay is located in Bourgogne-Franche-Comté
Aube	13 July 2024 (day 56): Troyes: Dolancourt; Ervy-le-Châtel; Mesnil-Saint-Père; Nogent-sur-Seine; Romilly-sur-Seine; Ville-sous-la-Ferté; Lake of Orient; Troyes	2024 Summer Olympics torch relay is located in Grand Est

=== 14 and 15 July Special Legs ===

14 July 2024
1. Champs-Élysées
2. Palais Bourbon (National Assembly)
3. Saint-Germain-des-Prés
4. Luxembourg Palace (Senate)–Jardin du Luxembourg
5. Panthéon
6. Latin Quarter–University of Paris (Sorbonne)
7. Institut du Monde Arabe
8. Notre-Dame de Paris
9. Mémorial de la Shoah–Le Mur des Justes
10. Musée Carnavalet
11. Maison de Victor Hugo
12. Place de la Bastille
13. Bataclan
14. Place de la République
15. Place du Colonel Fabien
16. Olympia
17. Rue de Rivoli
18. Louvre
19. Hôtel de Ville
15 July 2024
20. Bois de Vincennes – INSEP
21. Porte de la Chapelle
22. Goutte d'Or
23. Butte Montmartre
24. Statues of La Mulâtresse Solitude and Alexandre Dumas
25. Arc de Triomphe
26. Bois de Boulogne (Louis Vuitton Foundation)
27. Court Simonne Mathieu – Stade Roland Garros
28. Elevated railway in front of the Eiffel Tower
29. Jardin mémorial des enfants du Vél' d'Hiv'
30. Place de Catalogne
31. Butte-aux-Cailles
32. Street art open-air museum
33. Place de la Bastille
34. Buttes Chaumont
35. Belleville
36. Place de la République

=== Metropolitan leg (Part 3) ===
Territory	Route	Map
Aisne	17 July 2024 (day 59): Saint-Quentin: Château-Thierry; Guise (Guise familistère); Laon; Monampteuil; Soissons; Villers-Cotterêts (Cité internationale de la langue française); Saint-Quentin	2024 Summer Olympics torch relay is located in Hauts-de-France
Oise	18 July 2024 (day 60): Beauvais: Breteuil; Chantilly (Château de Chantilly); Chiry-Ourscamp; Compiègne; Creil; Gerberoy; Beauvais	2024 Summer Olympics torch relay is located in Hauts-de-France
Val-d'Oise	19 July 2024 (day 61): Soisy-sous-Montmorency: Argenteuil; Auvers-sur-Oise; Cergy; Cormeilles-en-Parisis; Deuil-la-Barre; Eaubonne; Enghien-les-Bains; Ermont; Franconville; Garges-lès-Gonesse; Méry-sur-Oise; Pontoise; Saint-Gratien; Saint-Prix; Sannois; Sarcelles; Théméricourt; Soisy-sous-Montmorency	2024 Summer Olympics torch relay is located in Île-de-France (region)
Seine-et-Marne	20 July 2024 (day 62): Meaux: Brou-sur-Chantereine; Chelles; Fontainebleau (Palace of Fontainebleau); Lagny-sur-Marne; Melun; Pontault-Combault; Provins; Saint-Thibault-des-Vignes; Torcy; Vaires-sur-Marne; Meaux	2024 Summer Olympics torch relay is located in Île-de-France (region)
Val-de-Marne	21 July 2024 (day 63): Créteil: Brou-sur-Chantereine; Champigny-sur-Marne; Chennevières-sur-Marne; Fontenay-sous-Bois; Joinville-le-Pont; Maisons-Alfort; Nogent-sur-Marne; Orly; Ormesson-sur-Marne; Rungis (Rungis International Market); Saint-Maur-des-Fossés; Villejuif; Vincennes; Vitry-sur-Seine; Créteil	2024 Summer Olympics torch relay is located in Île-de-France (region)
Essonne	22 July 2024 (day 64): Évry-Courcouronnes: Chamarande; Dourdan; Draveil; Étampes; Marcoussis (National Rugby Centre); Massy; Montgeron; Palaiseau; Vigneux-sur-Seine; Évry-Courcouronnes	2024 Summer Olympics torch relay is located in Île-de-France (region)
Yvelines	23 July 2024 (day 65): Versailles: Les Mureaux; Mantes-la-Ville; Poissy; Rambouillet; Saint-Germain-en-Laye; Saint-Quentin-en-Yvelines (Le Golf National); Saint-Rémy-lès-Chevreuse; Palace of Versailles; Versailles	2024 Summer Olympics torch relay is located in Île-de-France (region)
Hauts-de-Seine	24 July 2024 (day 66): Nanterre: Asnières-sur-Seine; Boulogne-Billancourt; Châtenay-Malabry; Clamart; Colombes (Stade Yves-du-Manoir); Courbevoie; Gennevilliers; Issy-les-Moulineaux; La Garenne-Colombes; Le Plessis-Robinson; Marnes-la-Coquette (Haras de Jardy); Meudon; Rueil-Malmaison; Sceaux; Suresnes; Sèvres; Vaucresson; Nanterre	2024 Summer Olympics torch relay is located in Île-de-France (region)
Seine-Saint-Denis	25 July 2024 (day 67): La Courneuve: Aubervilliers; Aulnay-sous-Bois; Bagnolet; Bobigny; Bondy; Drancy; Les Lilas; Les Pavillons-sous-Bois; Livry-Gargan; Montreuil; Neuilly-sur-Marne; Noisy-le-Grand; Noisy-le-Sec; Pantin; Pierrefitte-sur-Seine; Romainville; Sevran; Stains; Tremblay-en-France; Canal de l'Ourcq; Paris Aquatic Centre; La Courneuve	2024 Summer Olympics torch relay is located in Île-de-France (region)

=== Opening Ceremony Leg ===

Pre-opening ceremony
1. Olympic Village
2. Canal Saint-Denis
3. Paris Aquatic Centre
4. Club France
Opening ceremony
5. Stade de France
6. Nation station
7. Catacombs of Paris
8. Paris sewers
9. Pont d'Austerlitz
10. Pont Saint-Louis
11. Notre-Dame de Paris
12. Louis Vuitton headquarters
13. Pont Neuf
