= Rangipo Desert =

Geographic feature in New Zealand

Rangipo Desert Te Onetapu (Māori)
- Volcanic desert
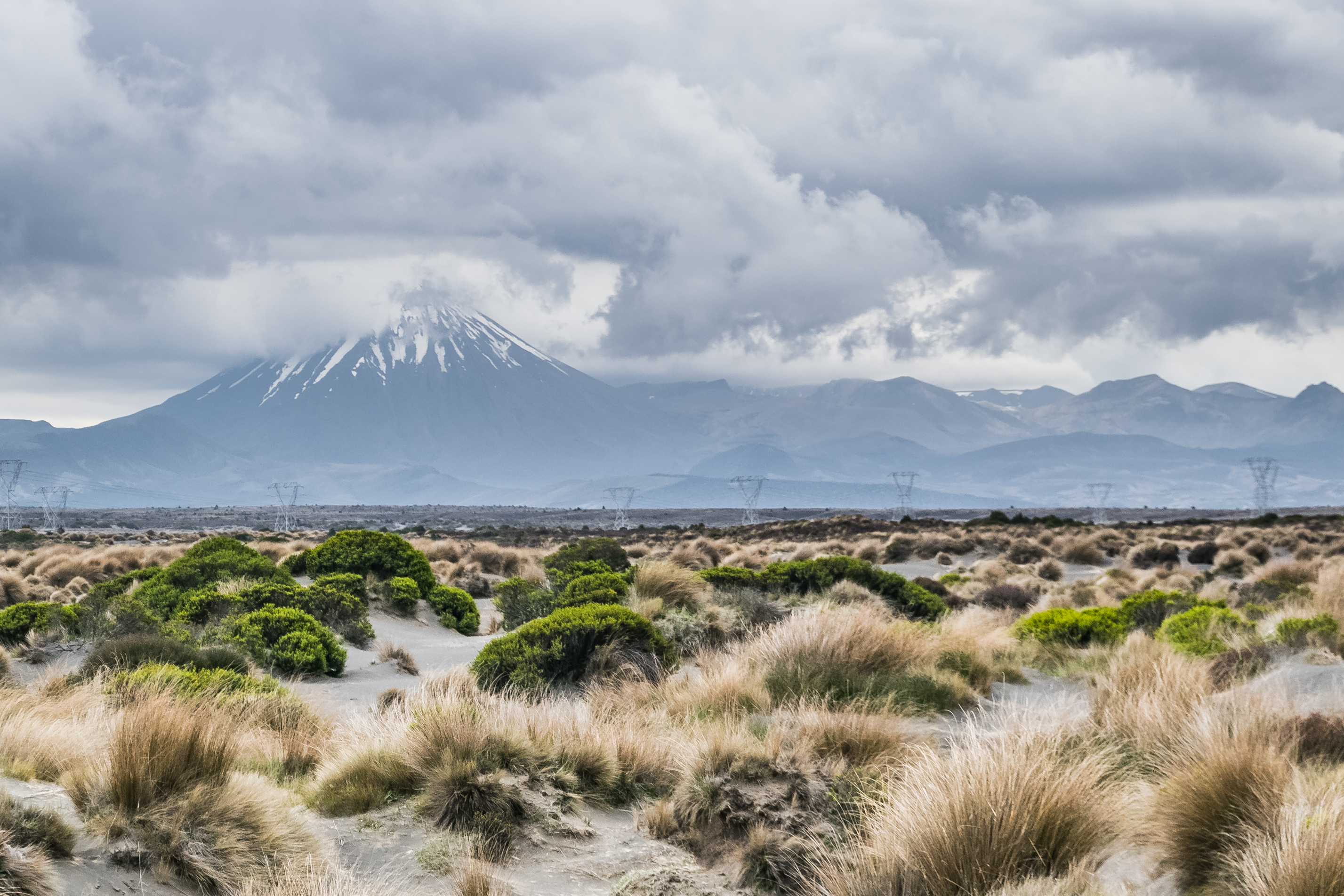
- The Rangipo Desert, with Mount Ngauruhoe and the Tongariro Massif in the background

- Location of the Rangipo Desert in New Zealand
- Interactive map of Rangipo Desert
- Coordinates: 39.312°S 175.675°E
- Location: Ruapehu District, New Zealand
- Part of: North Island Volcanic Plateau
- Formed by: Volcanic eruptions and ashfall
- Etymology: Te Onetapu translates from Māori as "The sacred sand", referencing the killing of Taiteariki. Rangipo translates as "Place where the sky is dark", referencing ash clouds from nearby volcanoes.
- Defining authority: New Zealand Geographic Board

Area
  - Total: 100 km^{2} (39 sq mi)
- Volcanic arc: Taupō Volcanic Zone
- Topo map: NZTopo50-BJ35 306452

Te Onetapu (Māori: [tɛˌɔnɛˈtaˌpʉ]), commonly known as the Rangipo Desert (Māori: [ˌɾaŋiˌpɔː]), is a barren desert-like environment located in New Zealand, located in the Ruapehu District on the North Island Volcanic Plateau; to the east of the three active peaks of Mount Tongariro, Mount Ngauruhoe, and Mount Ruapehu, and to the west of the Kaimanawa Range.

== Etymology ==
Two main names have been given to the desert, both of which are derived from te reo Māori and describe the area's history. The first of these, Te Onetapu, is derived from the words one - beach or sand, and tapu - sacred. This name refers to the death of Taiteariki, an ancestor of the Ngāti Rangi iwi who was killed at a location in the desert in early Māori history after conflict arose between him and two children of Houmea, Tura and Rotuia.

Following Pākehā settlement and expansion into the region, the desert became known as Rangipo, from the Māori words rangi, meaning sky, and pō, meaning night or darkness. This name references the story of Ngātoro-i-rangi, a tohunga and ancestor of Ngāti Tūwharetoa who explored the region in search of land for his people. According to legend, Ngātoro-i-rangi saw explorers from the Tākitimu waka while camping on Mount Tongariro, and pleaded to Ruaumoko for help defending the area from the encroachment. Ruaumoko responded by causing Mount Ngauruhoe to erupt, darkening the sky and enveloping the new party in smoke and ash.

In 2019, the desert's original name of Te Onetapu was officially restored as part of a Treaty of Waitangi settlement between the Crown and Ngāti Rangi.

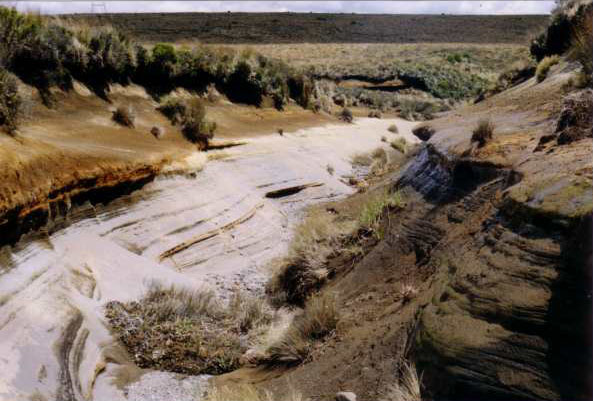
Typical Rangipo scenery, looking west from the Desert Road

== Geography and climate ==
The Rangipo Desert receives 1,500–2,500 mm (59–98 in) of rainfall per year, but resembles a desert because of its location on the volcanic plateau adjacent to and east of Ruapehu, poor soil quality and drying winds, and also due to the mass sterilisation of seeds during a series of violent eruptions, particularly pyroclastic flows forming ignimbrite rocks about 20,000 years ago. The vegetation is low and sparse, consisting of mainly tussock and snow grasses. The headwaters of many small streams, which later turn into large rivers, gouge deep serrated valleys through the unconsolidated ash and pumice-rich earth. The climate here is harsh and alpine, with close to 270 ground frosts per year in comparison with fewer than 30 in the coastal regions of Hawke's Bay, 80 km (50 mi) to the east. Heavy snowfalls - rarely seen in the rest of the island - are also a common occurrence in winter. Trampers and climbers in the area should be mindful of the extreme chill effect of the cold south wind which can produce wind chill factors lowering the temperature below 0°C (32°F) for days on end.

Much of the desert lies at an altitude of over 600 m (2,000 ft), and a considerable proportion of it is over 1,000 m (3,300 ft) above sea level. Many of the North Island's largest rivers have their headwaters in the area, particularly around the slopes of Mount Ruapehu, the North Island's highest mountain. These include the Waikato and Whangaehu Rivers, as well as major tributaries of the Rangitikei and Whanganui Rivers.

== Human interaction ==
The region is largely uninhabited, possibly due to the unproductive nature of the extreme winter climate. One early written account of crossing the desert from the Cornish explorer and missionary William Colenso described it as "a most desolate and weird-looking spot... a fit place for Macbeth's witches, or Faustus's Brocken scene." The town of Waiouru, with its army camp, lies to the south and much of the southern part of the desert is used for training purposes. To the north of the desert lies the Rangipo prison farm.

The desert is bisected by only one sealed road, a section of State Highway 1 known as the Desert Road. The road is closed with barrier arms for short periods most winters, due to severe snow storms and icy road conditions. Turangi emergency services monitor the northern part of the Desert Road, and the NZDF Military Police at Waiouru are responsible for the southern end. The boundary between the Waikato and Manawatū-Whanganui regions intersects the Desert Road at its summit, which at 1,074 m (3,524 ft) above sea level is the highest pass on the New Zealand State Highway network.

The Lord of the Rings films were shot in New Zealand, and the Black Gate of Mordor scenes were shot in the Rangipo Desert in 2000.

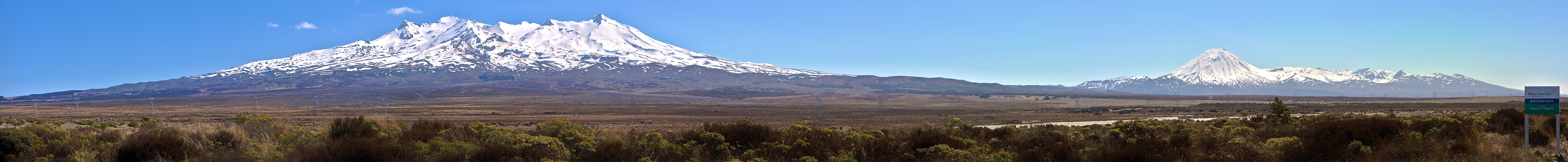
View of the Rangipo Desert showing the three active peaks: Snow-capped Ruapehu (left), conical Ngauruhoe (centre) and broad-domed Tongariro (right)
