= Grand Galet Falls =

Landmark in Réunion National Park

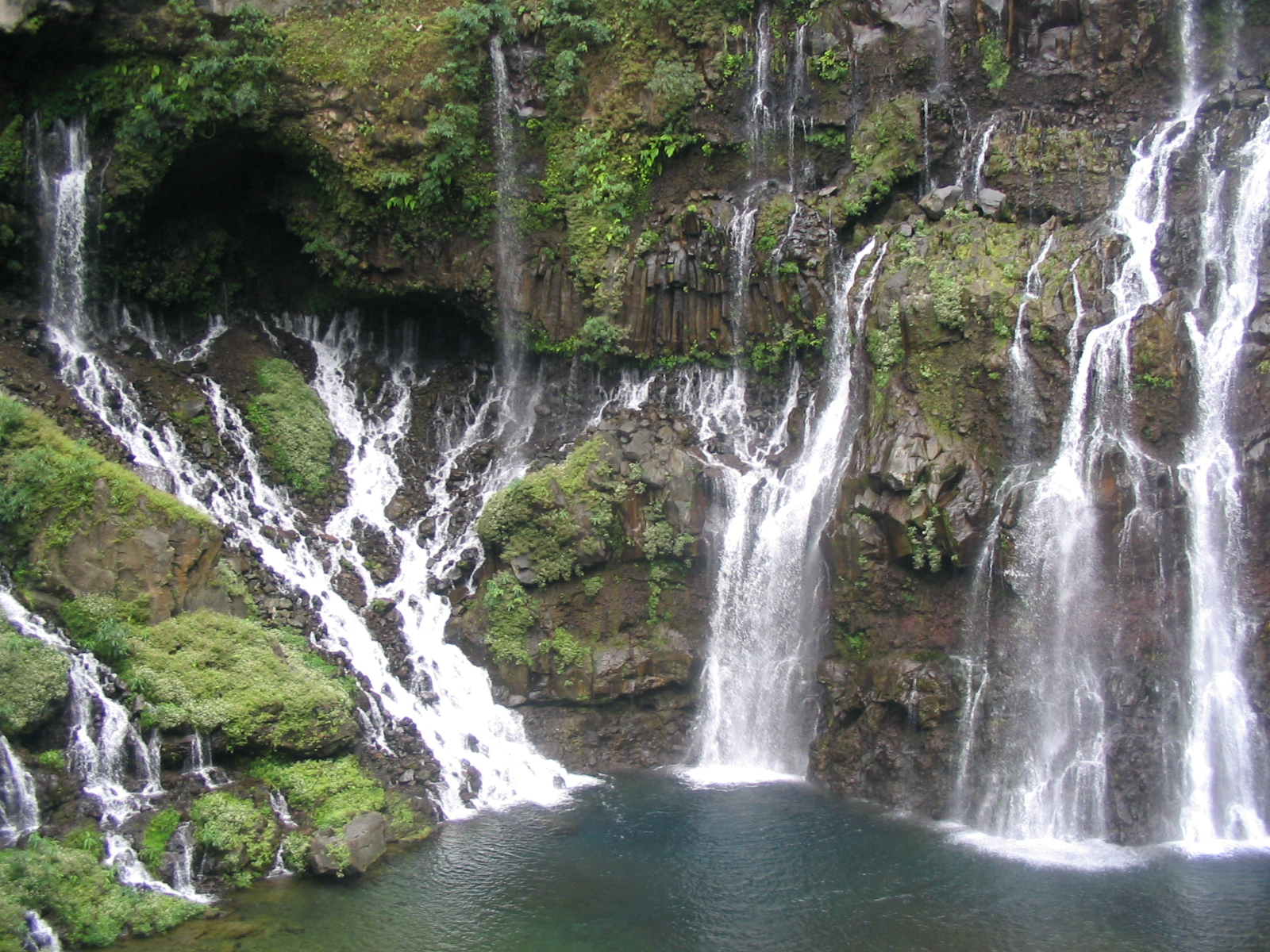
- Grand Galet Falls

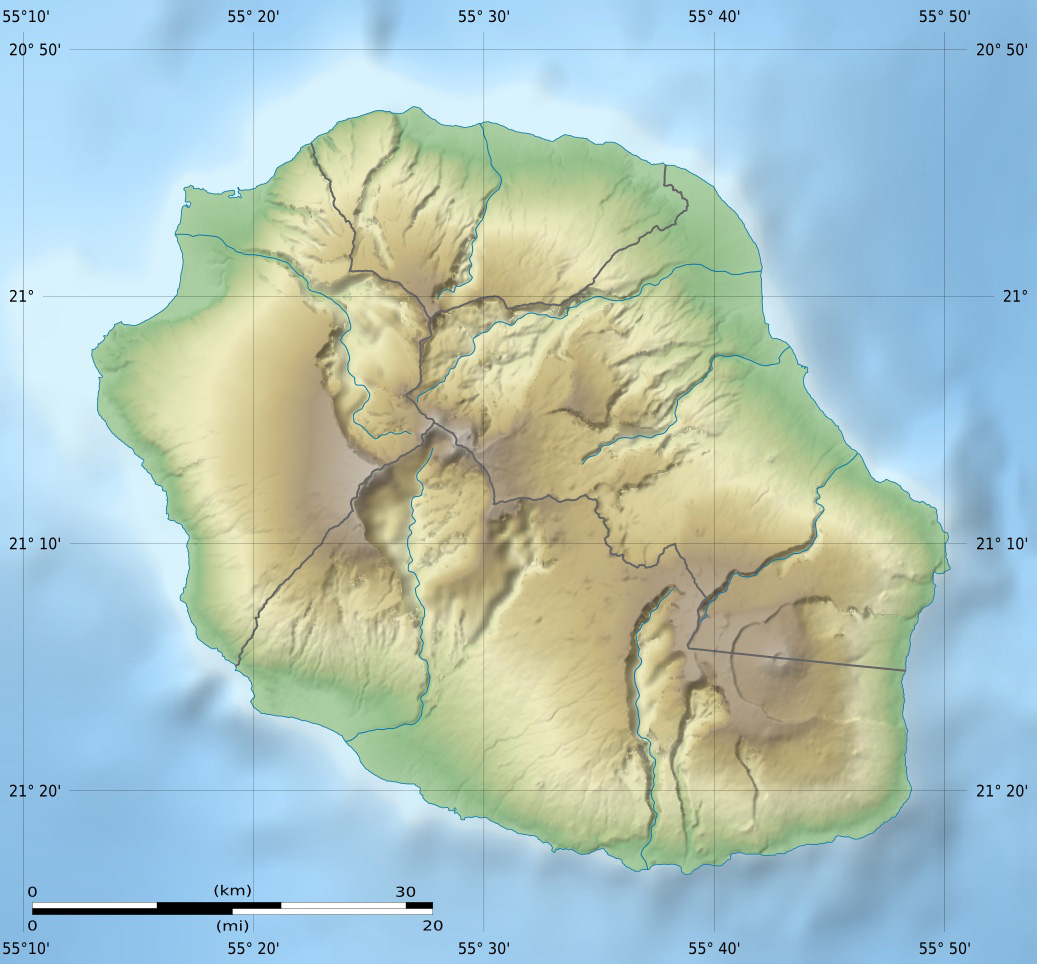
- Location within Réunion
- Location: Saint-Joseph, Reunion island
- Coordinates: 21°18′39″S 55°38′30″E
- Total height: 45 m (148 ft)
- Watercourse: Langevin River

The Grand Galet Falls (also called Langevin Falls after the name of its river) is situated in the commune of Saint-Joseph on the island of Réunion.

It is situated in the Réunion National Park, and its natural pool is a popular swimming and picnic place on weekends and holidays. In 2022, €941,000 was allocated for renovations to the entrance, including the reinforcement of the only bridge connecting the area and nearby neighborhoods Passerelle and Grand Défriché.

== See also ==
- List of waterfalls
