= Église Sainte-Marie de Valle-d'Orezza =

Church in Haute-Corse, France

Coordinates: 42°22′11″N 9°23′43″E

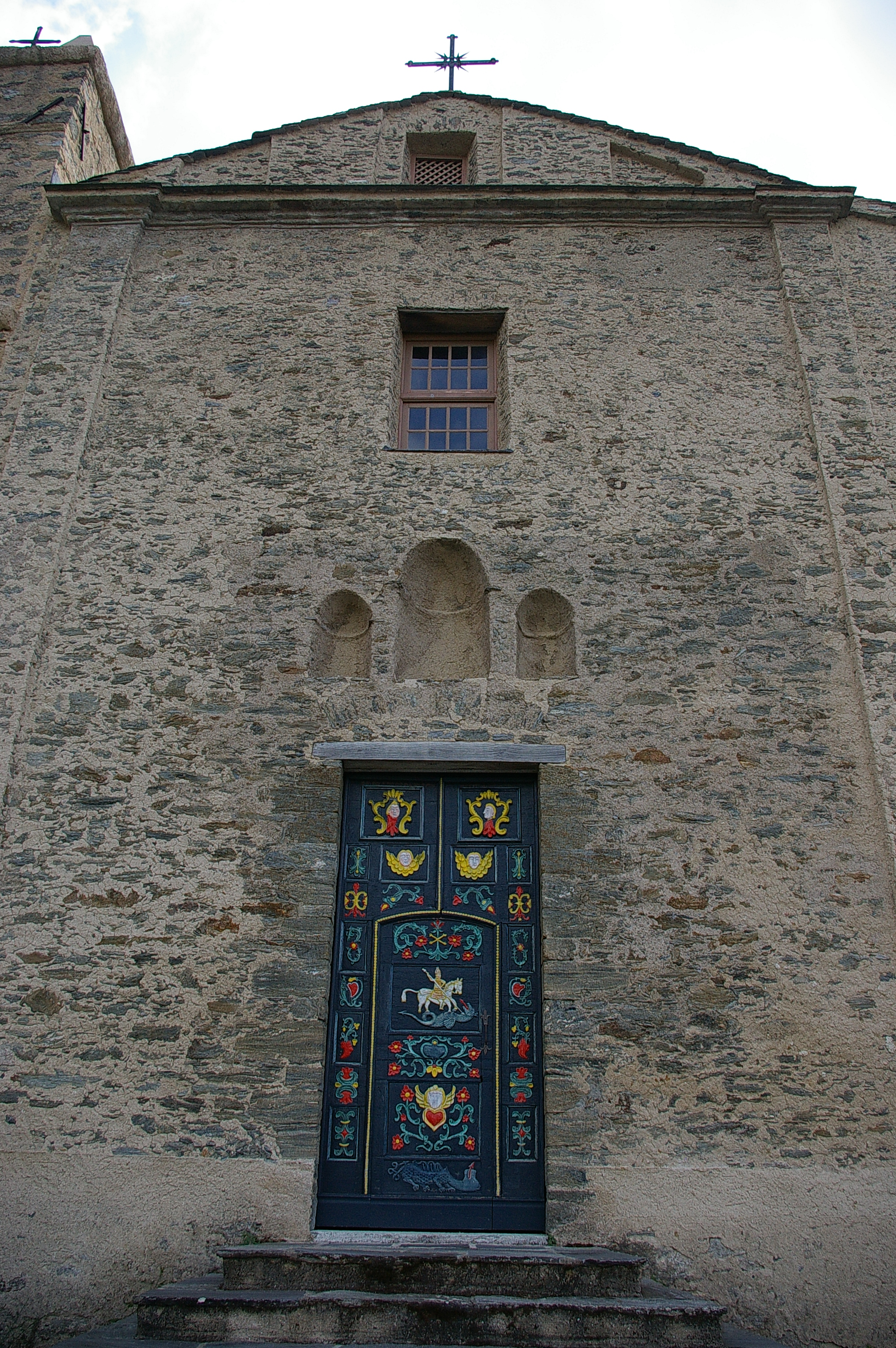
Church of St. Mary of Valle d'Orezza

Église Sainte-Marie de Valle-d'Orezza is a church in Valle-d'Orezza, Haute-Corse, Corsica. Its interior decoration was classified as a Historic Monument in 1976.
