= Volcanic desert =

Land without vegetation due to volcanic activity

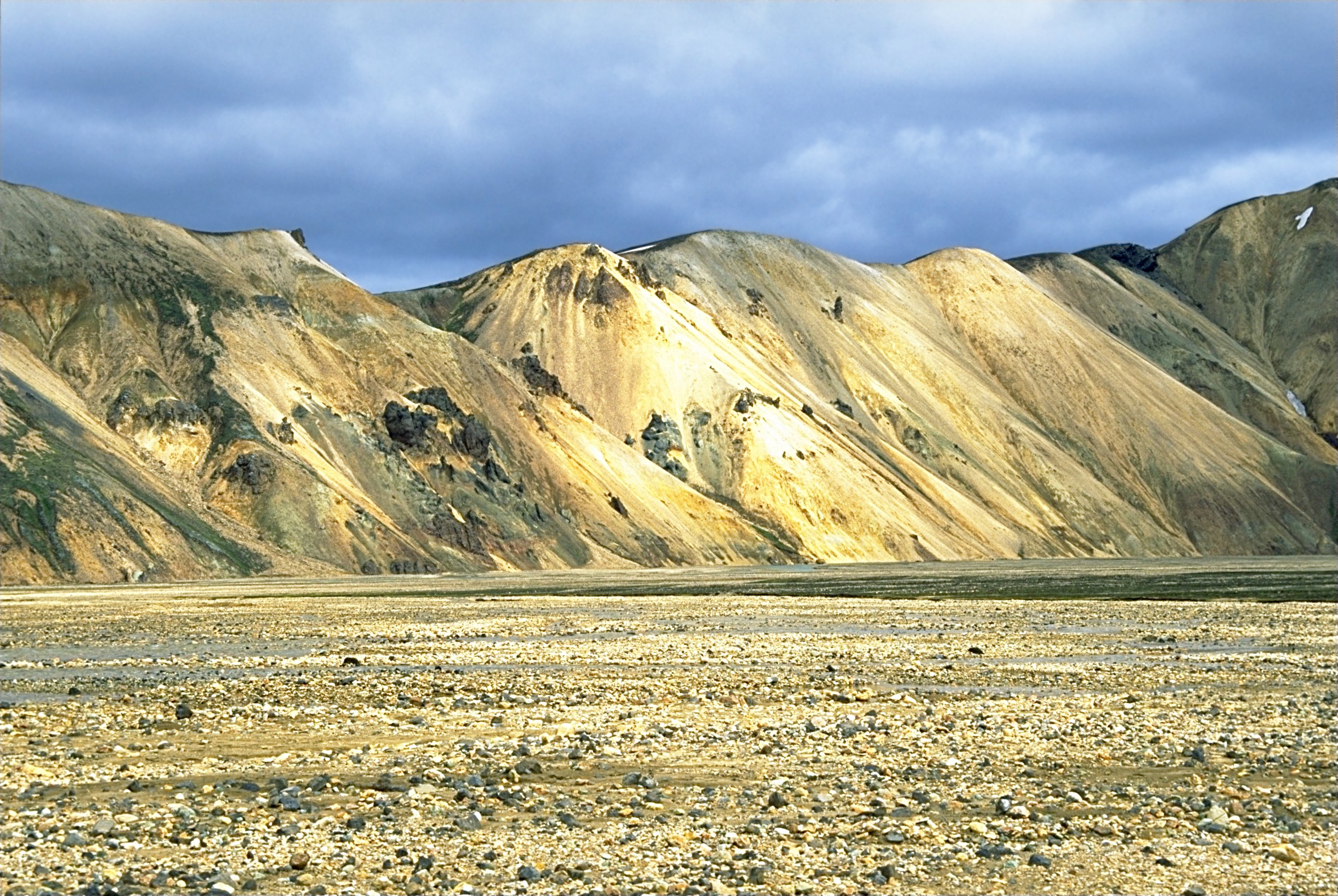
Landmannalaugar in south-central Iceland is an example of a volcanic desert

A volcanic desert is an area largely or completely devoid of vegetation because of volcanic activity. The term is usually applied to larger areas such as the Highlands of Iceland, the Rangipo Desert in New Zealand or Cordón Caulle in Chile. Occasionally though, it is used for relatively small regions such as the Kaʻū Desert on the island of Hawaiʻi.

Volcanic deserts may have enough precipitation to sustain vegetation, but due to repeated covering of tephra and acid rain after eruptions and high percolation and infiltration rates of water, vegetation is scarce. In addition to this volcanic desert shows often poor or little soil formation due to slow chemical weathering caused by cold climate or coarse tephra. This is how the Plaine des Sables, on the island of Réunion, can find itself close to the Commerson Crater, a place which holds several world records of rainfall.

== Examples ==
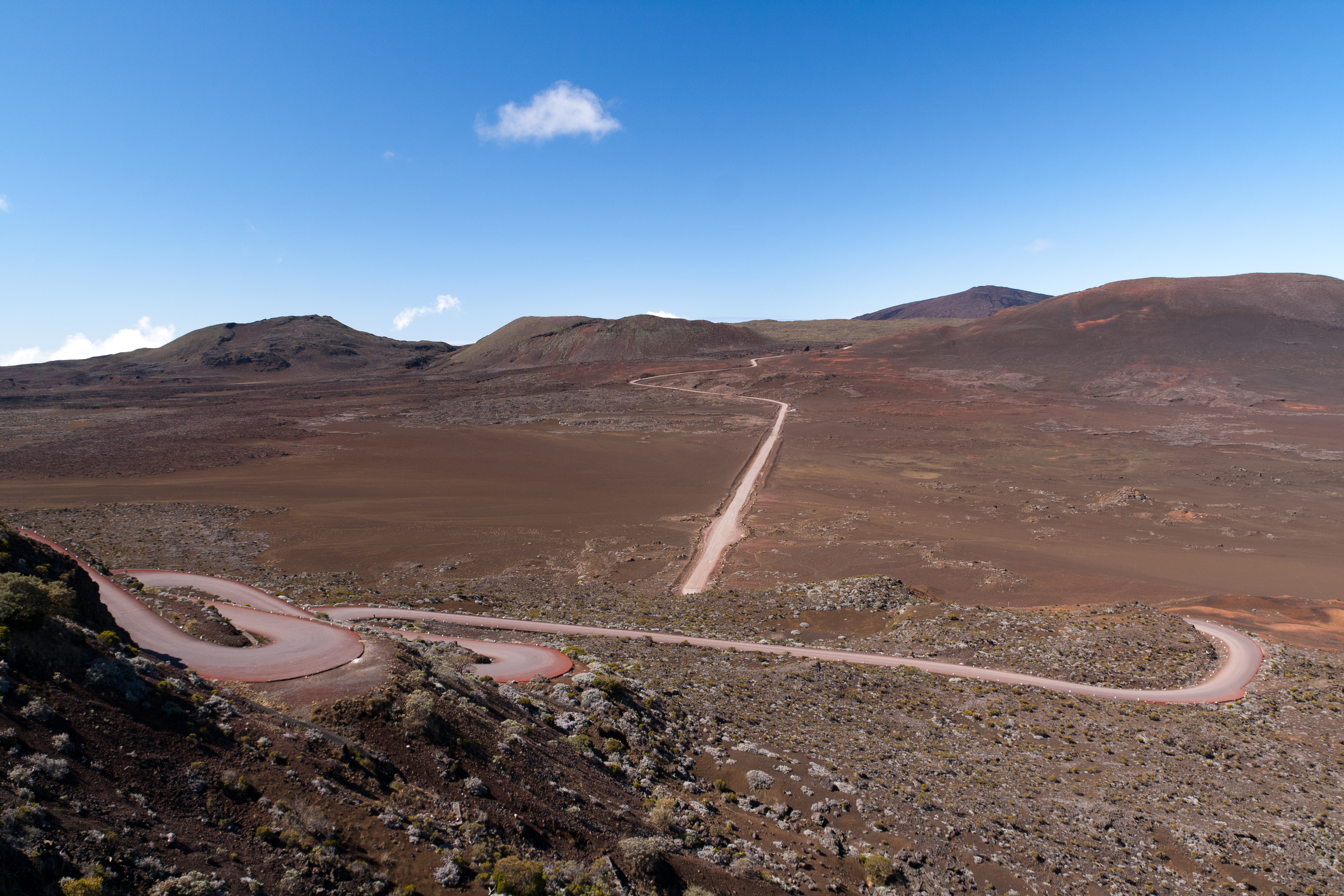
The Plaine des Sables in Réunion.

- Highlands of Iceland, in Iceland.
- Plaine des Sables, in Réunion, an overseas department of France.
- Kaʻū Desert, in Hawaii, United States.
- Pumice Desert, in the United States.
- Cordón Caulle in Chile.
- Ura-sabaku, in Japan.
- Bromo Sand Area, in Indonesia.
- Rangipo Desert, in New Zealand.
