= Réunion National Park =

French national park in Réunion

- IUCN category II (national park)

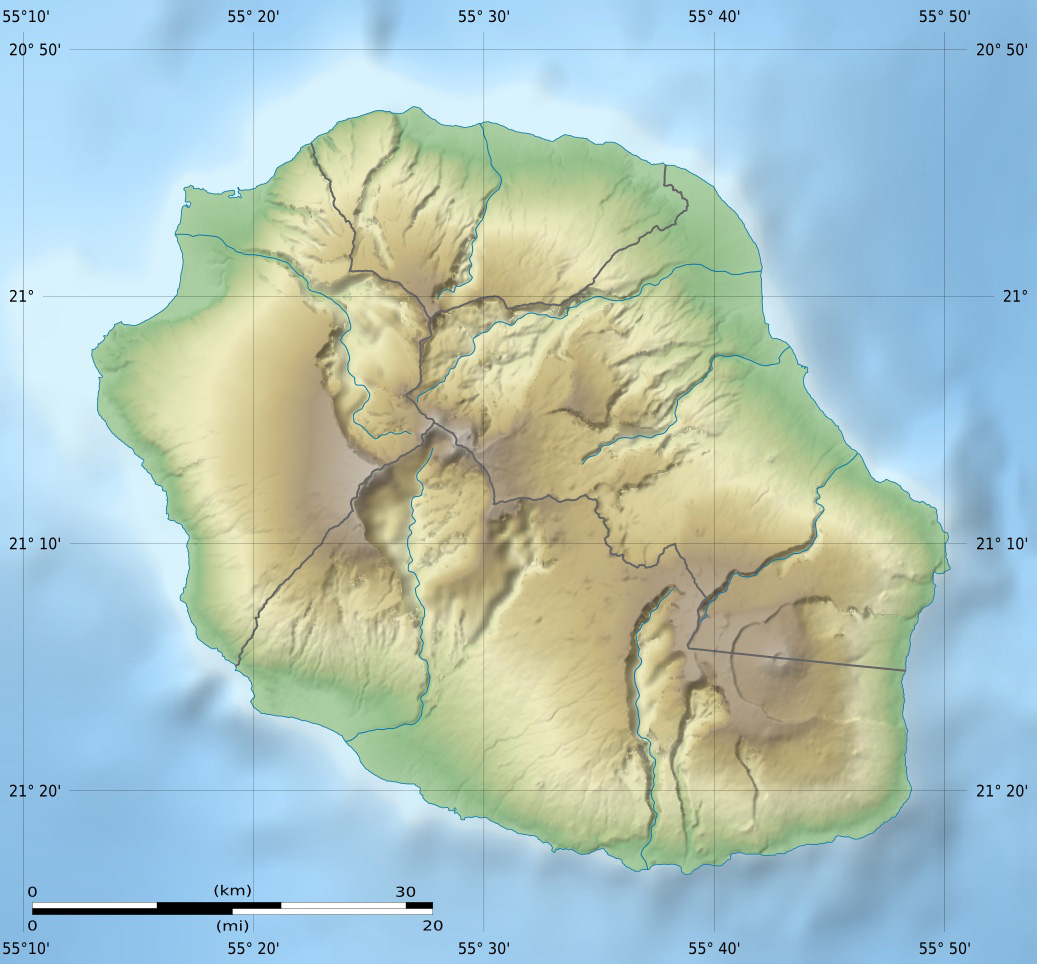
- Location within Réunion Location within Africa Location within Indian Ocean
- Location: Réunion (France); Western Indian Ocean
- Nearest city: Saint-Denis
- Coordinates: 21°09′00″S 55°30′00″E
- Area: 1,053.84 km^{2} (406.89 sq mi), core area 876.96 km^{2} (338.60 sq mi), area of voluntary commitment
- Established: 5 March 2007
- Governing body: Parcs nationaux de France
- Website: Parc national de la Réunion (French)

UNESCO World Heritage Site
- Official name: Pitons, cirques and remparts of Reunion Island
- Criteria: Natural: (vii)(x)
- Reference: 1317
- Inscription: 2010 (34th Session)
- Area: 105,838 ha (261,530 acres)
- Buffer zone: 11,729 ha (28,980 acres)

Réunion National Park (French: Parc national de La Réunion) is a National Park of France located on the island of Réunion, an overseas department in the western Indian Ocean. Established on 5 March 2007, the park protects the endemic ecosystems of Les Hauts, Réunion's mountainous interior, and covers around 42% of the island. Notable endemic species include the Réunion cuckooshrike and the Reunion Island day gecko.

Plans for a park date back to 1985, and in a public survey in 2004, the communes of Réunion approved the creation of a national park. It officially came into existence in 2007. The park's volcanic landscape, including the Piton de la Fournaise, an active volcano, was designated a World Heritage Site in 2010, under the name "Pitons, cirques and remparts of Reunion Island" for its imposing rugged terrain and exceptional biodiversity. The park's mission, other than preserving landscape and biodiversity, is to share knowledge and welcome visitors, and to work together with local communes. It is a popular destination for hiking and mountaineering.

Controversies have emerged over economic development in the park, notably the exploitation of geothermal power. In 2016, the Regional Council of Réunion had plans to downgrade the national park to a regional nature park to ease tourism development. This was contested by the park authorities and opposition politicians.

== History ==
Proposals to create a park were first raised beginning in 1985. The Réunion Environmental Charter and the Regional Development Plan formally established the principle that a park should be created in Les Hauts, the mountainous interior of the island. The French Ministry of the Environment was officially consulted for the creation of a national park.

Between 2000 and 2003, a consultation process was launched, in which the state, the region, the département, and the association of mayors agreed on a protocol and established a steering committee. 27 of 29 institutions endorsed the plan of establishing a national park, and on 29 March 2003, the French Prime Minister signed a decree acknowledging the project.

Debates and negotiations on the limits and objectives of the future national park intensified. Between August and September 2004, the plan was the subject of a public survey, organised by the prefect in the 24 communes of the island. The communes responded positively to the project, adding some recommendations.

The park officially came into existence on 5 March 2007 through a decree taken after advice by the Council of State. In April 2007, the Administration Council took office; between 2007 and 2009, personnel were employed and installations made on the site. In 2008, work began to set up the charter of the national park.

On 1 August 2010, the UNESCO World Heritage Committee acknowledged the value of the natural sites within Réunion National Park, and included the "Pitons, cirques and remparts of Réunion Island" in its World Heritage list.

== Mission ==
In its charter, the national park identifies four main objectives: First, to preserve the diversity of landscapes and accompany their evolution. Second, to inverse the loss of biodiversity. Third, to preserve and add value to the culture of the highlands and ensure the transmission of its values. Fourth, to foster economic development for the highland.

== Geography ==
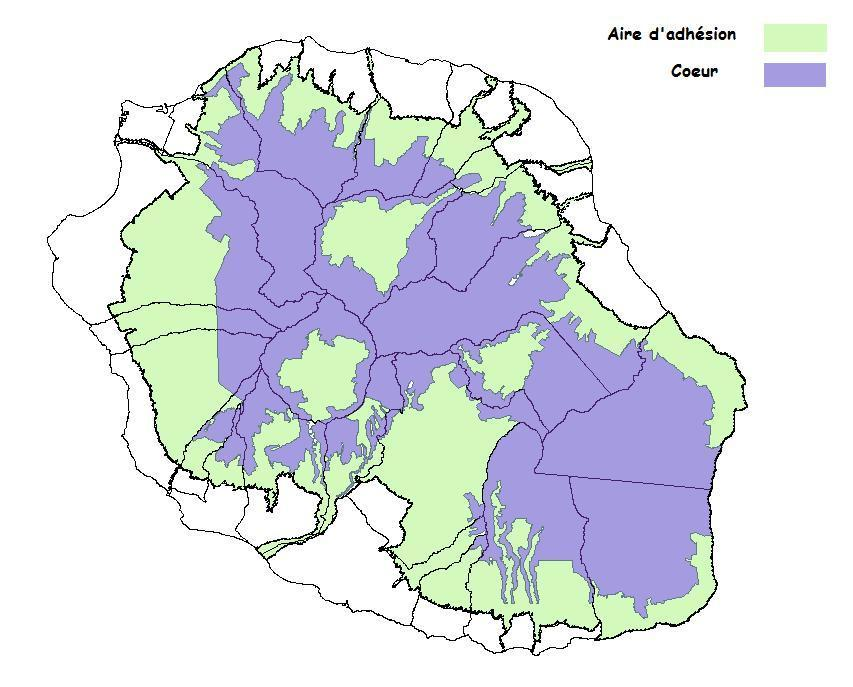
Core area (blue) and buffer zone (green) of Réunion National Park

The core of Réunion National Park covers 1,053.84 km^{2} (406.89 sq mi) in the interior of the island, corresponding to 42% of its surface and extending over the land of 23 communes. This core area also includes some inhabited and cultivated land. Adjacent to the core is an area of voluntary commitment (aire d'adhésion, buffer zone) covering 876.96 km^{2} (338.60 sq mi) and touching all 24 communes on the island. Altogether, the park extends over more than 75% of the island. The island of Réunion is volcanic in origin and sits over a hotspot. Two volcanoes form its backbone: The Piton des Neiges, over 3,000 m (9,800 ft) high, and the still active Piton de la Fournaise. Four major areas form the heart of the national park, listed as World Heritage site:

- Mare Longue forest at Saint-Philippe, including some of the best-preserved remains of low-altitude tropical forest, termed Forêt de bois de couleurs des Bas;
- the Cirque de Cilaos with the Pain de Sucre and La chapelle rock formations, in the narrow gorge of the Bras Rouge River, and 100,000-year-old accessible magma chamber;
- the Cirque de Salazie with the Piton d'Anchaing, a 1,356 m (4,449 ft) high dominant massif;
- La Grande Chaloupe between Saint-Denis and La Possession, one of the last remainders of the semi-evergreen forest once common in the west of the island, preserved and restored here.

== Wildlife ==
Réunion shares a common natural history with the other Mascarene Islands, Mauritius and Rodrigues. All three islands were uninhabited before the 1600s. Human arrival led to massive extinction and introduced species, such as giant land snails in Réunion, which threatened native habitats and species. Less than 25% of Réunion is thought to be covered with original vegetation according to the World Wildlife Fund (WWF), mostly restricted to higher altitudes. The forests of Réunion and the other two islands have been classified as the "Mascarene forests" ecoregion by the WWF, with a conservation status of "endangered". Conservation International includes Réunion in the "Madagascar and Indian Ocean Islands" biodiversity hotspot, a priority area for conservation. Nearly as many exotic plants as native ones, 830, have become naturalised on the island, and 50 are considered invasive, threatening native flora and habitats.

The isolation of the island and its diversity of habitats and microclimates have favoured the diversification of a highly endemic flora: Of the 850 known native plant species, 230 are endemic, and half of those are endangered. This native flora is found at various altitudes. The rough topography of the park has also allowed for the allopatric speciation of many bird species, such as Barau's petrel, the Réunion harrier, the Réunion cuckooshrike, and the Réunion grey white-eye, as well as genetic differentiation within those species. In total, 18 bird species are found at Réunion, half of which are endemic. At least 22 bird species have already gone extinct since human colonisation. A major threat to the bird fauna are introduced cats and rats. Of mammals, the Mauritian flying fox recolonised the Réunion after going extinct from the island. Notable butterfly species include Papilio phorbanta and Salamis augustina, and an endemic reptile is the Reunion Island day gecko.

Endemic fauna and flora of Réunion National Park
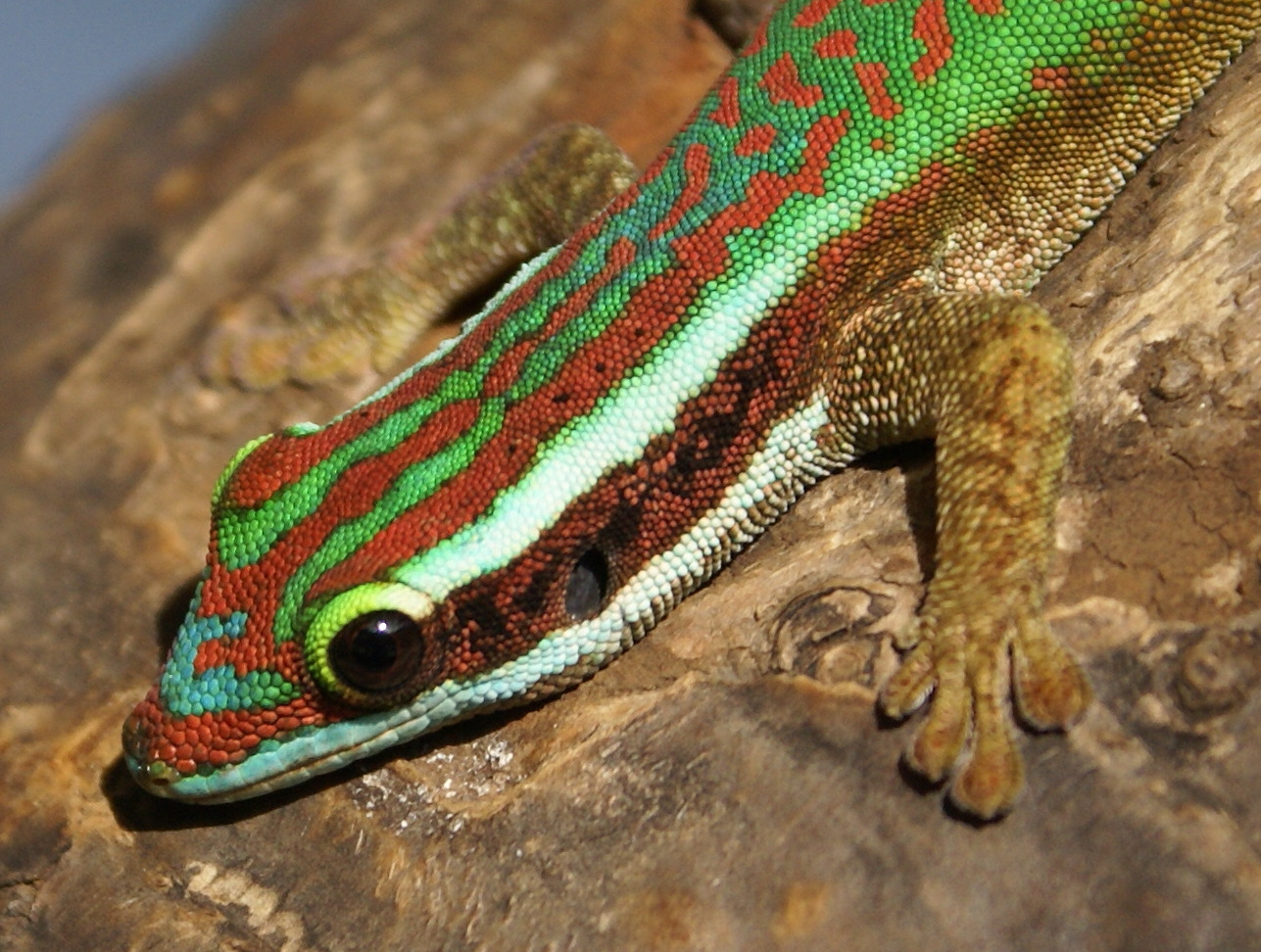
Réunion Island ornate day gecko (Phelsuma inexpectata)

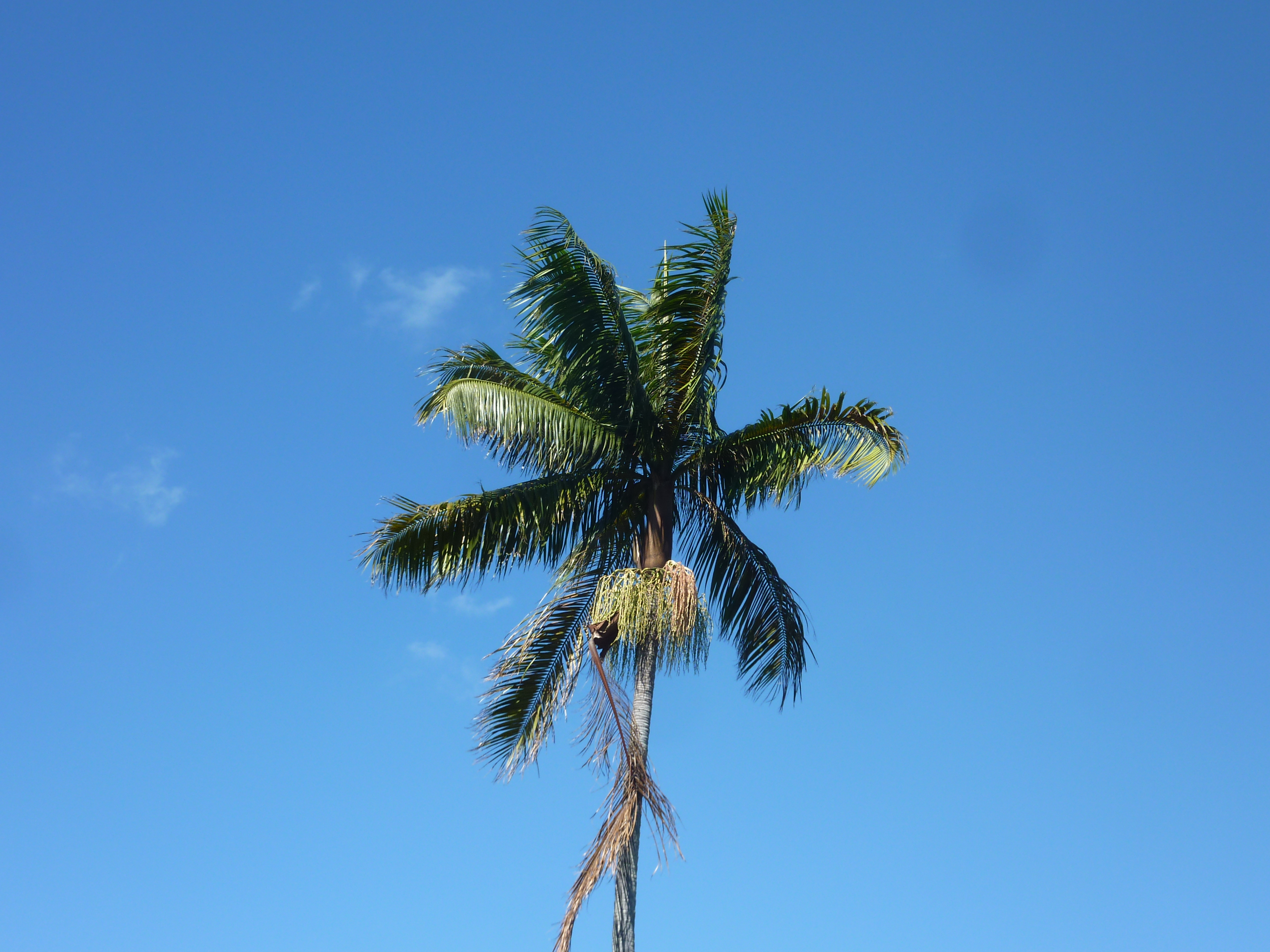
Acanthophoenix rousselii, an endemic palm tree

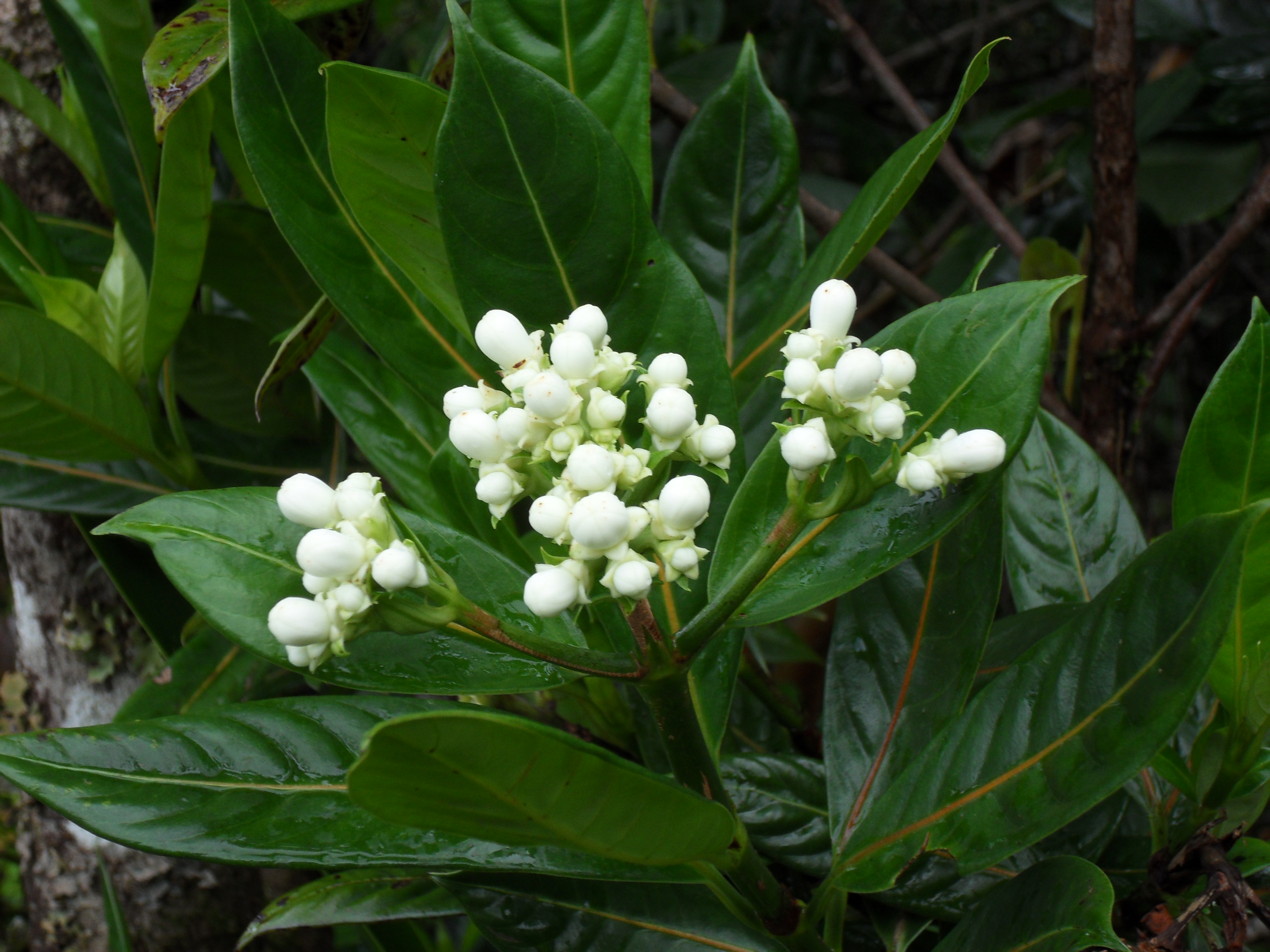
Gaertneria vaginata, "Losto café"

== Gallery ==
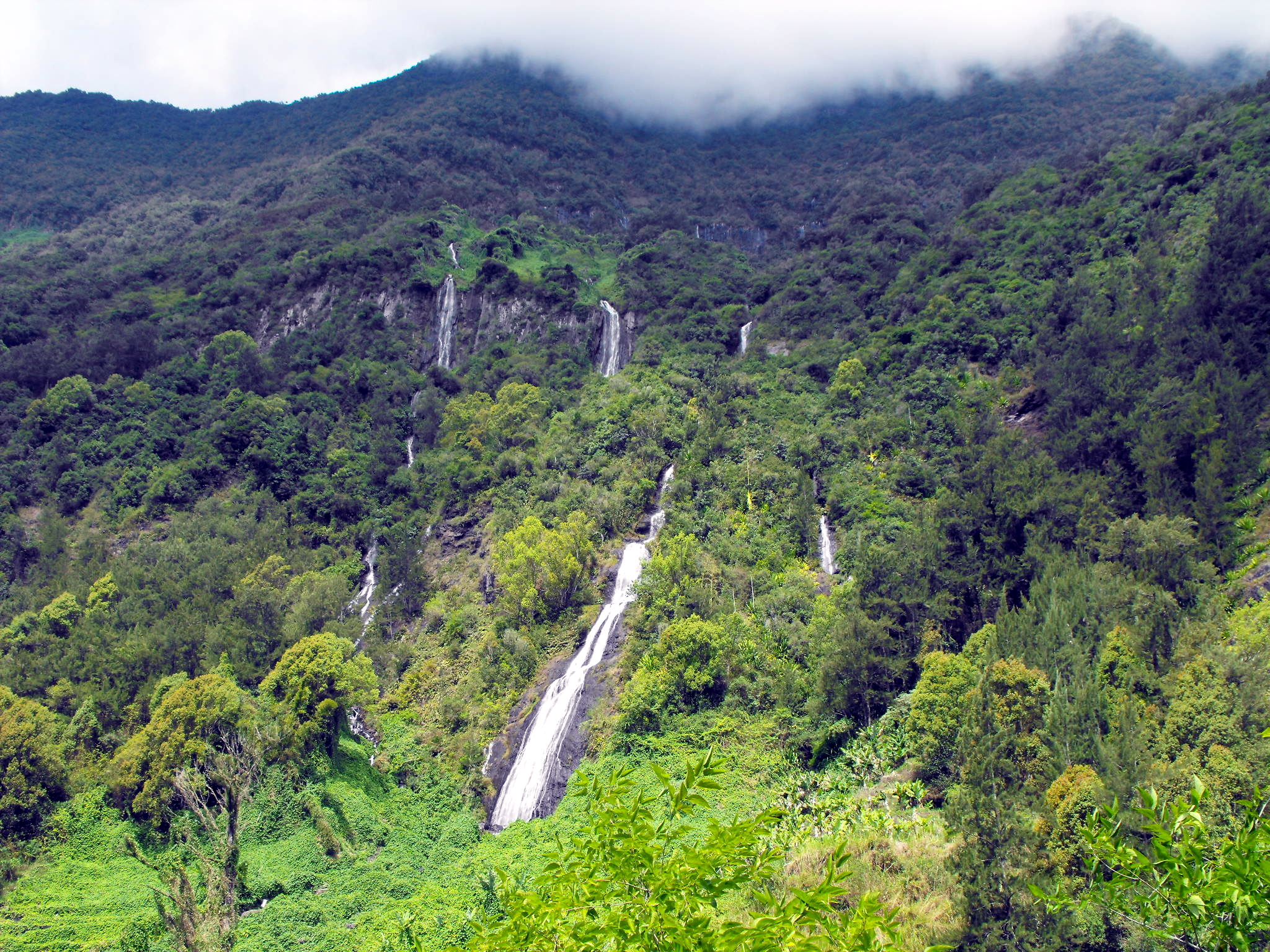
Bridal Veil Falls, Salazie

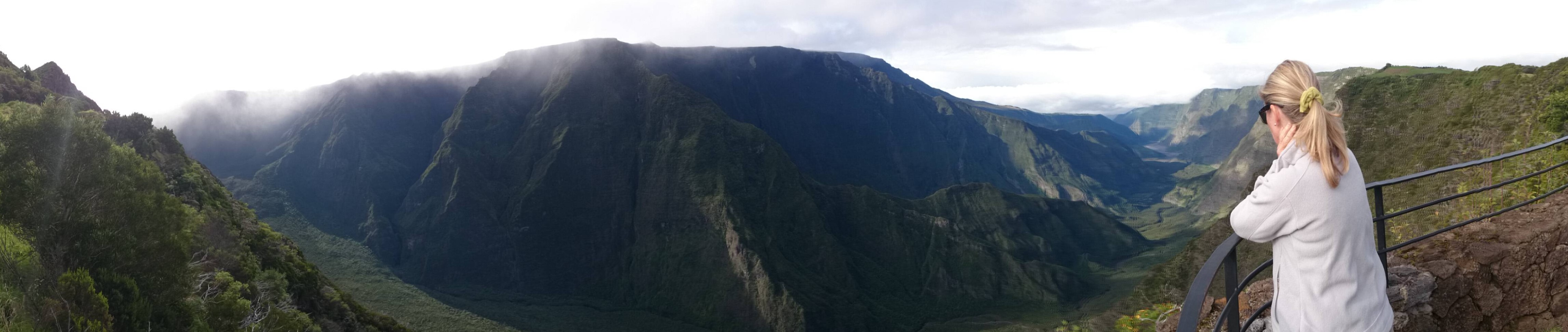
Panorama from Nez de Boeuf

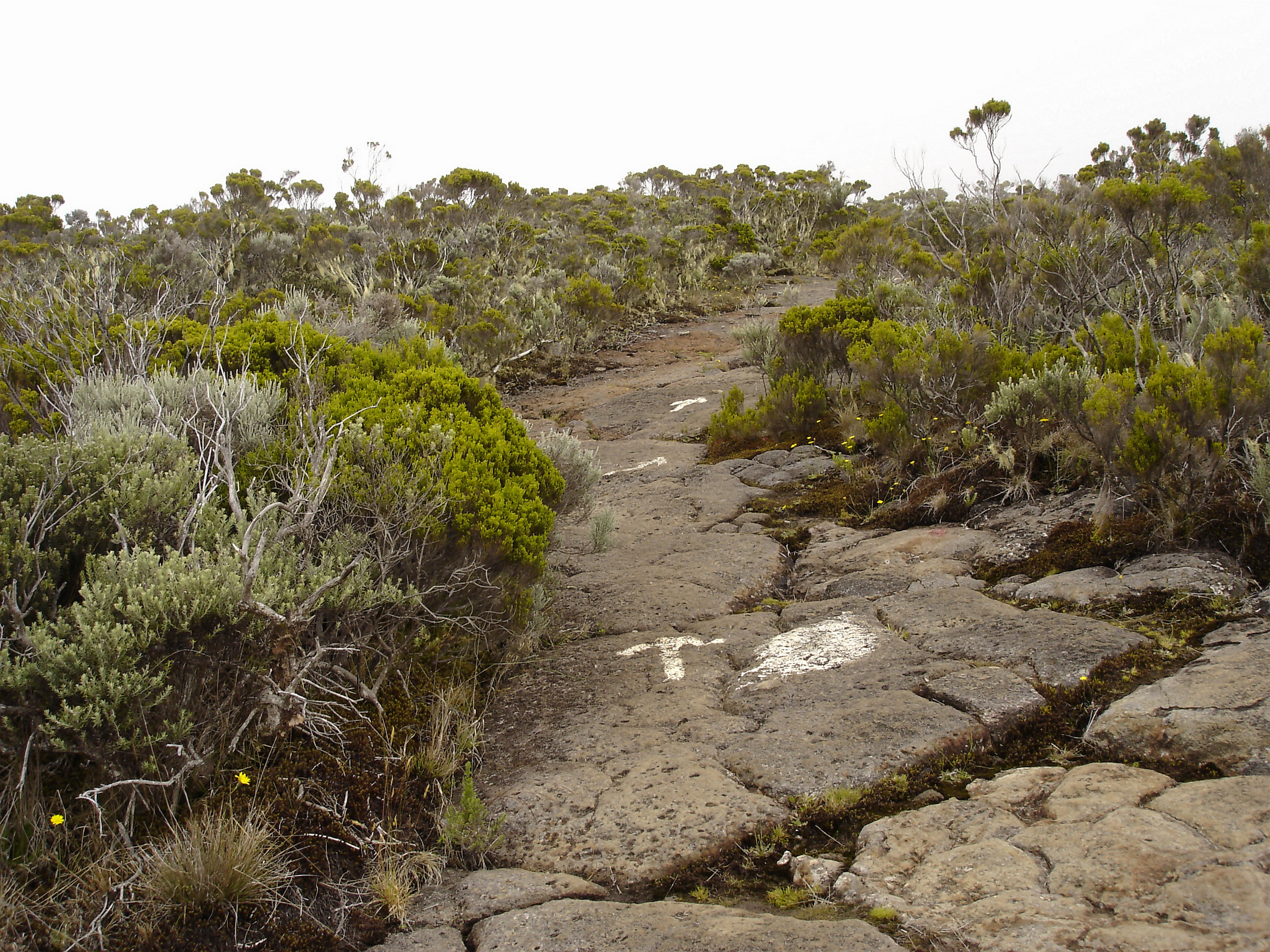
A trail leading to the Roche Écrite summit

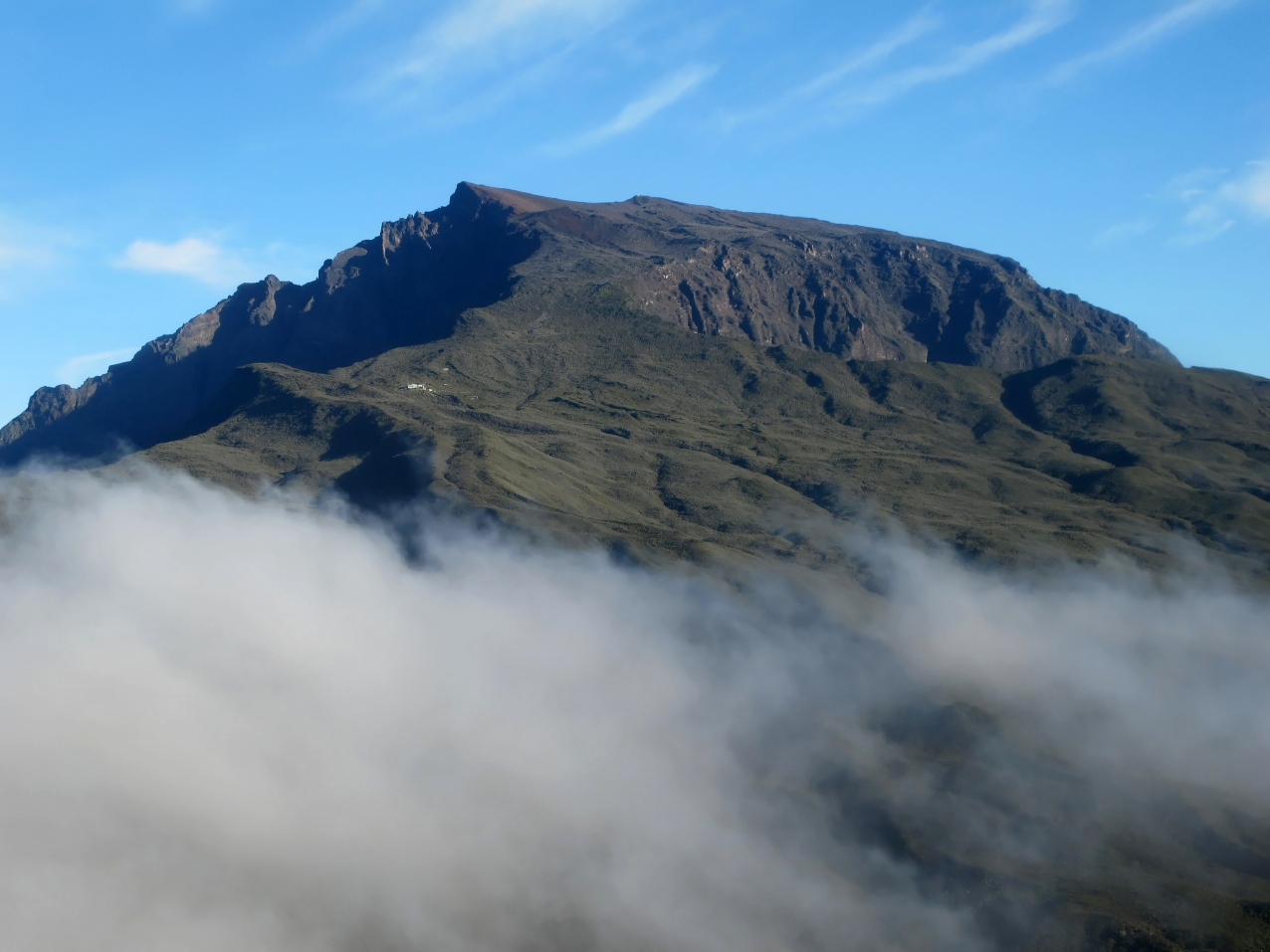
The Piton des Neiges

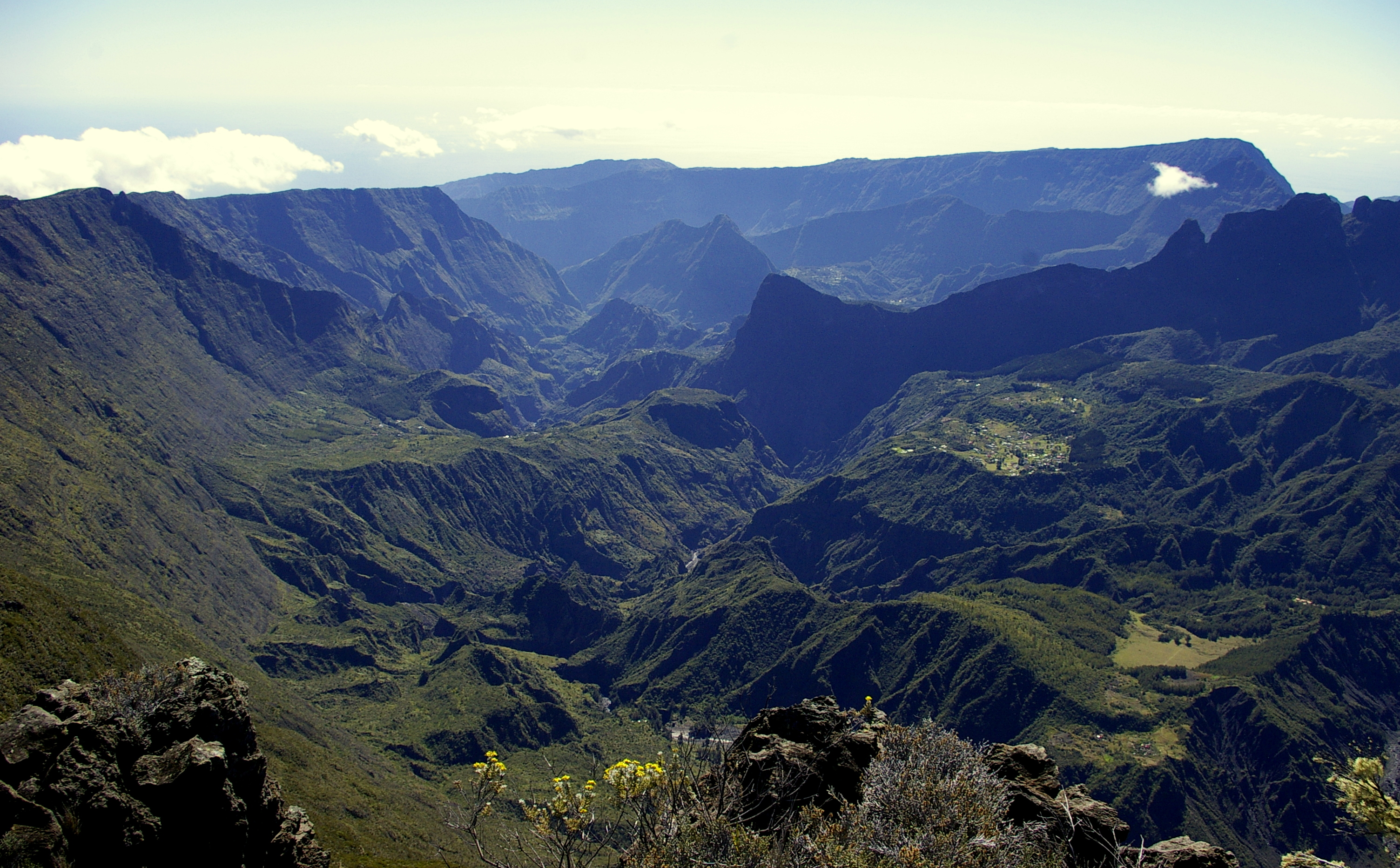
Cirque de Mafate with
the îlet La Nouvelle

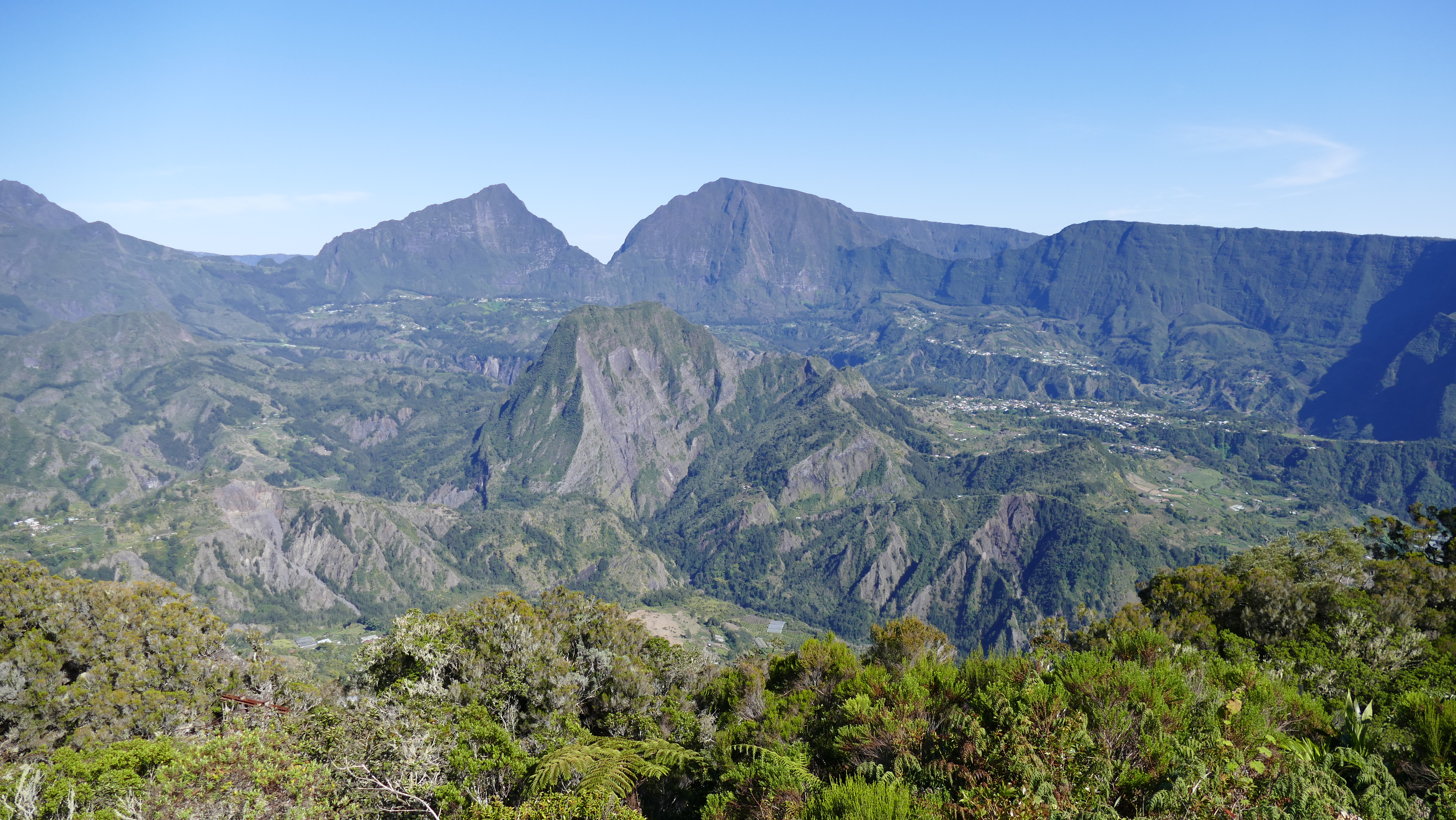
Cirque de Salazie

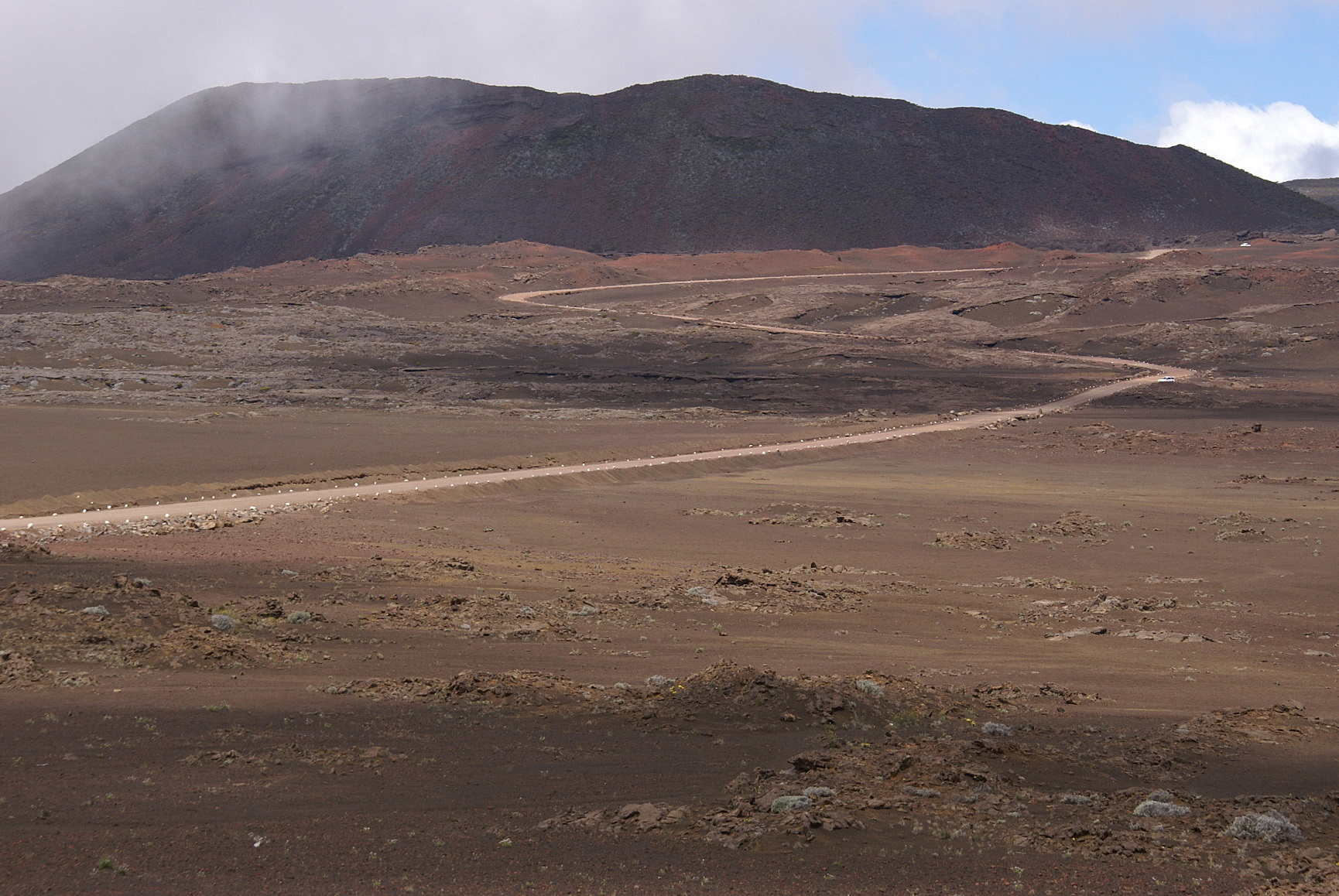
Plaine des Sables

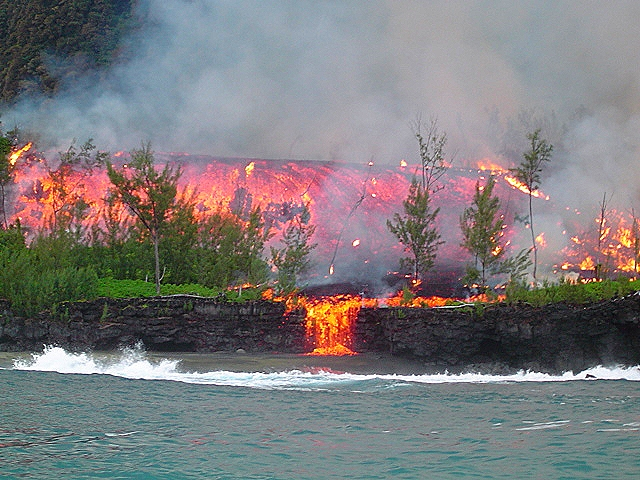
Flow of lava of the Piton de la Fournaise

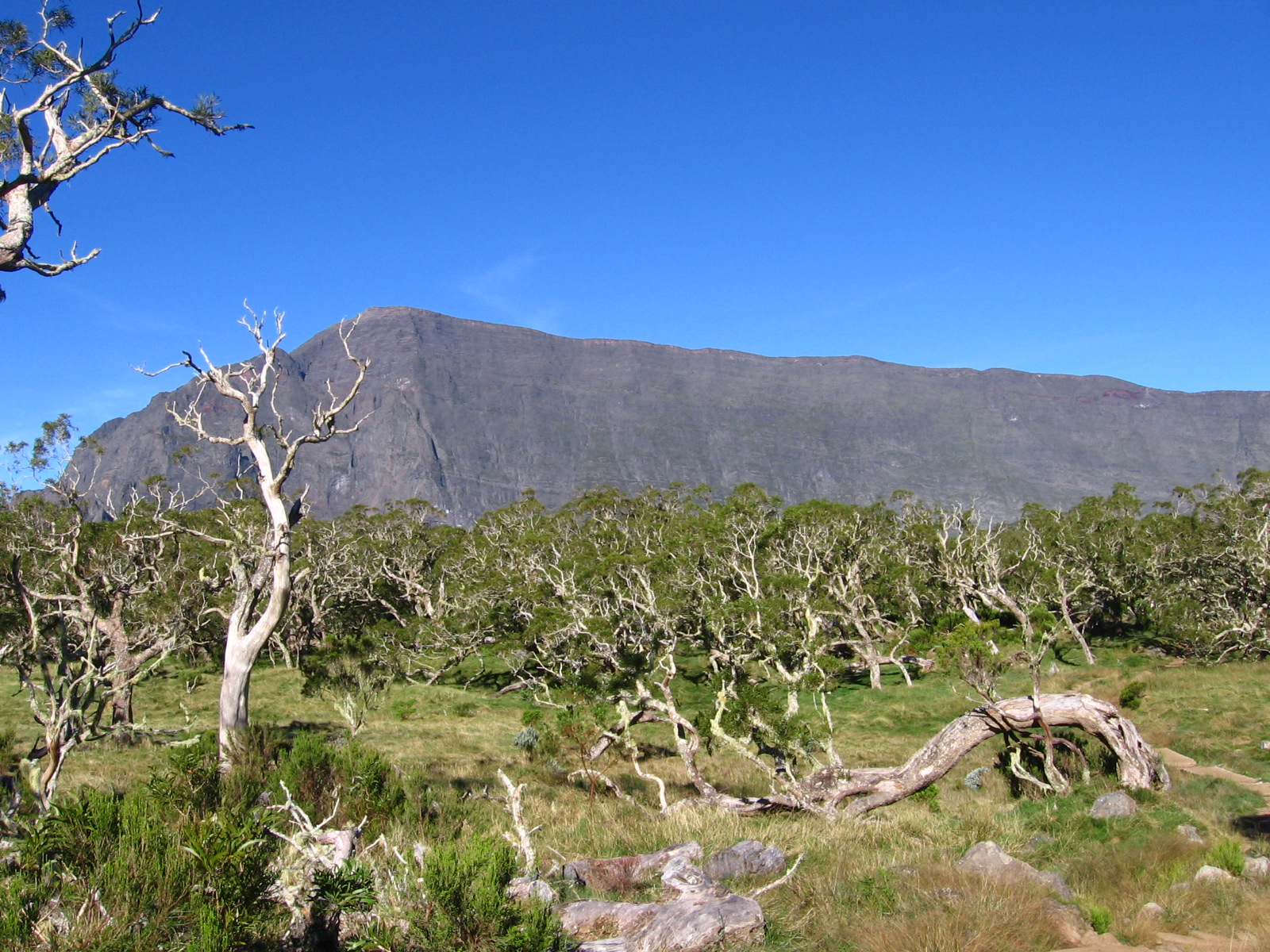
Acacia heterophylla's forest

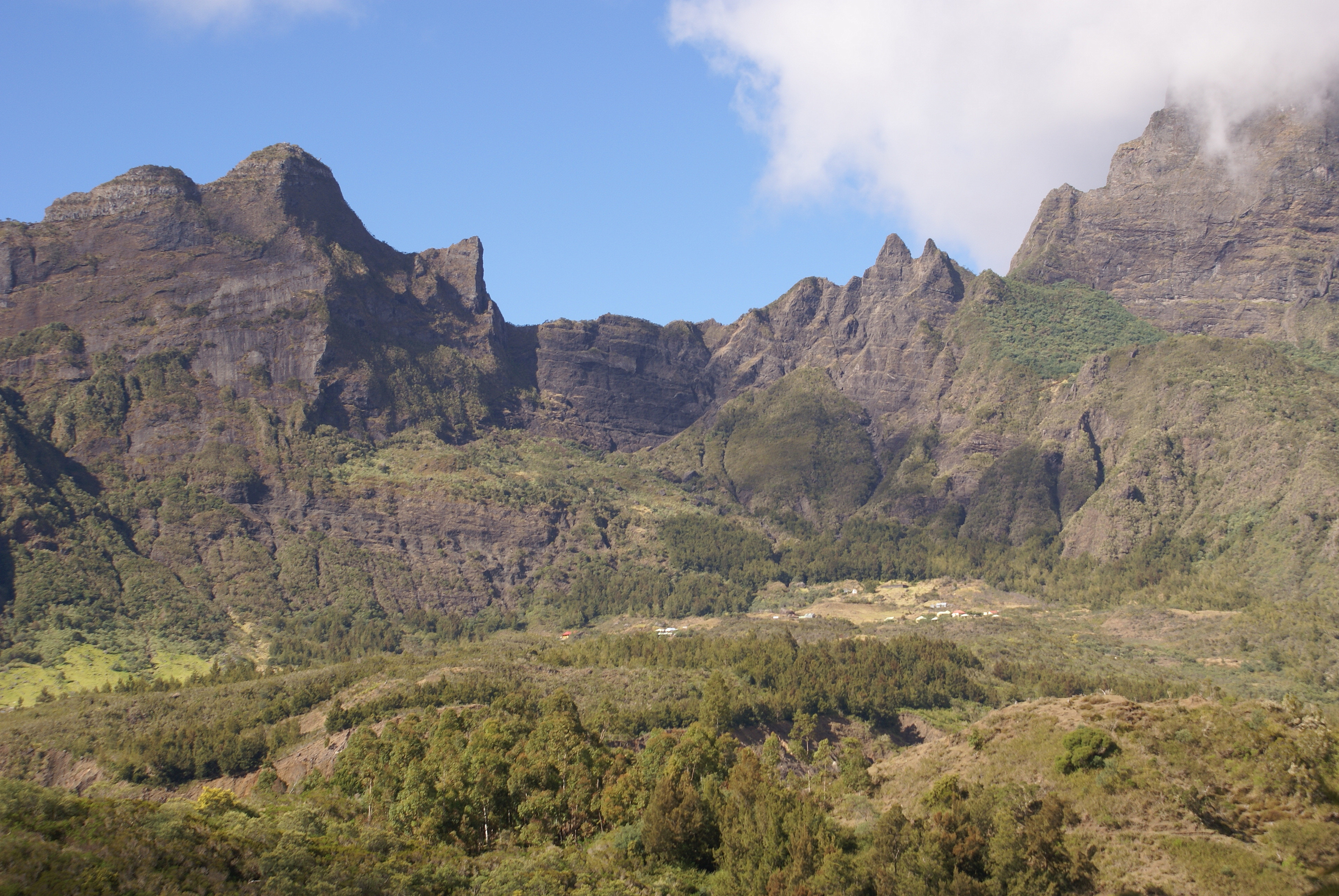
Cirque de Mafate

== Tourism ==
The national park constitutes one of Réunion's major attractions. Its mountains are a popular destination for hiking and mountaineering; there are more than 900 km (560 mi) of marked trails, crossing such different landscapes as rain forests, sugar cane plantations and volcanic fields. They include three long-distance trails approved by the French Hiking Federation, with mountain lodges along the trail. More than 400,000 people each year visit the Piton de la Fournaise volcano, for which a discovery trail has been established.

The park's visitor's centre, Maison du parc at La Plaine-des-Palmistes, was inaugurated on 21 August 2014 by French President François Hollande.

== Management ==
The park is governed by an administrative council (Conseil d'administration, CA) composed of 88 members, the majority of them local representatives. It is elected for 6-year terms. A 15-member executive committee (Bureau) was established during the first administrative council's term and acts on its behalf.

A scientific council (Conseil scientifique, CS), with 18 members from various disciplines and 11 outside experts, advises the administrative council and the park's director. Further, there is an economic, social, and cultural council (Conseil économique, social et culturel, CESC) composed of public figures and representatives from local institutions and associations.

The park's regulations, notably regarding the core of the area, are stated in its charter.

== Controversies ==
Since the national park's creation, debates have arisen on its management and the impacts on the population of the upland. Inhabitants of the area, which live in small hamlets, so called îlets, criticized management for not respecting their history and traditions, and cited farming activities banned on several occasions. Park officials maintained that every activity was possible under certain conditions.

The volcanic setting holds potential for renewable energy production from geothermal power. However, this conflicts with the national park's vocation of preserving the natural and cultural landscape. As of 2016, pilot studies were carried out for two 5 MW geothermal power plants, at the foot of the Piton des neiges and on the Plaine des Sables, on which a project had already been considered and later abandoned. Both sites fall in the aire d'adhésion outside the park's core area, but proposals have also been made for sites within the World Heritage site boundary.

In February 2016, the conservative majority in the Regional Council of Réunion with president Didier Robert announced plans to transform the national park into a regional nature park. Too restrictive rules, which hindered tourism development, was cited as a motive. A regional nature park, unlike a national park, functions on the basis of mutual agreements and has no power to establish its own regulations. Park officials and opposition politicians rejected the plan, saying it would threaten the island's biodiversity, the World Heritage listing, and critical access to state funding. It would be the first case of a national park in France being downgraded. In September 2016, the national park's director, Marylène Hoarau, announced her withdrawal upon pressure from Ségolène Royal, head of the Ministry of Ecology, Sustainable Development and Energy. This led the park's president, Daniel Gonthier, to suspect political interference; Hoarau had criticised Robert for launching a call for proposals on the future of the park. In an interview, Robert denied involvement in Hoarau's departure and criticised the minister for her decision.
