= Valle-d'Orezza =

- Commune
- Location of Valle-d'Orezza
- Location within France Location within Corsica
- Coordinates: 42°22′07″N 9°23′55″E
- Country: France
- Region: Corsica
- Department: Haute-Corse
- Arrondissement: Corte
- Canton: Castagniccia

Government
  - Mayor (2024–2026): Valérie Ferrandi
- Area^{1}: 3.93 km^{2} (1.52 sq mi)
- Elevation: 600 m (2,000 ft)
- Highest elevation: 1,200 m (3,900 ft)
- Lowest elevation: 433 m (1,421 ft)
- Population (2023): 25
  - Density: 6.4/km^{2} (16/sq mi)
- Time zone: UTC+01:00 (CET)
  - Summer (DST): UTC+02:00 (CEST)
- INSEE/Postal code: 2B338 /20229
- ^{1} French Land Register data, which excludes lakes, ponds, glaciers > 1 km^{2} (0.386 sq mi or 247 acres) and river estuaries.

Valle-d'Orezza is a commune in the Haute-Corse department of France on the island of Corsica.

== Population ==
Historical population
| Year | Pop. | ±% p.a. |
|---|---|---|
| 1968 | 91 | — |
| 1975 | 71 | −3.48% |
| 1982 | 65 | −1.25% |
| 1990 | 50 | −3.23% |
| 1999 | 49 | −0.22% |
| 2007 | 46 | −0.79% |
| 2012 | 44 | −0.89% |
| 2017 | 43 | −0.46% |
| 2023 | 25 | −8.64% |
Source: INSEE

== Monuments ==
- Église Sainte-Marie de Valle-d'Orezza

== See also ==
- Communes of the Haute-Corse department
