= Snow grass =

Snow grass is a common name for several plants and may refer to:

- Danthonia species in New Zealand
- Phippsia concinna
- Poa species in Australia, including:
  - Poa sieberiana
