= Plaine des Sables =

Volcanic plateau of Réunion, France

Coordinates: 21°13′48″S 55°39′36″E

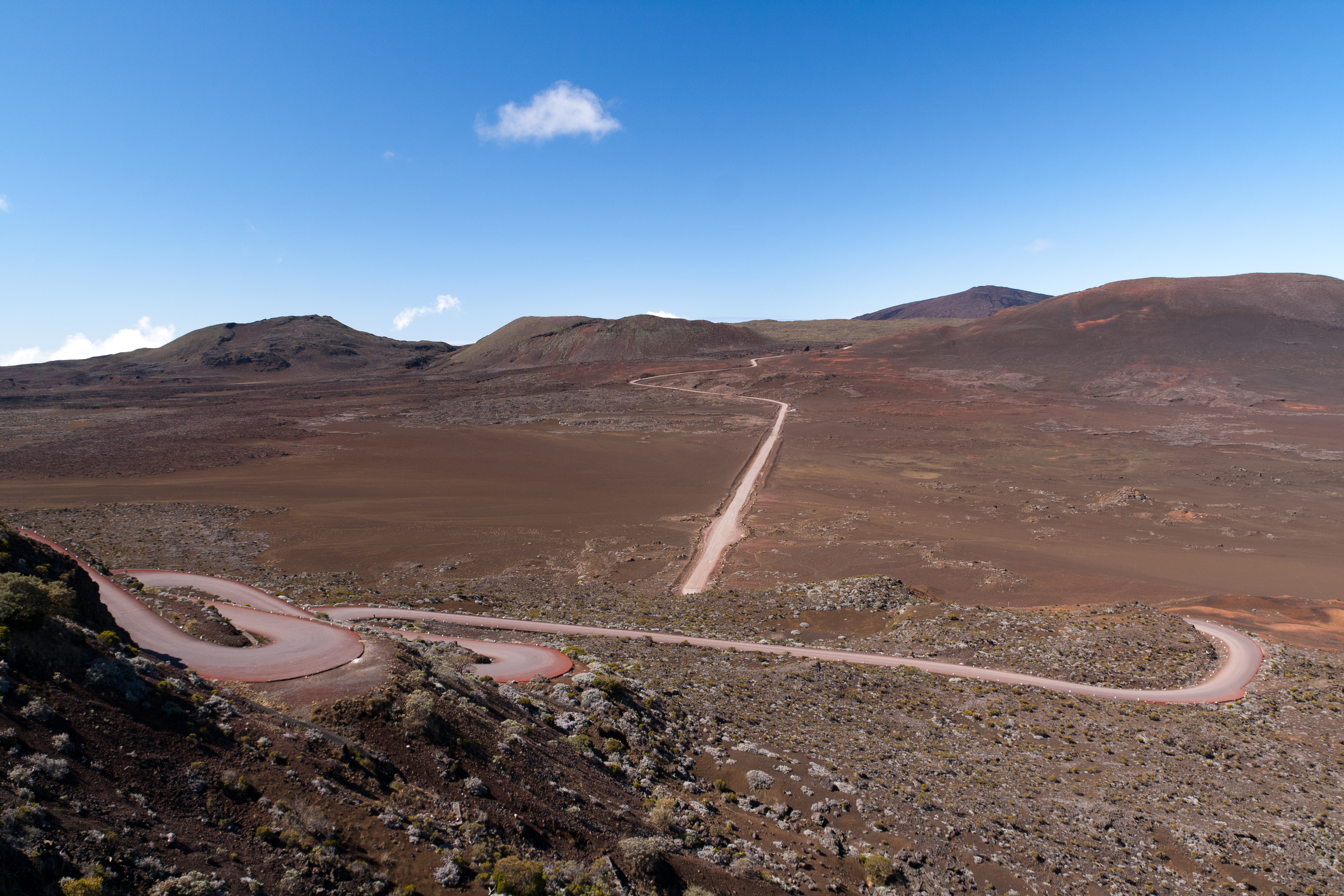
View of the Plaine des Sables from the Pas des Sables.

The Plaine des Sables (English: "Sands Plain") is a volcanic plateau in the mountains of Réunion. Part of the Piton de la Fournaise massif, this volcanic desert is situated at the border of Saint-Joseph and Sainte-Rose, within Réunion National Park.
